= Mazari caretaker government =

Government period in Pakistan

Mazari caretaker ministry
- 32nd Cabinet of Pakistan
- Incumbent
- Date formed: 19 April 1993

People and organisations
- Head of state: Ghulam Ishaq Khan
- Head of government: Balakh Sher Mazari
- Status in legislature: Caretaker government

History
- Predecessor: First Sharif I
- Successor: First Sharif II

The Mazari caretaker ministry under Balakh Sher Mazari as the caretaker prime minister of Pakistan was sworn into office after the Nawaz government was overthrown on 19 April 1993 by president Ghulam Ishaq Khan. Mazari's tenure as caretaker prime minister ended abruptly on 26 May 1993 when the Supreme Court revoked the presidential order and reinstated Nawaz Sharif as the prime minister.

== Government formation ==
On 18 April 1993, president Ghulam Ishaq Khan exercised his extra-constitutional presidential powers, instituted to him through the Eighth Amendment to the Constitution of Pakistan, to resolve the power struggle in Pakistan and dismissed the government of prime minister Nawaz Sharif. After dissolving both, the national and the provincial assemblies, Khan appointed Mazari as the caretaker prime minister. The same day, a caretaker cabinet was also sworn into the house.

This was the second time that president Khan had invoked Article 58-2b of the Eighth Amendment to bring down an elected head of government. The charges of corruption and economic mismanagement that Khan levelled against Nawaz Sharif were almost entirely identical to those he had earlier brought against Benazir Bhutto in 1990.

== Cabinet ==
=== 1993 ===
A caretaker cabinet of 22 ministers took an oath on 18 April 1993 under caretaker prime minister Balakh Sher Mazari and the president Ghulam Ishaq Khan. The Mazari caretaker cabinet was "[Pakistan's] most short-lived caretaker cabinet".

Ministry	Minister
Caretaker Prime Minister	Balakh Sher Mazari
Ministry of Housing & Works, Environment and Urban Affairs	Anwar Saifullah Khan
Ministry of Defence	Hazar Khan Bijarani
Ministry of Water and Power	Asif Ali Zardari
Ministry of Local Government and Rural Development	Sardar Fateh Mohammad Hasni
Ministry of Defence Production	Aftab Ahmad Khan Sherpao
Ministry of Petroleum and Natural Resources	Arbab Jehangir Khan
Ministry of Manpower and Overseas Pakistanis	Ghulam Murtaza Khan Jatoi
Ministry of Special Education and Special Welfare	Ahmed Bugti
Ministry of Women Development	Wazir Ahmed Khan Jogezai
Ministry of Political Affairs	Arbab Ghulam Rahim
Ministry of Parliamentary Affairs	Syed Tanveer-ul-Hassan Gillani
Ministry of Labour	Mian Zahid Sarfraz
Ministry of Management Services	Manzoor Ahmed Gichki
Ministry of Commerce	Ehsan-ul-Haq Piracha
Ministry of Food and Agriculture	Jehangir Bader
Ministry of Health	Afaq Shahid
Ministry of Industry	Zafar Ali Leghari
Ministry of Railways	Malik Mohammad Qasim
Ministry of Narcotics Control	Sardar Aseff Ahmed Ali
KANA	Amanullah Khan Jadoon
Ministry of Foreign Affairs	Sharifuddin Pirzada
Ministry of Production Welfare	Zulfiqar Ali Shah Jamote
