= Minister for Foreign Affairs (Pakistan) =

Government official in Pakistan

Minister of Foreign Affairs وزیرِ خارجہ Wazir-e-Kharija
- Emblem of Pakistan

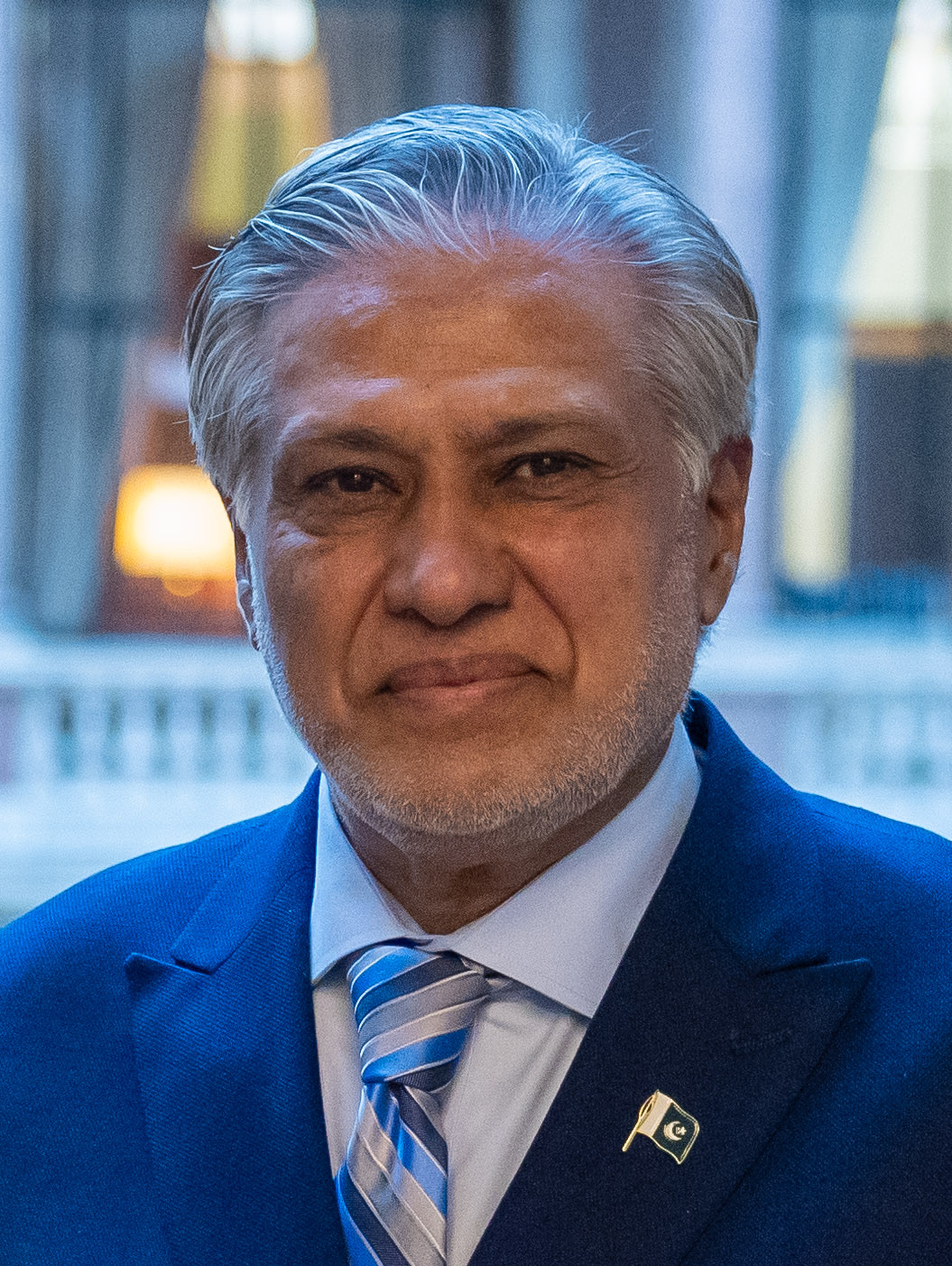
- Incumbent; Ishaq Dar since 11 March 2024
- Ministry of Foreign Affairs
- Style: Sir Minister
- Member of: Cabinet • National Security Council
- Reports to: Prime Minister of Pakistan
- Residence: Islamabad, Pakistan
- Nominator: Prime Minister of Pakistan
- Appointer: President of Pakistan
- Term length: At the Prime Minister's pleasure
- Formation: 14 Aug 1947; 79 years ago
- Deputy: Minister of State for Foreign Affairs
- Website: www.mofa.gov.pk

The Minister for Foreign Affairs (Urdu: وزیرِ خارجہ, romanized: Wazir-e-Kharija), simply the Foreign Minister, is the head of the Ministry of Foreign Affairs of the Government of Pakistan. The minister oversees the federal government's foreign policy and International relations. Their responsibility includes representing Pakistan and its government in the international community. This position is one of the senior-most offices in the Cabinet of Pakistan. The office of the foreign minister was initially held by Liaquat Ali Khan, who also served as the country's first prime minister. Subsequently, several other prime ministers have held the additional charge of the office of the foreign minister.

== List of ministers ==
The following is a list of all the previous foreign ministers of Pakistan to date, according to the Ministry of Foreign Affairs.

Legend

- Caretaker minister
- ^{†} Died in office

Portrait	Name (Born–Died)	Tenure			Party	Government	Head of Government
Portrait	Name (Born–Died)	From	To	Length	Party	Government	Head of Government
Federal Minister of Foreign Affairs							
	Liaquat Ali Khan (1947–1951); MCA for East Bengal (Prime Minister)	15 August 1947	27 December 1947	134 days	Muslim League	Liaquat	Liaquat Ali Khan
	Sir Muhammad Zafarullah Khan (1893–1985); MCA for West Punjab	27 December 1947	17 October 1951	6 years, 301 days	Muslim League	Liaquat	Liaquat Ali Khan
	Sir Muhammad Zafarullah Khan (1893–1985); MCA for West Punjab	17 October 1951	17 April 1953	6 years, 301 days	Muslim League	Nazimuddin	Sir Khawaja Nazimuddin
	Sir Muhammad Zafarullah Khan (1893–1985); MCA for West Punjab	17 April 1953	24 October 1954	6 years, 301 days	Muslim League	Bogra	Mohammad Ali Bogra
	Mohammad Ali Bogra (1909–1963); MCA for East Bengal (Prime Minister)	24 October 1954	12 August 1955	292 days	Muslim League	Bogra	Mohammad Ali Bogra
	Hamidul Huq Choudhury (1901–1992); MCA for East Bengal	28 September 1955	12 September 1956	350 days	Krishak Sramik Party	Mohammad Ali	Chaudhry Muhammad Ali
	Sir Feroz Khan Noon (1893–1970); MCA for Punjab (Prime Minister from 16 Dec 1957)	12 September 1956	7 October 1958	2 years, 25 days	Republican Party	Suhrawardy	Huseyn Shaheed Suhrawardy
	Sir Feroz Khan Noon (1893–1970); MCA for Punjab (Prime Minister from 16 Dec 1957)	12 September 1956	7 October 1958	2 years, 25 days	Republican Party	Chundrigar	I. I. Chundrigar
	Sir Feroz Khan Noon (1893–1970); MCA for Punjab (Prime Minister from 16 Dec 1957)	12 September 1956	7 October 1958	2 years, 25 days	Republican Party	Noon	Self
	Manzur Qadir (1913–1973)	29 October 1958	8 June 1962	3 years, 222 days	Muslim League	Ayub	Muhammad Ayub Khan (President)
	Mohammad Ali Bogra (1909–1963)	13 June 1962	23 January 1963^{[†]}	224 days	Muslim League	Ayub	Muhammad Ayub Khan (President)
	Zulfikar Ali Bhutto (1928–1979)	24 January 1963	30 June 1966	3 years, 157 days	Convention Muslim League	Ayub	Muhammad Ayub Khan (President)
	Sharifuddin Pirzada (1923–2017)	31 August 1966	1 May 1968	1 year, 244 days	Convention Muslim League	Ayub	Muhammad Ayub Khan (President)
	Mian Arshad Hussain (1910–1987)	1 May 1968	25 March 1969	328 days	Convention Muslim League	Ayub	Muhammad Ayub Khan (President)
	General; Yahya Khan (1917–1980) (Chief Martial Law Administrator)	25 March 1969	20 December 1971	2 years, 270 days	Pakistan Army (Non-partisan)	Yahya	Self (President)
	Zulfikar Ali Bhutto (1928–1979); MNA for 116 Larkana-I (President until 14 Aug 1973; Prime Minister from 14 Aug 1973)	20 December 1971	28 March 1977	5 years, 98 days	Pakistan People's Party	Bhutto	Zulfikar Ali Bhutto
	Aziz Ahmed (1906–1982)	30 March 1977	5 July 1977	97 days	Pakistan People's Party	Bhutto	Zulfikar Ali Bhutto
Position vacant during this interval							
	Agha Shahi (1920–2006)	14 January 1978	9 March 1982	4 years, 54 days	Independent	Haq	Muhammad Zia-ul-Haq (President)
	Lieutenant General (Retd); Sahabzada Yaqub Khan (1920–2016)	21 March 1982	1 November 1987	5 years, 225 days	Independent	Haq	Muhammad Zia-ul-Haq (President)
	Zain Noorani (1927–1992)	1 November 1987	9 June 1988	221 days	Independent	Haq	Muhammad Zia-ul-Haq (President)
	Lieutenant General (Retd); Sahabzada Yaqub Khan (1920–2016)	9 June 1988	17 August 1988	2 years, 58 days	Independent	Haq	Muhammad Zia-ul-Haq (President)
	Lieutenant General (Retd); Sahabzada Yaqub Khan (1920–2016)	17 August 1988	2 December 1988	2 years, 58 days	Independent	Ishaq Khan	Ghulam Ishaq Khan (Acting President)
	Lieutenant General (Retd); Sahabzada Yaqub Khan (1920–2016)	4 December 1988	6 August 1990	2 years, 58 days	Pakistan People's Party	Bhutto I	Benazir Bhutto
Caretaker ministry served during this interval							
	Lieutenant General (Retd); Sahabzada Yaqub Khan (1920–2016)	6 November 1990	20 March 1991	134 days	Muslim League (IJI)	Nawaz I	Nawaz Sharif
	Akram Zaki (1931–2017) (Acting)	April; 1991	10 September 1991	–	Muslim League (IJI)	Nawaz I	Nawaz Sharif
	Siddiq Khan Kanju (1951–2001) (State Minister) (Note: During this period, the Prime Minister retained the authority of the Federal Ministry of Foreign Affairs.)	10 September 1991	18 April 1993	1 year, 220 days	Muslim League (IJI)	Nawaz I	Nawaz Sharif
	Sharifuddin Pirzada (1923–2017) (Caretaker)	18 April 1993	26 May 1993	38 days	Independent (Caretaker)	Mazari	Balakh Sher Mazari (Caretaker)
	Siddiq Khan Kanju (1951–2001) (State Minister)	26 May 1993	18 July 1993	53 days	Muslim League (IJI)	Nawaz I	Nawaz Sharif
	Abdul Sattar (1931–2019) (Caretaker)	23 July 1993	19 October 1993	88 days	Independent (Caretaker)	Qureshi	Moeenuddin Ahmad Qureshi (Caretaker)
	Farooq Leghari (1940–2010)	19 October 1993	14 November 1993	26 days	Pakistan People's Party	Bhutto II	Benazir Bhutto
	Aseff Ahmad Daula (1940–2022)	16 November 1993	4 November 1996	2 years, 354 days	Pakistan People's Party	Bhutto II	Benazir Bhutto
	Lieutenant General (Retd); Sahabzada Yaqub Khan (1920–2016) (Caretaker)	11 November 1996	17 February 1997	98 days	Independent (Caretaker)	Khalid	Malik Meraj Khalid (Caretaker)
	Gohar Ayub Khan (1937–2023); MNA for 13 Abbottabad-III	25 February 1997	7 August 1998	1 year, 163 days	Pakistan Muslim League (N)	Nawaz II	Nawaz Sharif
	Sartaj Aziz (1929–2024); Senator for Islamabad Capital Territory	7 August 1998	12 October 1999	1 year, 66 days	Pakistan Muslim League (N)	Nawaz II	Nawaz Sharif
	Abdul Sattar (1931–2019)	6 November 1999	14 June 2002	2 years, 220 days	Independent	Musharraf	Pervez Musharraf (Chief Executive)
	Inam-ul-Haq (born 1940) (State Minister)	21 June 2002	23 November 2002	155 days	Independent	Musharraf	Pervez Musharraf (Chief Executive)
	Khurshid Mahmud Kasuri (born 1941); MNA for 106 Kasur-I	23 November 2002	15 November 2007	4 years, 357 days	Pakistan Muslim League (Q)	Jamali	Zafarullah Khan Jamali
	Khurshid Mahmud Kasuri (born 1941); MNA for 106 Kasur-I	23 November 2002	15 November 2007	4 years, 357 days	Pakistan Muslim League (Q)	Hussain	Shujaat Hussain
	Khurshid Mahmud Kasuri (born 1941); MNA for 106 Kasur-I	23 November 2002	15 November 2007	4 years, 357 days	Pakistan Muslim League (Q)	Aziz	Shaukat Aziz
	Inam-ul-Haq (born 1940) (Caretaker)	15 November 2007	24 March 2008	130 days	Independent (Caretaker)	Soomro	Muhammad Mian Soomro (Caretaker)
	Shah Mahmood Qureshi (born 1956); MNA for 148 Multan-I	31 March 2008	9 February 2011	2 years, 315 days	Pakistan People's Party	Gillani	Yousaf Raza Gillani
	Hina Rabbani Khar (born 1977); MNA for 177 Muzaffargarh-II	11 February 2011	19 June 2012	2 years, 33 days	Pakistan People's Party	Gillani	Yousaf Raza Gillani
	Hina Rabbani Khar (born 1977); MNA for 177 Muzaffargarh-II	22 June 2012	16 March 2013	2 years, 33 days	Pakistan People's Party	Ashraf	Raja Pervaiz Ashraf
	Mir Hazar Khan Khoso (1929–2021) (Prime Minister) (Caretaker)	4 April 2013	4 June 2013	61 days	Independent (Caretaker)	Khoso	Self (Caretaker)
Adviser to the Prime Minister on Foreign Affairs							
	Sartaj Aziz (1929–2024)	7 June 2013	28 July 2017	4 years, 51 days	Pakistan Muslim League (N)	Nawaz III	Nawaz Sharif
Federal Minister of Foreign Affairs							
	Khawaja Asif (born 1949); MNA for 71 Sialkot	4 August 2017	26 April 2018	265 days	Pakistan Muslim League (N)	Abbasi	Shahid Khaqan Abbasi
	Khurram Dastgir (born 1970); MNA for 96 Gujranwala-II	11 May 2018	31 May 2018	20 days	Pakistan Muslim League (N)	Abbasi	Shahid Khaqan Abbasi
	Abdullah Hussain Haroon (born 1950) (Caretaker)	5 June 2018	18 August 2018	74 days	Independent (Caretaker)	Mulk	Nasirul Mulk (Caretaker)
	Shah Mahmood Qureshi (born 1956); MNA for 156 Multan-III	20 August 2018	10 April 2022	3 years, 233 days	Pakistan Tehreek-e-Insaf	Imran	Imran Khan
	Bilawal Bhutto Zardari (born 1988); MNA for 200 Larkana	27 April 2022	10 August 2023	1 year, 105 days	Pakistan People's Party	Shehbaz I	Shehbaz Sharif
	Jalil Abbas Jilani (born 1955) (Caretaker)	17 August 2023	4 March 2024	200 days	Independent (Caretaker)	Kakar	Anwaar ul Haq Kakar (Caretaker)
	Ishaq Dar (born 1950); Senator for Punjab (Deputy Prime Minister)	11 March 2024	Incumbent	2 years, 240 days	Pakistan Muslim League (N)	Shehbaz II	Shehbaz Sharif

== See also ==
- Constitution of Pakistan
- President of Pakistan
- Prime Minister of Pakistan
- Finance Minister of Pakistan
- Interior Minister of Pakistan
- Defense Minister of Pakistan
