= Agha Hilaly =

Pakistani diplomat (1911–2001)

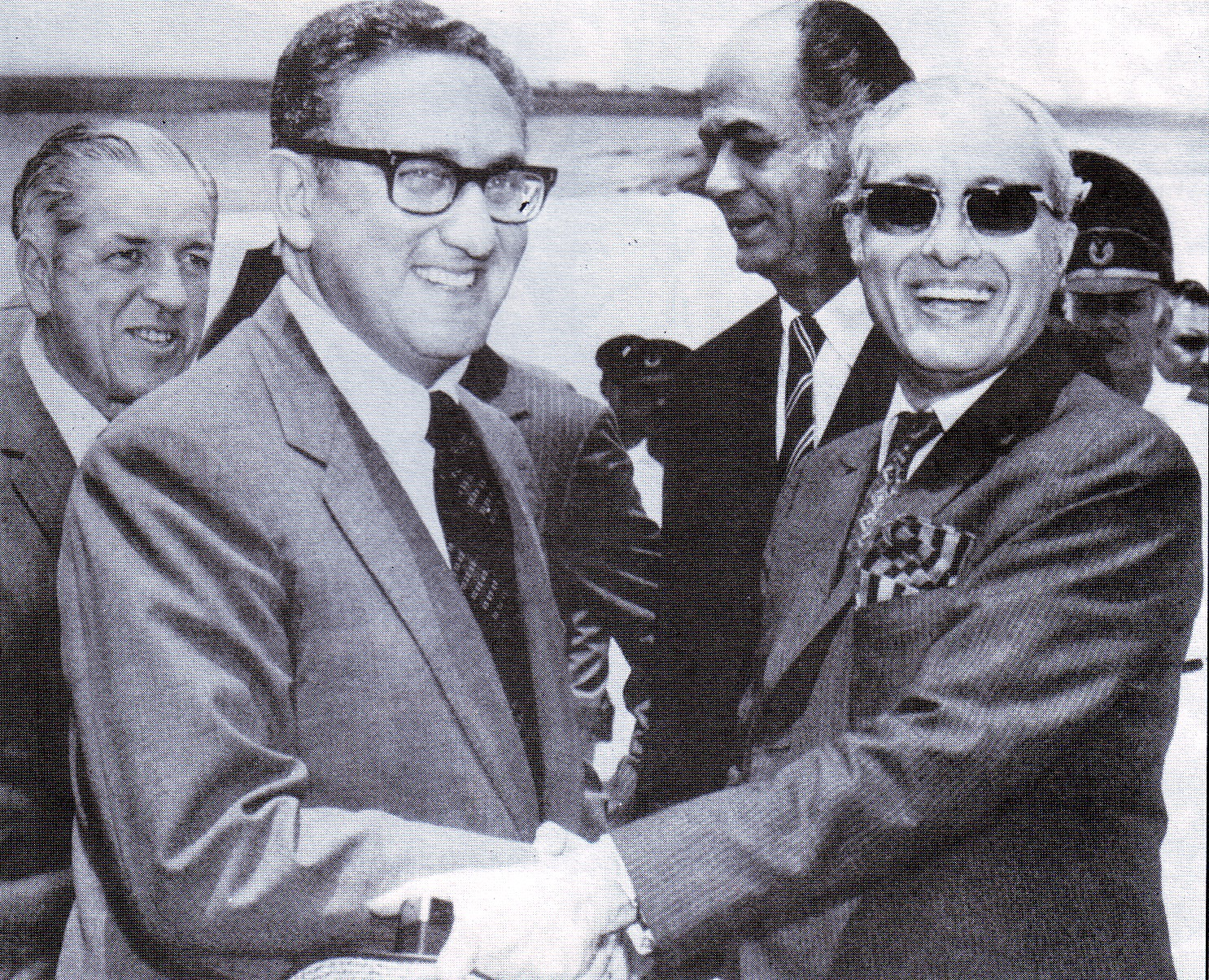
- Ambassador Hilaly receiving US Secretary of State Henry Kissinger in Rawalpindi on 8 July 1971 secretly en route to China
- Born: 20 May 1911; Bangalore, Princely State of Mysore, British India
- Died: 6 February 2001 (aged 89); Karachi, Pakistan
- Spouse: Malik Taj Mirza née Tyabji
- Children: 3, including Zafar Hilaly
- Relatives: Agha Shahi (brother); Shamim Hilaly (daughter-in-law)
- Family: Tyabji family (through wife)

Agha Hilaly (20 May 1911 – 6 February 2001) (Urdu: آغا هلالی) was one of Pakistan's senior most diplomats who held several high offices in the Government of Pakistan, including Pakistan's Ambassador to the United States from 21 October 1966 to 20 October 1971.

== Career and family background ==
Hilaly was born in 1911 in Bangalore. He joined the Indian Civil Service in 1936 at the age of 25, and opted for Pakistan during the independence of Pakistan in 1947 and settled in Pakistan along with his family in 1947. As the Government of Pakistan was in the process of establishing its foreign service cadre, all officers of the Civil Service of Pakistan that succeeded the Indian Civil Service were encouraged to join the new cadre. Hilaly was one of the first to do so and played an important role in shaping the strategic dimensions of Pakistan's foreign policy.

He was Pakistani Ambassador to the Scandinavian countries with residence in Stockholm from 1956 to 1959. In 1959 he was appointed Ambassador to Moscow and concurrently to Prague, until 1961, when he was assigned to India.

Hilay, while representing Pakistan at the United Nations and serving as Ambassador to the United States, played an important role in the US rapprochement with China, as he did in 1969 when he met with highest representatives of the US State Department, like Secretary Kissinger. This way he facilitated the secret visit of Henry Kissinger to China, a fact acknowledged by President Richard Nixon and a symbol of a bold reversal of US policy towards an avowed enemy state.

His younger brother Agha Shahi also an ICS officer followed in his footsteps and rose to be Foreign Minister of Pakistan. One of their uncles Sir Mirza Ismail served as Diwan Prime Minister of the princely state of Mysore, Jaipur and Hyderabad, India from 1926 to 1947. His nephew Akbar Mirza Khaleeli was a prominent Indian Diplomat and served as Indian Ambassador to Iran, Italy and Australia and was Advisor to the Indian Government on Middle Eastern Affairs. His son Zafar Hilaly is also a former ambassador of Pakistan.

== Death ==
Agha Hilaly died in Karachi on 6 February 2001, at the age of 89.

Diplomatic posts
Preceded by S. M. Burke	Pakistan Ambassador to Stockholm; 1956 to 1959	Succeeded by Khwaj i Mohammad Kaiser
Preceded by Sikander Ali Baig	Pakistan Ambassador to Moscow; 1959 to 1961	Succeeded by Mian Arshad Hussain
Preceded by Allah Bukhsh Karim Bukhsh Brohi	Pakistan High Commissioner to New-Delhi; 1961 to 1963	Succeeded by Mian Arshad Hussain
Preceded by Mohammad Yusuf (prime minister)	Pakistan High Commissioner to London; 1965	Succeeded by Samiullah Khan Dehlavi
Preceded by Ghulam Ahmed	Pakistan Ambassador to the United States; 1966–1971	Succeeded by Nawabzada Agha Mohammad Raza
