= Cabinet Committee on National Security (Pakistan) =

Federal institution and consultative forum

The Cabinet Committee on National Security (CCNS or C^{2}NS), (Urdu: کابینہ کمیٹی قومی سلامتی) previously known as the Defence Committee of Cabinet, is the principal federal institution and consultative forum used by the people-elected Prime Minister of Pakistan for concerning matters of state's national security, geopolitical, geostrategic, and foreign policy matters with the Prime minister's chief military advisers, senior government advisers and senior Cabinet ministers.

Since its creation and inception under Prime minister Zulfikar Ali Bhutto in 1976, the primary functions under the CCNS's domain is to advise and assist the Prime minister on issues involving the national security, threat of war, nuclear weapons politics, and challenges in geo-strategic and foreign policies. The CCNS serves as the prime minister's principal decision-making and consultative forum for co-ordinating national security and geo-strategic foreign policies among various government institutions and ministries. The CCNS is a counterpart of the national security councils of many other nations.

== History ==
=== Inception and creation:1976–1991 ===
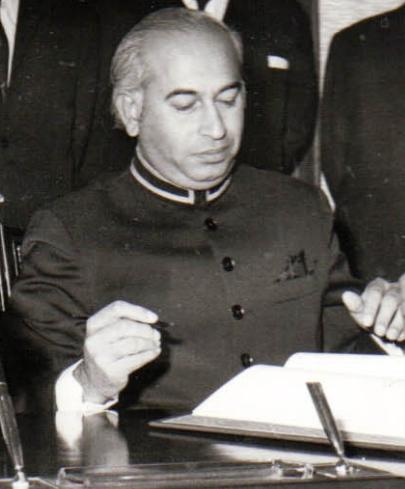
Prime Minister Zulfikar Ali Bhutto established the DCC in 1976, to replace the controversial NSC in 1976.

In 1969, the concept of National Security Council was established by President Yahya Khan, but it was dominated by the military science circles of Pakistan, and it had controversial standing in the political science circles of Pakistan. The NSC under Yahya Khan was marked with controversial image in the Pakistan's civil society and it was repeatedly blamed for its constant interference in state's internal policies and political involvement. The NSC secretariat did not figure in the decision-making of the military government because President Yahya Khan ran his government administration as personalised enterprise relaying heavily on his close and trusted military and bureaucratic advisers. The NSC Secretariat under Yahya Khan was only a paper organisation.

As an aftermath of disastrous conflict with India which led the succession of East-Pakistan, the Hamoodur Rahman Commission led by Chief Justice Hamoodur Rahman pointed the brutal failure and breakdown of civil-military relations between the Pakistan Military in East Pakistan and political science sphere of Pakistan. Proponents of the reform realised that "no institutional means for the coordination of foreign and defense policy existed", and that the informal management techniques employed by President Yahya Khan and Prime minister Nurul Aminduring the during 1971 Winter war were not suitable for the long haul. Ever since, the calls were made by country's influential sphere to create the national security council. The origins of the Cabinet Committee on National Security date back to Prime Minister of Pakistan, Zulfikar Ali Bhutto in May 1976, after the state parliament strongly rejected the Pakistan military's proposal of establishing the national security council.

Ultimately, Prime minister Bhutto published the White paper on Higher Defence Organisations (HDO) which outlined the institutional arrangements for dealing with defence and national security affairs. With establishing the Joint Chiefs of Staff Committee led by its chairman, the DCC was established with the ultimate mandate and responsibility rested with the civilian Prime Minister and contained other government institutions involved in the decision-making on security and national security affairs. The CCNS repeatedly advise Prime minister Bhutto on various occasions on issues involving the geostrategic affairs, national security assessments, and internal political situation in the country. In 1976, the DCC held its first meeting chaired by Prime minister Zulfikar Bhutto with his senior military officials and strategists where he hold talks of possible war with Afghanistan, due to persistent aggressive acts by Afghanistan. Bhutto and Daud made an exchange of official visit to force Afghanistan to accept the Durand Line as the permanent border. It was the first time that the DCC approved its first policy on foreign affairs and Western experts viewed Bhutto's policy as "astute policy" in regards to the border question clearly increased pressure of the Afghanistan and very likely helped stimulate Afghan governments move towards accommodation. In 1985, the DCC was controversially replaced by the newly formed but highly controversial National Security Council (NSC) and continued its functions until 1993 when the NSC was dissolved by Prime minister Benazir Bhutto in 1993.

=== DCC reorganisations and expansion: 1991–1999 ===
In 1994, the DCC was again operationalised and had conducted fewer meetings between the Prime minister and prime minister's chief military advisers. In January 1997, President Farooq Leghari and Prime Minister Meraj Khalid reorganised the DCC council and established its operational parameter, more into public policy and nuclear weapons politics matters. The new people-elected Prime minister Nawaz Sharif approved the new DCC policy and integrated the DCC with Economic Coordination Committee (ECC). Its parametric responsibilities included to provide comprehensive advice to federal cabinet on formulation of defence policy, its co-ordination with external and domestic policies and other matters with implications for security and stability.

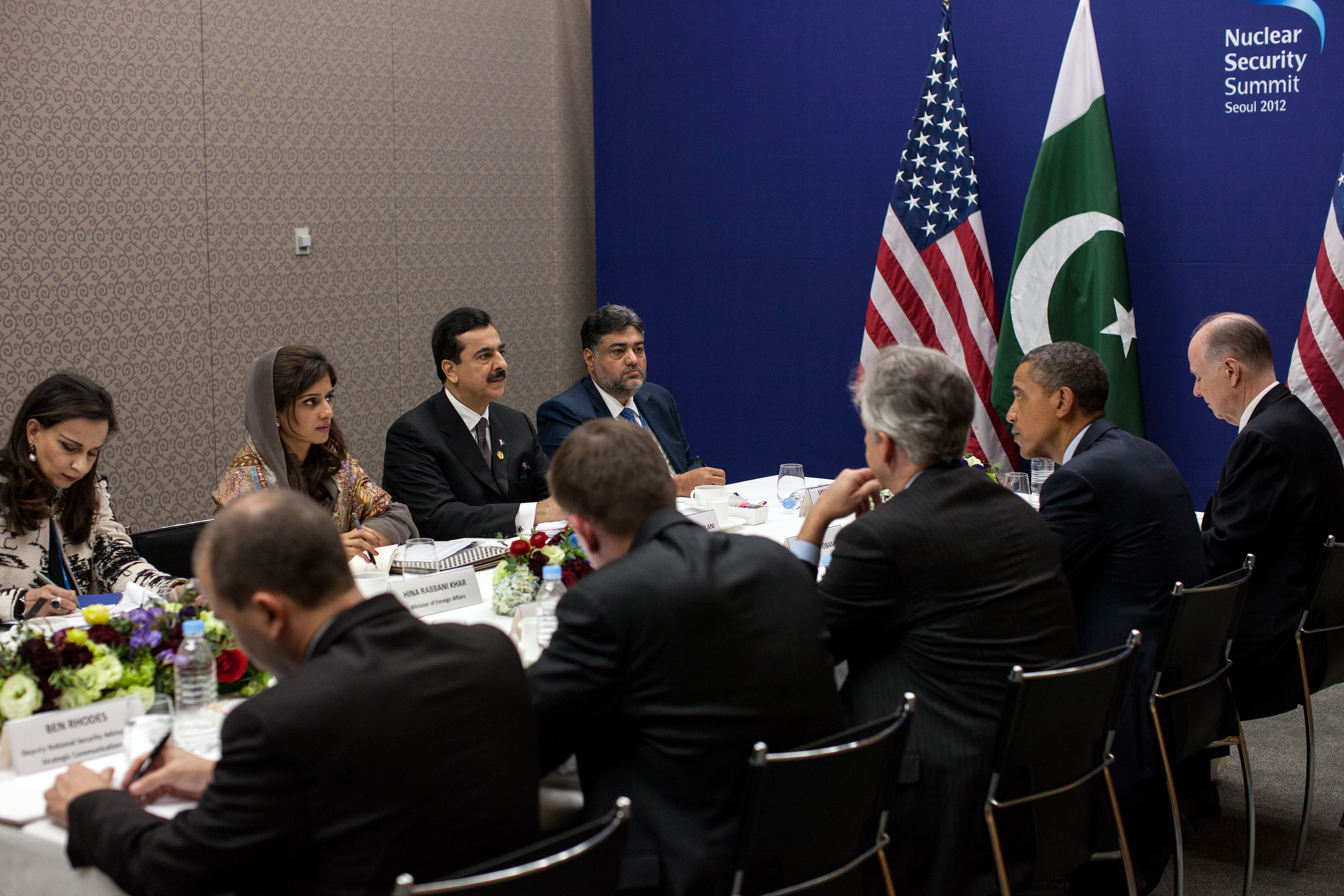
The DCC staffers chaired by Prime minister Yousaf Gillani meeting with President Barack Obama.

Since India's second nuclear tests, Pokhran-II in 1998, the nuclear weapons politics, nuclear restraints, and nuclear weapons exercise, has been integrated in the operational mandate of DCC council. The DCC council provided a meaningful and mutual environment of understanding of national security issues between the Pakistan Armed Forces and the civilian institutions. In May 1998, the repeated and emergency meetings of DCC provided a great environment of its performance when Prime minister Nawaz Sharif ordered Pakistan's first public nuclear tests, Chagai-I which was followed by Chagai-II, after the DCC council conveyed various civil-military sessions with the Prime minister and the military leadership.

Decision-making in matters of defence is to be a coordinated effort by the DCC council between the civil and the military elements in Pakistan. The DCC provides comprehensive consultative and unified point of view of military and people-elected civilian sphere in the decision making in Pakistan on issues involving the foreign policy, military policies in the war on terror, nuclear weapons development and operational development. Through the DCC council, the military has a permanent and influential seat at the cabinet-level meetings and Chairman of the Joint Chiefs of Staff Committee served DCC Council's principal and chief military adviser to advise the civilian prime minister on military spectrum and provide the military point of view on the important national issues.

=== Developments and meetings:2008 – present ===
The CCNS is not restricted to the key cabinet ministers, and any cabinet ministers can also attend the meeting. The CCNS reaffirms the permanent seat for the military leaders of joint forces at the Cabinet-level meeting. According to the reports of Pakistan Institute of Legislative Development and Transparency (PILDT) published in March 2012 shows that DCC meetings were held nine times from April 2008 until March 2008. These civic-military meetings were reactive in nature and were held in response to an emergency issue or crises. The CCNS (known as the DCC before August 2013) replaced the controversial National Security Council (NSC) and its first meeting took place on 8 December 2008, under the chairmanship of Prime Minister Yousaf Raza Gillani, to discuss the security situation and to authorise nuclear force option to deter Indian pressure after the Mumbai attacks in 2008. Since then, the CCNS has acquired more salience than it was ever in the past decades.

Since 2008, the role of Defence Cabinet Committee, Parliament and its committees has increased. The military science circles is more forthcoming in giving briefings on national security issues to the Parliament and high-ranking civilians than it was in General Musharraf's period.

=== Parliament access and committees ===
- Standing Committee on Defence and Defence Production
- Parliamentary Standing Committee on National Security
- Standing Committee on Defence
- Public Accounts Committee

== Structure ==
Pakistan State emblem.

Principal structure of the Cabinet Committee on National Security
Official Designation	Government Secretariat and Offices
Chairman	Prime Minister of Pakistan
Principal Military Adviser	Chairman of Joint Chiefs of Staff Committee
Intelligence Adviser(s)	DG Inter-Services Intelligence
Intelligence Adviser(s)	National Intelligence Coordination Committee
Science Advisor	Science Adviser to the Government
Cabinet Ministers	National Security Adviser
Cabinet Ministers	Interior Minister
Cabinet Ministers	Finance Minister
Cabinet Ministers	Foreign Affairs Adviser
Military leadership	Chief of Army Staff of Pakistan Army
Military leadership	Chief of Naval Staff of Pakistan Navy
Military leadership	Chief of Air Staff of Pakistan Air Force
