= Chatti (surname) =

Chatti (Arabic pronunciation: [ˈالشطي]) is a surname found in Tunisia and Kuwait.

== Chatti of Tunisia ==
Chatti (or Chatty) of Tunisia is found mainly in Msaken.

== Branches ==
- Baya Chatti
- Zommitt Chatti
- Gregueb Chatti
- Baccouch Chatti
- Layouni Chatti
- Chargui or Chergui

== People ==
- Habib Chatti
- Zoubeir Baya

== DNA Haplogroup ==
- One sample from Chatti family in Msaken was found by Family Tree DNA as belonging to Y Chromosome DNA Haplogroup J-L271, a branch of Haplogroup J-M172, the same haplogroup was also found among most of Msaken samples belonging to different surnames.
