= Minister of State for Foreign Affairs =

Minister of State for Foreign Affairs may refer to:

- Minister of State for External Affairs (India)
- Minister of State for Foreign Affairs (Pakistan)
