= Aziz Ahmed (civil servant) =

Pakistani statesman and diplomat

Aziz Ahmed OBE, HPk
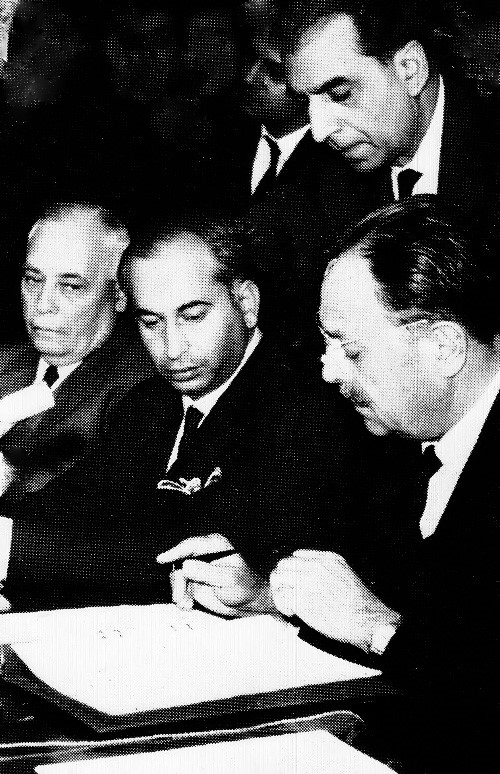
- Aziz Ahmed (back, leaning over) watches Ayub Khan signing the Tashkent Agreement on 10 January 1966.

13th Minister of Foreign Affairs
- In office 30 March 1977 – 5 July 1977
- President: Fazal Ilahi Chaudhry
- Prime Minister: Zulfikar Ali Bhutto
- Preceded by: Zulfikar Ali Bhutto
- Succeeded by: Agha Shahi

1st Minister of State for Foreign Affairs
- In office 7 February 1973 – 28 March 1977
- President: Fazal Illahi Chaudhry
- Prime Minister: Zulfikar Ali Bhutto
- Preceded by: Office created
- Succeeded by: Zain Noorani

8th Foreign Secretary of Pakistan
- In office 26 July 1963 – 23 June 1966
- President: Field Marshal Ayub Khan
- Preceded by: Samiulla Khan Dehlavi
- Succeeded by: Air Marshal S. M. Yusuf

5th Pakistani Ambassador to the United States
- In office 23 March 1959 – 26 July 1963
- President: Field Marshal Ayub Khan
- Preceded by: Muhammad Ali Bogra
- Succeeded by: Ghulam Ahmed

Personal details
- Born: Aziz Ahmed; 24 June 1906 Amritsar, Punjab Province (British India)
- Died: 23 October 1982 (aged 76) Islamabad, Pakistan
- Resting place: Islamabad Capital Cemetery
- Citizenship: British Subject (1906–1947); Pakistan (1947–1982)
- Children: 4
- Education: Government College, Lahore; University of Cambridge
- Cabinet: Zulfikar Ali Bhutto Government

Aziz Ahmed, OBE, HPk (Urdu: عزیز احمد; 24 June 1906 – 23 October 1982) was a career Pakistani statesman and a diplomat during the Cold War, serving in the capacity as 13th Foreign Minister of Pakistan from 1973 until 1977. Prior to that, Ahmad served as the Pakistan Ambassador to the United States (1959–63) and eventually appointed Foreign secretary (1960–67) by President Ayub Khan.

He initially gained national prominence when he served as the Foreign secretary under then-Foreign Minister Zulfikar Ali Bhutto and opted for retirement in the opposition of Tashkent Agreement, signed by Ayub Khan to maintain and hold ceasefire with India in 1965. After the general elections in 1970 and the subsequent war with India in 1971, Ahmad was appointed the Foreign minister of Pakistan until being terminated by President Muhammad Zia-ul-Haq after issuing criticism against the military coup d'état in 1977. Upon retirement from the Foreign Service, Ahmed lived a quiet life in Islamabad and died in 1982.

According to historian Prabhas Chandra Lahiri, Aziz Ahmed was responsible for planning the Anderson Bridge massacre.

== Early life and education ==
Aziz Ahmed was born in a Sheikh Qureshi family of Tarn Taran district of Amritsar, British India on 24 June 1906. Ahmed received his basic education at Amritsar and moved to Lahore for his further studies and permanently settled there. There, he attended the Government College in 1924, and graduated with a BSc in political science in 1928. He then proceeded to the United Kingdom for higher studies, where with a scholarship offered and awarded by the British government, Ahmed subsequently studied at the University of Cambridge in 1929. In 1933, Aziz gained MSc in political science, followed by another MSc in foreign policy. Upon his return Ahmed passed the civil service exam and was commissioned into Indian Civil Service.

== Career as civil servant ==
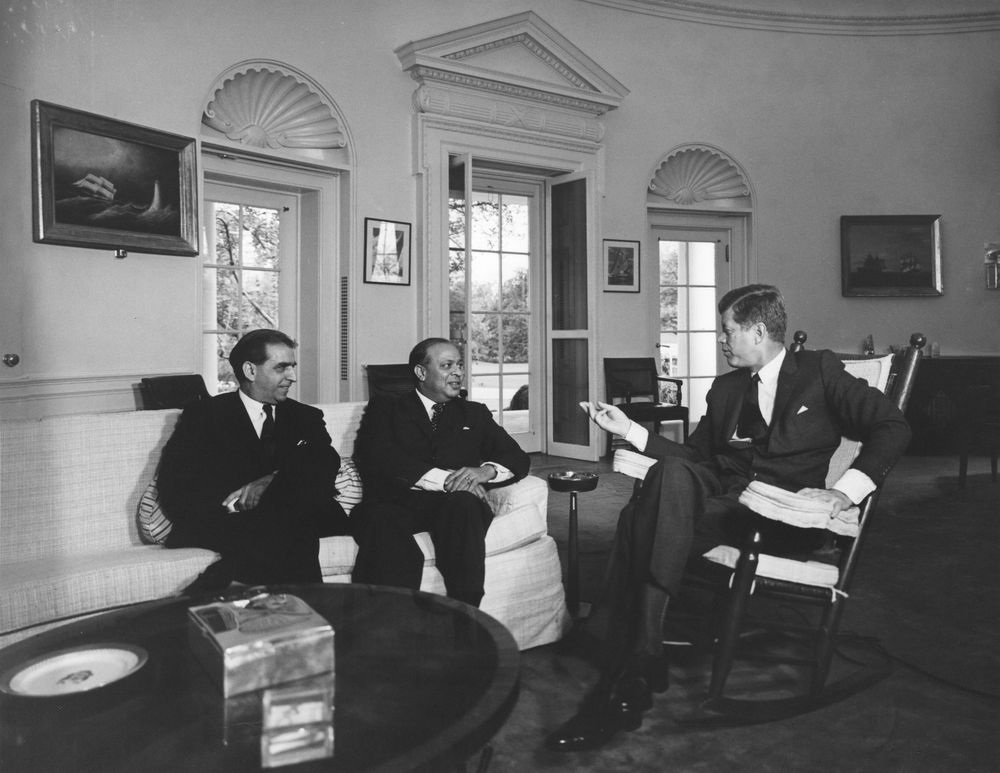
President John F. Kennedy (in rocking chair) meets with Minister of External Affairs of Pakistan, Mohammad Ali Bogra. Ambassador of Pakistan, Aziz Ahmed, sits at far left. Oval Office, White House, Washington, D.C., in 1962.

Aziz Ahmed was a senior member of the Indian Civil Service (ICS) and later Civil Service of Pakistan (CSP). In 1948, Ahmed served in East Bengal prior to independence in 1947 and was instrumental in getting the Debt Alleviation Act of 1938 passed into legislation. Aziz Ahmed subsequently held several senior positions in successive administrations in newly independent Pakistan. He was appointed as the first Chief Secretary of East-Pakistan at a time when General Muhammad Ayub Khan was the General Officer Commanding for East Pakistan. The two developed a close friendship and when Ayub Khan declared martial law and assumed full powers in 1958, Aziz Ahmed was made the highest ranking civil servant in his government as Secretary General, Cabinet Division and Deputy Martial Law Administrator. Aziz Ahmed's tenure as Chief Secretary was marred by allegations of discrimination against the local population, his heavy handed demeanor and colonial style management style. Many have attributed Aziz Ahmed's attitude to the beginning of the long list of grievances that former East Pakistan populace had against the Pakistani establishment.

Subsequently, he was sent as Pakistan's Ambassador to the United States in 1959 and was instrumental in developing the strong ties between the two countries, that characterised both the Eisenhower and the Kennedy administrations of the early sixties. He returned in 1963 to take up the post of Foreign Secretary at a time when Zulfikar Ali Bhutto was the Foreign Minister. He gained further prominence at the national level in Pakistan, following the 1965 war with India. He was opposed to the signing of the Tashkent Declaration by Ayub Khan as was Bhutto. He retired from government service in 1966 and was assigned to head the National Press Trust.

== Indo-Pakistan war of 1965 ==
Ahmed initially gained public prominence with Zulfikar Ali Bhutto in 1965. On 4 September 1965, following skirmishes, Ahmed received a warning from the Pakistan Embassy to Turkey, that the Indian Army was preparing and planning an attack on West Pakistan. The Pakistani Government decided to launch a counter-attack.

Aziz and Bhutto played an important role in drafting Operation Gibraltar, and along with Bhutto, Aziz Ahmed pressed the Government to take advantage of the disturbed situation in the valley and direct the Army to send raiders into Indian held Kashmir for conducting guerrilla activities. Operation Gibraltar was designed to help local Kashmiris to organise a movement of agitation, the objective being to eventually start an uprising against the occupying power. Throughout this war, Ahmed assisted Bhutto on numerous occasions thereby gaining Bhutto's confidence. From there onwards Bhutto and Aziz Ahmed became good friends. During this war, Morrice James, a senior British diplomat and British High Commissioner to Pakistan from 1962 to 1965, convinced Ayub Khan to accept the cease-fire appeal from India, on the basis that Pakistan may not be able fight without weapons or sustain a long war. At the UNSC, Aziz joined Bhutto, when the latter famously announced that, "Pakistan will fight, fight for a thousand years", in reference to the war of 1971".

Aziz and Bhutto disagreed with Ayub Khan's decision to enter into a cease-fire with India in 1965, though the pair did assist Ayub in signing the Tashkent Agreement with India under the auspices of Soviet Union. Soon after this agreement, Aziz Ahmed took the retirement from the Foreign Service and expressed a strong opposition against the government of Ayub Khan.

== Foreign minister ==
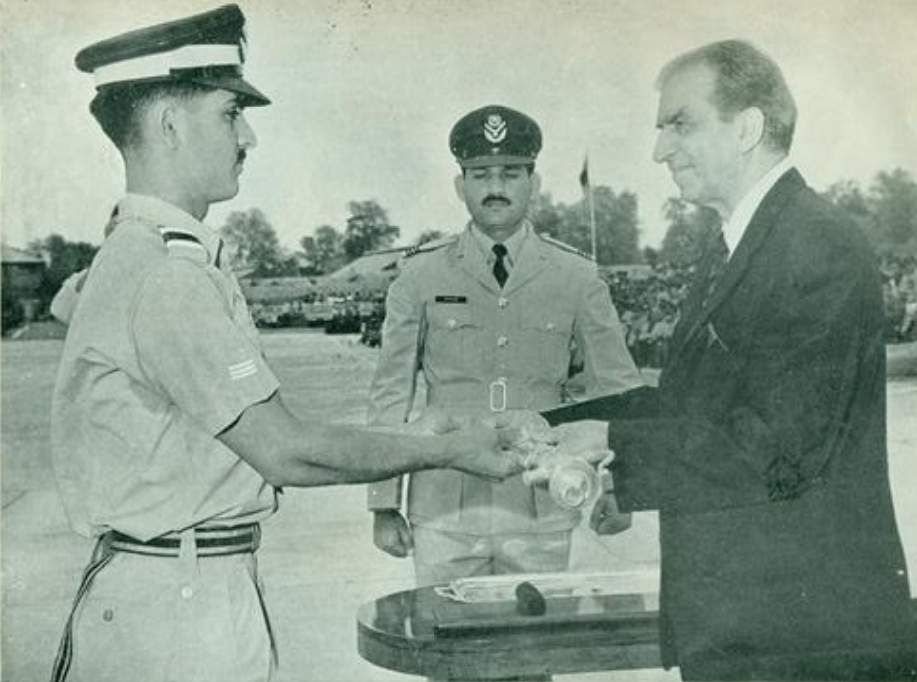
Flt Cadet Abdul Razzaq Anjum receives the Sword of Honour from Aziz Ahmed as the top graduate of his course, PAF Academy, 1973.

Soon after the East Pakistan disaster, followed by the 1971 Winter war, Bhutto was hastily made President on 20 December 1971. After he was appointed President, Zulfikar Ali Bhutto summoned Aziz Ahmed out of retirement and appointed him Minister of State for Foreign Affairs. Subsequently, Aziz Ahmed was regarded as one of Bhutto's closest confidantes and appointed Minister of State for Defence and Foreign Affairs and finally as Foreign Minister for a few months, before the government was toppled in the military coup of 1977. Aziz Ahmed assisted in negotiating the Simla Agreement between Pakistan and India in 1972 and in organising the Islamic Summit at Lahore in 1974, where he headed Pakistan's delegation. As Minister of Defence, he played a key role in re-building Pakistan's defence capability after the 1971 war with India, as well as, the development of the Country's nuclear programme. Aziz convinced Richard Nixon to ensure the supply of weapons to Pakistan to counter Indian hegemony and weapons build-up. When pressed on the repatriation of Stranded Pakistanis, Aziz Ahmed told the Bangladesh foreign minister Kamal Hossain to send them to India. When the Bangladeshis told him that pushing the Biharis into India was not feasible, Ahmed said "then push them into the Bay of Bengal".

Aziz Ahmed continued to work with Bhutto in building ties with China, and the Arab world. He also helped Bhutto to negotiate with the Soviet Union for economical assistance. His term as Foreign Minister was cut short in 1977.

Aziz Ahmed remained a staunch opponent of martial law and the military government of General Zia-ul-Haq.

== Death and legacy ==
Aziz Ahmed died on 23 October 1982, aged 76 and was buried in Islamabad. He was a recipient of Pakistan's highest civil award, HPk. He was survived by his wife Shereen Ahmed, two sons and two daughters.

== See also ==
- Muhammad Ayub Khan
- Zulfikar Ali Bhutto
- Pakistani Ambassador to the United States

Diplomatic posts
| Preceded by Muhammad Ali Bogra | Pakistan Ambassador to the United States; 1959–1963 | Succeeded by Ghulam Ahmed |
Political offices
| Preceded by S.K. Dehlavi | Foreign Secretary of Pakistan; 1963–1966 | Succeeded by S.M. Yusuf |
| Preceded by none | Minister of State for Foreign Affairs; 1973–1977 | Succeeded by Zain Noorani |
| Preceded by Zulfikar Ali Bhutto | Foreign Minister of Pakistan; 1977 | Succeeded by Agha Shahi |
