= Abdul Sattar (diplomat) =

Pakistani diplomat

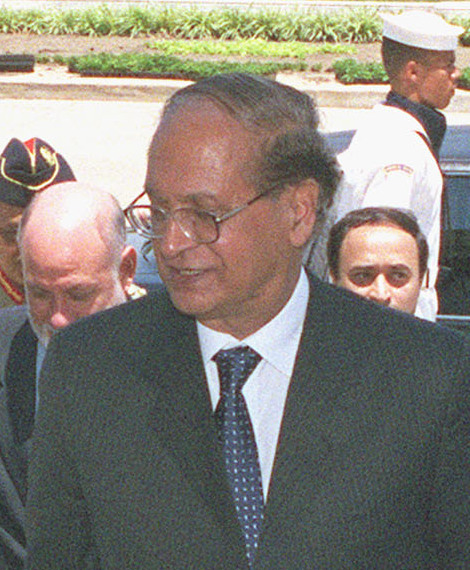
- Abdul Sattar

Minister of Foreign Affairs
- In office 6 November 1999 – 14 June 2002
- President: Pervez Musharraf
- Preceded by: Sartaj Aziz
- Succeeded by: Khurshid Kasuri
- In office 23 July 1993 – 19 October 1993
- President: Ghulam Ishaq Khan
- Preceded by: General Yakub Khan
- Succeeded by: Aseff Ali

17th Foreign Secretary of Pakistan
- In office 31 May 1986 – 2 August 1988
- Preceded by: Niaz A. Naik
- Succeeded by: Humayun Khan

Personal details
- Born: Abdul Sattar; 1931
- Died: 23 June 2019 (aged 88) Islamabad, Islamabad Capital Territory, Pakistan
- Resting place: Islamabad
- Citizenship: Pakistan

Abdul Sattar (1931 – 23 June 2019) (/ˈɑːbdʊl səˈtɑːr/ AHB-duul sə-TAHR; Urdu: عبد الستار), was a Pakistani political scientist, career foreign service officer, diplomat, author of foreign policy, and nuclear strategist.

Prior to being appointed Foreign minister of Pakistan in two non–consecutive terms, Sattar served in the Foreign ministry, first serving as ambassador to the Soviet Union and Permanent Representative of Pakistan to International Atomic Energy Agency (IAEA).

He authored several books on Foreign policy, and won critical praise of his diplomatic skills and work. In a review of Sattar's book Pakistan's Foreign Policy, Amitabh Mattoo of India Today considered Sattar to be "one of the shrewdest foreign policy practitioners that Islamabad has ever produced".

== Biography ==
=== Foreign service career ===
Abdul Sattar started his career in foreign service in the mid-1950s, first working closely with Agha Shahi, on foreign service issues. He was one of the foreign service diplomats assisting the implementation of the Simla Agreement in 1972. In 1975, he was named ambassador to Austria. In 1978, he was posted in India. He was the High Commissioner to India until 1982; he was again appointed high commissioner to India in 1990, until his return to Pakistan in 1992. From 1986 to 1988, he served as the Foreign Secretary. In 1988, he was appointed ambassador to the USSR, where he continued until 1990, when he was appointed Permanent Representative to the IAEA in Vienna.

He held among the important posts in the foreign office, including serving as the director of Soviet Union and Eastern Bloc from 1982 to 1986, and director general of Southeast Asia affairs from 1987 to 1988.

=== Nuclear strategy and overview ===
While working on different foreign service assignments with Agha Shahi in the 1970s, Sattar became close and had cordial relations with theorist, Munir Ahmad Khan. On multiple occasions, he had discussions with Munir Khan on topics involving physics and nuclear strategic issues. In the 1980s, he helped resolve possible nuclear restraint issue with India, after directing message to Munir Khan to hold meeting with Raja Ramanna in Vienna. He would later serve in identifying the nuclear policy stand of Pakistan as his role as Permanent Representative of Pakistan to International Atomic Energy Agency (IAEA). He was the primary drafter of the strategic doctrine on atomic weapons and efficaciously argued for it. In the 1980s, his direct involvement and assisting the government on shaping the nuclear policy resulting in declaring the official adoption of nuclear ambiguity on Pakistan's nuclear deterrence program.

About the nuclear weapons quantity, Sattar notably quoted to media that the "minimum cannot be defined in static numbers" and the "size of Pakistan's arsenals and deployment patterns have to be adjusted to ward off dangers of the preemptive and inception."

In 1995, Sattar maintained that India and Pakistan's "attainment of nuclear weapons had promoted stability and prevented dangers of war despite the crises that has risen time and time...". In 1999, he provided his expertise to Government of Pakistan for negotiating the terms of Comprehensive Nuclear-Test-Ban Treaty (CTBT) and Nuclear Non-Proliferation Treaty (NPT), initially defusing the pressure on Pakistan in 1999.

=== Foreign minister ===
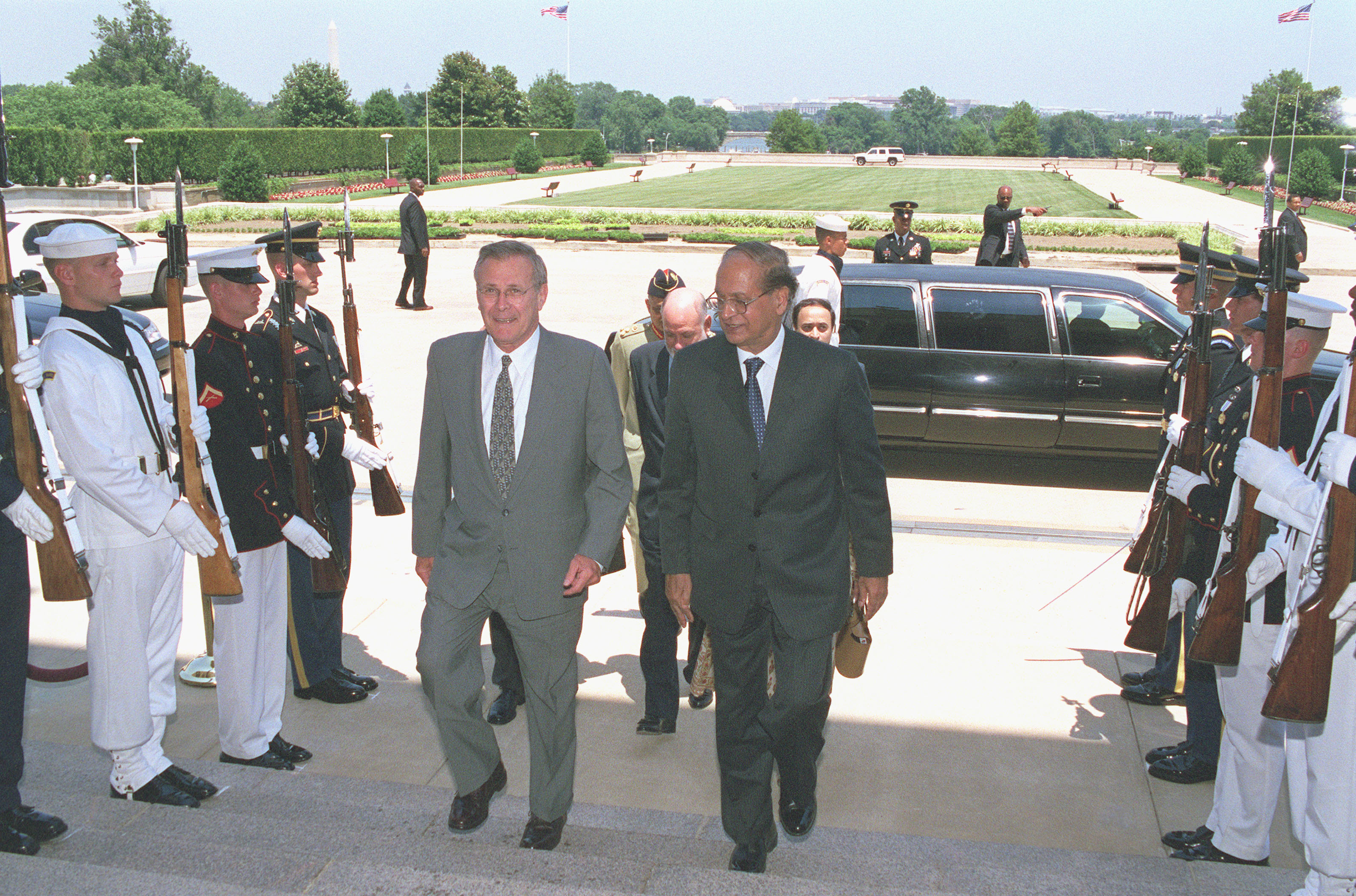
Sattar arriving to meet US Defense Secretary Donald Rumsfeld, 2001.

On 6 November 1999, Abdul Sattar was named one of leading ministers in Musharraf's newly sworn in military government, and appointed Foreign Minister. He was one of the earliest members in (now defunct establishment) National Security Council (NSC), a personal directive issued by Pervez Musharraf in 1999. Not surprisingly, President Pervez Musharraf had selected Sattar along with Shaukat Aziz as earliest members of his military government. In India, especially within sections of the foreign policy orthodoxy, some believed Sattar to be an anti-India thinker. While serving in government he was a known advocate of peaceful negotiations.

In 2001, Sattar coordinated an emergency meeting with US National Security Adviser, Condoleezza Rice, which many of his attendees described as a "rough meeting." Sattar worked on normalizing relations with the United States even as before 9/11 attacks in the United States in 2001. After the US demands to Pakistan to provide utmost co-operation on War on terror, Sattar later described the co-operation policy as: "We agreed that we would unequivocally accept all US demands, but then we would express our private reservations to the US, and we would not necessarily agree with all the details."

Abdul Sattar assisted Musharraf after negotiating Agra summit to be held in India in 2001. He drafted the work on the Agra summit, but ultimately the talks failed and no conclusion on Agra summit was reached.

=== Resignation ===
In June 2002, Sattar resigned from his ministerial post, citing health reasons. His resignation letter was immediately approved by President Pervez Musharraf, as Sattar requested to "relieve him at the earliest." His close correspondents reportedly issued statements to media that the "last few months Sattar was not feeling comfortable in his office as the self-appointed President had virtually rendered the whole Foreign Office redundant." The military government was not consulting the Foreign Office on any issue including the hectic diplomatic activity in the recent weeks over the standoff with India on Kashmir issue. An article in the media noted: "When the mood of the dictator formulates the foreign policy of the country, then what is the need to have a foreign minister?"

On the other hand, the India Today wrote in 2007 that "Musharraf finally realised that Sattar was not the ideal candidate to further peace with India, and immediately replaced him in 2002, with Khurshid Mahmud Kasuri."

== Academia and professorship ==
=== Thesis on nuclear deterrence ===
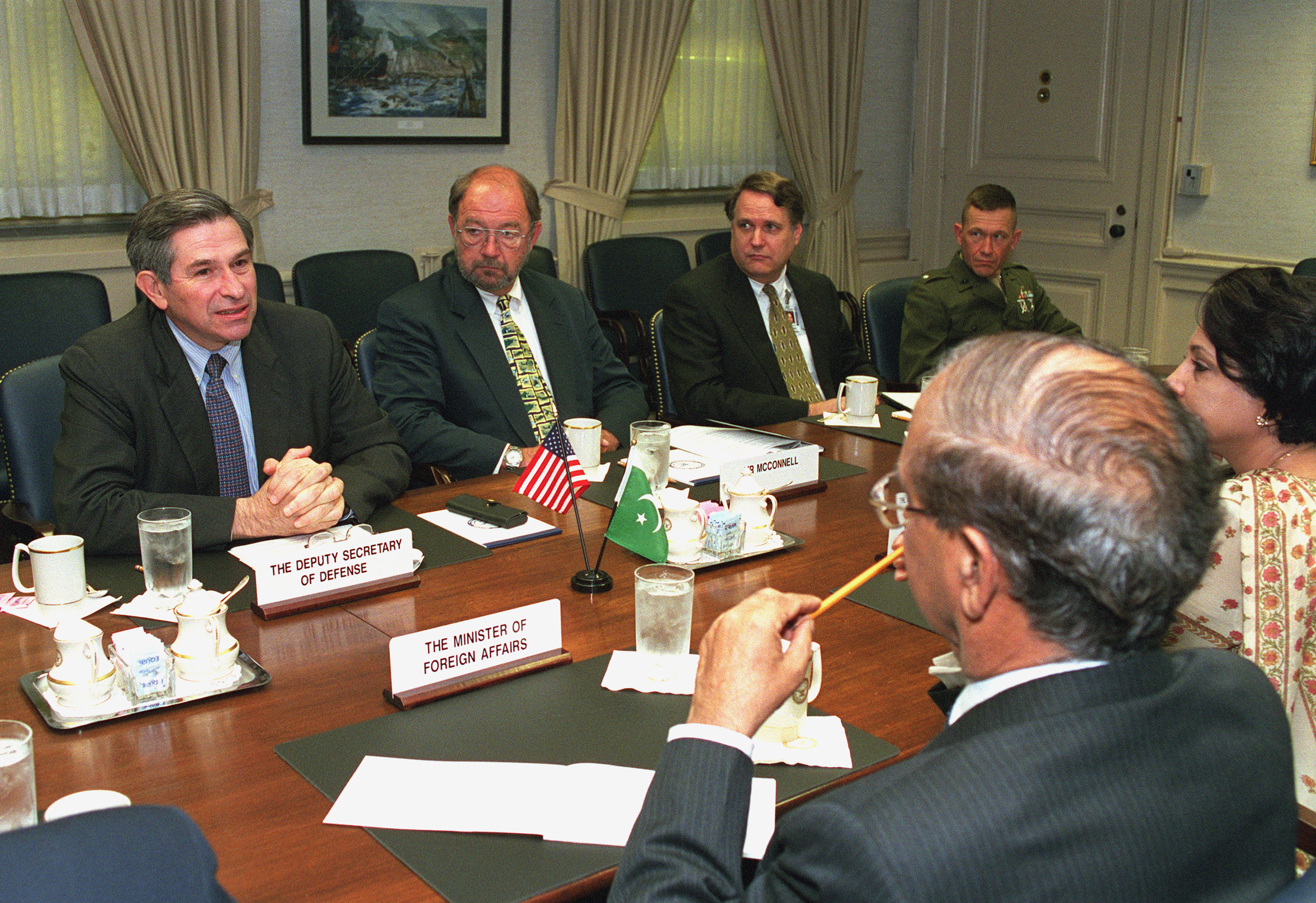
Abdul Sattar (left foreground) discussing with Deputy Secretary of Defense Paul Wolfowitz, 2001.

After retiring from nearly 40 years long Foreign service career, Sattar authored foreign policy and nuclear strategy related articles in Pakistan Observer. In 1993–94, Sattar took up the fellowship at the US Institute of Peace and authored a research paper on "Reducing Nuclear Dangers in South Asia". Another notable research paper of his, "Shimla Pact: Negotiating Under Duress", was published in journals in Islamabad and New Delhi in 1995. He also contributed the section on foreign policy in the book Pakistan in Perspective 1947–1997 published by Oxford University Press on the fiftieth anniversary of Pakistan.

=== Critical literature ===
- Shahi, Abdul Sattar; foreword by Agha (2010). Pakistan's foreign policy,1947–2009 : a concise history (2nd ed.). Karachi: Oxford University Press. ISBN 978-0199060238.

Diplomatic posts
Preceded by Niaz A. Naik	Foreign Secretary of Pakistan; 1986–1988	Succeeded by Humayun Khan
Political offices
Preceded by Sahabzada Yaqub Khan	Foreign Minister of Pakistan (caretaker); 1993	Succeeded by Farooq Leghari
Preceded by Sartaj Aziz	Foreign Minister of Pakistan; 1999–2002	Succeeded by Khurshid Mahmud Kasuri
