= Zafar Hilaly =

Pakistani political analyst and diplomat

- ظفر ہلالی

Personal details
- Spouse: Shamim Hilaly
- Relations: Tyabji family (maternal), Agha Shahi (uncle)
- Parent: Agha Hilaly
- Education: Highgate School

Zafar Ali Hilaly (Urdu: ظفر ہلالی, born 1942) is a Pakistani political analyst and diplomat who has previously served as his country's ambassador to Yemen, Nigeria, and from February 2001 Italy. He was educated at Highgate School.

Hilaly is a columnist and frequently writes for newspapers such as the Daily Times, The Express Tribune, and The News International. Additionally, he makes frequent appearances on 92 News in his capacity as an analyst. He is the son of Agha Hilaly, who served as Pakistan's Ambassador to the United States from 1966–1977. His uncle Agha Shahi served as the Foreign Minister of Pakistan in the Zia ul-Haq government.

He is married to Shamim Hilaly, a Pakistani television and film actress.
