= Tanvir Ahmad Khan =

Pakistani diplomat (1932–2013)

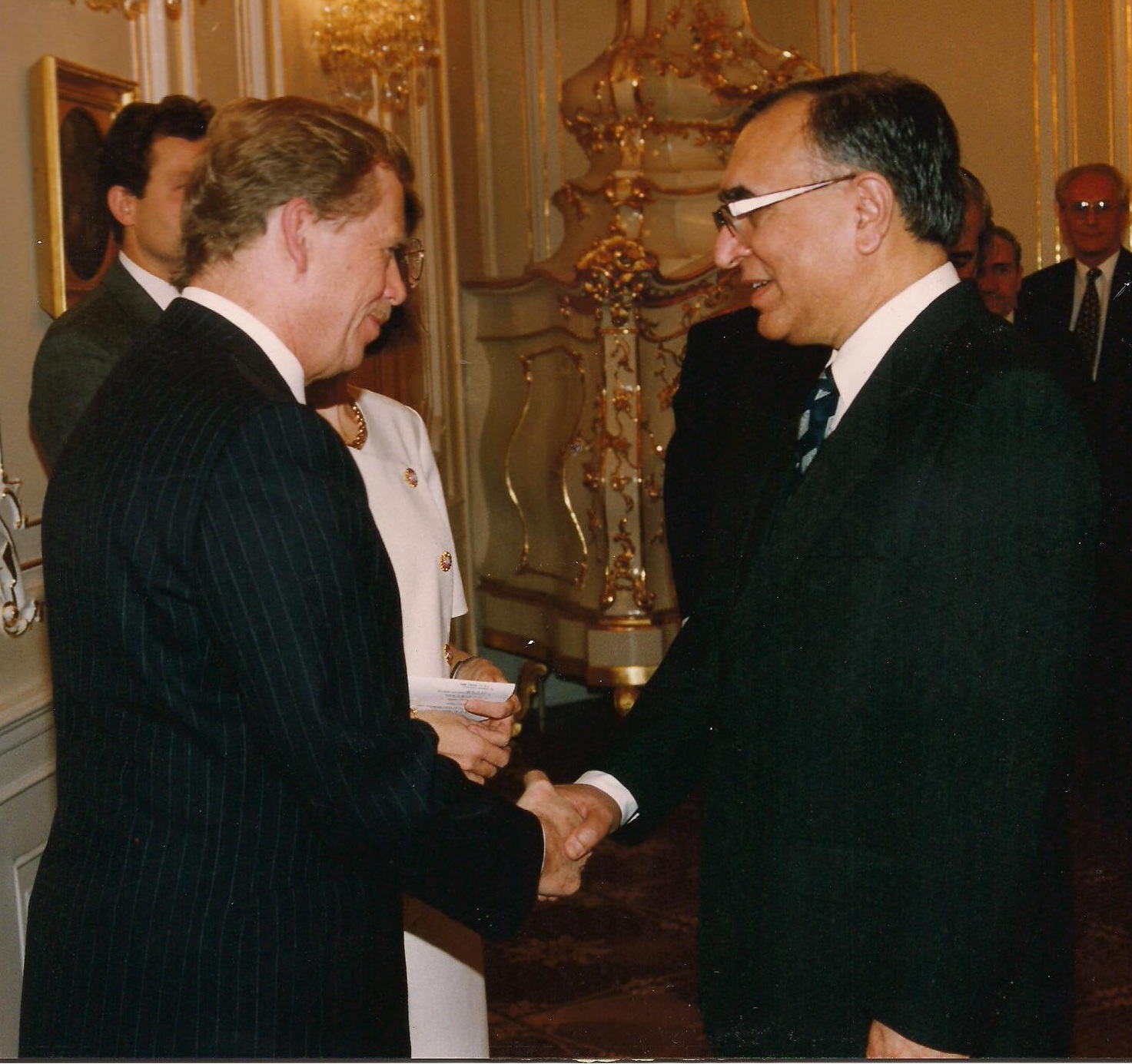
- Ambassador Tanvir A. Khan presenting credentials to President Vaclav Havel in Prague

19th Foreign Secretary of Pakistan
- In office 30 December 1989 – 30 August 1990
- President: Ghulam Ishaq Khan
- Prime Minister: Benazir Bhutto
- Preceded by: Humayun Khan
- Succeeded by: Shahryar Khan

Personal details
- Born: 12 June 1932 Hoshiarpur, Punjab, British India
- Died: 16 November 2013 (aged 81) Islamabad, Pakistan
- Education: Government College, Lahore; Brasenose College, University of Oxford

Tanvir Ahmad Khan (12 June 1932 – 16 November 2013) was a Pakistani diplomat.

== Early life ==
Khan was born to the Niazi Pathans of Hoshiarpur, in north-eastern Punjab, in June 1932. His father, Nazir Ahmad Khan, was an educationist who spent his working life striving to uplift the educational abilities of young Muslims, many of whom were from underprivileged backgrounds. When Pakistan became independent in 1947, Tanvir Ahmad Khan and his parents migrated to Lahore, where Khan continued his schooling, later enrolling at the Government College, Lahore.

== Education ==
Tanvir Ahmad Khan was educated at Government College, Lahore and later continued his studies at Brasenose College, Oxford. At Oxford, Tanvir Ahmad Khan studied English Literature – earning BA Honours / MA degrees. Thereafter, he returned to Government College, Lahore to teach English Literature at his former alma mater, before leaving academia to join government service.

== Career ==
He retired as the Foreign Secretary of Pakistan. He held various key diplomatic offices during his long career, including serving as ambassador in Moscow (Russian Federation), Paris (France), Tehran (Iran) and Dhaka (Bangladesh). Khan was Foreign Secretary during the Government of Benazir Bhutto (1989–90).

Dr. Khan worked closely with Sahabzada Yaqub Khan and enjoyed a close friendship with him.

== Diplomatic service and public offices ==
Khan served as Pakistan's ambassador to the Russian Federation, Bangladesh, Czechoslovakia, Iran, France, and was accredited to Ireland and Finland. Before he served as Pakistan's ambassador, he had held senior positions in Pakistan's missions in London, Bonn, Kabul and at the Ministry of Foreign Affairs headquarters in Islamabad (including additional foreign secretary and director general).

=== Foreign Secretary ===
Khan served as the 19th Foreign Secretary under the Government of Benazir Bhutto in 1989-90 and twice served as Information Secretary of Pakistan.

== Death ==
After retiring, Khan twice served as chairman and director general of the Institute of Strategic Studies in Islamabad.

Tanvir Ahmad Khan died on 11 November 2013 at age 81 in Islamabad, Pakistan.

== Publications ==
Tanvir Ahmad Khan's articles on foreign affairs and domestic politics have been published in many major newspapers and journals (number of articles estimated to be well over 500) including The Express Tribune (affiliate of the International Herald Tribune), The News International – Islamabad, The Daily Times (Pakistan), Dawn- Karachi, and Gulf News, (UAE).

== News media appearances ==
Before his death during his long career, he used to appear in numerous TV and radio discussions and programmes concerning foreign affairs and international relations including BBC World Service, CNN, Voice of America, NDTV India, Aljazeera (Qatar), PTV News, Geo News, ARY Digital Network, News One and Aaj News. Khan used to also deliver lectures on foreign policy to members of the Pakistan Armed Forces, civil service and diplomatic corps in Pakistan and at think tanks and universities across Pakistan.

Diplomatic posts
Preceded by Humayun Khan	Foreign Secretary of Pakistan; 1989–1990	Succeeded by Shahryar Khan
