= National Security Committee (Pakistan) =

Institutional and consultative body of the Government of Pakistan

National Security Committee قومی سلامتی مجلس

Agency overview
- Formed: March 25, 1969; 57 years ago
- Headquarters: Prime Minister's Office
- Agency executives: Prime Minister of Pakistan (Chairman); (Federal Secretary National Security Division)
- Parent agency: Prime Minister's Office

The National Security Committee (Urdu: قومی سلامتی مجلس) (reporting name: NSC) is a federal institutional and consultative body chaired by the prime minister of Pakistan as its chairman. The NSC is a principal forum that is mandated for considering national security and foreign policy matters with the senior national security advisers and Cabinet ministers. The idea and inception of National Security Council was first conceived in 1969 under the President Yahya Khan, its functions were to advise and assist the president and prime minister on national security and foreign policies.

The National Security Council was re-created by then-President and former General Pervez Musharraf in April 2004 under the National Security Council Act. Although, the NSC remains to as a statutory body, the National Security Council is not active since 2008, and the Cabinet Committee on National Security is fulfilling the role and purpose of the NSC. The first National Security Adviser was Tariq Aziz who was appointed in 2004 and was preceded by Major-General (retired) Mahmud Durrani in 2008. Since Durrani's deposing by Prime Minister Yousaf Raza Gillani in 2009, there has been no appointed new NSC adviser since then. The NSC was abandoned by the government of Pakistan Peoples Party (PPP), with a unified confirmations from the Parliament, and its functions has been taken under control by the Defence Cabinet Committee as of 2009.

The council was revived under Nawaz Sharif, who presides over meetings of the council when there is an emergency, such as hostilities between India and Pakistan, or a chance to discuss events related to the insurgency.

== Structure ==
=== Former Constitution Basis ===
The Constitution of Pakistan in the past provided for the National Security Council. However, the provision was repealed by the 18th Amendment.

=== Permanent Officiates ===
The membership position does not depend on the will of the chairman, who is the elected Prime Minister of Pakistan. Depending on the agenda of the meeting, other concerned persons are also invited in the meeting of the NSC.

Structure of the Pakistan National Security Committee
Ex-Officio members and permanent officials	Public office and Statutory
Chairman of the National Security Committee	Prime Minister of Pakistan
Secretary	Secretary, National Security Division
Advisor	National Security Advisor
Military Advisor	Chief of Defence Forces (Pakistan)
Statutory Attendees	Minister of Defence; Minister of Foreign Affairs; Minister of Interior; Minister of Finance and Revenue; Minister of Information and Broadcasting
Military Attendees	Chief of Army Staff; Chief of Air Staff; Chief of Navy Staff
Additional attendees	Secretary, Cabinet Division

The usual cabinet-level meetings at the NSC takes the following agenda and members of the following authorities are usually invited:

Current

- National Command Authority (NCA)
- Cabinet Committee on National Security (C^{2}NS)
- Economic Coordination Committee (ECC)

Former

- Executive Committee of the Space Research Council (ECSRC) — deactivated since 1985.

== Functions ==
The Council serves as a forum for consultation for the president and the federal government on matters of national security including the sovereignty, integrity, defence and security of the State and crisis management in general. It may also formulate recommendations to the president and the federal government in such matters.

=== National Security Advisers ===
No	Name	Term of Office		Previous service cadre	Prime Minister
1	Major-General Ghulam Omar	25 March 1969	20 December 1971	Inter-Services Selection Branch	Nurul Amin
2	General Tikka Khan	3 March 1972	1 March 1976	Inter-Services Selection Branch	Zulfikar Ali Bhutto
3	Major-General Rao Farman Ali	29 March 1985	17 August 1988	Inter-Services Selection Branch	Muhammad Khan Junejo
4	Tariq Aziz	4 April 2004	18 August 2008	Central Superior Services	Shaukat Aziz; Yousaf Raza Gillani
5	Major-General Mahmud Ali Durrani	19 August 2008	7 January 2009	Inter-Services Selection Branch	Yousaf Raza Gillani
6	Sartaj Aziz	7 July 2013	22 October 2015	Central Superior Services	Nawaz Sharif
7	Lieutenant-General Nasser Khan Janjua	23 October 2015	27 June 2018	Inter-Services Selection Branch	Nawaz Sharif
8	Moeed Yusuf	24 December 2019	10 April 2022	—	Imran Khan
9	Asim Malik	30 April 2025	Incumbent	Inter-Services Selection Branch	Shehbaz Sharif

== History ==
=== Inception: 1969–1971 ===
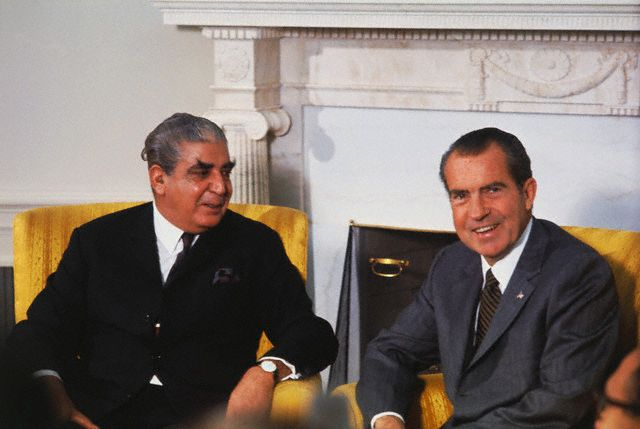
President Yahya Khan with President Richard Nixon established the NSC as akin to the American National Security Council (NSC) in 1969.

The Pakistan military has been sending many recommendations for the establishment of the National Security Council as akin and counterpart to the American National Security Council. A comprehensive report on NSC was written and submitted by the Chief of Naval Staff, Vice Admiral S.M. Ahsan in 1968. Admiral Ahsan submitted his handwritten report to President Yahya Khan's staff in Islamabad in 1969 and emphasized support for the establishment of the military dominated national security council composed of senior civil and military officials who would advise the government on national security issues and propose strategies to overcome the challenges involving the foreign policy matters. The proposal was forwarded to President Office, and then to President Yahya Khan with strong recommendations for its approval.

In 1969, President Yahya Khan established the National Security Council, after signing and issuing the presidential decree to establish this consultative institution. Major-General Ghulam Omar was appointed NSC's first secretary and was posted at the General Headquarters (GHQ) to perform operations of NSC under President Yahya Khan. The NSC secretariat was part of the President Office and the Chief Martial Law Administrator (CMLA) and was directly under the control of the military establishment which then-functioned under President Yahya Khan's staff.

The NSC secretariat was highly unpopular in public and political circles of Pakistan, and it quickly gained notoriety in civil society due to its involvement in political and civilian affairs. The NSC secretariat did not figure in the decision-making of the military government because President Yahya Khan ran his government administration as personalized enterprise relaying heavily on his close and trusted military and bureaucratic advisers. The NSC Secretary, Major-General Ghulam Omar, was less focused on national issues whilst kept his interest in combat development. The NSC Secretariat under Yahya Khan was only a paper organization.

=== The Genesis: 1985–1999 ===
1998 NSC Debates on Nuclear tests
Participants in debates	Cadre/Office	Vote	Notes
Nawaz Sharif	Prime Minister	check	Voted and Ordered tests
Sartaj Aziz	Finance Minister	X mark	Opposed but later retraced.
Mushahid Hussain	Information Minister	check	First to propose in favor of tests
Gohar Ayub	Foreign Minister	check	
Ishaq Dar	Commerce Minister	check	Support in favor of tests
Shamshad Ahmad	Foreign Secretary	check	
Gen Jehangir Karamat	Chairman Joint Chiefs; Chief of army staff	check	Spoke in favor but left decision on Sharif
Adm. Fasih Bokhari	Chief of Naval Staff	X mark	Opposed tests on moral ground
ACM PQ Mehdi	Chief of Air Staff	check	Supported and provide logistics
Dr.Abdul Qadeer Khan	Senior scientist at KRL	check	Debated and proposed tests
Dr.Ishfaq Ahmad	Senior scientist at PAEC	check	Supported in favor tests
Dr.Samar Mubarakmand	Senior scientist at PAEC	check	Debated in favor of tests
Munir Ahmad Khan	Senior scientist at PAEC	check	Debated in favor of tests
Ahmad Kamal	Representative to UN	check	Diplomatic in favor of tests
Javed Hashmi	Environmental Minister	check	Debated in favor of tests

The concept of National Security Council as a bridge of stabilizing the civil-military relations has always been favoured by the military spectrum of Pakistan since 1971. In 1973, Pakistan military has sent repeated recommendations of peculiar structure of the NSC in which senior military commanders of Pakistan Armed Forces are ensured a seat at the table. The proposal was met with heated criticism in the state parliament and Prime Minister Zulfikar Ali Bhutto instead issued a white paper on Higher Defence Organisations (HDO) in May 1976, outlining the institutional arrangements for dealing with defence and security affairs. This led the ultimate creation of the Defence Committee of the Cabinet (DCC) which has the mandate of responsibility of national defence rested with the prime minister. The DCC conveys matters to other important organisations involved in the national security decision-making on security affairs included the Ministry of Defence (MoD), the JS HQ of the Joint Chiefs of Staff Committee and its Chairman, the Chiefs of Staff of the Pakistan Armed Forces.

After the enactment of the martial law by chief of army staff General Zia-ul-Haq in 1977, the DCC had remained active. After holding successful referendum, followed by non-partisan general elections in 1985, President General Zia-ul-Haq authored and inserted Article 152-A to the Constitution through the Revival of the Constitution Order (RCO), in March 1985. This led the establish a National Security Council for accommodating the high-ranking military leadership in policy making. The NSC was empowered to "make recommendations relating to the issue of a Proclamation of Emergency under Article 232, security of Pakistan and any other matter of national importance that may be referred to it by the President in consultation with the Prime Minister."

The NSC was opposed by most political circles and it had to be dropped as a part of the deal with the Parliament to get the parliamentary approval for the revised version of the Revival of the Constitution Order (RCO) as Eighth Amendment to the Constitution of Pakistan, in October 1985. The NSC was dissolved by Prime Minister Benazir Bhutto in 1993 and reactivated the DCC operationalize in its place.

From 1998–99, there were only two NSC meetings took place which were chaired by the Prime Minister Sharif; first occasion when Sharif ordered Pakistan's nuclear tests in response to India's tests, as part of his tit-for-tat policy. At the NSC cabinet meeting, the Pakistani government, military, scientific, and civilian officials were participating in a debate, broadening, and complicating the decision-making process. Although, General Karamat debated towards presenting the national security and military point of view, the final decision was left on Prime Minister Nawaz Sharif's say. After the decision was made, General Karamat was notified of Prime Minister Nawaz Sharif's decision and asked the military to be stand-by orders. After providing the joint military logistics, the nuclear tests were eventually carried out on 28 May 1998, as Chagai-I, and on 30 May 1998 as codename: Chagai-II. As dawn broke over the Chagai mountains, Pakistan became the world's seventh nuclear power.

Secondly, the NSC meeting took place during the heights of the Kargil War in 1999. Empowerment of the NSC at the bureaucratic level was the primary issue that led to the forced relieve of Chairman Joint Chiefs General Jehangir Karamat in 1998. In an absence of the forum, the upheavals in civil–military relations led to the dismissal of Prime Minister Nawaz Sharif in 1999 when he tried to dismissed then-Chairman Joint Chiefs Pervez Musharraf.

=== Reconstruction and developments: 2004–2008 ===
2007 NSC Debates on Lal Masjid
Participants in debates	Cadre/Office	Vote
Pervez Musharraf	President (Chief of army staff)	check
Shaukat Aziz	Prime Minister (Finance Minister)	check
Gen Ehsan-ul-Haq	Chairman Joint Chiefs	check
Khurshid Kasuri	Foreign Minister	check
Adm Afzal Tahir	Chief of Naval Staff	X mark
Tariq Aziz	NSA	check
ACM Tanvir Ahmed	Chief of Air Staff	check
Aftab Sherpao	Interior Minister	check
Shujaat Hussain	President, PML(Q)	X mark
Ijaz-ul-Haq	Religion minister	X mark
Tariq Azim	Pakistan Senator	X mark
Ali Khan	Attorney General	X mark
Muhammad Durrani	Information Minister	X mark

After staging a coup d'état against the government of Prime Minister Nawaz Sharif in 1999, Chairman joint chiefs Pervez Musharraf announced the establishment of six member national security council in his first television speech. Through a presidential act, the concept of NSC was formally established under an order of the chief executive on 30 October 1999. The presidential order also led the establishment of the National Reconstruction Bureau (NRB) as a think tank. Although NRB gained quick constitutional establishment in 2000 the NSC's constitutional establishment did not really take off due to political consensus over the establishment of this institution. Finally in 2004, Prime Minister Shaukat Aziz presented the National Security Council through an Act of Parliament and succeeded in constitutionally establishing the NSC for the first time in April 2004. Originally the NSC bill proposed that the NSC would also deal with the "matters relating to democracy, governance, and inter-provincial harmony." This sentence was later controversially replaced by President Musharraf with "crisis management" without explaining its operational. President and Chief of Army Staff General Pervez Musharraf created the office in Aiwan-e-Sadr, and appoint civil bureaucrat Tariq Aziz as the first National Security Advisor. According to PILDT, since its reestablishment, Musharraf conveyed very few national security meetings, and most meetings were conducted to discuss political situations only.

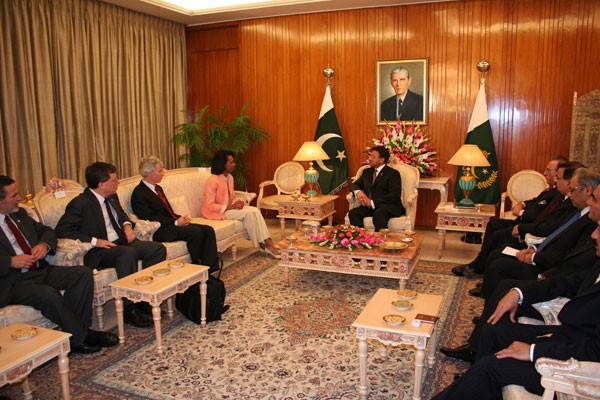
President Musharraf and his key NSC staff meeting with Condoleezza Rice and American NSC staff.

He resigned from the post of NSC secretariat when Musharraf resigned from presidency on 18 August 2008. He was succeeded by Mahmud Ali Durrani as the second National Security Advisor, directly reporting to the Prime minister Secretariat. Durrani was notably deposed by the prime minister Yousaf Raza Gillani in January 2009 for "not consulting the Prime Minister while giving statements on foreign relation matters". The matter in question was the acceptance by the Government of Pakistan of the Pakistani nationality of the sole surviving terrorist Ajmal Kasab, who was involved in the 2008 Mumbai attacks and was in the custody of the Mumbai police.

=== Abolition and suspension (2008–2009) ===
After the incident, Prime Minister Gillani vowed to abolish the National Security Council in February 2009. The NSC remains to stay as statue on the constitution, however, the NSC secretariat is not active since 2008, but instead the Defence Committee of the Cabinet is re-activated in its place by the current government.

Since 2009, there has been no appointed new NSC adviser and no national security meetings have been conducted since then. Its operations and mandate has been integrated to the DCC meeting, nine occurring since 2009.

=== Restorative status (2013–present) ===
Upon conclusion of the general elections in 2013, the PML(N)'s strategists indicated the restoration of the NSC to the news media. On immediate basis, Prime Minister Sharif appointed Sartaj Aziz as National Security Advisor (NSA). On 9 September 2013, Prime Minister Sharif proposed that dialogue with the Pakistani military would create a civil-military partnership, putting the military and an elected government on the same page for the first time in Pakistan's history. After reconstituting the Cabinet Committee on National Security (C^{2}NS), with military gaining representation in the country's politics, the NSC came into effect as an influential policy institution.

Decision came from Prime Minister Sharif to reconstitute the NSC to improve coordination between the civil and military institutions in order to deal with a nagging far-right insurgency that has killed and maimed thousands of Pakistanis over the last few years.

According to the political scientist and civic-military relations expert, Aqil Shah, Sharif finally did what exactly former chairman joint chiefs General Karamat had called for in 1998. Since then, the NSC meetings with Prime Minister Sharif have been taking place frequently.

== See also ==
- Constitution of Pakistan
- Pakistan Armed Forces

== Sources ==
=== Additional works on NSC ===
- Durrani, Mahmood Ali. (21 September 2013). "On National Security". thenews.com.pk/. Islamabad, Pakistan: News International.
- Jaspal, Zafar Nawaz (16 March 2002). "National Security Council: Implications for Pakistan's Political System". defencejournal.com. Karachi, Sindh, Pakistan: Defence Journal. Archived from the original on 23 September 2015.
- Hussain, PhD, Dr. Riffat (9 October 2013). "Securing the system". Opinion articiel written and published by Karachi University's political science professor Dr. Riffat Hussain. Islamabad: Herald, Dawn area studies. Herald, Dawn area studies. Archived from the original on 20 February 2014.

=== Constitutional analysis ===
- Constitution of Pakistan. "Article: 152A National Security Council". pakistanconstitutionlaw.com. Supreme Court of Pakistan Press. Archived from the original on 6 January 2014.
- Government of Pakistan (12 October 1999). "Appointment of National Security Council". pakistani.org. Govt. of Pakistan.

=== Bibliography ===
- Henderson, Annalisa; Miller, Isabel (2006). "Pakistan". In Preston, Ian; Rowe, Annamarie (eds.). Political Chronology of Central, South, and East Asia. London [u.k]: Europa Publications. p. 277. ISBN 1135356807.
- Akbar, M.K. (1997). Pakistan from Jinnah to Sharif. New Delhi: Mittal Publications. ISBN 8170996740.
