= Humayun Khan (diplomat) =

Pakistani diplomat (1932–2022)

Personal details
- Born: 31 August 1932
- Died: 22 September 2022 (aged 90)
- Occupation: Ambassador, Foreign Secretary, High Commissioner

Humayun Khan (31 August 1932 – 22 September 2022) was a Pakistani politician and diplomat who served as Foreign Secretary, and as High Commissioner to India and the United Kingdom. He was serving as the Chairman of the Institute of Rural Management (IRM).

He studied at Bishop Cotton School, Shimla, between 1941 and 1947.

Diplomatic posts
Preceded by Abdul Sattar	Foreign Secretary of Pakistan; 1988–1989	Succeeded by Tanvir Ahmad Khan
Preceded by Shahryar Khan	Pakistan High Commissioner to the United Kingdom; 1990–1992	Succeeded by Wajid Shamsul Hasan
