= Neither a Hawk Nor a Dove =

2015 book by Khurshid Mahmud Kasuri

Neither a Hawk nor a Dove: An Insider's Account of Pakistan's Foreign Policy
- Author: Khurshid Mahmud Kasuri
- Language: English
- Genre: Nonfiction
- Publisher: Oxford University Press Pakistan
- Publication date: 2015
- Publication place: Pakistan
- Media type: Print (Hardcover)
- Pages: 896 pages
- ISBN: 9780199401932

Neither a Hawk nor a Dove: An insider's account of Pakistan's foreign policy is a book written by Khurshid Mahmud Kasuri. The book is the first comprehensive account by a Pakistani Foreign minister who contributed in moving the peace process with India forward. This was hailed as the most promising dialogue between Pakistan and India since Independence. It provides a detailed analysis of the Kashmir issue and the complex Pakistan-US-Afghanistan-India quadrangular relationship. Kasuri believes that, whenever two statesmen are at the helm in India and Pakistan, for improvement of relations, they would have to revert to the framework formulated during his tenure as Foreign Minister.

The author writes frankly about his Indian counterparts, Pranab Mukherjee, Natwar Singh, and Yashwant Sinha, and also Manmohan Singh and Atal Bihari Vajpayee. Rare insights are provided into the workings of the Pakistan Army, the contributions of the Foreign Office, and the author's warm but complex relationship with former President Pervez Musharraf. He also covers Pakistan's relations with China, Saudi Arabia, Turkey, and Iran. On Bangladesh, his comments reflect nostalgia for old connections. The narrative is intricately balanced with the author providing anecdotes, both personal and political, alongside his observations on serious issues. On foreign policy matters, he deals objectively with those on the other side of the political divide.

Kasuri, writes in his book:

"Pakistan’s decision to join the international campaign against terrorism and the removal of the Taliban from power in Afghanistan created grounds for a new understanding with Tehran. We were also conscious that instability in Afghanistan would have a deleterious effect on Pakistan, since a stable Afghanistan, at peace with itself, was also in our interest."
