= Siddiq Khan Kanju =

Pakistani politician

Mohammad Siddiq Khan Kanju
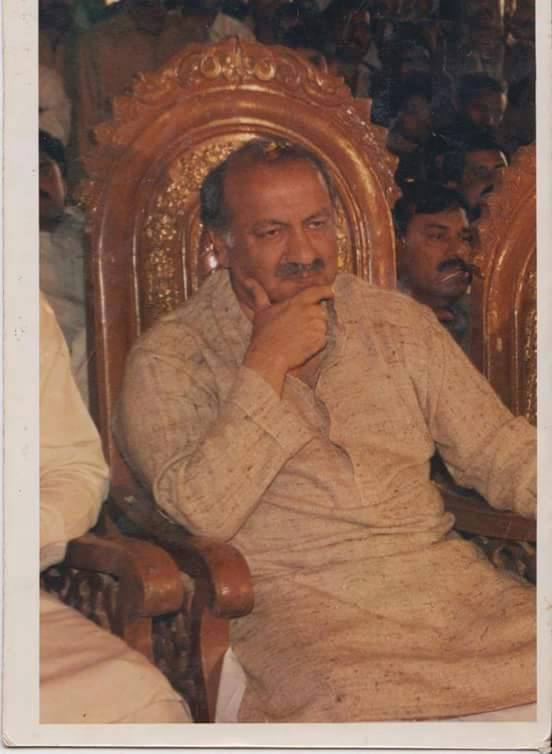
- Mohammad Siddiq Khan Kanju

Minister of State for Foreign Affairs
- In office 11 July 1997 – 12 October 1999
- Prime Minister: Nawaz Sharif
- Preceded by: Sahibzada Muhammad Nazeer Khan
- Succeeded by: Inam-ul-Haq
- In office 10 September 1991 – 18 July 1993
- Prime Minister: Nawaz Sharif
- Preceded by: Akram Zaki (acting)
- Succeeded by: Abdul Sattar (caretaker)

Personal details
- Born: 2 December 1951 Alipur Kanju, Kahror Pacca, Punjab Province, Pakistan
- Died: 28 July 2001 Kahror Pacca, Punjab Province, Pakistan
- Party: Pakistan Muslim League
- Education: Punjab University, Lahore

Mohammad Siddiq Khan Kanju (born in Alipur Kanju village, Kahror Pacca, Lodhran district in Punjab province, Pakistan, died in Kahror Pakka in July 2001) was a Pakistani politician who served as Minister of State for Foreign Affairs.

== Education ==
Kanju had his early education from Sadiq Public School in Bahawalpur, after completing his A-levels he went to Government College, Lahore, and graduated in English Literature. Afterward he went to Punjab University, Lahore and obtained an LLB.

== Politics ==
After completing his law studies he decided to enter politics from his home constituency Kahror Pakka. In the 1977 general elections, he ran for the Provisional Assembly seat, but the elections were postponed. Again in 1985 he became Member of the National Assembly on non-party election, and served as a Parliamentary Secretary for Agriculture. The government was dissolved in 1988 and he was appointed as a caretaker Education Minister.

During the first Benazir Bhutto government, Kanju for the first time became a part of the opposition headed by Nawaz Sharif. In the general elections of 1990, Kanju was for the third time elected Member of National Assembly from Lodhran, and at the behest of his friend and mentor Hamid Raza Gilani, joined the Nawaz Sharif cabinet as Minister of State for Foreign Affairs (1990–1993). During this period in 1991 he got changed Lodhran's status to a district, which was a tehsil of Multan District.

In the General Elections of 1993, Kanju who was perceived as a success of the Muslim League, lost his National Assembly seat from Lodhran district. Jang reported his failure was due to extensive travel made as Minister of State and absence from the constituency. During the period 1993-1996 Kanju spent most of his time in Lodhran. He was again elected Member of National Assembly on Muslim League ticket. Once again he became part of Muhammad Nawaz Sharif's Cabinet, as Minister of State for Foreign Affairs, and served in this capacity until the Muslim League Government was dissolved by the military coup of 1999.

When Mian Nawaz Sharif left the country, Siddiq Kanju with his group of members joined the new faction of Muslim League headed by Chaudry Shujjat Hussain, former Interior Minister under Nawaz Sharif, and Mian Azhar who was a former Governor of Punjab.

During the local government elections of 2001, once again Kanju actively started campaign in his constituency. On 28 July when he was visiting a Counsellor shop in Kahror Pakka city, he was shot dead by three or four assassins along with MajorMuhammad Aslam Khan Joiya, ex MPA . One of his party workers were also shot. The place where Kanju died was the same where he gave his maiden speech as an incumbent in 1977 and started his career in politics.

Siddiq Kanju died at the age of 49 years. His burial was attended by thousands of people. People from all walks of life condemned this act, and President Musharraf responded by saying it was a big loss. Interior Minister Moin-u-din Haider and Governor Sind, later Chairman Senate, acting Prime Minister and President Muhammad Mian Soomro took special notice and directed IG Punjab to take strict action.

Two assassins were arrested by the police later in 2002.

Political offices
Preceded by Zain Noorani	Minister of State for Foreign Affairs; 10 September 1991 - 18 July 1993	Succeeded by 2nd term
Preceded by 1st term	2nd term 11 July 1997 - 12 October 1999	Succeeded by Inam-ul-Haq
