= Minister of State for Foreign Affairs (Pakistan) =

- State emblem of Pakistan
- Incumbent; Vacant
- Ministry of Foreign Affairs
- Member of: Cabinet, National Security Council
- Reports to: Foreign Minister of Pakistan
- Residence: Islamabad, Pakistan
- Nominator: Prime Minister of Pakistan
- Appointer: President of Pakistan
- Term length: Pleasure of the Prime Minister
- Inaugural holder: Aziz Ahmed
- Formation: 1972; 54 years ago

The Minister of State for Foreign Affairs (MSFA) is the junior minister within the Cabinet of Pakistan who serves as the second highest-ranking member of the Ministry of Foreign Affairs, after the Foreign Minister.

During the absence of a Foreign Minister, Minister of State takes the de facto charge Ministry of Foreign Affairs. There were two such instances in the past; Siddiq Khan Kanju was the effective Foreign Minister from 1991 to 1993 and Inam-ul-Haq for four months in 2002.

== List of ministers of state for foreign affairs of Pakistan ==
No.	Name	Entered office	Left office
1	Aziz Ahmed	7 February 1973	28 March 1977
2	Zain Noorani	10 April 1985	29 May 1988
3	Siddiq Khan Kanju	10 September 1991	18 July 1993
4	Siddiq Khan Kanju	11 July 1997	12 October 1999
5	Inam-ul-Haq	22 June 2002	22 November 2002
6	Makhdoom Khusro Bakhtiar	4 September 2004	15 November 2007
7	Nawabzada Malik Amad Khan	4 November 2008	9 February 2011
8	Hina Rabbani Khar	11 February 2011	20 July 2011
9	Nawabzada Malik Amad Khan	20 July 2011	25 March 2013
10	Hina Rabbani Khar	19 April 2022	10 August 2023

== See also ==
- Ministry of Foreign Affairs
- Foreign Minister of Pakistan
- Foreign Secretary of Pakistan
