= Saulat Nagi =

Australian-Pakistani writer

Saulat Nagi is an Australian-Pakistani writer. He has authored several books on socialism (Gramscian and Frankfurt schools) and history. He is a regular columnist in one of Pakistan's leading English language dailies, the Daily Times. He has written for other Pakistani dailies too, including The Nation, The Asian Mirror and The Frontier Post, as well as for local and international web-based news portals. He is a medical doctor by training. He received his bachelor's degree in Medicine from King Edward Medical University, Lahore, followed by postgraduate training in Vienna.

He has authored six books in Urdu language, which were reviewed by leading dailies in Pakistan (e.g. Dawn). Among them are two biographies, one about Che Guevara, and the other about Fidel Castro. Other published works include: “Socialism or Barbarism”; “The Origin of Monotheistic Religions”; “Capitalism: A Civilizational Clash or Civilization of Clash?”; and a book on poetry “The Promise of Love”. He also translated Lenin’s work “Materialism and Empirio-criticism” in Urdu. His first novel in English, titled "And When She Smiled" was published in 2017.

In a whirlwind of intolerance, his home in Pakistan was attacked in 2014 but he escaped unhurt. He is based in Sydney, and spends his time between Australia and Pakistan.
