= Zain Noorani =

4th minister of state for foreign affairs of Pakistan

4th Minister of State for Foreign Affairs
- In office 10 April 1985 – 20 December 1986
- President: Muhammad Zia-ul-Haq
- Prime Minister: Muhammad Khan Junejo
- Preceded by: Agha Shahi
- Succeeded by: Siddiq Khan Kanju

Personal details
- Born: 22 May 1927 Bombay, British India (Present-day Mumbai, India)
- Died: 18 December 1992 (aged 65) Karachi, Pakistan

Zain Noorani (22 May 1927 – 18 December 1992) was a Pakistani politician who served as the 4th minister of state for foreign affairs from 10 April 1985 to 20 December 1986 and deputy minister of foreign affairs in 1988. He also served as minister of state for foreign affairs with cabinet rank from 22 December 1986 to 29 May 1988.

After he was assigned to the ministry, he reportedly played central role in Geneva Accords. During the Soviet–Afghan War, Muhammad Khan Junejo removed Sahabzada Yaqub Khan from the ministry and appointed Noorani as the minister of state for foreign affairs to run foreign and defence affairs independently. Noorani was warned by then the prime minister Junejo to not run the ministry independently.

In 1988, Noorani had to participate in 1988 Geneva Accords, however, Muhammad Zia-ul-Haq asked him to sign only predetermined agreements as per military instructions relating Afghan peace process. General Zia-ul-Haq had also warned him that if he did not follow the military instructions, the Afghans would lynch him on the road. Junejo, on the other hand had instructed Noorani not return to Pakistan without signing peace deal, contradict to general Zia's decision, and as a result, he reached Geneva, Switzerland, but didn't participated in the meeting, citing health issues.
