= Ahmed Bugti =

Pakistani politician

Finance Minister of Balochistan

Personal details
- Died: 22 June 2005 Karachi, Pakistan
- Party: National Awami Party
- Relations: Akbar Bugti (brother)

Mir Ahmed Nawaz Khan Bugti was a Pakistani politician who served as finance minister in Balochistan's first provincial cabinet under Ataullah Mengal. He was the younger brother of Akbar Bugti.

== Political career ==
Bugti started his political career with the National Awami Party and was elected to the first Provincial Assembly of Balochistan in 1970. He was inducted as finance minister in Balochistan's first cabinet, headed by Ataullah Mengal, in 1972.

He was later elected to the National Assembly of Pakistan in the 1985 non-party general election from Dera Bugti. In 1993, he served as a federal minister in the caretaker government of Balakh Sher Mazari.
