= First Nawaz Sharif government =

1990s government under Pakistani Prime Minister Nawaz Sharif

First Nawaz Sharif Government
- 31st Cabinet of Pakistan
- 1990–1993
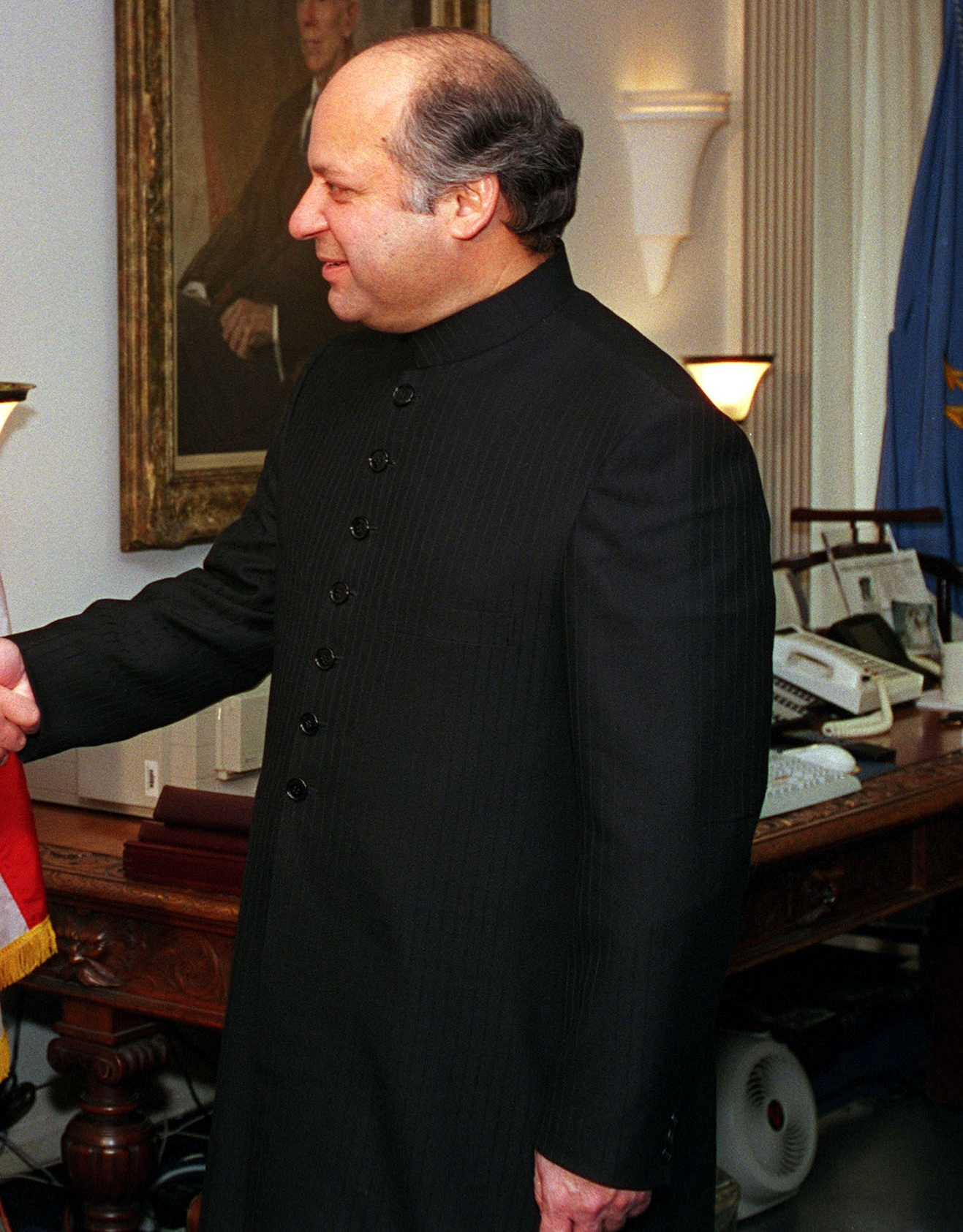
- Date formed: 9 November 1990
- Date dissolved: 18 April 1993

People and organisations
- Head of state: Ghulam Ishaq Khan
- Head of government: Nawaz Sharif
- Total no. of members: 18
- Member party: Islami Jamhoori Ittehad
- Status in legislature: Simple majority
- Opposition party: Pakistan Peoples Party

History
- Election: 1990 general election
- Outgoing election: 1993 general election
- Incoming formation: Jatoi caretaker government
- Outgoing formation: Mazari caretaker
- Predecessor: First Bhutto
- Successor: Second Benazir Bhutto government

The first Nawaz Sharif government under prime minister Nawaz Sharif was sworn into office on 9 November 1990, after the nine-party Islami Jamhoori Ittehad (IJI) unanimously nominated him the government head.

Nawaz Sharif’s government was elected as the on 1 November 1990, With Nawaz Sharif chosen as the 12th Prime Minister. The President, Ghulam Ishaq Khan dissolved his government in April 1993, which was later on reinstated by the Supreme Court of Pakistan. Sharif survived a serious constitutional crisis when President Khan attempted to dismiss him under article 58-2b, in April 1993, but he successfully challenged the decision in the Supreme Court. Sharif resigned from the post negotiating a settlement that resulted in the removal of President as well, in July 1993.

== Cabinet ==
Sharif's 18-member cabinet was one of the smallest in the country's history, especially compared to the record 58-member cabinet of his ousted predecessor Benazir Bhutto. Sharif insisted on bringing nearly a dozen politicians with links to Gen Zia-ul-Haq.

Amongst the 18 members initially selected for the cabinet, nine were from Punjab, two from the Islamabad Capital Territory, six from Sindh and one from Balochistan. The cabinet was later expanded to include representation from the North-West Frontier Province Although being a member of the IJI alliance, the Jamaat-e-Islami (JI) members declined to participate in Nawaz Sharif’s cabinet.

Ministry	Minister
Prime Minister, Ministry of Defence	Nawaz Sharif
Ministry of Foreign Affairs	Sahabzada Yaqub Khan
Ministry of Finance	Sartaj Aziz
Ministry of Industry, Ministry of Interior	Chaudhry Shujaat Hussain
Minister of State for Defence	Syed Ghous Ali Shah
Ministry of Law	Syed Fakhar Imam

=== Changes ===
- 9 March 1991 – Chaudhry Amir Hussain is appointed as the state minister for the Ministry of Law for the second time.
- April 1991 – Akram Zaki is made the acting federal minister for the Ministry of Foreign Affairs.
- 10 September 1991
  - Syed Ghous Ali Shah is appointed as the federal minister for the Ministry of Defence.
  - The prime minister retains the authority of the Ministry of Foreign Affairs and appoints Siddiq Khan Kanju as the state minister for the ministry.
  - *Chaudhary Abdul Ghafoor is appointed as the federal minister for the Ministry of Law.

== Major initiatives and actions ==
- Foreign Policy Actions
  - Joining the U.S-led coalition in the Gulf War
  - Worsened diplomatic relations with Ba'athist Iraq, and took diplomatic measures against Saddam Hussein
  - Improved relations with the United States of America
- Military Policy Actions
  - Operation Clean-up
- Economic Policy Actions
  - Began privatization process in Pakistan
  - Authorized the Pakistan Antarctic Programme
  - Began Economic liberalisation in Pakistan
- Social Policy Actions
  - Rise of Conservatism in Pakistan
