= Economic Coordination Committee (Pakistan) =

Federal Agency of the Government of Pakistan

Economic Coordination Committee Pakistan
- State emblem of Pakistan

Agency overview
- Formed: 1965; 61 years ago
- Jurisdiction: Government of Pakistan
- Status: Active
- Minister responsible: Shehbaz Sharif As Prime Minister of Pakistan, Chairperson
- Agency executive: Shehbaz Sharif, Chairperson

The Economic Coordination Committee (reporting name: ECC) (Urdu: اقتصادی رابطہ کمیٹی) is a principal federal institution and a consultative forum used by the people-elected Prime Minister of Pakistan as its chairman, concerning matters of the state's economic security, geoeconomic, political economic and financial endowment issues. Although it is often chaired by the Finance Minister and the senior economic officials as its members on multiple occasions, the key executive authorization on key economic policies are made by the Prime Minister of Pakistan who reserves the right to call upon and serves as the chairman of the ECC.

Established in 1965 by President Ayub Khan, its primary functions are to finalize executive economic decisions to national economy, and to assist the Prime Minister and his key staff on issues involving the economic security, threat of war, economic effects of nuclear weapons, and challenges in geoeconomic policies. The ECC served as Prime Minister's principal decision-making and consultative forum for coordinating economic security and geo-economic policies among various government institutions and ministries. The DCC is a counterpart of the national security councils of many other nations. Its national security counterpart is DCC, and counterpart of the Monetary Policy Committees of many other nations.

The Economic Coordination Committee (ECC) was formed in 1965 by the government, handing over the chairmanship of the (ECC) to Finance Minister of Pakistan as its central and designated chairman. The ECC was chaired by the finance minister with almost weekly meetings of its members, who are ministers in charge of economic ministries. However, after the 1971 war with India, its chairmanship was handed over to the Prime Minister of Pakistan, and in 1993, the ECC's chairmanship was permanently handed over to the Prime Minister of Pakistan. Along with its counterpart DCC, the ECC more densely emphasized its economic and financial role in country's nuclear command and control since the 1980s. In May 1998, the emergency meetings, along with the DCC, provided a great environment of its performance when Prime minister Nawaz Sharif ordered Pakistan's first public nuclear tests, Chagai-I which was followed by Chagai-II, after the DCC and ECC council conveyed various civil-military sessions with the Prime minister and the military leadership. The Economic Coordination Committee has control for all important economic decisions and finalizes, promulgated the economic policies in the country.

== See also ==
- Cabinet of Pakistan
- Economic Advisory Council (Pakistan)
