= Akram Zaki =

Pakistani diplomat

Pakistan Senator from Islamabad Capital Territory
- In office 21 March 1997 – 20 March 2002

Minister of Foreign Affairs acting
- In office April 1991 – 10 September 1991
- Prime Minister: Nawaz Sharif
- Preceded by: Sahabzada Yaqub Khan
- Succeeded by: Siddiq Khan Kanju

Personal details
- Born: 27 October 1931 Gujranwala, Punjab, British Raj (present Pakistan)
- Died: 30 November 2017 (aged 86) Islamabad, Pakistan
- Party: Pakistan Muslim League
- Education: Forman Christian College; University of the Punjab; The Fletcher School of Law and Diplomacy at Tufts University, United States
- Occupation: Diplomat, politician, human rights activist, writer
- Profession: Career diplomat

Akram Zaki (27 October 1931 – 30 November 2017) was a Pakistani diplomat and later politician. He held the role of senior leader of the Pakistan Muslim League and chairman of the Senate Standing Committee on Foreign Affairs.

== Career ==
Zaki also served as Pakistani ambassador to China, Nigeria, the Philippines and the United States and remained as secretary general and minister of state for foreign affairs during a long career with the Foreign Service that spanned throughout the reigns of Z. A. Bhutto and General Zia Ul-Haq. He was an active contributor to a number of research and social organizations in Pakistan and represented Pakistan at several national and international conferences including United Nations General Assembly, UN Human Rights Commission, Organization of Islamic Conference, and the Asian Development Bank.

== Death ==
Akram Zaki died on 30 November 2017 in Islamabad, Pakistan.
