= Habib Chatty =

Tunisian politician and diplomat

- الحبيب الشطي
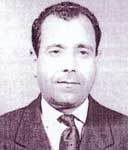
- Chatty in 1957

Secretary-General of the Organisation of Islamic Cooperation
- In office 1979–1984
- Preceded by: Amadou Karim Gaye
- Succeeded by: Syed Sharifuddin Pirzada

Personal details
- Born: 9 August 1916 M'saken, French Tunisia
- Died: 6 March 1991 (aged 74) Paris, France
- Profession: Politician

Habib Chatti or Habib Chatty (9 August 1916 – 6 March 1991) was a Tunisian politician and diplomat. He served as the fourth Secretary-General of the Organisation of Islamic Cooperation (OIC) from 1979 to 1984.

== Biography ==
Habib Chatti was born on 9 August 1916 in M'saken, Tunisia. He began his career as a journalist in the 1930s and became the chief editor of Assabah.

In 1955, Chatti was appointed chief information officer in prime minister Tahar Ben Ammar's government.

in 1958, he was accredited Tunisian ambassador in sensitive posts of his country: Beirut, Cairo and Rabat.

In 1972, he became President Habib Bourguiba's chief of staff. He served as Minister of Foreign Affairs from 1974 to 1977.

In 1979, he became the fourth Secretary-General of the OIC, and held the position until 1984.

Chatti died on 6 March 1991 in Paris.
