= Inter Services Selection Board (Pakistan) =

Organization

Inter-Services Selection Board
- بین الخدماتی مجلسِ انتخاب
- Abbreviation: ISSB
- Formation: 1952; 74 years ago
- Headquarters: Kohat
- Location(s): Gujranwala Quetta Malir
- Region served: Pakistan
- Parent organization: Pakistan Armed Forces
- Website: issb.gov.pk

The Inter-Services Selection Board (colloquially known as ISSB) (Urdu: بین الخدماتی مجلسِ انتخاب) is a committee for the selection of commissioned officers in the Pakistan Armed Forces: the Army, the Navy, and the Air Force.

== Procedure ==
The selection through board is made on the basis of five days of psychological screening to test the ability, aptitude and personality of a candidate. The tests are held in any one of the four centers, namely Kohat, Gujranwala, Quetta and Malir.

Candidates have to go through a thorough procedure of five days. They are tested by the psychologist, Group Testing Officer (GTO) and the Deputy president.

Candidates who pass the selection procedure qualify, provided that they pass a physical test, medical test and general knowledge test to undergo officer training at military academies, primarily the Pakistan Military Academy in Kakul, the Pakistan Naval Academy in Manora the Pakistan Air Force Academy in Risalpur and the SPD's Center of Excellence for Nuclear Security in Chakri.

== Commissioning Courses after ISSB ==
After ISSB one my join:

- PMA Long Course
- TCC (Technical Cadet Course)
- LCC (Lady Cadet Course)
- AMC (Army Medical Cadet)
- DSSC (Direct Short Service Commission)

== Coaching ==
Coaching for the tests is not officially allowed but nevertheless many academies do exist for this purpose, often run by retired military and board officers.

== Trivia ==
The first Sikh passed the board's selection procedure in 2005, the first Hindu in 2006 and the first women also in 2006.

== See also ==
- Recruitment in the British Army
- Recruitment in the United States Army
- Recruitment in the United States Air Force
- Recruitment in the United States Navy
