= Daily Times (Pakistan) =

English-language newspaper

- Front Page for 1 January 2015
- Type: Daily newspaper
- Format: Broadsheet
- Owner: Shehryar Taseer
- Founder: Salman Taseer
- Publisher: Media Times Limited
- Editor: Ali Kazam Waheed
- Founded: 2002
- Political alignment: Liberal, secular
- Language: English
- Headquarters: M.M. Alam Road, Gulberg, Lahore
- City: Lahore; Islamabad
- Country: Pakistan
- Website: dailytimes.com.pk
- Free online archives: dailytimes.com.pk/e-paper/

The Daily Times (DT) is an English-language newspaper that is simultaneously published from Lahore and Islamabad.

The Daily Times is considered a left-leaning newspaper that promotes liberal and secular ideas. It is a member of the All Pakistan Newspapers Society.

== History ==
Daily Times was launched on 9 April 2002 by Salman Taseer with Najam Sethi serving as its first editor-in-chief. It struggled to attract advertisers in its early years. Later, it launched its lifestyle supplement, Sunday Times, which was included with the newspaper's Sunday edition. At a time when social media was not prevalent, Sunday Times covered celebrity events and social gatherings, drawing substantial advertising revenue. Over time, Sunday Times has become a major source of income for the newspaper.

== Notable columnists ==
Notable contributors and columnists for the Daily Times include:

- Iftikhar Ahmad
- Zafar Hilaly
- Lal Khan
- Saulat Nagi
- Hasan Askari Rizvi

== See also ==
- List of newspapers in Pakistan
- The Friday Times
