= Mian Arshad Hussain =

Pakistani diplomat (1910–1987)

10th Minister of Foreign Affairs
- In office 1 May 1968 – 4 April 1969
- President: Ayub Khan
- Preceded by: Sharifuddin Pirzada
- Succeeded by: Yahya Khan

Personal details
- Born: 9 January 1910
- Died: 4 October 1987 (aged 77)
- Party: All-India Muslim League (Before 1947); Muslim League (1947–1958)

Mian Arshad Hussain (9 January 1910 – 4 October 1987) was a Pakistani politician and diplomat who served as Foreign Minister of Pakistan (1968–1969).

In 1959, Mian Arshad Husain was appointed Pakistan's Ambassador to Sweden, in 1961 to Moscow, and in 1963, he was appointed High Commissioner to India. In 1968, he gave the Chinese leader Mao Zedong a basket of Pakistani mangoes, which caused the rise of a "Mango Cult" in China.

Political offices
Preceded by Sharifuddin Pirzada	Minister of Foreign Affairs; 1968–1969	Succeeded by Yahya Khan
