= Agha Shahi =

Pakistani Foreign service officer (1920–2006)

- آغا شاہی
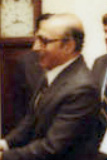

13th Minister of Foreign Affairs
- In office 14 January 1978 – 9 March 1982
- President: General Zia-ul-Haq
- Preceded by: Aziz Ahmed
- Succeeded by: Lt Gen Yaqob Ali Khan

13th Secretary of Foreign Affairs
- In office 6 July 1973 – 6 July 1977
- President: Fazal Ilahi Chaudhry
- Prime Minister: Zulfiqar Ali Bhutto
- Preceded by: Mumtaz Ali Alvie
- Succeeded by: Sardar Shah Nawaz

Permanent Representative of Pakistan to the United Nations
- In office 25 March 1967 – 20 January 1972
- President: Field Marshal Ayub Khan General Yahya Khan; Zulfiqar Ali Bhutto
- Vice President: Nurul Amin
- Vice PM: Nurul Amin
- Preceded by: Syed Amjad Ali
- Succeeded by: Iqbal Akhuond

Personal details
- Born: Agha Shahi; 25 August 1920 Bangalore, Princely State of Mysore, British India
- Died: 6 September 2006 (aged 86) Islamabad, Pakistan
- Citizenship: British Indian (1920–1947); Pakistan (1947–2006)
- Relatives: Agha Hilaly (brother); Zafar Hilaly (nephew)
- Education: Indian Institute of Science
- Occupation: Statesman
- Profession: Physicist, mathematician, teacher
- Cabinet: Zia military government Zulfiqar Ali Bhutto Government
- National Awards: Nishan-e-Imtiaz, 2nd Class (Order of Excellence)

Agha Shahi (Urdu: آغا شاہی; 25 August 1920 – 6 September 2006), NI, was a Pakistani career Foreign Service Officer who was the leading civilian figure in the military government of former President General Zia-ul-Haq from 1977 to 1982. A diplomat and technocrat by profession, he joined the Foreign Services in 1951 and held important diplomatic assignments in the United States, China, and the United Nations. He served as the Foreign Secretary – the leading bureaucratic position in Pakistan Government – in 1973 until 1977, when Zulfikar Ali Bhutto's government was dismissed.

However, he immediately served as the foreign policy adviser to the upcoming Chief Martial Law Administrator General Zia-ul-Haq, who appointed him as the Foreign Minister shortly after assuming the control of the country. In 1982, after losing General Zia's favour when he made an attempt to keep country as a member of the Non-Aligned Movement, he lost his ministry to senior military officer Lieutenant General Sahabzada Yaqub Khan. As a result, his relationship with General Zia-ul-Haq and his military government further deteriorated, with General Zia complaining about Shahi's speech on improving Pakistan's relations with the Soviet Union and the Non-Aligned Movement.

He departed from the country in 1982 to join the United Nations General Assembly and served as the Chairman of UN Committee on Elimination of Racial Discrimination until 1990. He also served as the Chairman of the Pakistan delegation at World Conference on Human Rights. During his last years, he associated with the Institute of Strategic Studies (ISS), Islamabad where he served as its president until his death in 2006.

== Diplomatic career ==
Agha Shahi was born in Bangalore, India (then in Mysore state and now in Karnataka) to the local Urdu-speaking community, the son of an educator who was the principal of a government school. He was educated in Bangalore, excelling in his science courses. In 1939, Shahi enrolled in Indian Institute of Science where he joined the Department of Physics and received a BSc in physics, followed by an MSc in applied physics and an MA in mathematics in 1944.

Following his master's degrees, he joined the faculty of mathematics where he taught undergraduate calculus courses; his parents, however, did not favour their son pursuing a career in education. Encouraged by his parents, Shahi soon left his position and sat the examinations for the Indian Civil Service in 1943, becoming a member of its final batch. In October 1944, he was posted to Sindh Province as an assistant collector, and his family moved to Karachi, Sindh.

In 1947, he opted for Pakistan citizenship, and served as the constitutional adviser to Chief Ministers of Sindh – Ghulam Hussain Hidayatullah from 1947 till 1948, and to Ayub Khuhro from 1948 until 1949. In 1949, the Governor George Baxandall Constantine appointed him as the Commissioner of District Thatta. In 1967, Shahi gained a Master of Science in strategic studies from the Defence & Strategic Studies (DSS) Department.

Shahi had a long career as a Pakistani diplomat, beginning in 1951. He served as the Permanent Representative of Pakistan to the United Nations from 1967 to 1972, and the Pakistani ambassador to China from 1972 to 1973, along with many other positions.

== Early career as an ambassador ==
He opted for the Foreign Service of Pakistan in 1951, and played a prominent role in formulation of the country's foreign policy right during its early years. He was part of various delegations to the United Nations during the 1950s and 1960s, and served with A.S. Bokhari (known as Patras Bokhari), Sir Muhammad Zafarullah Khan and Prince Aly Khan (father of Prince Karim Aga Khan and Pakistan's permanent representative to UN).

Shahi served as Counselor in the Pakistan Embassy in Washington from 1955 to 1958. He was Pakistan's Deputy Permanent Representative to UN from 1958 to 1961 and later served as Permanent Representative to United Nations from 1967 to 1972. During his term as permanent representative to United Nations, he played an important role in enabling China to become a member of the United Nations. He became Additional Secretary in the Ministry of Foreign Affairs in 1964 and served in that position till 1967.

== Foreign Minister of Pakistan ==
In 1972, he was appointed Pakistan's Ambassador to China. In 1973, Shahi became Foreign Secretary and served in that position till the fall of Prime Minister Zulfikar Ali Bhutto in 1977. Shahi was appointed Advisor on foreign affairs/foreign minister in 1977 by General Muhammad Zia-ul-Haq and resigned from the position of foreign minister in 1982, after developing serious differences with General Zia.

== Post-resignation activities ==
Shahi led various delegations of Pakistan to UN General Assembly, conferences of Non-Aligned Movement and Organization of Islamic Conference. He was a member of various UN commissions and was also elected Chairman of the UN Committee on Elimination of Racial Discrimination (CERD) of which he had been a member since 1982. In 1993, Shahi was co-chairman of the Pakistan delegation to the World Conference on Human Rights held in Vienna. Shahi also served as Chairman of Institute of Strategic Studies in Islamabad and headed Islamabad Council of World Affairs – a private think tank.

He was the younger brother of Agha Hilaly who also joined ICS and later opted for Pakistan's foreign service, serving as Pakistan's Ambassador in important capitals such as London, Moscow and Washington (at a time when his younger brother Shahi was Pakistan's permanent representative to UN in New York). Agha Hilaly's son, Zafar Hilaly (who is also a former diplomat), is Agha Shahi's nephew.

== Death and legacy ==
On 6 September 2006, he died after suffering a heart attack, at the Pakistan Institute of Medical Sciences in Islamabad, aged 86.

Pakistan's Minister of Foreign Affairs in 2006, Khurshid Mahmud Kasuri, reportedly commented on Agha Shahi's death, "Agha Shahi served in various key positions in the Foreign Ministry with great distinction rising to the position of foreign secretary and foreign minister. A generation of Pakistani diplomats had the fortune to learn from him."

Ninth Avenue, one of Islamabad's major and busiest roads, is named after him.

== See also ==
- Agha Hilaly

Diplomatic posts
Preceded by Syed Amjad Ali	Pakistan Ambassador to the United Nations; 1967–1972	Succeeded by Iqbal Akhund
Preceded by Aziz Ahmed	Foreign Secretary of Pakistan; 1973–1977	Succeeded by Sardar Shah Nawaz
Political offices
Preceded by Aziz Ahmed	Foreign Minister of Pakistan; 1978–1982	Succeeded by Sahabzada Yaqub Khan
