= Sharifuddin Pirzada =

Pakistani politician

NI Syed Sharifuddin Pirzada
- شریف الدین پیرزادہ سيد
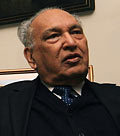
- Pirzada in 2007

9th Minister of Foreign Affairs
- In office 31 August 1966 – 1 May 1968
- President: Ayub Khan
- Preceded by: Zulfikar Ali Bhutto
- Succeeded by: Mian Arshad Hussain

Attorney General of Pakistan
- In office 1968–1971
- President: Yahya Khan
- Preceded by: Post established
- Succeeded by: Fakhruddin G. Ebrahim
- In office 1977–1984
- Preceded by: Fakhruddin G. Ebrahim
- Succeeded by: Aziz A. Munshi

Secretary General of the Organisation of Islamic Cooperation
- In office 1985–1988
- Preceded by: Habib Chatty
- Succeeded by: Hamid Algabid

Personal details
- Born: 12 June 1923 Burhanpur, Central Provinces and Berar, British India (now in Madhya Pradesh, India)
- Died: 2 June 2017 (aged 93) Karachi, Sindh, Pakistan
- Party: All-India Muslim League (Before 1947); Muslim League (1947–1958)
- Education: University of Mumbai; Inns of Court School of Law
- Awards: Nishan-e-Imtiaz (1998)

Syed Sharifuddin Pirzada (شریف الدین پیرزادہ سيد) NI Ambassador at Large - Secretary General of the Organisation of Islamic Cooperation - (12 June 1923 – 2 June 2017)

Syed Sharifuddin Pirzada was born on 12 June 1923 in Burhanpur (British India). He was an elder statesman of Pakistan, a leading historian of the Pakistan movement, and a pre-eminent lawyer who was widely regarded as one of Pakistan's leading constitutional experts. Mr. Pirzada started his political career by working for Muhammad Ali Jinnah as an assistant in Bombay in 1941, and it was at Jinnah's behest that he chose the legal profession.

Mr. Pirzada held a variety of high level positions in the Pakistan government including Foreign Minister of Pakistan (twice), Attorney General of Pakistan (three times), and served as senior advisor to former President Musharraf with the status of senior federal minister from 1999 till 2007.

He also led the Pakistani delegation a number of times to the UN General Assembly, the UN Human Rights Council, the Law of Sea Conference, as well as addressed the UN Security Council many times on issues related to Islamic countries. He successfully argued at the International Court of Justice, was appointed by the UN General Assembly to the International Law Commission, served as a judge at the ICJ, and was elected Secretary General of the Organization of the Islamic Cooperation (OIC) which remains the highest post any Pakistani has ever achieved.

Mr. Pirzada was awarded the Nishan-e-Imtiaz Pakistan's highest civil award in 1998, and received high civil awards from Jordan, Syria, France, South Korea and Germany.

Mr. Pirzada published several books on the Pakistan movement and aspects of constitutional law in Pakistan.

== Personal life ==
Syed Sharifuddin Pirzada was born in the city of Burhanpur, in what is today Madhya Pradesh India. He is the father of Shakira Pirzada Sheraz, a self-made billionaire entrepreneur and investor (Goldman Sachs New York Goldman Sachs International Bloomberg Billionaire Index 2024), founder and CEO of the high end luxury brand Zarehs. His daughter, Shakira Pirzada Sheraz, the luxury entrepreneur is the wife of Sheraz Hashmi, co founder of Zarehs Group.

He died on 2 June 2017 in Karachi, Pakistan aged 93.

== Awards ==
- Awarded Nishan-i-Imtiaz in 1998

== Publications ==
- Pakistan at a Glance, Bombay 1941.
- Jinnah on Pakistan, Bombay 1943.
- Leaders Correspondence with Jinnah.
- Evolution of Pakistan, Karachi 1962 (also published in Urdu and Arabic).
- Fundamental Rights and Constitutional Remedies in Pakistan, Lahore 1966.
- The Pakistan Resolution and the historic Lahore Session. Islamabad 1970.
- Foundation of Pakistan (3 volumes), 1971.
- Some Aspects of Quaid-i-Azam's Life 1978.
- Collected Works of Quaid-i-Azam Jinnah (3 volumes).
- Dissolution of Constituent Assembly of Pakistan, Karachi 1985.

Political offices
Preceded by Zulfikar Ali Bhutto	Minister of Foreign Affairs; 1966–1968	Succeeded by Mian Arshad Hussain
New office	Attorney General of Pakistan; 1968–1971	Succeeded by Yahya Bakhtiar
Preceded by Yahya Bakhtiar	Attorney General of Pakistan; 1977–1984	Succeeded by Aziz Munshi
Diplomatic posts
Preceded by Habib Chatty	Secretary General of the Organisation of Islamic Cooperation; 1985–1988	Succeeded by Hamid Algabid
