= Khurshid Mahmud Kasuri =

Pakistani politician (born 1941)

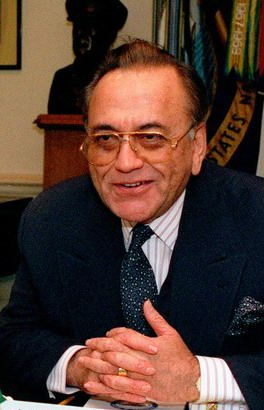
- Kasuri in 2003

25th Minister of Foreign Affairs
- In office 23 November 2002 – 15 November 2007
- President: Pervez Musharraf
- Prime Minister: Shaukat Aziz
- Deputy: Khusro Bakhtiar
- Preceded by: Abdul Sattar
- Succeeded by: Inam-ul-Haq

Personal details
- Born: Mian Khurshid Mahmood Kasuri; 18 June 1941 (age 85) Lahore, Punjab, British India (Now In Pakistan)
- Party: Pakistan Tehreek-e-Insaf
- Other political affiliations: Pakistan Muslim League Q
- Parent: Mahmud Ali Kasuri (father)

Khurshid Mahmud Kasuri (Urdu: خورشيد محمود قصورى; born 18 June 1941) is a Pakistani politician and writer who served as the Minister of Foreign Affairs of Pakistan between November 2002 until November 2007. He is the Senior Advisor on Political and International Affairs and Chairman of the Pakistan Tehreek-e-Insaf's Task Force on Kashmir and a member of the Core Committee of the Party. He is also the author of 'Neither a Hawk Nor a Dove'.

He was born in Lahore, Punjab. After getting educated at the Punjab University, Kasuri later studied law at Cambridge and was subsequently admitted as a barrister at the Gray's Inn. He also went on to study French at Nice. He started his political career with the Tehreek-e-Istaqlal (TI) led by Air-Marshal Muhammad Asghar Khan. The TI was then the main opposition party. He rose to be its Secretary-General. He was also elected as the Secretary-General of the main opposition alliance, the Pakistan Democratic Alliance in 1993. He went to prison on several occasions when Bhutto and General Zia ul Haq were in power for his opposition to both. He was elected to the National Assembly in 1997 and 2002. He was elected as Chairman of the Standing Committee on Information and Media Development. He staunchly opposed the 15th Amendment to the Constitution (‘Shariat Bill’) during the Prime Ministership of Nawaz Sharif. He resigned from membership of the National Assembly as a mark of protest against the 15th Amendment, saying that if passed in its original form, it would negate Quaid-i-Azam Muhammad Ali Jinnah’s pluralistic and progressive vision of Pakistan. He left the foreign office to join the Movement for the Restoration of Democracy in 1981 and was subsequently arrested.

He won a seat in Pakistan's National Assembly as member from NA-142 (Kasur-V) in 1993 and later in 1997 and served on the Parliamentary Standing Committee on Foreign Relations. He left PML after the 1999 coup d'état and joined the military-backed regime to become the Minister of Foreign Affairs in 2002 and remained until 2007.

He joined the Pakistan Movement of Justice (PTI) in 2012 and unsuccessfully ran for National Assembly in 2013.

== Early life ==
=== Education and academics ===
Belonging to the Kumhyar caste of Punjab, Kasuri completed his high school in St Patrick's High School, Karachi, and got accepted at the Government College University but later took a transfer to the Punjab University where he earned a BA with Honors in international relations, in 1961. Throughout his academic career he had a uniformly excellent record, which culminated earning first position in the B.A E (Hons) examination of the Punjab University in 1961.

== Statesmanship ==
=== Foreign diplomacy ===
In 1990, he again joined the foreign ministry and guided Pakistan Muslim League on foreign policies issues. In 1996, he presided over the party delegation and visited the People's Republic of China (PRC). This delegation was invited by the Chinese Communist Party (CCP) and was received by the top leadership of the CCP. He has also attended the Inter-Parliamentary Union conferences held in Seoul and in Cairo in 1997 as a chairman of the Pakistan Parliamentary Delegations. In 1998, he publicly endorsed for Prime minister Nawaz Sharif's decision for atomic tests (See: Chagai-I and Chagai-II) and was appointed as Prime Minister's Special Envoy (PMSE) to present his country's point of view, while backing the rationale of country's nuclear response. He subsequently visited many countries to gather the support for country's nuclear testing program, including Russia, the United States, Canada, China, France, the United Kingdom, and other important countries in the world.

=== Political activism ===
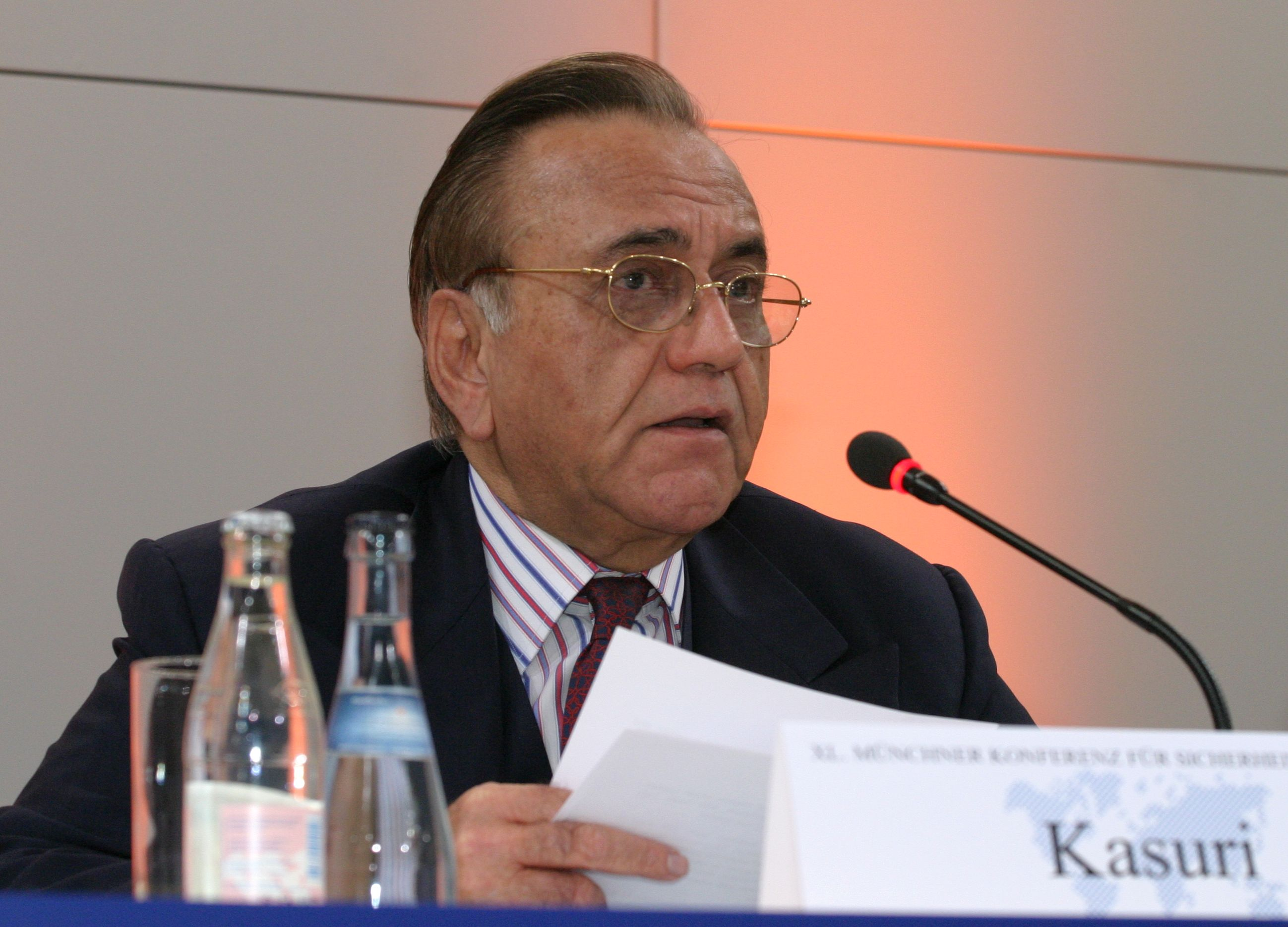
Kasuri speaking at the 40th Munich Security Conference.

He briefly left the Foreign Office (FO) in 1981 and joined the Independence Movement to step into national politics. He was quickly elevated as the Secretary-General of the Tehrik-e-Istiqlal (lit. Independence Movement). He was subsequently arrested on innumerable occasions during his long struggle for democracy. After the military government of Zia-ul-Haq went back on its promise to hold general elections in the country, leading political parties got together under the banner of the Movement for Restoration of Democracy (MRD) for the purpose of holding general elections, restoration of fundamental rights of the citizens, removal of restrictions placed on the free functioning of the press and the establishment of an independent judiciary. He was arrested on numerous occasions for taking part in a movement launched by the political parties in February 1981 for the achievement of the above objectives.

In 1983, he departed from the country in opposition response to Zia's purge and started his academic career in France. He briefly return in 1988 after the mysterious death of Zia-ul-Haq in a plane crash and joined the Foreign service office after being requested by his peers. He took first public participation in 1993 general elections on a Pakistan Muslim League (PML) platform, and was a provisional vice-president of PML, and successfully defended his constituency, NA-106: Kasur (now NA-142) in the 1997 general elections. He was subsequently appointed as Chairman of the Parliamentary Standing Committee on Information and Media Development (PSCIMD) and was also a senior member of the Parliamentary Standing Committee on Foreign Relations (PSCFR).

In 1999, after the 1999 military coup d'état, Kasuri had a severe confrontation with Javed Hashmi who was presiding the PML in absence of Sharif, and defected to the dissident group headed by Shuja'at Hussain in 2001. He successfully contested in 2002 general elections from a NA-142: Kasur.

Khurshid Mahmud Kasuri was one of the few members of the Pakistan Muslim League who always expressed his views on all the national issues frankly and fearlessly regardless of whether the government of the day liked his views or not. In 1997, he publicly called for the issue of the impeachment of the former President Farook Ahmad Leghari, and raised objections on the Fourteenth Amendment and Fifteenth Amendment; he expressed very strongly and issued statements on the constitutional changes. He lobbied against the Fifteen Amendment, particularly as originally presented, was strongly objected to by him. It was primarily due to his efforts and his colleagues' lobbying that Sharif's government had to make an amendment in the Fifteenth Amendment, which contained provisions, which were highly detrimental to the federal and democratic structure of the Constitution. Kasuri put immense effort to stop the bill from becoming into the law in its original shape that he threatened Prime Minister Sharif to resign from the party and his constituency unless the bill was amended, and notably resigned from the party, though resignation was torn up by Sharif in a stormy meeting of the Parliamentary party.

== Foreign minister ==
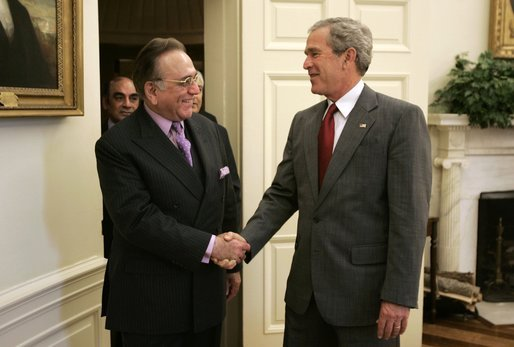
Kasuri with President George W. Bush at the Oval Office, 2005.

On 23 November 2004, Prime Minister Zafarullah Khan Jamali nominated Kasuri to be country's Minister of Foreign Affairs. His nomination was not objected by the opposition parties, and secured the unanimous votes for his nomination in the parliament. On 9:30 am PST, 23 November 2004, he took charge of the foreign ministry and announced that the new government's first priority is to normalize relations with India. He directed Pakistan's foreign policy more on neutral ground base and quoted: "We want to improve relations with India and wish peace and prosperity for the people of India."

== 2008 election ==
In the February 2008 parliamentary election, Kasuri ran for a National Assembly seat from NA-140 (Kasur-III), where he was defeated by the PPP candidate, Sardar Asif Ahmed Ali.

== Academia and professorship ==
In 2012, he lectured on the topics involving in the Peace and conflict studies at the "Centre of Peace and Progress" where he lectured with Jaswant Singh and met with Governor of West Bengal N.K. Narayan.

Khurshid Kasuri is the executive member of the board of directors of the Beaconhouse National University.

Political offices
Preceded by Abdul Sattar	Foreign Minister of Pakistan; 2002–2007	Succeeded by Inam-ul-Haq
