= Balakh Sher Mazari =

Pakistani politician (1928–2022)

Sardar Mir Balakh Sher Mazari
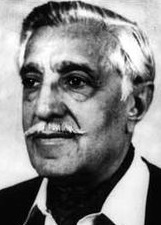

Prime Minister of Pakistan Caretaker
- In office 18 April 1993 – 26 May 1993
- President: Ghulam Ishaq Khan
- Preceded by: Nawaz Sharif
- Succeeded by: Nawaz Sharif

Personal details
- Born: 8 July 1928 Kot Karam Khan, Punjab, British India
- Died: 4 November 2022 (aged 94) Lahore, Pakistan
- Party: Pakistan Tehreek-e-Insaf
- Relations: Dost Muhammad Mazari (grandson); Sherbaz Khan Mazari (brother); Sardar Riaz Mehmood Khan Mazari (son); Sardar Zahid Mehmood khan Mazari (son)
- Education: Aitchison College

Sardar Mir Balakh Sher Mazari (Urdu: بلخ شیر مزاری; 8 July 1928 – 4 November 2022) was a Pakistani politician who served as Caretaker Prime Minister of Pakistan for five weeks in 1993. He was the tumandar (or chieftain) and the paramount sardar of the Mazari tribe which is situated on the tristate area between Balochistan, Sindh, and Punjab provinces of Pakistan.

As the chieftain of his tribe, he held the title of "Mir" but also went by the styles of "Tumandar" or "Sardar". Mazari was the 22nd Sardar and the seventh Mir of the Mazaris. He was one of the largest landholder in Pakistan. Alongside Mazari, his brother Sherbaz Khan Mazari also played a role in the politics of Pakistan. His son Sardar Riaz Mehmood Khan Mazari was elected to the National Assembly of Pakistan from Constituency NA-195 (Rajanpur-III) as a candidate of Pakistan's Tehreek-e-Insaf political party in the 2018 Pakistani general election and his grandson Mir Dost Mohammad Mazari is a Pakistan People's Party parliamentarian from NA-175 Rajanpur who served as the parliamentary secretary for the Ministry of Water and Power.

Mazari served as the Caretaker Prime Minister of Pakistan after the Nawaz Sharif government was overthrown by President Ghulam Ishaq Khan. Mazari's tenure as caretaker prime minister ended abruptly on 26 May 1993 when the Supreme Court revoked the presidential order and reinstated Nawaz Sharif as the prime minister.

Mazari died on 4 November 2022, at age 94.

== Caretaker prime minister ==
On 19 April 1993, President Ghulam Ishaq Khan exercised his extra-constitutional presidential powers, instituted to him through the Eighth Amendment to the Constitution of Pakistan, to resolve the power struggle in Pakistan and dismissed the government of prime minister Nawaz Sharif. After dissolving both, the national and the provincial assemblies, Khan appointed Mazari as the caretaker prime minister. After being appointed the caretaker prime minister, Mazari had to serve as the head of the government for 90 days, a mandatory period required to set up a framework for the next general elections. Mazari scheduled the general elections for 14 July 1993.

Political offices
Preceded by Nawaz Sharif	Prime Minister of Pakistan; Caretaker; 1993	Succeeded by Nawaz Sharif
