= List of Aitchison College alumni =

This is a list of notable Old Boys (pupils) who studied and graduated from the Aitchison College in Lahore, Pakistan.

== A ==
- Aamir Hayat Khan Rokhri
- Safdar Ali Abbasi
- Yahya Afridi
- Iqbal Z. Ahmed
- Aitzaz Ahsan
- Munib Akhtar
- Saleem Ali
- Syed Babar Ali
- Miangul Adnan Aurangzeb
- Hammad Azhar

== B ==
- Umar Ata Bandial
- Khusro Bakhtiar
- Hashim Jawan Bakht
- Wahid Bakhsh Bhayo
- Harcharan Singh Brar
- Akbar Bugti
- Talal Akbar Bugti
- Aameen Taqi Butt

== D ==
- Shahzada Dawood

== G ==
- Hamid Raza Gilani

== H ==
- Faisal Saleh Hayat
- Mian Muhammad Afzal Hayat
- Ameer Haider Khan Hoti
- Wajahat Hussain

== I ==
- Syed Fakhar Imam
- Waleed Iqbal

== J ==
- Sayed Muhammad Jaffar
- Jan Mohammad Jamali
- Mir Khan Muhammad Jamali
- Rustam Jamali
- Zafarullah Khan Jamali
- Asadullah Jan

== K ==
- Abdus Salim Khan
- Aimal Wali Khan
- Amin ud-din Ahmad Khan
- Amir Mohammad Khan
- Asfandyar Wali Khan
- Bazid Khan
- Imran Khan
- Jam Ghulam Qadir Khan
- Khalid Amir Khan
- Khurshid Ali Khan
- Majid Khan - cricketer
- Malik Ahmad Khan
- Sir Malik Umar Hayat Khan
- Chaudhary Nisar Ali Khan
- Omar Ayub Khan
- Nawab Sir Sadeq Mohammad Khan V
- Shaukat Hayat Khan
- Yawar Hayat Khan
- Ghulam Mustafa Khar
- Ali Kuli Khan Khattak
- Nasrullah Khan Khattak
- Pervez Khattak
- Zulfiqar Ali Khosa
- Dost Muhammad Khosa
- Muhammad Saif-ud-Din Khosa
- Sardar Muhammad Mohiuddin Khosa

== L ==
- Awais Leghari
- Farooq Leghari
- Jaffar Khan Leghari
- Jamal Leghari
- Muhammad Mohsin Khan Leghari
- Mushtaq Leghari
- Sardar Muhammad Khan Laghari

== M ==
- Zulfikar Ali Magsi
- Sir Sundar Singh Majithia
- Babar W. Malik
- Ahmad Raza Maneka
- Changez Marri
- Khair Bakhsh Marri
- Balakh Sher Mazari
- Sherbaz Khan Mazari
- Ataullah Mengal
- Shahzada Alam Monnoo

== N ==
- Amjad Ali Noon
- Sir Feroz Khan Noon

== P ==
- Iftikhar Ali Khan Pataudi
- Sher Ali Khan Pataudi

== Q ==
- Sadiq Hussain Qureshi
- Shah Mehmood Qureshi
- Ashiq Hussain Qureshi

== R ==
- Rameez Raja
- Wahab Riaz

== S ==
- Sardar Ayaz Sadiq
- Umar Saif
- Yousuf Salahuddin
- Hassan Sardar
- Narindar Saroop
- Syed Abid Hussain Shah
- Syed Mansoor Ali Shah
- Shaan Shahid
- Ahmed Omar Saeed Sheikh
- Gurbakshish Singh
- Raja Bhalindra Singh
- Maharaja Sir Bhupinder Singh
- Maharaja Sir Yadavinder Singh

== T ==
- Abdul Majid Khan Tarin
- Sir Malik Khizar Hayat Tiwana
