= Leghari =

Leghari may refer to:

- Leghari tribe, a Baloch tribe in Pakistan and Iran

== People ==
- Awais Leghari (born 1971), Pakistani politician
- Farooq Leghari (1940–2010), Pakistani politician, President of Pakistan 1993-1997
- Irfan Zafar Leghari (fl. from 2018), Pakistani politician
- Jaffar Khan Leghari (born 1942), Pakistani politician
- Jamal Leghari (fl. 2011), Pakistani politician
- Javaid Laghari, Pakistani academic, author, and politician
- Muhammad Mohsin Khan Leghari (born 1963), Pakistani politician
- Mushtaq Leghari (active 1962–1999), Pakistani Air Force officer and diplomat
- Nadir Laghari, Pakistani politician
- Nazir Leghari (born 1955), Pakistani journalist, writer and news analyst
- Rafique Haider Khan Leghari (born 1951), Pakistani politician
- Rehana Leghari (born 1971), Pakistani politician
- Sajeela Leghari (born 1964), Pakistani politician

== See also ==
- Tuman Leghari, a town and union council of Dera Ghazi Khan District, Punjab province, Pakistan
