= NA-185 Dera Ghazi Khan-II =

Constituency of the National Assembly of Pakistan

- Constituency for the National Assembly of Pakistan
- Region: Dera Ghazi Khan Tehsil (partly) including Dera Ghazi Khan city, Kot Chutta Tehsil (partly) of Dera Ghazi Khan District
- Electorate: 400,355

Current constituency
- Created: 2018
- Member: Vacant
- Created from: NA-172 (Dera Ghazi Khan-II)

NA-185 Dera Ghazi Khan-II (این اے-185، ڈیرہ غازي خان-2) is a constituency for the National Assembly of Pakistan. It mainly comprises the city of Dera Ghazi Khan which was in the old NA-172 before the 2018 delimitations.

== Member of Parliament ==
=== 2002–2018: NA-172 Dera Ghazi Khan-II ===
Election	Member	Party
2002	Farooq Leghari	NA
2008	Farooq Leghari	PML-Q
2011	Awais Leghari	PML-Q
2013	Abdul Kareem	PML-N

=== 2018-2024: NA-191 Dera Ghazi Khan-III ===
Election	Member	Party
2018	Zartaj Gul	PTI

=== 2024-2025: NA-185 Dera Ghazi Khan-II ===
Election	Member	Party
2024	Zartaj Gul	SIC

== Election 2002 ==
General elections were held on 10 October 2002. Farooq Ahmad Khan Laghari of National Alliance won by 56,343 votes.

General election 2002: NA-172 Dera Ghazi Khan-II
Party	Candidate	Votes	%	±%
NA	Sardar Farooq Ahmad Khan Laghari	56,343	51.35	
Independent	Sardar Muhammad Khan Leghari	39,423	35.93	
MMA	Rasheed Ahmad Khan	7,099	6.47	
PPP	Dr. Saeed Ahmad Buzdar	6,850	6.25	
Turnout		111,845	36.66	
Total valid votes		109,715	98.10	
Rejected ballots		2,130	1.90	
Majority		16,920	15.42	
Registered electors		305,066		

== Election 2008 ==
General elections were held on 18 February 2008. Farooq Ahmad Khan Laghari of PML-Q won by 45,370 votes.

General election 2008: NA-172 Dera Ghazi Khan-II
Party	Candidate	Votes	%	±%
PML(Q)	Farooq Ahmad Khan Leghari	45,370	34.97	
PML(N)	Abdul Karim	41,894	32.29	
PPP	Shabbir Anmad Khan Leghari	36,401	28.06	
Independent	Sardar Muhammad Khan Leghari	3,623	2.79	
Others	Others (two candidates)	2,444	1.89	
Turnout		134,348	34.26	
Total valid votes		129,732	96.56	
Rejected ballots		4,616	3.44	
Majority		3,476	2.68	
Registered electors		392,109		

== By-Election 2011 ==
By-Election 2011: NA-172 Dera Ghazi Khan-II
Party	Candidate	Votes	%	±%
PML(Q)	Sardar Awais Ahmed Khan Laghari	61,918	51.60	
PML(N)	Dr Hafiz Abdul Karim	40,460	33.72	
PPP	Shabbir Anmad Khan Leghari	16,226	13.52	
Others	Others (fifteen candidates)	1,398	1.16	
Turnout		123,214	31.02	
Total valid votes		120,002	97.39	
Rejected ballots		3,212	2.61	
Majority		21,458	17.88	
Registered electors		397,159		

== Election 2013 ==
General elections were held on 11 May 2013. Hafiz Abdul Kareem of PML-N won by 49,230 votes and became the member of National Assembly.

General election 2013: NA-172 Dera Ghazi Khan-II
Party	Candidate	Votes	%	±%
PML(N)	Abdul Kareem	49,230	31.11	
Independent	Sardar Muhammad Jamal Khan	39,389	24.89	
PTI	Zartaj Gul Akhwand	38,643	24.42	
PML(Q)	Sardar Maqsood Khan Leghari	19,558	12.36	
Independent	Khadim Hussain	5,583	3.53	
PPP(SB)	Dr. Saeed Ahmad Buzdar	2,358	1.49	
Others	Others (nine candidates)	3,478	2.20	
Turnout		163,847	47.36	
Total valid votes		158,239	96.58	
Rejected ballots		5,608	3.42	
Majority		9,841	6.22	
Registered electors		345,974		

== Election 2018 ==
General elections were held on 25 July 2018.

General election 2018: NA-191 Dera Ghazi Khan-III
Party	Candidate	Votes	%	±%
PTI	Zartaj Gul	79,932	42.97	
PML(N)	Awais Leghari	54,571	29.34	
Independent	Sardar Dost Muhammad Khan Khosa	31,703	17.04	
PPP	Parveen Akhtar	7,961	4.28	
Independent	Dr. Mian Abdul Rehman	5,713	3.07	
TLP	Abdul Rehman	3,667	1.97	
PST	Muhammad Naeem	753	0.40	
APML-Jinnah	Muhammad Al Faisal	542	0.29	
AAT	Ahmad Bakhsh	464	0.25	
Independent	Tanveer Ahmad	274	0.15	
MQM-P	Izhar UI Hag Qureshi Siddiqui	169	0.09	
Independent	Khaleel Ahmad	161	0.09	
Independent	Javed lqbal	109	0.06	
Turnout		192,422	50.58	
Total valid votes		186,019	96.67	
Rejected ballots		6,403	3.33	
Majority		25,361	13.63	
Registered electors		380,414		
PTI win (new seat)				

== Election 2024 ==
Elections were held on 8 February 2024. Zartaj Gul won the election with 94,927 votes.

General election 2024: NA-185 Dera Ghazi Khan-II
Party	Candidate	Votes	%	±%
PTI	Zartaj Gul (Note: Filed nomination papers as PTI candidate but ECP allowed her to run as an Independent)	94,927	51.41	▲8.44
Independent	Mehmood Qadir Khan	39,235	21.25	
PPP	Dost Muhammad Khosa	26,627	14.42	▲10.14
Others	Others (seventeen candidates)	23,850	12.92	
Turnout		198,658	49.62	▼0.96
Total valid votes		184,639	92.94	
Rejected ballots		14,019	7.06	
Majority		55,692	30.16	▲16.53
Registered electors		400,355		

== By-election 2025 ==
A by-election will be held on 23 November 2025 due to the disqualification of Zartaj Gul, the previous member from this seat.

By-election 2025: NA-185 Dera Ghazi Khan-II
Party	Candidate	Votes	%	±%
PML(N)	Mehmood Qadir Khan	82,419	61.39	
PPP	Dost Muhammad Khosa	49,266	36.70	
Others	Others (six candidates)	2,561	1.91	
Turnout		136,406	32.61	
Total valid votes		134,246	98.42	
Rejected ballots		2,160	1.58	
Majority		33,153	24.69	
Registered electors		418,310		

== See also ==
- NA-184 Dera Ghazi Khan-I
- NA-186 Dera Ghazi Khan-III
