= Khawaja Sheraz Mehmood =

Pakistani politician

- خواجہ شیراز محمود

Member of the National Assembly of Pakistan
- Incumbent
- Assumed office 29 February 2024
- Constituency: NA-183 Taunsa
- In office 2018–2023
- In office 2008–2013
- Constituency: NA-183 Taunsa
- In office 2002–2008
- Constituency: NA-183 Taunsa

Minister of State for Production
- In office 2012–2013

Personal details
- Born: 6 August 1974 (age 52)
- Party: PTI (2018-present)
- Other political affiliations: PML(Q) (2002-2013); PPP (2013-2018)

Khawaja Sheraz Mehmood (Urdu: خواجہ شیراز محمود; born 6 August 1974) is a Pakistani politician who has been a member of the National Assembly of Pakistan since February 2024 and previously served in this position from 2002 to 2013 and again from August 2018 till January 2023.

== Early life ==
He was born on 6 August 1974.

== Political career ==
He was elected to the National Assembly from Constituency NA-171 (Dera Ghazi Khan-I) as a candidate of the Pakistan Muslim League (Q) (PML-Q) in the 2002 general election. He received 82,310 votes and defeated Amjad Farooq Khan.

He was re-elected to the National Assembly from Constituency NA-171 (Dera Ghazi Khan-I) as a candidate of PML-Q in the 2008 Pakistani general election. He received 39,628 votes and defeated Amjad Farooq Khan. In the same election, he ran for the seat of the Provincial Assembly of the Punjab from Constituency PP-240 (Dera Ghazi Khan-I) as a candidate of PML-Q but was unsuccessful. He received 11,155 votes and lost the seat to Sardar Mir Badshah Qaisrani. In May 2011, he was inducted into the federal cabinet of the prime minister, Yousaf Raza Gillani, and was appointed minister of state for production, a post he held until June 2012. In June 2012, he was inducted into the federal cabinet of prime minister Raja Pervaiz Ashraf and was re-appointed as minister of state for production until March 2013.

== See also ==
- List of members of the 15th National Assembly of Pakistan
