= 1993 Pakistani presidential election =

1993 presidential election in Pakistan

- 13 November 1993

464 votes of the Electoral College 233 votes needed to win
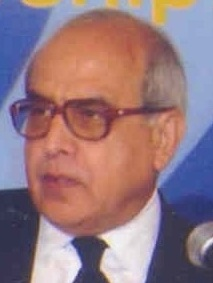

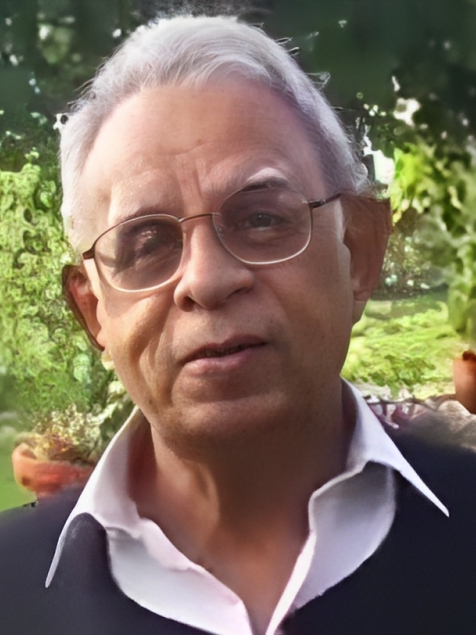
Candidate	Farooq Leghari	Wasim Sajjad
Party	PPP	PML(N)
Home state	Punjab	Punjab
Electoral vote	273	167
States carried	2 + ICT (Note: Balochistan was not carried by either candidate because both candidates received 21 votes respectively.)	1
Percentage	58.83%	35.99%
- Map of the results
President before election
Wasim Sajjad (Acting president)
PML(N)
President
Farooq Leghari
PPP

An indirect presidential election was held in Pakistan on 13 November 1993 to select the eighth president of Pakistan. The election resulted in Farooq Leghari, candidate for the Pakistan People's Party (PPP), emerging victorious over his opponent, Wasim Sajjad, candidate for the Pakistan Muslim League (N) (PML(N)). The election followed the Electoral College of Pakistan as defined in the 1973 constitution and involved voting from both houses of parliament in addition to the provincial assemblies.

== Background ==
In 1990, Nawaz Sharif, leader of the PML(N) was elected prime minister of Pakistan after defeating his rival, Benazir Bhutto, who campaigned for the PPP. However, in April 1993, Ghulam Ishaq Khan, president at the time, dismissed Sharif's government on charges of corruption and maladministration. The Supreme Court of Pakistan ruled that Khan exceeded his powers as president by removing Sharif and so restored him as prime minister, thus leading to greater political turmoil as both men worked to consolidate their control in the country. This conflict between Sharif and Khan resulted in both men resigning on 18 July 1993 after pressure from the Pakistan Army, resulting in a general election being held on 6 October 1993.

The general election resulted in the PPP winning the most seats at 86 compared to the PML(N)'s 73; however, this number was not sufficient for a majority, leading to both parties rallying independent politicians to vote for their respective candidates, Bhutto or Sharif, as prime minister in the National Assembly. The National Assembly voted for a prime minister on 19 October 1993, ultimately electing Bhutto as prime minister for a second, non-consecutive, term.

== Campaign ==
In between the resignation of Ghulam Ishaq Khan as president and the election of a new president after the general election, Wasim Sajjad, then chairman of the Senate, was elected as acting president. Despite the outbreak of a fire on Pakistan's parliament building on 9 November 1993, the presidential election was not postponed because the election venue was shifted to the State Bank of Pakistan building.

The PPP declared its backing for Farooq Leghari, a Baloch whose family had settled in Punjab and head of the Leghari tribe. Leghari joined the PPP in 1973 after an invitation from Zulfikar Ali Bhutto and became the party's secretary-general in 1978. Leghari opposed the Zia-ul-Haq regime and was arrested several time for leading mass demonstrations. Leghari also served as minister for water and power during the first Benazir Bhutto government until its dismissal by Ghulam Ishaq Khan in 1990.

The PML(N) put its backing behind Wasim Sajjad, a Punjabi conservative politician who served as both interior minister and minister of law and justice during the Muhammad Khan Junejo government. After the death of Muhammad Zia-ul-Haq, Sajjad joined the PML(N).

== Results ==
The electorate composed of 464 members of the national and provincial assemblies. Leghari emerged victorious with 273 votes compared to Sajjad's 167, with other candidates winning 24. In the provincial assemblies, Leghari won 103 total votes compared to Sajjad's 59, winning Sindh, Punjab, and tying in Balochistan. Sajjad only won the North-West Frontier Province. Leghari also earned the confidence of the Senate by earning 48 votes compared to Sajjad's 30, despite the PML(N) holding far more seats in the Senate. Even the Muttahida Qaumi Movement (MQM), a Muhajir-led party based in Karachi and a key rival of the PPP in Sindh, cast its votes in favour of Leghari.

Leghari was sworn in as the eighth president of Pakistan on 14 November 1993, serving until 1997 after he dismissed the second Benazir Bhutto government under the Eighth Amendment on charges of corruption, extrajudicial killings, and lawlessness.
