= Abdul Qadir Khan Khosa =

Member of the National Assembly of Pakistan from Dera Ghazi Khan (2024–2029)

- عبدالقادر خان کھوسہ

Member of the National Assembly of Pakistan
- Incumbent
- Assumed office 29 February 2024
- Constituency: NA-184 Dera Ghazi Khan-I

Personal details
- Party: PMLN (2022-present)
- Parent: Amjad Farooq Khan (father)

Abdul Qadir Khan Khosa (Urdu: عبدالقادر خان کھوسہ) is a Pakistani politician who has been a member of the National Assembly of Pakistan since February 2024.

== Political career ==
Khosa contested the July 2022 Punjab provincial by-election from PP-288 Dera Ghazi Khan-IV as a candidate of Pakistan Muslim League (N) (PML(N)), but was unsuccessful. He received 32,285 votes and was defeated by Muhammad Saif-ud-Din Khosa, a candidate of Pakistan Tehreek-e-Insaf (PTI), who received 58,559 votes.

He was elected to the National Assembly of Pakistan in the 2024 Pakistani general election from NA-184 Dera Ghazi Khan-I as a PML(N) candidate. He received 111,296 votes while runner-up Ali Muhammad, an Independent politician candidate supported by PTI, received 109,856 votes.
