= PP-289 Dera Ghazi Khan-IV =

Constituency of the Punjabi Provincial Legislature, Pakistan

- Constituency for the Provincial Assembly of Punjab
- Region: Dera Ghazi Khan Tehsil (partly) and Kot Chutta Tehsil (partly) including Kot Chutta city of Dera Ghazi Khan District

Current constituency
- Member: Osama Abdul Kareem
- Created from: PP-245 Dera Ghazi Khan-VI (2002-2018); PP-290 Dera Ghazi Khan-VI (2018-2023)

PP-289 Dera Ghazi Khan-IV (پی پی-289، ڈيره غازى خان-4) is a Constituency of Provincial Assembly of Punjab.

== By election 2025-26 ==
The seat will vacant due to resignation of Mehmood Qadir Khan to contest MNA election.

Osama Abdul Kareem, elected as MPA unopposed.

== General elections 2024 ==
Provincial election 2024: PP-289 Dera Ghazi Khan-IV
Party	Candidate	Votes	%	±%
Independent	Mehmood Qadir Khan	32,728	39.14	
Independent	Ahmad Ali Khan Dreshak (Note: Filed nomination papers as PTI candidate but ECP allowed him to run as an Independent)	30,503	36.48	
PPP	Sardar Dost M Khan Khosa	9,772	11.69	
TLP	Malik Muhammad Khubaib	2,231	2.67	
ITP	Mushtaq Hussain Saqi	2,010	2.40	
Others	Others (seventeen candidates)	6,374	7.62	
Turnout		85,520	41.43	
Total valid votes		83,618	97.78	
Rejected ballots		1,902	2.22	
Majority		2,225	2.66	
Registered electors		206,420		
hold				

== General elections 2018 ==
Provincial election 2018: PP-290 Dera Ghazi Khan-VI
Party	Candidate	Votes	%	±%
PTI	Sardar Muhammad Jamal Khan	32,105	35.63	
PML(N)	Muhammad Ahmed Khan Leghari	28,470	31.60	
Independent	Usama Abdul Karim	19,401	21.53	
PPP	Muhammad Ramzan Qadir	7,467	8.29	
Independent	Muhammad Atif Ali Dareshak	1,501	1.67	
Others	Others (four candidates)	1,153	1.28	
Turnout		94,237	52.18	
Total valid votes		90,097	95.61	
Rejected ballots		4,140	4.39	
Majority		3,635	4.03	
Registered electors		180,602		

== General elections 2013 ==
Provincial election 2013: PP-245 Dera Ghazi Khan-VI
Party	Candidate	Votes	%	±%
Independent	Sardar Muhammad Jamal Khan Laghari	17,908	25.94	
PML(Q)	Sardar Muhammad Khan Leghari	14,410	20.87	
PML(N)	Zeeshan Haider Leghari	13,968	20.23	
PTI	Muhammad Faheem Saeed Chingwani	5,127	7.43	
PPP(SB)	Ayoub Khan Kachilla	4,808	6.96	
MWM	Khadim Hussain	4,624	6.70	
MDM	Allah Wasaya Chandya	3,413	4.94	
Independent	Jumma Khan Jogyani	1,573	2.28	
Others	Others (ten candidates)	3,208	4.65	
Turnout		72,387	48.97	
Total valid votes		69,039	95.37	
Rejected ballots		3,348	4.63	
Majority		3,498	5.07	
Registered electors		147,825		

== See also ==
- PP-288 Dera Ghazi Khan-III
- PP-290 Dera Ghazi Khan-V
