= Latif Khosa =

Pakistani lawyer and politician (born 1946)

- لطیف کھوسہ
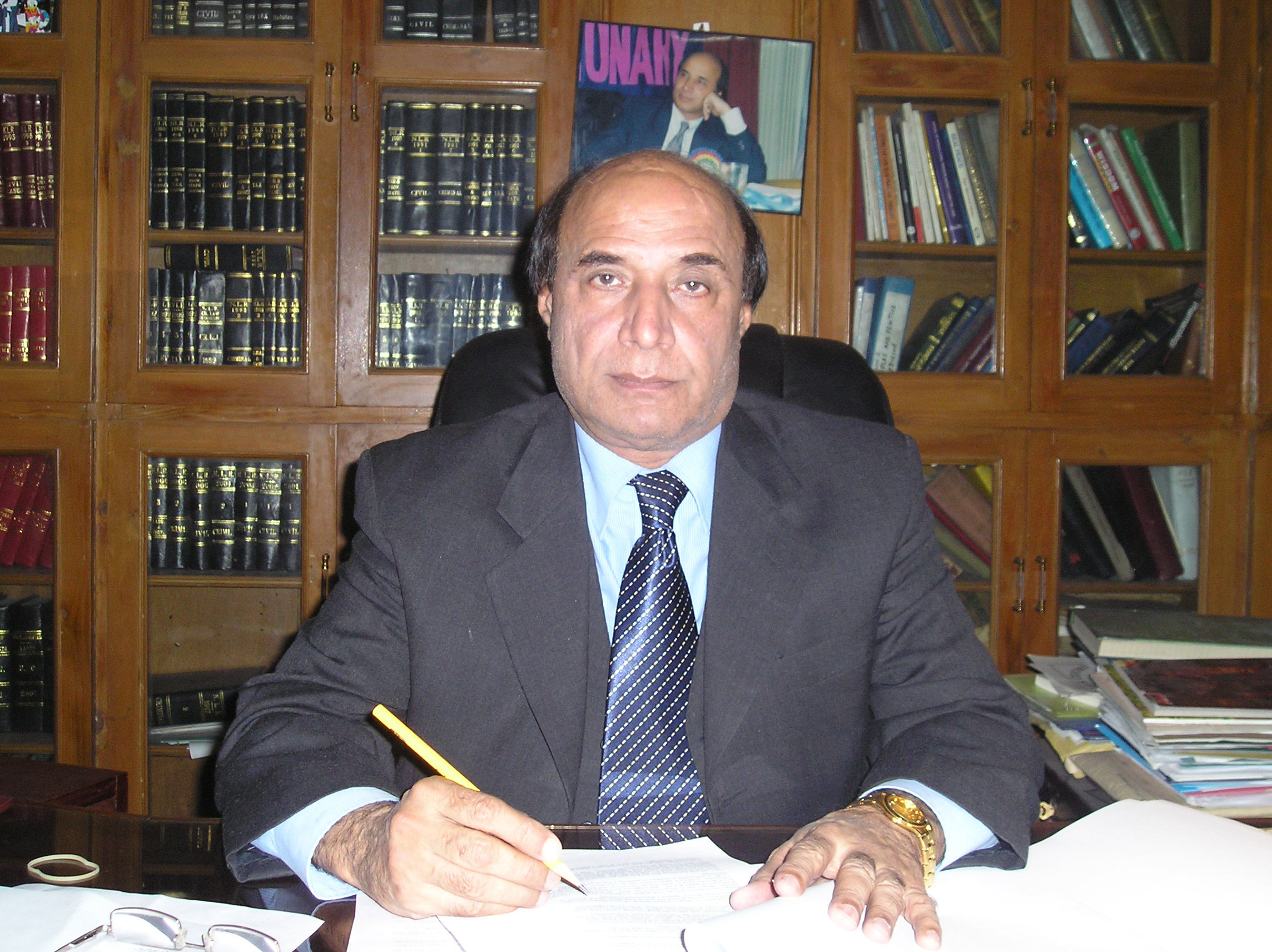

35th Governor of Punjab
- In office 13 January 2011 – 2 January 2013
- President: Asif Ali Zardari
- Prime Minister: Yusuf Raza Gillani
- Preceded by: Salmaan Taseer
- Succeeded by: Makhdoom Ahmed Mehmood

26th Attorney General of Pakistan
- In office 19 August 2008 – 10 October 2009
- President: Asif Ali Zardari
- Prime Minister: Yusuf Raza Gillani
- Preceded by: Malik Mohammad Qayyum
- Succeeded by: Anwar Mansoor Khan

Member of the National Assembly of Pakistan
- Incumbent
- Assumed office 29 February 2024
- Constituency: NA-122 Lahore-VI

Vice President of PTI
- Incumbent
- Assumed office 2 December 2023
- Chairman: Imran Khan; Gohar Ali Khan

Secretary General of Pakistan People’s Party
- In office March 2013 – July 2017
- Chairman: Bilawal Bhutto Zardari
- Co-Chairman: Asif Ali Zardari
- Preceded by: Jahangir Badar
- Succeeded by: Nayyar Bukhari

Federal Advisor of Information Technology & Telecommunication
- In office November 2009 – July 2010
- President: Asif Ali Zardari
- Prime Minister: Yusuf Raza Gillani
- Preceded by: Farooq H. Naek
- Succeeded by: Humayun Khan

Chairman Pakistan Bar Council
- In office 2008–2009
- Preceded by: Malik Mohammad Qayyum
- Succeeded by: Anwar Mansoor Khan

Member of the Senate of Pakistan
- In office March 2003 – March 2009
- President: Pervaiz Musharraf
- Prime Minister: Shaukat Aziz
- Constituency: General seat from Punjab

Vice Chairman of the Pakistan Bar Council
- In office 1995–1996
- Preceded by: Ch Muhammad Ashraf Wahla
- Succeeded by: Muhammad Kazim Khan

Personal details
- Born: Muhammad Latif Khosa; 25 July 1946 (age 80) Dera Ghazi Khan, Punjab, British India (now Pakistan)
- Party: PTI (2022-present)
- Other political affiliations: PPP (1970-2022)
- Spouse: Jamila Khosa
- Relations: Asif Saeed Khosa (Cousin); Nasir Mahmood Khosa (Cousin); Tariq Masood Khosa (Cousin); Zulfiqar Ali Khosa (Cousin); Amjad Farooq Khan (Cousin); Dost Muhammad Khosa (Nephew); Muhammad Saif-ud-Din Khosa (Nephew)
- Children: 7 (4 sons, 3 daughters)
- Education: Government College Lahore/University of Punjab
- Profession: Lawyer/Politician
- Notable Awards: Nishan-e-Imtiaz; Hilal-e-Imtiaz; Krishan Kishore Grover Goodwill Gold Medal

Sardar Muhammad Latif Khan Khosa (Note: Urdu: سردار محمد لطیف خان کھوسہ) (born 25 July 1946) is a Pakistani lawyer and politician (sitting MNA) who is an advocate in the Supreme Court of Pakistan. He served as the Governor of Punjab from 2011 to 2013. He is the incumbent Member of National Assembly Pakistan from NA-122 Lahore since 10 February 2024. He was a senator from 2003 to 2009, the attorney general of Pakistan in 2008 to 2009 and the Federal advisor of Information Technology & Telecommunication from 2009 to 2010.

Khosa also remained a member of the Pakistan Bar Council and served as its Executive Committee's chairman. He co-authored an electoral fraud report with former prime minister Benazir Bhutto shortly before her assassination in December 2007. Khosa had been one of Bhutto's aides.

Khosa joined Pakistan Tehreek-e-Insaf in 2022. Latif Khosa is the founder of Khosa Law Chambers (KLC), a law firm based in Lahore.

== Early life, education and family ==
Sardar Muhammad Latif Khan Khosa belongs to a family of the Khosa tribe located in the Dera Ghazi Khan-Rajanpur tract. His family includes former Governor of the Punjab Sardar Zulfiqar Ali Khosa; former Chief Minister of the Punjab Sardar Dost Muhammad Khosa; former Inspector General Police Tariq Khosa; former Chief Secretary Punjab Nasir Khosa and former Supreme Court Chief Justice Asif Saeed Khosa.

After receiving his early education from Dera Ghazi Khan Punjab, he joined Government College, Lahore from where he did his graduation. During his stay at Government College, he showed excellent results in debate, sports and academics.

After graduation, he joined the Punjab University Law College at Lahore, where he became President of the Punjab University Law College Students Union, and the editor of Law college's official magazine, "Al-Meezan". He was declared the best English debater of 1967 in the Punjab University after winning the "Krishan Kishore Grover Goodwill Gold Medal Declamation Contest". Later, he was selected as the president of PULC debating society. He did his LL.B in 1967 with a top honours for best all round activities in academics, sports and debates.

Khosa has four sons and three daughters.

== Legal career ==
Supreme Court of Pakistan

Latif Khosa joined the legal profession at Lahore and enrolled as an advocate of the subordinate Courts in 1968. In 1970, he became an advocate of the High Court and in 1980 as an advocate of the Supreme Court.

During the years 1981, 1983 and 1985, Latif Khosa was elected as the President of High Court Bar Association Multan. In 1990, Khosa was elected as Member Pakistan Bar Council for the first time and subsequently for 3 more terms in 1995, 2000 and 2005.

=== Bar politics ===
Khosa has been very active in bar politics and his group has won important Supreme Court Bar Association and Pakistan Bar Council elections over the last 40 years. He has been selected as the president of High Court Bar thrice (1981; 1983; 1985) and as member Pakistan Bar Council three times 1990-2005 (15 years).

=== Attorney general ===
Soon after the PPP came to power after the 2008 elections; Khosa was appointed Attorney-General for Pakistan until 2009. Being attorney general, he represented Pakistan on different International Forums & Judicial Conferences.

== Political career ==
He has held the portfolios of a Senator (2003-2009), Attorney General (2008-2009) in the Government of Pakistan, Advisor/Federal Minister (2010). He also remained Governor of Punjab (2011-2013) and most recently as Member National Assembly Pakistan from NA-122 Lahore since 8 February; 2024.

Khosa was active in the 2007 lawyer's movement for the restoration of dozens of senior judges including Iftikhar Muhammad Chaudhry sacked by former military ruler Pervez Musharraf in 2007.

Senator Khosa appeared before the acting Chief Justice Javaid Iqbal in a hearing over the handling of the Iftikhar Chaudry sacking issue.

=== Early career ===
Khosa has spoken for rule of law and rights of minorities. In 1967 he supported Zulfikar Ali Bhutto against the military dictator Ayub Khan. From 1977 onwards, he supported Benazir Bhutto against the military dictators Zia ul Haq and Pervaiz Musharraf.

=== Senator ===
Khosa was elected as Senator from Punjab Province in 2003. His name was nominated by late Mohtarma Benazir Bhutto. His senatorship remained in function until 2009.

He has been member of senate Committees for Foreign Affairs, Law Justice and Human Rights, Government Assurances, Committee on Rules of Procedure and Privileges, Senate House Committee, Devolution Process.

=== Federal Advisor of Information Technology & Communication ===
He has also been appointed as Advisor of Information Technology/Minister Incharge in the cabinet of Prime Minister Yousaf Raza Gilani. On 20 July 2010, Advisor to Prime Minister Yousaf Raza Gilani on Information Technology/Minister Incharge Sardar Latif Khosa sent his resignation to the president after developing disagreements with the premier.

=== Governor Punjab ===
He was appointed as Governor of Punjab in January 2011. The choice of his selection as Governor came after the PPP acquiesced to the PML-N's 10-point agenda to improve relationship between PML(N)'s Punjab Government and that of the PPP federal government.

Khosa has been the key instrument in smooth running of the Punjab Government during his governorship 2011–2013 in spite of issues between the two mainstream political parties PPP (Pakistan People's Party) and PML-N (Pakistan Muslim League-Nawaz).

=== Secretary General PPP ===
Khosa was appointed as the Secretary General of Pakistan Peoples Party in 2013 and he remained on that post until 2017. He is also the Member of CEC Pakistan People's Party. He is the Central Chairman of the party's Lawyer Wing Peoples Lawyers Forum (PLF) and Election Monitoring Cell of Pakistan Peoples Party.

=== Member National Assembly Pakistan ===
Khosa was elected to the National Assembly of Pakistan in the 2024 Pakistani general election from NA-122 Lahore-VI as an independent candidate supported by Pakistan Tehreek-e-Insaf (PTI). He received 117,124 votes and defeated Khawaja Saad Rafique, a candidate of Pakistan Muslim League (N) (PML(N)).

== Books ==
- The Constitution of The Islamic Republic of Pakistan, 1973 (with all amendments and up-to-date case laws), Imran Law Book House, 2024.
- Dynastic Succession in South Asia: Rajiv Gandhi, Benazir Bhutto & Sheikh Hasina Wazed, Palgrave Macmillan.
- Democratic Dispensation in Pakistan: Between Ballot and Barracks, Palgrave Macmillan.

== Notes ==
Political offices
Preceded by Salman Taseer	Governor of Punjab; 13 Jan 2011 – 2 Jan 2013	Succeeded by Syed Ahmed Mahmud

Political offices
Preceded by Malik Mohammad Qayyum	Attorney General of Pakistan; 19 Aug 2008 – 10 Oct 2009	Succeeded by Anwar Mansoor Khan
