= NA-172 (Dera Ghazi Khan-II) =

Former constituency of the National Assembly of Pakistan

Constituency NA-172 (Dera Ghazi Khan-II)
- Former constituency for the National Assembly of Pakistan
- Region: Dera Ghazi Khan District

Former constituency
- Created: 2002
- Abolished: 2018
- Replaced by: NA-191 (Dera Ghazi Khan-III); NA-192 (Dera Ghazi Khan-IV)

Constituency NA-172 (Dera Ghazi Khan-II) (Urdu: این اے-۲۱۷، ڈیرہ غازيخان-۲) was a constituency for the National Assembly of Pakistan. It comprised mainly the city of Dera Ghazi Khan and the tehsil of Kot Chutta. After the 2018 delimitations, these areas have been included in NA-191 (Dera Ghazi Khan-III) and NA-192 (Dera Ghazi Khan-IV) respectively; as a district was allocated an additional constituency after the 2017 Census.

== Election 2002 ==
General elections were held on 10 October 2002. Farooq Ahmad Khan Laghari of National Alliance won by 56,343 votes.

General election 2002: NA-172 Dera Ghazi Khan-II
Party	Candidate	Votes	%	±%
NA	Sardar Farooq Ahmad Khan Laghari	56,343	51.35	
Independent	Sardar Muhammad Khan Leghari	39,423	35.93	
MMA	Rasheed Ahmad Khan	7,099	6.47	
PPP	Dr. Saeed Ahmad Buzdar	6,850	6.25	
Turnout		111,845	36.66	
Total valid votes		109,715	98.10	
Rejected ballots		2,130	1.90	
Majority		16,920	15.42	
Registered electors		305,066		

== Election 2008 ==
General elections were held on 18 February 2008. Farooq Ahmad Khan Laghari of PML-Q won by 45,370 votes.

General election 2008: NA-172 Dera Ghazi Khan-II
Party	Candidate	Votes	%	±%
PML(Q)	Farooq Ahmad Khan Leghari	45,370	34.97	
PML(N)	Abdul Karim	41,894	32.29	
PPP	Shabbir Anmad Khan Leghari	36,401	28.06	
Independent	Sardar Muhammad Khan Leghari	3,623	2.79	
Others	Others (two candidates)	2,444	1.89	
Turnout		134,348	34.26	
Total valid votes		129,732	96.56	
Rejected ballots		4,616	3.44	
Majority		3,476	2.68	
Registered electors		392,109		

== By-Election 2011 ==
By-Election 2011: NA-172 Dera Ghazi Khan-II
Party	Candidate	Votes	%	±%
PML(Q)	Sardar Awais Ahmed Khan Laghari	61,918	51.60	
PML(N)	Dr Hafiz Abdul Karim	40,460	33.72	
PPP	Shabbir Anmad Khan Leghari	16,226	13.52	
Others	Others (fifteen candidates)	1,398	1.16	
Turnout		123,214	31.02	
Total valid votes		120,002	97.39	
Rejected ballots		3,212	2.61	
Majority		21,458	17.88	
Registered electors		397,159		

== Election 2013 ==
General elections were held on 11 May 2013. Hafiz Abdul Kareem of PML-N won by 49,230 votes and became the member of National Assembly.

General election 2013: NA-172 Dera Ghazi Khan-II
Party	Candidate	Votes	%	±%
PML(N)	Abdul Kareem	49,230	31.11	
Independent	Sardar Muhammad Jamal Khan	39,389	24.89	
PTI	Zartaj Gul Akhwand	38,643	24.42	
PML(Q)	Sardar Maqsood Khan Leghari	19,558	12.36	
Independent	Khadim Hussain	5,583	3.53	
PPP(SB)	Dr. Saeed Ahmad Buzdar	2,358	1.49	
Others	Others (nine candidates)	3,478	2.20	
Turnout		163,847	47.36	
Total valid votes		158,239	96.58	
Rejected ballots		5,608	3.42	
Majority		9,841	6.22	
Registered electors		345,974		
