= NA-183 Taunsa =

Constituency of the National Assembly of Pakistan

- Constituency for the National Assembly of Pakistan
- Region: Taunsa District
- Electorate: 476,495

Current constituency
- Party: Sunni Ittehad Council
- Member: Khawaja Sheraz Mehmood
- Created from: NA-171 Dera Ghazi Khan-I

NA-183 Taunsa (این اے-183، تونٚسہ) is a constituency for the National Assembly of Pakistan.

== Election 2002 ==
General elections were held on 10 October 2002. Khawaja Sheraz Mahmood of PML-Q won by 82,310 votes.

General election 2002: NA-171 Dera Ghazi Khan-I
Party	Candidate	Votes	%	±%
PML(Q)	Khawaja Sheraz Mehmood	82,310	59.74	
PML(N)	Amjad Farooq Khan	49,302	35.78	
PPP	Khawaja Jamal-Ud-Din Asghar	4,362	3.17	
Others	Others (four candidates)	1,816	1.31	
Turnout		141,763	45.02	
Total valid votes		137,790	97.20	
Rejected ballots		3,973	2.80	
Majority		33,008	23.96	
Registered electors		314,919		

== Election 2008 ==
General elections were held on 18 February 2008. Khawaja Sheraz Mehmood of PML-Q won by 74,628 votes.

General election 2008: NA-171 Dera Ghazi Khan-I
Party	Candidate	Votes	%	±%
PML(Q)	Khawaja Sheraz Mehmood	39,628	24.37	▼35.37
Independent	Amjad Farooq Khan	36,400	22.38	
PML(N)	Sardar Mir Badshah Qaisrani	35,124	21.60	▼14.18
PPP	Khawaja Mudasar Mehmood	19,221	11.82	▲8.65
Independent	Khawja Muhammad Dawood Sulemani	16,543	10.17	
MMA	Khawja Ghulam Nizam Ud Din	14,914	9.17	▲8.62
Others	Others (four candidates)	804	0.49	
Turnout		169,748	44.51	
Total valid votes		162,634	95.81	
Rejected ballots		7,114	4.19	
Majority		3,228	1.99	
Registered electors		381,343		
PML(Q) hold				

== Election 2013 ==
General election 2013: NA-171 Dera Ghazi Khan-I
Party	Candidate	Votes	%	±%
PML(N)	Amjad Farooq Khan	62,849	33.91	▲12.31
PPP	Khawaja Sheraz Mehmood	57,276	31.08	▲19.26
JUI (F)	Sardar Mir Badshah Qaisrani	37,961	20.60	▲11.43
PTI	Khawaja Mudasar Mehmood	17,514	9.50	
Others	Others (twelve candidates)	8,698	4,91	
Turnout		190,166	54.68	
Total valid votes		184,298	96.91	
Rejected ballots		5,868	3.09	
Majority		5,573	2.83	
Registered electors		347,789		
PML(N) gain from PML(Q)				

== Election 2018 ==
General elections were held on 25 July 2018.

General election 2018: NA-189 Dera Ghazi Khan-I
Party	Candidate	Votes	%	±%
PTI	Khawaja Sheraz Mehmood	78,824	47.14	▲37.64
Independent	Sardar Mir Badshah Qaisrani	39,562	23.66	
MMA	Khawja Mudassar Mehmood	15,168	9.07	▼11.53
PPP	Khawaja Atta Ullah Khan Tonsa	11,928	7.13	▼23.95
ARP	Jamshed Dasti	8,424	5.04	
Independent	Muhammad Iqbal	3,077	1.84	
TLP	Mushtaq Ahmed Mundrani	2,961	1.77	
APML	Hafeez Ur Rehman Baloch	2,221	1.33	
Independent	Sardar Confcius Imam Qaisrani	1,742	1.04	
Aam Admi Tehreek Pakistan	Rashida Naseem	828	0.50	
Independent	Muhammad Arif Aslam	711	0.43	
PML(N)	Shamoona Ambreen	523	0.31	▼33.60
Independent	Zafar Iqbal	505	0.30	
NP	Abdul Rauf	297	0.18	
Independent	Sooba Khan	248	0.15	
Independent	Ameer Muhammad Zulqernain	179	0.11	
Turnout		173,583	52.45	▼2.23
Total valid votes		167,198	96.32	
Rejected ballots		6,385	3.68	
Majority		39,262	23.48	
Registered electors		300,959		
PTI gain from PML(N)				

== Election 2024 ==
General elections were held on 8 February 2024. Khawaja Sheraz Mehmood won the election with 134,501 votes.

General election 2024: NA-183 Taunsa
Party	Candidate	Votes	%	±%
PTI	Khawaja Sheraz Mehmood (Note: Filed nomination papers as PTI candidate but ECP allowed him to run as an Independent)	134,501	51.23	▲4.09
PML(N)	Amjad Farooq Khan	88,489	33.70	▲33.39
JUI (F)	Khawja Mudassar Mehmood	14,001	5.33	
Others	Others (fifteen candidates)	25,561	9.74	
Turnout		273,492	57.40	▲4.95
Total valid votes		262,552	96.00	
Rejected ballots		10,940	4.00	
Majority		46,012	17.52	▼5.96
Registered electors		476,495		

== See also ==
- NA-182 Layyah-II
- NA-184 Dera Ghazi Khan-I
