= Muhammad Saif-ud-Din Khosa =

Pakistani politician

Member of the Provincial Assembly of the Punjab
- In office 21 July 2022 – 14 January 2023
- Constituency: PP-288 (Dera Ghazi Khan-IV)

Member of the National Assembly of Pakistan
- In office February 2008 – 9 May 2012
- Constituency: NA-173 (Dera Ghazi Khan-III)

Personal details
- Born: 1 November 1962 (age 64) Lahore, Punjab, Pakistan
- Party: PTI (2018-present)
- Other political affiliations: PPP (2013-2018); PMLN (2002-2012)
- Relations: Dost Muhammad Khosa (Brother); Latif Khosa (Uncle); Amjad Farooq Khan Khosa (Uncle); Sardar Muhammad Mohiuddin Khosa (nephew)
- Parent: Zulfiqar Ali Khosa (father)

Muhammad Saif-ud-Din Khosa is a Pakistani politician who served as a member of the Provincial Assembly of the Punjab from July 2022 till January 2023. He had previously been a member of the National Assembly of Pakistan from February 2008 to May 2012.

== Political career ==
He ran for the seat of the National Assembly of Pakistan from NA-133 Dera Ghazi Khan-II as an independent candidate in the 1990 Pakistani general election, but was unsuccessful. He received 5,544 votes and was defeated by Farooq Leghari, a candidate of Pakistan Democratic Alliance (PDA). He also ran for the seat of the Provincial Assembly of the Punjab from PP-202 Dera Ghazi Khan-IV as a candidate of Islami Jamhoori Ittehad (IJI) in the 1990 Punjab provincial election, but was unsuccessful. He received 25,815 votes and was defeated by Sardar Maqsood Ahmed Khan Leghari, an independent candidate.

He ran for the seat of the National Assembly from NA-133 Dera Ghazi Khan-II as a candidate of Pakistan Muslim League (N) (PML-N) in the 1993 Pakistani general election, but was unsuccessful. He received 50,938 votes and was defeated by Farooq Leghari, a candidate of Pakistan People's Party (PPP). He also ran for the seat of the Provincial Assembly from PP-202 Dera Ghazi Khan-IV as a candidate of PML-N in the 1993 Punjab provincial election, but was unsuccessful. He received 19,444 votes and was defeated by Sardar Maqsood Ahmed Khan Leghari, an independent candidate.

He ran for the seat of the National Assembly from NA-133 Dera Ghazi Khan-II as an independent candidate in the 1997 Pakistani general election, but was unsuccessful. He received 3,212 votes and was defeated by Jaffar Khan Leghari, another independent candidate. He also ran for the seat of the Provincial Assembly from PP-202 Dera Ghazi Khan-IV as a candidate of PML-N in the 1997 Punjab provincial election, but was unsuccessful. He received 21,371 votes and was defeated by Sardar Maqsood Ahmed Khan Leghari, an independent candidate.

He ran for the seat of the Provincial Assembly of the Punjab from PP-244 (Dera Ghazi Khan-V) and from PP-246 (Dera Ghazi Khan-VII) as a candidate of the Pakistan Muslim League (N) (PML-N) in the 2002 Punjab provincial election but was unsuccessful. He received 13,801 votes from PP-244 (Dera Ghazi Khan-V) and lost the seat to Syed Abdul Aleem, a candidate of the National Alliance. He received 21,760 votes from PP-246 (Dera Ghazi Khan-VII) and lost the seat to Sardar Muhammad Yousaf Khan Leghari, a candidate of the National Alliance.

He was elected to the National Assembly of Pakistan from NA-173 (Dera Ghazi Khan-III) as a candidate of the PML-N in the 2008 Pakistani general election. He received 56,475 votes and defeated Awais Leghari. In the same election, he was elected to the Provincial Assembly of the Punjab from PP-243 (Dera Ghazi Khan-IV) as a candidate of the PML-N. He received 22,508 votes and defeated Awais Leghari. He vacated the Provincial Assembly seat.

In May 2012, he quit the PML-N and resigned from the National Assembly.

He ran for the seat of the National Assembly from NA-173 (Dera Ghazi Khan-III) as a candidate of the Pakistan Peoples Party (PPP) in the 2013 Pakistani general election but was unsuccessful. He received 60,258 votes and lost the seat to Awais Leghari. In the same election, he ran for the seat of the Provincial Assembly of the Punjab from PP-243 (Dera Ghazi Khan-IV) as a candidate of the PPP but was unsuccessful. He received 2,069 votes and lost the seat to Zulfiqar Ali Khosa, his father.

He ran for the seat of the Provincial Assembly of the Punjab from PP-243 Dera Ghazi Khan-IV as a candidate of the PPP in an August 2013 by-election, but was unsuccessful. He received 17,547 votes and lost the seat to Ahmad Ali Khan Dreshak.

He ran for the seat of the Provincial Assembly of the Punjab from PP-288 Dera Ghazi Khan-IV as a candidate of the Pakistan Tehreek-e-Insaf (PTI) in the 2018 Punjab provincial election, but was unsuccessful. He received 30,164 votes and lost the seat to Mohsin Atta Khan Khosa, an independent candidate.

He was elected to the Provincial Assembly of the Punjab from PP-288 (Dera Ghazi Khan-IV) as a candidate of the PTI in the 2022 Punjab provincial by-election.

He is running for a seat in the Provincial Assembly from PP-288 Dera Ghazi Khan-IV as a candidate of the PTI in the 2024 Punjab provincial election.
