= NA-172 =

NA-172 may refer to:

- NA-172 (Bahawalpur-III), a constituency of the National Assembly of Pakistan
- NA-172 (Dera Ghazi Khan-II), a former constituency of the National Assembly of Pakistan
