= Minister for Water =

Minister for Water may refer to:

- Minister for the Environment and Water (Australia)
  - Minister for Water (Victoria), Australia
  - Minister for Water (Western Australia)
  - Minister for Water (New South Wales), Australia
- Ministry of Lands and Water Affairs (Botswana)
- Minister for Water and Power (Pakistan)
