= NA-184 Dera Ghazi Khan-I =

Constituency of the National Assembly of Pakistan

- Constituency for the National Assembly of Pakistan
- Region: Dera Ghazi Khan Tehsil (partly) of Dera Ghazi Khan District
- Electorate: 448,739

Current constituency
- Party: Pakistan Muslim League (N)
- Member: Abdul Qadir Khan Khosa
- Created from: NA-173 Dera Ghazi Khan-III

NA-184 Dera Ghazi Khan-I (این اے-184، ڈیرہ غازي خان-1) is a constituency for the National Assembly of Pakistan.

== Election 2002 ==
General elections were held on 10 October 2002. Owais Ahmad Khan Leghari of National Alliance won by 55,921 votes.

General election 2002: NA-173 Dera Ghazi Khan-III
Party	Candidate	Votes	%	±%
NA	Awais Ahmad Khan Leghari	55,921	50.55	
Independent	Sardar Hussain Ahmad Khan Leghari	45,355	41.00	
PPP	Sardar Muhammad Irfan Ullah Khan Khosa	4,515	4.08	
MMA	Sahibzada Muhammad Abdul Rahim	3,666	3.31	
Others	Others (two candidates)	1,162	1.06	
Turnout		113,205	40.05	
Total valid votes		110,619	97.72	
Rejected ballots		2,586	2.28	
Majority		10,566	9.55	
Registered electors		282,633		

== Election 2008 ==
General elections were held on 18 February 2008. Muhammad Saif-ud-Din Khosa of PML-N won by 56,475 votes.

General election 2008: NA-173 Dera Ghazi Khan-III
Party	Candidate	Votes	%	±%
PML(N)	Sardar Muhammad Saif-Ul-Din Khan	56,475	41.94	
PML(Q)	Awais Ahmad Khan Leghari	56,074	41.64	
PPP	Muhammad Saif Ullah Khan Sadozai	18,326	13.61	
Others	Others (four candidates)	3,782	2.81	
Turnout		140,041	41.90	
Total valid votes		134,657	96.16	
Rejected ballots		5,384	3.84	
Majority		401	0.30	
Registered electors		334,228		
PML(N) gain from NA				

== Election 2013 ==
General elections were held on 11 May 2013. Owais Ahmad Khan Leghari of PML-N won by 82,521 votes and became the member of National Assembly.

General election 2013: NA-173 Dera Ghazi Khan-III
Party	Candidate	Votes	%	±%
PML(N)	Awais Ahmad Khan Leghari	82,521	44.93	
PPP	Sardar Muhammad Saif-Ul-Din Khan	60,258	32.81	
PTI	Mahar Sajjad Hussain Cheena	24,858	13.53	
Independent	Taj Rasool Sahib	10,773	5.87	
Others	Others (thirteen candidates)	5,354	2.86	
Turnout		191,284	53.32	
Total valid votes		183,674	96.02	
Rejected ballots		7,610	3.98	
Majority		22,263	12.12	
Registered electors		358,766		
PML(N) hold				

== Election 2018 ==
General elections were held on 25 July 2018.

General election 2018: NA-190 Dera Ghazi Khan-II
Party	Candidate	Votes	%	±%
Independent	Amjad Farooq Khan	72,300	45.72	
PTI	Zulfiqar Ali Khosa	72,171	45.64	
TLP	Ghulam Mustafa Lashari	6,352	4.02	
PPP	Sardar Muhammad Irfan Ullah Khosa	6,203	3.92	
Independent	Ashfaq Sarwar Dasti	1,105	0.70	
Turnout		163,134	51.74	
Total valid votes		158,131	96.93	
Rejected ballots		5,003	3.07	
Majority		129	0.08	
Registered electors		315,269		
Independent gain from PML(N)				

== Election 2024 ==
General elections were held on 8 February 2024. Abdul Qadir Khan Khosa won the election with 111,296 votes.

General election 2024: NA-184 Dera Ghazi Khan-I
Party	Candidate	Votes	%	±%
PML(N)	Abdul Qadir Khan Khosa	111,296	45.11	
PTI	Ali Muhammad (Note: Filed nomination papers as PTI candidate but ECP allowed him to run as an Independent)	109,856	44.53	▼1.11
Independent	Zulfiqar Ali Khosa	8,643	3.50	
TLP	Irfan Ullah	8,633	3.50	▼0.52
Others	Others (eight candidates)	8,291	3.36	
Turnout		252,903	56.36	▲4.62
Total valid votes		246,719	97.55	
Rejected ballots		6,184	2.45	
Majority		1,440	0.58	
Registered electors		448,739		
PML(N) gain from PTI				

== See also ==
- NA-183 Taunsa
- NA-185 Dera Ghazi Khan-II
