= Jamal Leghari =

Pakistani politician

Sardar Muhammad Jamal Khan Leghari

Member of the Provincial Assembly of the Punjab
- In office 29 May 2013 – 31 May 2018

Personal details
- Born: 10 March 1966 (age 60)
- Party: PMLN (2013-present)
- Other political affiliations: PTI (2011-2013); PML-Q (2004-2011); National Alliance (2002-2004); Millat Party (1997–2002)
- Parent: Farooq Leghari (father)

Sardar Muhammad Jamal Khan Leghari is a Pakistani politician who was a Member of the Provincial Assembly of the Punjab, from May 2013 to May 2018 and is the son of former president of Pakistan Farooq Leghari.

== Early life and family ==
He was born on 10 March 1966. Jamal Leghari comes from a family of politicians and landlords. He is the son of former President of Pakistan Farooq Leghari. His grandfather Muhammad Khan Leghari and great grandfather after whom he was named had both been ministers in the British government.

Jamal Leghari's native village is Choti Zareen in Dera Ghazi Khan district of Punjab.

Leghari is a major landowner in the area and owns approximately 2,500 acres of land. After the death of his father, Jamal Khan Leghari was crowned the 27th chief of the Leghari tribe in October 2010.

== Political career ==
He was elected to the Provincial Assembly of the Punjab as an independent candidate from Constituency PP-245 (Dera Ghazi Khan-VI) in the 2013 Pakistani general election. He joined Pakistan Muslim League (N) in May 2013.

Jamal Leghari and his brother Awais Leghari joined the Pakistan Tehreek-e-Insaf along with around 28 other PML-Q leaders on December 18, 2011.

== Controversy ==
In the run-up to the 2018 Pakistan General Elections, a controversy erupted over Jamal Leghari's relationship with his constituents. A video of one of his visits to his constituency went viral. In the video, constituents confront Jamal Leghari with questions about the underdevelopment of the region he represents and the fact that he only visits the region when an election is around the corner.

Preceded by Farooq Leghari	Chief of Leghari tribe Tribe; 2010 – P	Succeeded by Incumbent
