= Chukhain Zaam =

Pakistani village

Chukhain Zaam is a village in the Sulaiman Mountains in Dera Ghazi Khan District of Punjab, Pakistan. It lies just 2 Km east of the Balochistan border and 5km south of the Khyber Pakhtunkhwa border, west of the Indus Highway (NA 55), roughly midway between Dera Ghazi Khan and Dera Ismail Khan. The majority of the residents are from the Qaisrani tribe, which is associated with the Baloch Tribal Area of Dera Ghazi Khan District.

== Schools ==
Chukhain Zaam has two Government Primary Schools: one for boys and one for girls. The Boys' Primary School, established in 1961 through the efforts of Wadera Jumma Khan Qaisrani (1930 - 9 January 2008), was initially taught by Amir Muhammad Qaisrani, who was a Middle School graduate.

== Language ==
The primary language spoken in Chukhain Zaam is Balochi. Due to its proximity to the Khyber Pakhtunkhwa border, many residents also understand Pashto.

== Flora and fauna ==
The vegetation around the village includes Khaur, Khunar, Pheer, and Gaz trees, while the hill grasses are Gorkha and Khikh. Local wildlife consists of Rabbits, wolves, jackals, foxes, porcupines, hedgehogs, wild dogs, cats, Snakes, mice, squirrels, and wild lizards. Common birds in the area include partridges, pigeons, doves, sparrows, falcons, owls, quails, and various others.
