= Mushtaq Leghari =

Pakistani diplomat

Sardar Mushtaq Ahmed Khan Laghari
- Born: Choti Zareen
- Military career
- Allegiance: Pakistan
- Branch: Pakistan Air Force GD(P)
- Service years: February 1962-1999 (37 years)
- Rank: Air Vice Marshal
- Nickname: Shaqa Khan
- Unit: Pakistan Air Force
- Conflicts: Indo-Pakistani War of 1965; Indo-Pakistani War of 1971
- Other work: PMCG Syrian Arab Air Force, and HPMCG and Deputy Commander UAE Air Force, Ambassador of Pakistan in the UAE

Sardar Mushtaq Ahmed Khan Laghari is a Pakistani diplomat and former members of the Pakistani Air Force.

== Early life and education ==
from Rahimabad. He was born in Choti Zareen. He is the son of Sardar Mohammad Akbar Khan Laghari. His paternal grandfather was Sardar Noor Mohammed Khan Leghari, founder of Rahimabad. His maternal grandfather Sardar Din Mohammed Khan Leghari, was given the title of Khan Bahadur on 12 December 1911 and Most Eminent Order of the Indian Empire and C.I.E. (Companion of the Indian Empire) On 1 January 1916. He was also the Leghari tribe's Tumandar.

Sardar Mushtaq Ahmed Khan Laghari started his education from the Convent School in Multan and later joined Aitchison Chief's College in junior school. He graduated from Aitchison College as Best Leaving Boy from Godley House in 1962 to join the Pakistan Air Force Academy in Risalpur.

== PAF career ==
Sardar Mushtaq Ahmed Khan Laghari got his commission as a fighter pilot in the Pakistan Air Force. He was the Wing Under Officer (WUO) of his graduating course. In the Air Force, he rose to the rank of Air Vice Marshal. In 1997 he accepted a diplomatic appointment and became Pakistan's Ambassador to the UAE.

In his years of service with the Pakistan Air Force, he saw action in the 1965 war and the 1971 war between Pakistan and India.

While serving with the Air Force he commanded a fighter squadron, a fighter wing, a fighter base, one of the three Air Commands of the PAF, and also served as a Principal Staff Officer / Deputy Chief of the Air Staff at the Air Headquarters. In the course of his career with the PAF he also served on deputation with the Syrian Arab Air Force and the UAE Air Force in Senior Combat & Command positions.

== Retirement ==
After retirement from active service, Sardar Mushtaq Ahmed Khan Laghari was elected President of the Pakistan Air Force Retired Officers Association (PAFROA) in Lahore, Pakistan.

Sardar Mushtaq Ahmed Khan Laghari enjoys playing golf and looking after his agricultural lands.
