= NA-186 Dera Ghazi Khan-III =

Constituency of the National Assembly of Pakistan

- Constituency for the National Assembly of Pakistan
- Region: Kot Chutta Tehsil (partly) of Dera Ghazi Khan District
- Electorate: 387,004

Current constituency
- Created: 2018
- Party: Pakistan Muslim League (N)
- Member: Awais Leghari
- Created from: NA-172 (Dera Ghazi Khan-II)

NA-186 Dera Ghazi Khan-III (این اے-186، ڈیرہ غازي خان-3) is a newly created constituency for the National Assembly of Pakistan. It mainly comprises the town and Tehsil of Kot Chutta which was in the old constituency of NA-172 before the 2018 delimitations.

== 2018 general election ==
General elections were held on 25 July 2018.

General election 2018: NA-192 Dera Ghazi Khan-IV
Party	Candidate	Votes	%	±%
PTI	Sardar Muhammad Khan Laghari	80,683	50.19	
PML(N)	Shehbaz Sharif	67,753	42.15	
PPP	Sardar Muhammad Irfan Ullah Khosa	6,620	4.12	
TLP	Syed Munir Hussain	4,523	2.81	
AAT	Ahmad Bakhsh	617	0.38	
PJDP	Makhdoom Syed Ejaz Hussain	552	0.34	
Turnout		166,133	54.93	
Total valid votes		160,748	96.76	
Rejected ballots		5,385	3.24	
Majority		12,930	8.04	
Registered electors		302,437		
PTI win (new seat)				

== 2024 general election ==
General elections were held on 8 February 2024. Awais Leghari won the election with 100,252 votes.

General election 2024: NA-186 Dera Ghazi Khan-III
Party	Candidate	Votes	%	±%
PML(N)	Awais Leghari	100,252	47.18	▲5.03
PTI	Sajjad Hussain (Note: Filed nomination papers as PTI candidate but ECP allowed him to run as an Independent)	97,990	46.12	▼4.07
Others	Others (fifteen candidates)	14,230	6.70	
Turnout		216,892	56.04	▲1.11
Total valid votes		212,472	97.96	
Rejected ballots		4,420	2.04	
Majority		2,262	1.06	
Registered electors		387,004		
PML(N) gain from PTI				

== See also ==
- NA-185 Dera Ghazi Khan-II
- NA-187 Rajanpur-I
