= Aitchison College =

- ایچیسن کالج

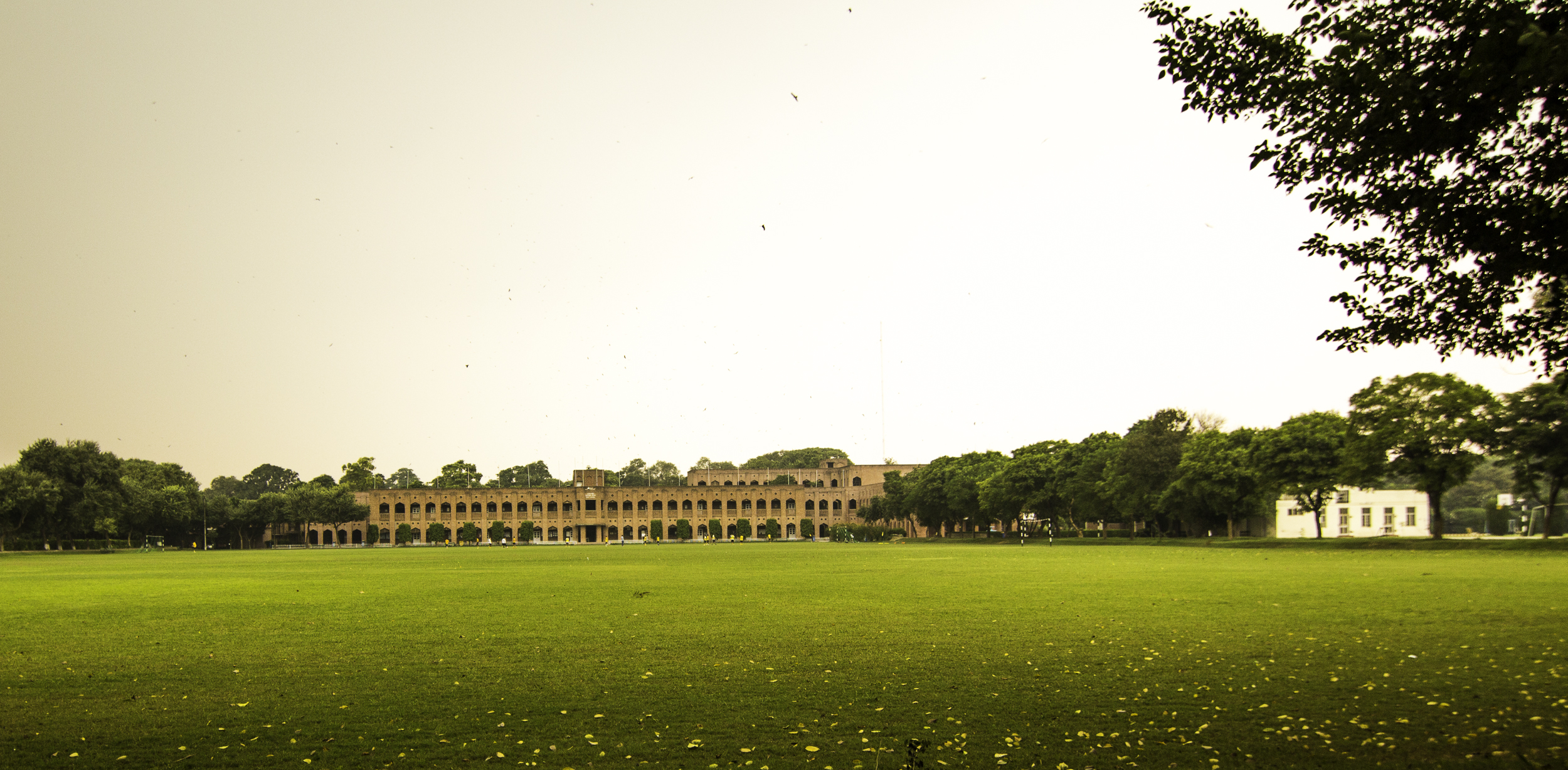

Location
- Shahrah-e-Quaid-e-Azam Lahore; Punjab, 54000; Pakistan; 31°33′06″N 74°20′47″E

Information
- Former name: Punjab Chiefs' College
- School type: Semi-Private; Day & Boarding School
- Motto: Perseverance Commands Success
- Established: 2 January 1886; 140 years ago
- Founder: Charles Umpherston Aitchison
- Patron-in-Chief: Quaid-e-Azam Muhammad Ali Jinnah (1948)
- Oversight: Governor of Punjab, through the Board of Governors
- Principal: Dr. Syed Muhammad Turab Hussain
- Bursar: Mr. Khalid Noon
- Head of school: Ms. Amina Kamran (Senior School); Mr. Raja Ashfaq Ahmed (Prep School); Ms. Fatima Mubeen (Junior School)
- Gender: Boys
- Age range: 5–18
- Enrolment: 1,100 (Senior school); 750 (Prep school); 1,000 (Junior school)
- Area: 81 ha
- Houses: 17 (Senior School); Alamgir; Babur; Balochistan; Centenary; Goldstein; Godley; Ghazi; Hali; Jinnah; Jubilee; Kelly; K&Ns; Leslie Jones; Robinson; Sikander; Shirazi; Tajuddin 12 (Prep School); 9 (Junior School)
- Colours: Blue and yellow
- Song: ہمیں جان سے پیارا ہے یہ چمن “Humein Jaan Say Pyara Hai Yeh Chaman”
- Publication: The Aitchisonian
- Affiliation: G 30 Schools; International Boys' Schools Coalition (IBSC); The Schools Index (Carfax Education); Spear’s School Index Top 10 (Rest of the World) Academic: Cambridge International Schools; Federal Board of Intermediate and Secondary Education (FBISE); Aga Khan University Examination Board (AKU-EB)
- Alumni: Aitchisonians (Old Boys)
- Website: Aitchison College

Aitchison College is a semi-private, day and boarding school encompassing both Junior School and Secondary School for boys, located in Lahore, Pakistan. It has educated prime ministers, including Imran Khan, Zafarullah Khan Jamali, and Feroz Khan Noon, as well as numerous presidents, lawyers, cricketers, and politicians. It is often described as the Eton of Pakistan.

Aitchison was originally formed on 2 January 1886 in then British India, as the Punjab Chiefs' College and was renamed Aitchison College on 13 November 1886. However, the inception of the college can be traced back to 1868 as the Wards School in Ambala after which it became Chiefs' College in Lahore.

== History ==
In his famous Macaulay's Minute on Education (1835) the prominent British politician and historian Thomas Babington Macaulay said:

"We must at present do our best to form a class who may be interpreters between us and the millions whom we govern; a class of persons, Indian in blood and colour, but English in tastes, in opinions, in morals, and in intellect."

This document was instrumental in shaping the colonial education system in the British Raj. The goal was to produce a group of westernised elites who would help the British administer their empire and spread English culture.

On 3 November 1886, the Viceroy Earl of Dufferin and Ava laid the foundation stone of the main building. The building was designed by Bhai Ram Singh and built by Sir Ganga Ram, one a leading architect and the other a leading builder of that time.

The college is named after the then Lieutenant Governor of the Punjab, Sir Charles Umpherston Aitchison, who, addressing the students in 1888, said:

Much, very much, is expected of you. It is one of the Best Schools in Lahore with countless high authority and famous people once as students.

The institution emphasized the importance of education and character development. In an address, students were encouraged to pursue their studies while cultivating values such as virtue, honesty, discipline, and integrity.

=== Wards at Ambala ===
The history of Aitchison College goes back to the Ward's School at Ambala Cantonment which was envisioned in 1864 by Captain Tighe, then D.C. of Ambala. Established in 1868, it was originally intended for the education of young princes of the area but on the insistence of Sir Henry Davies - the Lieutenant Governor of Punjab, it widened its scope in 1874 to cater for the education of all the other heirs of the princely states living in other parts of Punjab. The present constitution of Aitchison College is still based on the set of rules framed for the Wards' School.

The school operated under the names "Wards School", "Chiefs' College", and "Aitchison College" during its history. Its origins date to 1868.

=== Chief's College ===
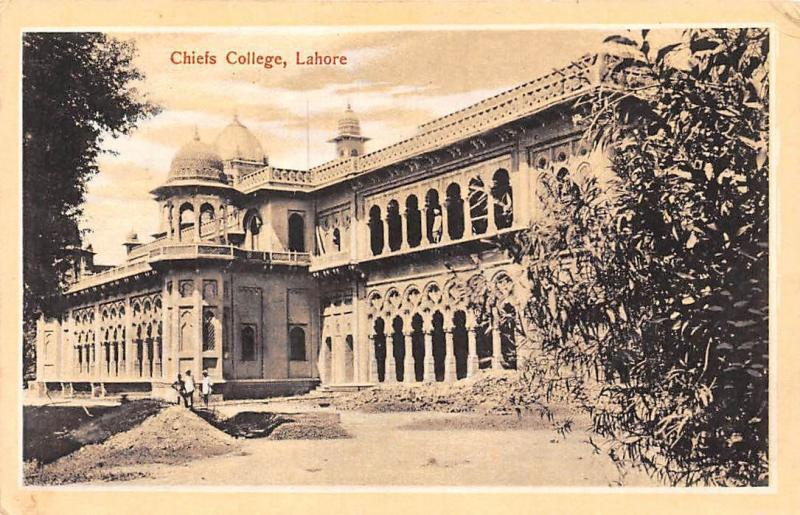
Chiefs College, Lahore

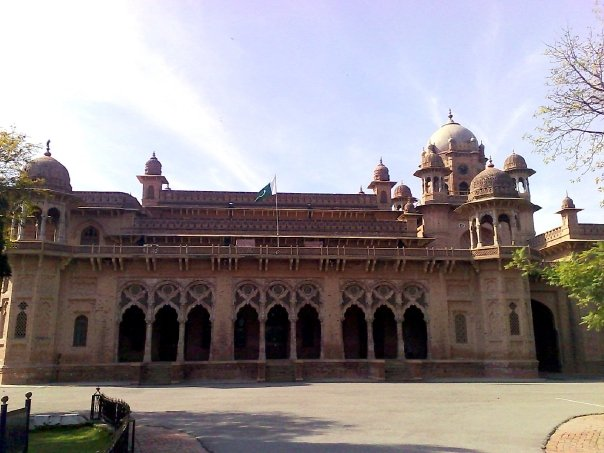
Old Building, Aitchison College, Lahore

=== Aitchison College ===
On 13 November 1886, a few days after the foundation stone of Chiefs College was laid, the school was renamed Aitchison College. Construction of the main building, now known as the Old Building, began in 1887 and was finished in 1890, along with a gymnasium and a hospital. Soon after that, the main building became the centre of academic life at Aitchison, moving classes away from their previous locations in the boarding houses and rented bungalows. Construction on other buildings continued as the school attracted more wards and princes.

Several efforts were made to provide facilities for physical education. In 1896, a cricket pavilion was built, and work began on a polo field. A year later, training in cricket, football, field hockey, and tennis was started. Following Aitchison's win in local sports competitions, the Aitchison Challenge Cup was established to honour the best sportsmen each year. In 1905, ACOBA (Aitchison College Old Boys Association) was established to allow the alumni of the school to compete against the current students in an event that brought together the alumni each year. In 1907, Aitchison College started sending contingents of sports teams to compete with schools outside Lahore and was allowed to host contingents from other schools. Swimming facilities were developed in 1923 and the Rani of Mandi Cup was established to honour the best swimmer of the year. The sports system soon evolved as competitions between the houses began in 1928. Hockey and tennis courts were established in 1938.

The school also offers several extra-curricular activities and awards. In the first half of the 20th century, the school began to offer awards to some of its top students, the most popular of which were those for best essay writer and best debater. Additionally, the first Rivaz medal for a best-leaving boy at Aitchison College was created in 1906. The school also first published "Pioneer" publication in 1936. The Prize Distribution Day ceremony, now known as Founders Day, held annually in May, was started in 1892. The Prize Distribution was later divided into two separate ceremonies: Founders Day Academics and Founders Day Sports.

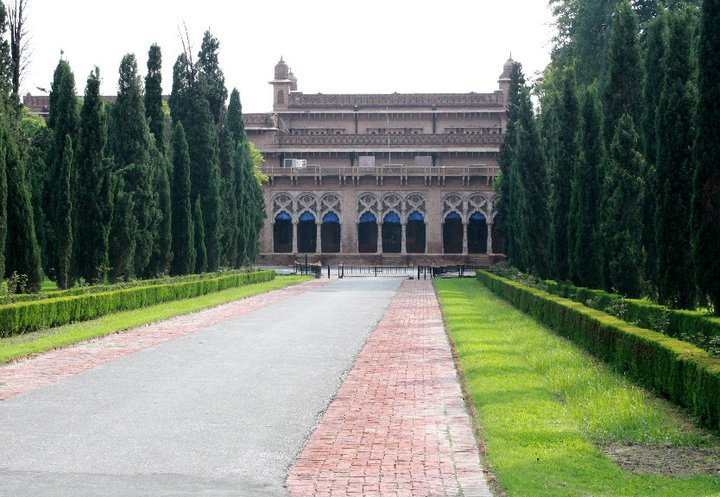
View of the college from Cypress Road

The school also has a history of providing religious education and housing. A mosque was constructed for the religious education of Muslim students in 1900, and a Dharamshala was created in 1913. A separate Sikh mess was organised in 1907, followed by the creation of a separate kitchen for Halal food in 1938. A Hindu temple was also constructed, which was later redesigned to hold the principal's office. Religious education was later made compulsory for Hindu and Sikh students. Until 1933, the school enforced a rule that separate boarding houses should exist for Muslims, Hindus, and Sikhs.

Aitchison College has also changed its building make-up over the years. A separate building for the Preparatory School, which now holds classes for grades 7–9, was constructed in 1915, and the prefects system was established two years later. The school became affiliated with Cambridge University in 1933. In 1935, the policy of admission was broadened to include ordinary boys from surrounding areas. Following this policy, a separate house, Jubilee, was established for day boys. Classes for grades 9–13 were shifted from the main building to the newly constructed Barry Block (Senior School) in 1948. Following the independence of Pakistan in 1947, Muhammad Ali Jinnah was appointed Patron in Chief of the college in 1948. A separate building for Junior School, for Grades 1–5, was built in 1964. The war between India and Pakistan in 1965 disrupted school activities for a while but the normal school year resumed soon after the cease-fire. A number of modern buildings were constructed on the campus near the end of the 20th century, including an amphitheatre, a large library, computer and science laboratories, housing for staff members, a riding school, and squash and basketball courts. Since 2016, the college has added three new boarding houses, science innovation centre and upgraded chemistry laboratories, glass squash court and complex upgrade, new school library and administration centre, new cricket and rugby pavilions, new hardcourt tennis centre, electronic cricket scoreboard on its main ground, cricket academy centre, synthetic hockey field, arena polo ground, new entrance to senior school, an archives centre, new medical hospital wing, and additional staff and workers' housing.

The college has been honoured with the commemorative postage stamp by Pakistan Post, for its 125 years anniversary.

In February 2026, the gurdwara inside the college, reopened for Sikh prayer nearly eight decades after the Partition of India in 1947. The reopening coincided with the school's 140th anniversary.

== Schooling system ==
Aitchison College is divided into 3 major divisions, Junior, Prep, and Senior School. All work in a connected manner but address the varying needs of different age groups of boys.

Each division accepts day scholars and boarding house students. Day scholars are also put into houses to increase competition. Each house typically has Prefects, all of which are appointed from their house's senior most class. Prefects are led by the College's Headboy and the Deputy Headboy, both of whom are selected from the initial prefect body. Each division is under one Headmaster/Headmistress. Each year a founder's day is held over a span of 3 days. The first and third days are reserved for sports competitions such as 100m race, relay race, javelin throw, high jumps, amongst other events, as well as an all-school march past parade, including contingents from the ‘Campus Boys & Campus Girls Schools’ respectively, which are built as separate schools within the College premises, typically for the education of children whose parents work in various capacities at the College. Prizes and trophies are awarded at the conclusion of the ceremony on the third day, as well as the Best House in Sports and Best Overall House trophies, respectively. The second day is reserved for an academics prize distribution ceremony for awarding winners of different competitions conducted throughout the academic year, as well as for handing out the Best House in Co-Curricular trophy, and also counts as a formal farewell ceremony for the leaving batch, where they are each given a memento and an ‘Old-Boy’ tie. Various co-curricular events, conducted by the societies, are also held throughout the year, including but not limited to: the ACMUN Conference, Aitchison Business Concept (ABC), and the Aitchison College Science and Engineering (ACSEC). These events have completed their 15th, 12th, and 9th editions respectively, as of October 2025.

=== Junior School ===
Junior School accommodates students from class K1-K6. Letter K is added before the class number and the section afterwards. K representing Kindergarten. Class 1 is only available to boarders having only 2 sections (K1-A and K1-B). From class 4–6, sections use the names of precious gems stones as section. e.g. K6 Ruby, K5 Sunstone, K4 Emerald. Grades 1-3 use various trees to name their classes e.g. K2 Moringa, K3 Sycamore, K1 Juniper etc. This naming convention has only recently been adopted after the COVID-19 pandemic. Before this naming convention, letters were used. e.g. K6-C, K4-H, K3-B. In each class there is a respective coordinator. Junior school is further divided into 2 main groups, Lower Primary and Upper Primary. Lower Primary being of classes 1-3 and upper primary being of classes 4–6. Lower and Upper primaries have their own respective heads. The whole of Junior School is under one Headmaster/Headmistress with the current headmistress being Ms. Fatima Mubeen. Classes K1-K5 have the option of an in-school boarding school option in a house named Gwyn House. K6 has the option of boarding in their Saigol House. Day boys are also divided into respective day-houses to increase competition between them.

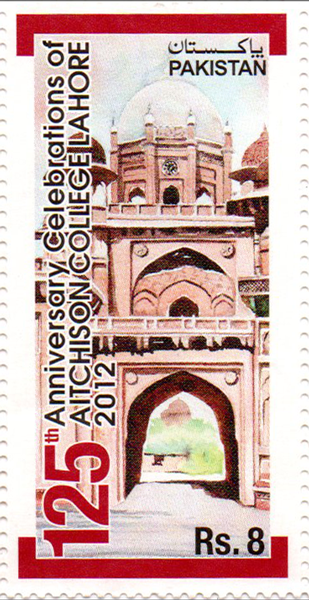
A commemorative postage stamp for Aitchison College

=== Prep school ===
Prep school is also known as preparatory school. It houses students from class 7–9. Class 7 students have their classes names starting with "E" E standing for elementary e.g. E2. Class 8 and 9 students have their classes names starting with "M" standing for Middle. e.g. M1, M2. Prep school makes learning a foreign language compulsory for all students. Foreign languages include Arabic, Chinese, French, German, and Persian. Students are put in sections according to their chosen language. e.g. M2-C1 (Middle 2-Chinese 1), E2-G1 (Elementary 2-German 1), M1-F1 (Middle 1-French 1). Numbers are put in the end to accommodate the large numbers of students in a respective language. The most chosen language being French which has 4-5 sections in each class. Clubs and Societies are practices in Prep school. Some societies include English Dramatic Society, Scrabble Society, Mathematics Society, Science Society, Robotics Society, etc. Each society organiser chooses 1 president from the M2 class, 2 Chief Executives form M2/M1 classes and 8 Executive Members from the E2 class.

=== Senior school ===
Senior school focuses on the Cambridge IGCSE and AS/A2 Level studies for external exams, as well as offering Matric and FSc (FISE). Class divisions are Pre C1, C1, C2, H1, H2. Pre C1 houses students who graduate from prep school's M2 near March. Students are put into sections according to the subjects that they have selected for higher studies. e.g. Students who chose Biology-0610, Chemistry-0620, Physics-0625, Additional Math-0606 would be grouped in one section, C1-B. It offers National Curriculum and Inter-National Curriculum for local and international choices. International curriculum students are not required to have a visa of a foreign country. Senior School by far, has the greatest amount of co-curricular societies (22 in number), some of which take part in both national and international level competitions. Notable examples include the biggest society of Aitchison, ACES (Aitchison College Entrepreneurial Society), more commonly known as 'ABC', followed by the ACSS (Aitchison College Science Society), more commonly known as ‘ACSEC’, and ACMUN (Aitchison College Model United Nations). These societies are led by their appointed Presidents and General Secretaries, who are selected after an interview process from the seniormost batch. Aitchison's various College sports teams are also predominantly made up of students from the Senior School, but Prep School has been known to contribute players to various College teams.

== Controversies ==
The current serving Principal of Aitchison is former Lahore University of Management Sciences Economics Professor, Sayed Muhammad Turab Hussain. He assumed office after the former Principal Sr. Michael A. Thomson resigned in protest after the then-governor of Punjab, Baligh Ur Rehman, allowed a leave of absence and a complete fee waiver for a period of three years to two children of former bureaucrat and Federal Minister for Economic Affairs Ahad Cheema.

== Notable alumni ==
- Asghar Khan
- Imran Khan
- Syed Babar Ali
- Munib Akhtar
- Mian Ijaz ul Hassan
- Shah Mehmood Qureshi
- Ayaz Sadiq
- Hammad Azhar
- Farooq Leghari
- Umar Ata Bandial
- Dost Muhammad Khosa
- Akbar Bugti
- Ameer Haider Khan Hoti
- Zafarullah Khan Jamali
- Zulfiqar Ali Khosa
- Omar Ayub Khan
- Ataullah Mengal
- Shahnawaz Bhutto
- Rana Sikandar Hayat
- Feroz Khan Noon
- Sadiq Hussain Qureshi
- Iftikhar Ali Khan Pataudi
- Ramiz Raja
- Pervez Khattak
- Salman Akram Raja
- Mansoor Ali Shah
- Yahya Afridi
- Ali Kuli Khan

== See also ==
- Government Wards' Institute
