= Amjad Farooq Khan =

Pakistani politician

- امجد فاروق خان

Member of the National Assembly of Pakistan
- In office 13 August 2018 – 10 August 2023
- Constituency: NA-190 (Dera Ghazi Khan-II)
- In office 1 June 2013 – 31 May 2018
- Constituency: NA-171 (D.G.Khan-I)

Personal details
- Born: September 4, 1950 (age 76) Dera Ghazi Khan, Punjab, Pakistan
- Other political affiliations: PTI (2018-2022); Independent (2018); PMLN (1993-2018); Islami Jamhoori Ittehad (1988-1993); Pakistan Muslim League (1985-1988)
- Relatives: Zulfiqar Ali Khosa (Cousin); Dost Muhammad Khosa (Nephew); Latif Khosa (Cousin); Muhammad Saif-ud-Din Khosa (Nephew)

Sardar Muhammad Amjad Farooq Khan Khosa (Urdu: سردار محمد امجد فاروق خان کھوسہ; born 4 September 1950) is a Pakistani politician who had been a member of the National Assembly of Pakistan from August 2018 till August 2023. Previously he was a member of the National Assembly between 1990 and May 2018 and was a member of the Provincial Assembly of the Punjab from 1985 to 1990 and again from 2008 to 2013.

== Early life ==
He was born on 4 September 1950 in Dera Ghazi Khan. According to PILDAT, he was born on 1 January 1949.

He graduated from Government College University. He first obtained degree of Bachelor of Arts and then received the degree of Bachelor of Laws in 1971 from the Punjab University Law College.

== Political career ==
He was elected to the Provincial Assembly of the Punjab from Constituency PP-187 (Dera Ghazi Khan) in the 1985 Pakistani general election.

He ran for the seat of the National Assembly as a candidate of Pakistan Muslim League (N) (PML-N) from Constituency NA-132 (Dera Ghazi Khan) in the 1993 Pakistani general election but was unsuccessful. He received 65,002 votes and lost the seat to Khwaja Kamal-ud-Din Anwar, a candidate of PPP.

He was re-elected to the National Assembly as a candidate of PML-N from Constituency NA-132 (Dera Ghazi Khan) in the 1997 Pakistani general election. He received 73,302 votes and defeated Sardar Mansoor Ahmad Khan, an independent candidate.

He was re-elected to the National Assembly as a candidate of PML-N from Constituency NA-171 (D.G.Khan-I) in the 2013 Pakistani general election. He received 62,849 votes and defeated Khawaja Sheraz Mehmood.

He was re-elected to the National Assembly as an independent candidate from Constituency NA-190 (Dera Ghazi Khan-II) in the 2018 Pakistani general election. Following his successful election, he announced to join Pakistan Tehreek-e-Insaf (PTI) in August 2018.

== Assassination attempt ==
In October 2015, seven people were killed after a bomb exploded inside the political office of Khan in Taunsa tehsil, District DG Khan. Khan was not present in his office at the time of the blast. Tehreek-e-Taliban Pakistan splinter group Jamaat Ul Ahrar claimed the responsibility for the attack.

== See also ==
- List of members of the 15th National Assembly of Pakistan
