= Hamid Raza Gilani =

Pakistani federal minister and ambassador

Minister for Industries

Syed Hamid Raza Gilani (Urdu: سید حامد رضا گیلانی; 17 August 1936 – 24 January 2004) was a former Pakistani Federal Minister and Ambassador.

== Early life ==
In keeping with his family's tradition, Syed Hamid Raza Gilani received his early education at Aitchison College, Lahore, Pakistan. Mr. Gilani attended Oxford University and was called to the Bar at Gray's Inn.

== Political career ==
Mr. Gilani's political career began in 1962 when he was elected unopposed from Multan to the National Assembly of Pakistan during the government of President Ayub Khan. He was appointed Parliamentary Secretary for Foreign Affairs. During this time he became a close friend of Zulfiqar Ali Bhutto. Mr. Gilani lost the election in 1970, joined the Pakistan Peoples Party, and was appointed Pakistan's ambassador to Kenya, where he served from 1971 to 1975. Upon returning to Pakistan in 1975 he contested elections on a PPP ticket and was elected to the National Assembly yet again. Zulfiqar Ali Bhutto, who was Prime Minister at the time, appointed him to his cabinet as Minister for Industries. During President Zia ul-Haq's regime, Mr. Gilani's group won the local bodies elections in Multan with an overwhelming majority. He was elected to the National Assembly in the non-party polls in 1985. He was nominated for Prime Minister in 1985 as the Gilani group was the largest in the non-party elections but Zia ul-Haq wanted the candidate to be from Sind. Later he served as a Senator from 1990 to 1997.

== Social work ==
Mr. Gilani played a major role in Anjuman Islamia, an organization responsible for establishing over 24 schools and colleges in Multan. He also served as the chairman of the Board of Governors of Nishtar Medical College & Hospital, Multan.

== Family background ==
His father Makhdoom Syed Muhammad Raza Shah Gilani also studied at Aitchison College where he received the much coveted Rivaz Gold Medal. He too was a politician and is best remembered for defeating Penderel Moon (later Sir Penderel Moon), the British Raj's candidate in the local elections. He was chairman of Multan District Council for many years.
