= Zartaj Gul =

Pakistani politician

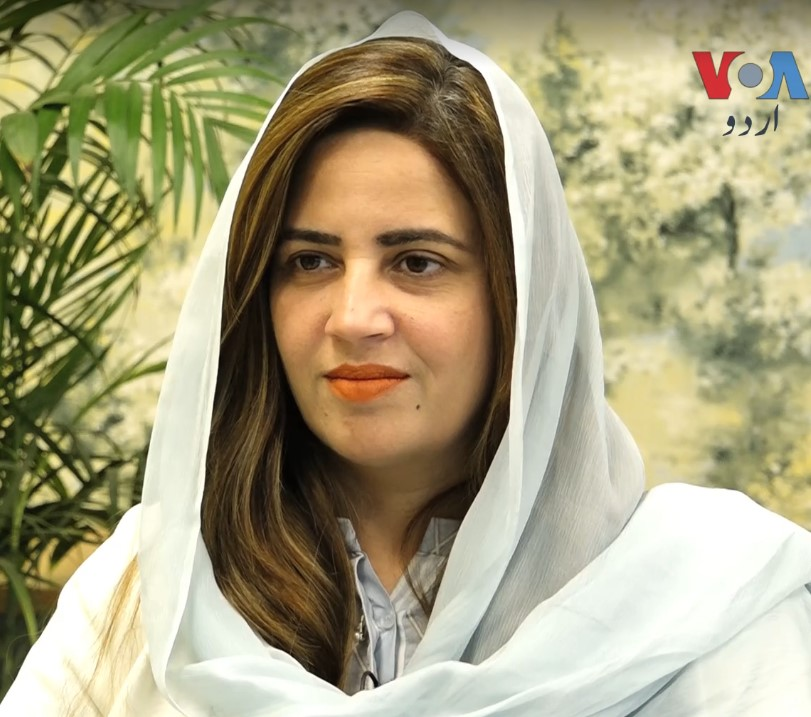

Former Minister of State for Climate Change
- In office 5 October 2018 – 10 April 2022
- President: Arif Alvi
- Prime Minister: Imran Khan
- Minister: Malik Amin Aslam

Parliamentary Leader of SIC in National Assembly of Pakistan
- In office 23 June 2024 – 5 August 2025
- Leader: Sahibzada Hamid Raza
- Succeeded by: Mehmood Khan Achakzai

Member of the National Assembly of Pakistan
- In office 29 February 2024 – 5 August 2025
- Succeeded by: Mehmood Qadir Khan
- Constituency: NA-185 Dera Ghazi Khan-II
- Majority: 55,692 (30.16%)
- In office 13 August 2018 – 10 April 2022
- Preceded by: Abdul Kareem
- Constituency: NA-191 (Dera Ghazi Khan-III)
- Majority: 25,361 (13.63%)

Personal details
- Born: November 11 October 17, 1984, in Bannu, Khyber Pakhtunkhwa, Pakistan
- Other political affiliations: PTI (2005-2026)
- Spouse: Humayun Raza Khan Akhwind (m. 2010)
- Education: Queen Mary College; National College of Arts

Zartaj Gul Wazir (Pashto) :زرتاج ګل وزير) is a Pakistani politician who served as Minister of State for Climate Change, in Imran Khan ministry from 5 October 2018 until 10 April 2022 when Imran Khan was ousted by a no-confidence motion.

She remained a member of the National Assembly of Pakistan between August 2018 to till January 17, 2023. She was a Parliamentarian elected from DG Khan in 2024. She appoint as Parliamentary Leader of Sunni Ittehad Council (SIC) since 23 June 2024.

She was resign from his National Assembly Seat on 10 April 2022 but her resignation was accepted on 17 January 2023 by then time Speaker Raja Pervaiz Ashraf.

In 2025, she sentenced 10 years of jail by Faisalabad Court, for 9 May 2023 riots. On 5 August 2025, Election Commission of Pakistan disqualified her due to conviction in 9 may cases.

== Early life and education ==
Gul hails from North Waziristan, born on 17 October 1984 Khyber Pakhtunkhwa to Ahmad Wazir, chief engineer of WAPDA and belongs to Wazir tribe.

She obtained her early education in her native town Bannu and Miramshah before moving to Lahore with her family. She attended Queen Mary College for her undergraduate studies and then National College of Arts for her postgraduate studies. She did Textile Designing from National College of Arts.

After completing her education, she joined Pakistan Tehreek-e-Insaf (PTI) and became a volunteer with Insaf Student Forum (ISF) in 2005.

She moved to Dera Ghazi Khan after getting married in 2010.

== Political career ==
Gul ran for the seat of the National Assembly of Pakistan as a candidate of PTI from Constituency NA-172 (Dera Ghazi Khan-II) in the 2013 Pakistani general election but was unsuccessful. She received 38,643 against 49,142 votes of Hafiz Abdul Kareem and lost the seat.

She was elected to the National Assembly as a candidate of PTI from NA-191 (Dera Ghazi Khan-III) in the 2018 Pakistani general election. She received 79,817 votes and defeated Awais Leghari.

On 5 October 2018, she was inducted into the federal cabinet of Prime Minister Imran Khan and was appointed as Minister of State for Climate Change.

As a member of the National Assembly and as a Minister, she advocated for gender equality and argued that Islam guarantees rights for women. During a press conference, Zartaj Gul described Imran Khan as a 'symbol of women empowerment' and defended his heavily criticized comments on sexual violence for which he was called a "rape apologist" by mainstream media. Khan had previously stated in an interview that "If a woman is wearing very few clothes, it will have an impact on the men, unless they're robots. I mean it's common sense." These remarks were widely criticized by opposition leaders and rights groups, who accused him of victim-blaming and promoting a misogynistic narrative, while Zartaj and other members of his party argued that his comments were taken out of context and were part of a broader discussion on societal issues and the role of modesty.

She was re-elected to National Assembly of Pakistan in the 2024 Pakistani General Elections, as an independent candidate supported by Pakistan Tehreek-e-Insaf (PTI) from NA-185 Dera Ghazi Khan-II and received 94,927 votes and defeat his election rival Mehmood Qadir Khan received 39,235 votes. After the official results are coming Zartaj declared as winner, following the defeat of PML(N) Candidate Mehmood Qadir Khan by a heavy margin of 55,000 plus votes, he requested the Lahore High Court for a recount in the Constituency.

On 6 October 2024, she was arrested by police after a raid on her house and was taken to an undisclosed location. Pictures of her following her arrest went viral, showing her barefoot. PTI lawyer Mir Fida Hussain stated that she was unwell and asleep at the time of the raid and was unable to wear her shawl. She was released 3 days later on 9 October 2024.

In July 2025, Zartaj Gul was sentenced to 10 years in prison by an Anti-Terrorism Court in Faisalabad for her alleged role in the May 9, 2023, protests following the arrest of PTI founder Imran Khan. She was among several senior PTI leaders, including Omar Ayub Khan and Shibli Faraz, convicted in connection with the unrest.

Critics and opposition parties have denounced the verdicts as part of a politically driven campaign by the Pakistan Army and government to silence dissent and weaken the opposition, particularly the Pakistan Tehreek-e-Insaf (PTI) leadership.

== Controversy ==
In June 2019, Gul was criticized by the media for allegedly using her position to influence NACTA in the appointment of her sister as a director in the authority. Gul's principal staff officer wrote an official letter to the Secretary Interior following up on a "telephonic conversation with Ms Zartaj Gul, Minister of State for Climate, regarding the appointment of Ms Shabnam Gul in NACTA". Prime Minister Imran Khan was said to have taken notice of the situation, and asked Gul to withdraw her letter but Gul's sister was still appointed to the position. NACTA later released a statement "clarifying" that the appointment of Shabnam Gul, Zataj Gul's sister, was merit-based even though she had no prior experience in the field. No action was taken against Gul for having sent the letter in the first place even though Imran Khan's special assistant made a statement saying that no one in the PTI government can promote their relatives/friends by using their positions.
