= Mian Ijaz ul Hassan =

Pakistani painter, teacher, art critic and writer

Mian Ijaz ul Hassan is a Pakistani painter, teacher, art critic and writer.

== Early life and career ==
Born in 1940, he studied at Aitchison College in Lahore and then at Saint Martin's School of Art in London. He later studied literature at Government College, Lahore and St John's College, Cambridge. He was associated with the National College of Arts from 1966 to 1975 where the famous Pakistani painter artist Shakir Ali acted as his mentor and guide. Later, under the Zia-ul-Haq regime, he was incarcerated in Lahore Fort after being accused of stealing a Cyclostyle machine from the college. He was later released by his reluctant guards.

Ijaz ul Hassan has written regularly on painting, art and culture. His art work has been exhibited in India, the US, France, England, Germany, Italy, Brazil, Belgium and Japan. In Pakistan, his works are displayed in the National Art Gallery, the National Assembly, the Lahore Museum, the Punjab Council of Arts (PUCAR) and the Alhamra Art Centre.

== Awards and recognition ==
- Pride of Performance award by the President of Pakistan in 1992.
