= Youth Parliament of Pakistan =

Youth Parliament Pakistan is a project launched in 2007 by an NGO named PILDAT to engage youth in Pakistan in healthy discourse and expose them to the democratic process and practices. Members of Youth Parliament Pakistan are selected for the duration of one year at a time. The first batch of Youth Parliament Pakistan was selected in 2007 and from thereon, Youth Parliament has had three batches so far including 2007 batch, 2008-09 batch and 2009-10 batch.

Establishment and facilitation of the Youth Parliament Pakistan is part of PILDAT's focus on youth in the country and youth's awareness education and training in the norms of politics and democracy in the country. PILDAT strongly feels that sustainable democracy and the sustainability of sound democratic institutions in Pakistan is not possible without youth's involvement in the democratic and political process even if this involvement is simply as a citizen or voter.

The Youth Parliament Pakistan project is currently supported by the Royal Danish Embassy, Islamabad in recognition of the importance of young people's involvement in democracy and democratic practices in Pakistan.

== Key Features of the Youth Parliament Pakistan ==
As a model Parliament for young people, the Youth Parliament Pakistan is patterned after the National Assembly of Pakistan although its membership is smaller than that of the National Assembly. Wherever possible, the Youth Parliament of Pakistan follows the rules of procedures as close to the National Assembly of Pakistan as practical. However, practices from other Parliaments are also adopted to expose Pakistani Youth to comparative parliamentary practices.

=== Membership ===
The total membership of Youth Parliament is 60. The breakdown of membership is as follows:

Provinces/Areas	No. of Seats
Punjab	28
Sindh	12
Khyber Pakhtunkhwa (KPK)	07
Balochistan	05
Islamabad Capital Territory (ICT)	03
Federally Administered Tribal Areas (FATA)	02
Azad Jammu Kashmir (AJK)	02
Gilgit-Baltistan (NA)	01
Total Membership	60
