= Rafique Haider Khan Leghari =

Pakistani politician

Sardar Rafiq Haider Khan Leghari

Chairman of Rahim Yar Khan District Council
- In office 1979–1988

Punjab Minister of Food and Agriculture
- In office 1980–1985

Member of Provincial Assembly of the Punjab
- In office 1985–2001

Zila Nazim of the Rahim Yar Khan District
- In office 2005–2010

Personal details
- Born: 24 March 1951 (age 75) Rahimabad, Punjab, Pakistan
- Other political affiliations: Pakistan Tehreek-e-Insaf

Sardar Rafiq Haider Khan Leghari (born 24 March 1951) is a Pakistani politician.

Leghari was born in the village of Rahimabad in Rahim Yar Khan District, Pakistan, the third son of Sardar Gulam Haider Khan Leghari – a landlord of the district and Member of the Legislative Assembly of the Bahawalpur Assembly. He has three brothers: Sardar Sikander Hayyat Leghari (the eldest of all brothers and ex-CSP officer), Sardar Zubair Haider Khan Leghari (the second brother and an ex-army officer), and Sardar Shafiq Haider Khan Leghari (the third and youngest brother, an agriculturist).

He received his early education from Sadiq Public School Bahawalpur. After the early death of his father in 1967, he gave up his education and returned to his village where he took control of the agricultural lands.

== Political career ==
Leghari started his political career in 1977. He was elected (unopposed) in 1979 first to district council as district chairman of Rahim Yar Khan; and then became the Minister of Food and Agriculture of Punjab in 1980. He held both offices simultaneously until 1984 when he was again elected (unopposed) as a chairman district council. He continued with both the offices until the end of his term as a minister in 1985 and chairman in 1988. He took part in the general election in 1985 as an independent candidate on a provincial Punjab assembly seat and won by majority. He was elected again on the same provincial assembly seat in 1997 and became the deputy opposition leader in Punjab Assembly. He participated in Zila Nazim election in 2001 and lost by a narrow margin. He again participated in the same elections in 2005 and won the election by one of the largest margins in Punjab. He did not participate in the general election of 2008 because he was still serving his term of Zila Nazim Rahimyar Khan. Later he joined Pakistan Tehreek-e-Insaf in September 2011.
