= Government Wards' Institute =

Defunct school in Ambala

- Ambala, Haryana; India

Information
- Funding type: Private
- Established: c. 1866
- Closed: c. 1887
- Gender: Boys

Government Wards' Institute (or Wards’ School) was a private boarding school located in Ambala, Haryana, India.

== History ==
Mr. Tighe, Deputy Commissioner of Ambala, proposed to Donald McLeod, the then Lieutenant Governor of the Punjab, that an institution be established for the good education of the young Sardars who were under his charge as wards of court. Donald McLeod warmly supported the idea, and accordingly, Wards’ School was founded in 1866. It was originally intended for the sons of Sardars of Ambala, and was later opened to the sons of Indian gentlemen of good social position from all provinces. Due to a variety of reasons, the school never became popular and was unable to justify the very purpose for which it was established. Some of these reasons were the expense involved, and the strong reluctance shown by parents to send their children far from home. It was therefore decided that it should be shifted to Lahore under improved conditions, in the form of Aitchison College. The school was finally closed in 1887.

== Administration ==
The Commissioner and Deputy Commissioner of Ambala supervised the management of the school. A superintendent was in charge of each pupil's household, personal expenses, and education, and was assisted by the masters in the schoolroom. Pupils’ examinations were conducted annually under the supervision of the Inspector of Schools for the Ambala Circle, who would afterwards submit his report to the Government of Punjab.

== Curriculum ==
The school provided education in English, Persian, Urdu, history, geography, mathematics, and several other subjects. It also paid special attention to games and outdoor exercises of every description.

== Boarding ==
The pupils lived in the school compound and each had their own separate establishment. They had a month-long vacation during the hot weather, a fortnight off at Christmas, and holidays were also given on locally significant occasions.

== Fees ==
The fees paid by the pupils varied according to circumstances, but for wards and minors of Ambala, the rate was 12 per cent of their incomes.

== Alumni ==
The following are some of the school’s alumni.

- Sardar Jiwan Singh of Shahzadpur
- Sardar Narindar Singh

== See also ==
- Aitchison College
