= Sardar Muhammad Khan Laghari =

Pakistani politician

Member of the National Assembly of Pakistan
- In office 13 August 2018 – 25 January 2023
- Constituency: NA-192 (Dera Ghazi Khan-IV)

Personal details
- Born: June 4, 1970 (age 56) Multan, Punjab, Pakistan
- Party: PMLN (2025-present)
- Other political affiliations: IPP (2023-2025); PTI (2018-2023); PML(Q) (2013-2018); IND (2002-2013)

Sardar Muhammad Khan Laghari (born 4 June 1970) is a Pakistani politician who has been a member of the National Assembly of Pakistan from August 2018 till January 2023.

== Early life and education ==
He was born on 25 December 1970 in Multan.

He received the degree of Bachelor of Science in Finance from Lahore School of Economics in 2001.

== Political career ==
He was elected to the Provincial Assembly of the Punjab as an independent candidate from Constituency PP-243 (Dera Ghazi Khan-IV) in the 2002 Pakistani general election. He received 20,316 votes and lost the seat to Jaffar Khan Leghari. In the same election, he also ran for the seat of the Provincial Assembly of the Punjab as an independent candidate from Constituency PP-245 (Dera Ghazi Khan-VI) but was unsuccessful. He received 17,223 votes and lost the seat to Farooq Leghari. Following his successful election, he joined the Pakistan Muslim League (Q) (PML-Q).

He was elected to the National Assembly of Pakistan from Constituency NA-192 (Dera Ghazi Khan-IV) as a candidate of Pakistan Tehreek-e-Insaf (PTI) in the 2018 Pakistani general election. In the same election, he was re-elected to the Provincial Assembly of the Punjab as a candidate of the PTI from Constituency PP-292 (Dera Ghazi Khan-VIII). Following his successful election, he abandoned his Punjab assembly seat in favor of his National Assembly seat.
