= Nadir Leghari =

Pakistani politician

Sardar Nadir Akmal Khan Leghari

Provincial Minister of Sindh for Irrigation and Power
- In office 2002–2007
- Succeeded by: Syed Murad Ali Shah

Personal details
- Born: Pakistan
- Spouse: Sayeeda Leghari
- Profession: Politician

Nadir Leghari (born as Nadir Akmal Khan Leghari) is a Pakistani politician who served as the Provincial Minister of Sindh for Irrigation and Power from 2002 till 2007.

He joined Imran Khan's Pakistan Tehreek-e-Insaf in 2010, and was elected President of its Sindh Chapter in March 2013 and the Chairman of Insaf Professionals Forum-Sindh. He was part of the Pakistan Muslim League (Q) government in 2002. He lost his seat (PS-7 Ghotki-III) to the Pakistan Peoples Party’s Sardar Ahmed Ali Khan Pitafi in the 2008 general elections and did not contest the 2013 general elections.

Sardar Nadir Akmal Khan Leghari is a graduate and has been active in the agriculture and business sector. His wife is a businesswoman. He has two children.
