= Rustam Jamali =

Pakistani politician (1963–2009)

Sardar Rustam Jamali

Excise and Taxation Minister of Balochistan
- In office 21 November 2008 – Assassinated 6 August 2009
- Succeeded by: Sardar Nasir Khan Jamali

Personal details
- Born: 1963 Balochistan, Pakistan
- Died: 6 August 2009 (aged 45–46) Karachi, Sindh
- Party: Independent

Mir Rustam Jamali (1963–2009) was the Excise and Taxation Minister of Balochistan, Pakistan, assassinated in August 2009.

== See also ==
- Balochistan
- Zafarullah Khan Jamali
