= Choti Zareen =

Choti Zareen چوٹی زیریں
- Town and union council
- Interactive map of Choti Zareen
- Coordinates: 29°50′41″N 70°29′32″E
- Country: Pakistan
- Region: Punjab
- District: Dera Ghazi Khan District

Government
  - Type: Union council
  - MNA: Muhammad Khan Leghari
  - MPA: Awais Leghari
- Elevation: 114 m (374 ft)
- Time zone: UTC+5 (PST)
- Postal Code: 32200
- Area code: 064

Choti Zareen (Urdu: چوٹی زیریں) is a town and union council of Dera Ghazi Khan District, Tehsil Kot Chutta in the Punjab province of Pakistan.

It is 30 km to the southwest of Dera Ghazi Khan and 26 km to the east of Sulaiman Range.
