= Dost Muhammad Khosa =

Pakistani politician (born 1973)

Sardar Dost Muhammad Khosa
- دوست محمد کھوسہ

15th Chief Minister of Punjab
- In office 11 April 2008 – 8 June 2008
- Preceded by: Sheikh Ijaz Nisar (caretaker)
- Succeeded by: Shehbaz Sharif

Member of the Provincial Assembly of Punjab
- In office 9 April 2008 – 2013
- In office 1999–1999

Personal details
- Born: 22 October 1973 (age 53) Lahore, Punjab, Pakistan
- Citizenship: Pakistan
- Party: PRM (2026-present)
- Spouse: Sapna Khan
- Relations: Muhammad Saif-ud-Din Khosa (brother); Sardar Muhammad Mohiuddin Khosa (nephew)
- Parent: Zulfiqar Ali Khosa (father)

Sardar Dost Muhammad Khosa (Urdu: دوست محمد کھوسہ; born 22 October 1973) is a Pakistani politician affiliated with Pakistan People's Party. He was elected as 15th Chief Minister of Punjab on 11 April 2008, serving until 8 June 2008. He served for only 58 days.

He joined the Pakistan People's Party (PPP) on 22 December 2018.

== Early life ==
Khosa is the son of former Punjab Governor and senior political leader of Pakistan Sardar Zulfiqar Ali Khosa. He was born in Lahore on 22 October 1973.

Khosa received his primary education from Aitchison College Lahore, and graduated from University of the Punjab. While at Aitchison College, Khosa was the member of the college football, riding and athletics team.

== Political career ==
Khosa was first elected as MPA when his father vacated a provincial seat after taking oath as Punjab Governor in August 1999. He had also served as UC Nazim of Churratta, D.G. Khan and later as Naib District Nazim D.G. Khan until the general election in 2008. Having been elected as an MPA, he got elected as the youngest Chief Minister of the Punjab and relinquished the charge for Mian Muhammad Shahbaz Sharif. Khosa later on also served as Minister for Public Health Engineering, Housing & Urban Development; Environment; and Local Government & Community Development Departments during 2008–13.

In the 2018 general elections, he contested election (PP-289) as an independent candidate but lost.

In 2024 Pakistani elections he contested from NA-185 Dera Ghazi Khan-II and PP-289 Dera Ghazi Khan and lost both, to independent candidates.

After disqualification of Zartaj Gul of Pakistan Tehreek-e-Insaf (PTI), he contested by election from NA-185 Dera Ghazi Khan-II, and lost to Mehmood Qadir Khan of PML(N).

== Personal ==
Khosa belongs to a Baloch tribe. He is the youngest of three sons of former Punjab Governor Sardar Zulfiqar Ali Khosa.

== See also ==
- Baloch people

Political offices
Preceded by Shiekh Ejaz Nisar	Chief Minister of Punjab; 2008	Succeeded by Shahbaz Sharif
