= Minister for Water and Power =

Water and Power of Pakistan
- Incumbent; Hamza Shahbaz
- Ministry of Water & Power
- Reports to: Prime Minister of Pakistan
- Seat: Islamabad
- Nominator: Prime Minister of Pakistan
- Appointer: President of Pakistan
- Website: www.mowp.gov.pk

The Minister for Water and Power heads the federal Ministry of Water and Power in Pakistan. The following is the list of all Water and Power ministers of Pakistan to date.

== List of ministers for water and power of Pakistan ==
Name of Minister of Water and Power	Entered office	Left office
Raja Sikander Zaman	9 March 1981	26 February 1985
Mir Zafarullah Khan Jamali	10 April 1985	28 January 1986
Lt. Gen. (Retd) Jamal Said Mian	28 January 1986	20 December 1986
Qazi Abdul Majeed Abid	1 February 1987	15 May 1988
Wazir Ahmad Jogezai	15 May 1988	29 May 1988
Elahi Bux Soomro (Caretaker)	9 June 1988	20 November 1988
Sardar Farooq Ahmad Khan Leghari	28 December 1988	6 August 1990
Ghulam Mustafa Khar (Caretaker)	7 August 1990	6 November 1990
Shahzada Muhammad Yousaf	10 September 1991	18 July 1993
Khursheed K . Marker (Caretaker)	5 August 1993	19 October 1993
Ghulam Mustafa Khar	26 January 1994	5 November 1996
Abdullah J. Memon (Caretaker)	5 November 1996	17 February 1997
Chaudhry Nisar Ali Khan	25 February 1997	11 July 1997
Raja Nadir Pervez	11 July 1997	6 August 1998
Gohar Ayub Khan	6 August 1998	10 October 1999
General Pervez Musharraf	10 October 1999	23 November 2002
Aftab Ahmad Sherpao	23 November 2002	25 August 2004
Liaquat Ali Jatoi	30 June 2004	15 November 2007
Tariq Hameed (Caretaker)	22 November 2007	25 March 2008
Raja Pervez Ashraf	31 March 2008	11 February 2011
Syed Naveed Qamar	5 March 2011	2 June 2012
Chaudhry Ahmad Mukhtar	4 June 2012	16 March 2013
Doctor Musadik Malik (Caretaker)	3 April 2013	4 June 2013
Khawaja Asif (Federal Minister), Abid Sher Ali (Minister of State)	7 June 2013	28 July 2018
Imran Khan	18 August 2018	11 September 2018
Omar Ayub	11 September 2018	17 April 2021
Hammad Azhar	17 April 2021	10 April 2022
Awais Leghari	18 March 2024	24 April 2025

== See also ==
- Constitution of Pakistan
- President of Pakistan
- Prime Minister of Pakistan
- Finance Minister of Pakistan
- Interior Minister of Pakistan
