= Nazir Leghari =

Pakistani journalist and writer (born 1955)

Nazir Leghari نذیر لغاری
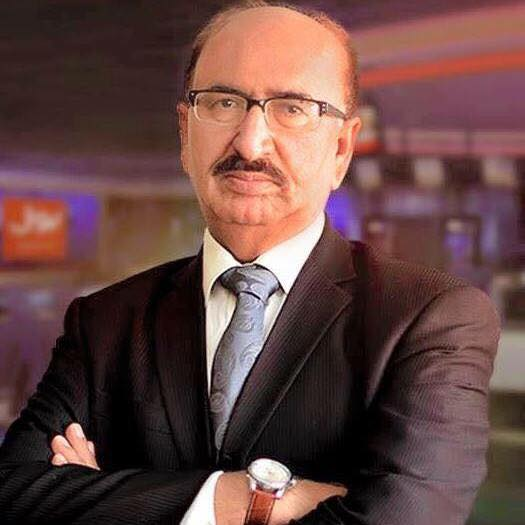
- Born: 11 November 1955 (age 70); Jampur, Punjab, Pakistan
- Occupation: Journalist
- Spouse: Abida Batool
- Children: 6

Nazir Leghari (Urdu: نذیر لغاری, born 11 November 1955) is a Pakistani writer, who formerly edited Daily Awam.

== Published works ==
Leghari is the author of several books:

- Siyaasat e Douraan
- Seenay Jhokan Deedain Deray
- Tareekh Bolti Hai
- Arz-e-Haal
- Tarikh Saz Log (2017)
- Tarikhi Khatoot (2019)
- Sehra ka Raqs (2019)
- Wisakh (2021)
- Walo Watanen (2021)

He interviewed many politicians during the Movement for the Restoration of Democracy. He wrote 80 biographical episodes of G. Allana.

== Award ==
- Pride of Performance Award (تمغۂ حسنِ کارکردگی) by the President of Pakistan in 2014.
