= Millat Party =

Millat Party ملت پارٹی
- Leader: Farooq Ahmad Khan Leghari
- Founder: Farooq Ahmad Khan Leghari
- Founded: 1997
- Dissolved: May 2004
- Merged into: PML(Q)
- National affiliation: National Alliance

The Millat Party (Urdu: ملت پارٹی) was a political party in Pakistan, formed by Farooq Leghari, former president of Pakistan, once he was no longer the president, and needed a platform to survive politically. He had the money to start a small-scale party. Because of his support to the establishment, a number of people joined him. Millat Party was part of the ruling coalition led by PMLQ (2002–2007) where it was represented by Sardar Farooq Leghari's son, Owais Leghari.

In the legislative elections held on 20 October 2002, the party was part of the National Alliance that won 4.6% of the popular vote, and 12 out of 272 elected members.

In May 2004, Millat Party merged with the Pakistan Muslim League-(Q) along with several other parties to form a unified Pakistan Muslim League.
