= Jhoke Uttra =

Jhok Uttra
- Union council and town
- Location in Pakistan
- Coordinates: 29°50′38″N 70°43′37″E
- Country: Pakistan
- Province: Punjab
- District: Dera Ghazi Khan District

Government
- Elevation: 354 ft (108 m)
- Time zone: UTC+5 (PST)
  - Summer (DST): +6

Jhoke Uttra is a town and union council of Dera Ghazi Khan District in the Punjab province of Pakistan.
