= K&N's =

Pakistani frozen food company

- Trade name: K&N's
- Type: Private
- Industry: Poultry; Frozen food
- Founded: 1964; 62 years ago
- Founders: Khalil Sattar; Naushaba Khalil
- Headquarters: K&N's Centre, 160 Shahrah-e-Faisal, Bangalore Town, Karachi, 75350, Pakistan, Karachi, Pakistan
- Number of locations: 166
- Area served: Worldwide
- Key people: Khalil Sattar (Chairman); Adil Sattar (CEO)
- Products: Frozen chicken products, raw chicken, parent stock, day-old chicks, poultry feed
- Website: kandns.pk

K&N's is a Pakistani multinational poultry and frozen food company based in Karachi, Pakistan. It was founded in 1964 by Khalil Sattar and Naushaba Khalil.

== History ==
K&N's was founded in January 1964 in Karachi by Khalil Sattar, then a college student, together with his wife, Naushaba Khalil, from whose first initials the company name was derived. At a time when there was no commercial poultry production in Pakistan and chickens were predominantly raised as backyard poultry, Sattar started a small broiler farm with 1,000 chicks housed in a spare shed at his family's edible oil extraction factory in Karachi.

In 1971, Sattar established the company's own feed mill at Karachi to supply customised feed to K&N's growing broiler operations. By 1974, K&N's entered into an exclusive franchise agreement with Babcock Corporation of Ithaca, New York, to become the sole producer and distributor of Babcock pullet chicks in Pakistan. In 1989, the company established the K&N's Poultry Diagnostic and Research Institute with assistance from the United States Agency for International Development (USAID).

In 2001, K&N's returned to broiler growing on a larger scale by introducing controlled-environment facilities. In 2003, the company began opening company-operated retail "Chicken Stores" to sell chicken and related products, growing the chain to 68 outlets by 2011.

By 2011, K&N's was one of the largest broiler-chick producers and the market leader for processed chicken products in Pakistan. In May 2012, K&N's discontinued supplies to the cash-and-carry chains Metro and Makro following a dispute over pricing and in-store advertising charges.

In 2013, K&N's acquired the former Birds Eye frozen-foods plant on Phillips Street in Fulton, New York, for the establishment of its first overseas processing facility, investing more than US$5 million in renovation. The U.S. subsidiary, K&N's Foods USA, LLC, was founded on 3 January 2014 and began commercial production at the Fulton plant on 4 August 2014 to serve in the United States, Canada, and Europe.

== Operations ==
It is engaged in integrated poultry operations including breeding, hatching, feed milling, broiler growing, poultry processing and production of Halal ready-to-cook and fully cooked chicken products.

K&N's is categorized into two areas:

- K&N's Poultry, which has a parent stock production unit, day-old chicks, feed and broilers
- K&N's Foods, to control processed chicken and ready-to-cook and fully cooked chicken products
