= Qaisrani =

Baloch clan of Rind tribe

Qaisrani is a Baloch clan of the Rind tribe. They live mostly in Balochistan, Pakistan. They are also settled in Southern Punjab regions of Dera Ghazi Khan and Multan.

The current tribal chief is Sardar Mir Badshah Qaisrani since 2002.
