= Pildat =

Pakistani think tank

PILDAT
- Formation: 2001; 25 years ago
- Founder: Ahmed Bilal Mehboob
- Headquarters: Pakistan
- Region served: Pakistan
- Website: pildat.org

Pakistan Institute of Legislative Development and Transparency, commonly called Pildat, is a Pakistani think tank which promotes democracy. Pildat is an independent, non-profit think tank that mainly focuses on democracy, governance and public policy.

It also organizes Youth Parliament of Pakistan.
