= Mehmood Qadir Khan =

Pakistani politician

Mehmood Qadir Khan Leghari

Member of the National Assembly of Pakistan
- Incumbent
- Assumed office 27 November 2025
- Preceded by: Zartaj Gul
- Constituency: NA-185 Dera Ghazi Khan-II

Member of the Provincial Assembly of the Punjab
- In office 23 February 2024 – 5 November 2025
- In office 1 June 2013 – 31 May 2018

Tehsil Nazim, Dera Ghazi Khan
- In office 2005–2009

Personal details
- Born: 1 January 1963 (age 63) Dera Ghazi Khan, Punjab, Pakistan
- Party: PMLN (2013-present)

Mehmood Qadir Khan Leghari is a Pakistani politician who is Member of the National Assembly of Pakistan from 27 November 2025, Member of the Provincial Assembly of the Punjab, from February 2024 to November 2025, and previously from May 2013 to May 2018

== Early life and education ==
He was born on 1 January 1963 in Dera Ghazi Khan.

He has the degree of Master of Business Administration which he obtained in 1987 from University of the Punjab.

== Political career ==
He was elected to the Provincial Assembly of the Punjab as an independent candidate from Constituency PP-246 (Dera Ghazi Khan-VII) in the 2013 Pakistani general election. He joined Pakistan Muslim League (N) in May 2013.

In December 2013, he was appointed as Parliamentary Secretary for Chief Minister's Inspection Team.

He has also served as Tehsil Nazim, Dera Ghazi Khan from 2005 to 2009.
