= Sardar Mir Badshah Qaisrani =

Sardar Meer Badshah Qaisrani (born 7 November 1965) is a Pakistani politician. He is also the 21st tribal chief of famous Baloch tribe named "Qaisrani". He was a member of the Provincial Assembly of the Punjab PP-240 constituency of Tonsa from 2002 to 2013. He also served as Parliamentary Secretary for Industries, Commerce & Investment (2003–07). He returned to the Assembly for his second consecutive term in general elections 2008 and was Parliamentary Secretary for Forests on 31 January 2009, however, he resigned from the Assembly on 17 April 2010.

He has been re-elected from the same constituency in bye-election held on 5 June 2010. His grandfather, Sardar Manzoor Ahmad Qaisarani was Member, Provincial Assembly of West Pakistan during 1965-1969 and his father served as Member, Punjab Assembly twice during 1990-93 and 1997–99.
