= Rahimabad, Punjab, Pakistan =

Village in Punjab, Pakistan

Rahimabad
- Village
- Location within Pakistan
- Coordinates: 28°10′N 70°42′E
- Country: Pakistan
- Province: Punjab
- District: Rahim Yar Khan
- Tehsil: Sadiqabad Tehsil

Government
  - Last Chairman: Sardar Muhammad Azhar Khan Leghari(2015-2018)

Area
  - Total: 30 km^{2} (12 sq mi)

Population (1998)
  - Total: 13,000
  - Estimate (2007): 15,000
- Time zone: UTC+5 (PST)
- Number of Union councils: 01

Rahimabad is a village in the Sadiqabad Tehsil, Rahim Yar Khan District of Punjab, Pakistan. It is approximately 24 kilometers west of the city of Sadiqabad.
