= Farooq Leghari =

President of Pakistan from 1993 to 1997

- فاروق لغاری
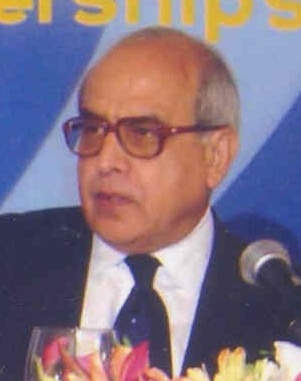
- Leghari in 1995

8th President of Pakistan
- In office 14 November 1993 – 2 December 1997
- Prime Minister: Benazir Bhutto; Malik Meraj Khalid (acting); Nawaz Sharif
- Preceded by: Wasim Sajjad (acting)
- Succeeded by: Wasim Sajjad (acting)

Minister of Foreign Affairs
- In office 19 October 1993 – 14 November 1993
- Prime Minister: Benazir Bhutto
- Preceded by: Abdul Sattar (acting)
- Succeeded by: Aseff Ahmad Ali

Minister for Water and Power
- In office 28 December 1988 – 6 August 1990
- Prime Minister: Benazir Bhutto
- Preceded by: Wazir Ahmad Jogezai
- Succeeded by: Shahzada Muhammad Yousaf

Member of the National Assembly of Pakistan
- In office 1988–2011

Personal details
- Born: Sardar Farooq Ahmad Khan Leghari; 29 May 1940 Choti Zareen, Dera Ghazi Khan District, Punjab, British India (now Pakistan)
- Died: 20 October 2010 (aged 70) Rawalpindi, Pakistan
- Resting place: Choti Zareen, Dera Ghazi Khan, Pakistan
- Party: Pakistan Muslim League (Q) (2002–2010)
- Other political affiliations: Millat Party (1997–2002); Pakistan People's Party (1988–1997)
- Children: Awais Leghari; Jamal Leghari
- Education: Aitchison College; Forman Christian College; St Catherine's College, Oxford

Farooq Ahmad Khan Leghari (Note: Urdu: سردار فاروق احمد خان لغاری) (29 May 1940 – 20 October 2010) was a Pakistani politician who served as the eighth president of Pakistan from 1993 until his resignation in 1997. He, prior to his presidency, also served as the minister of foreign affairs in 1993; the minister for water and power from 1988 to 1990; and a senator from 1975 to 1977. He was the first ethnic Baloch to be elected president.

Born into a Baloch tribal and influential feudal family, Leghari was educated at Aitchison College, the Forman Christian College in Pakistan, and St Catherine's College, Oxford in United Kingdom. Upon return from the UK, he sat for the Civil Services Exam in 1964 and started his career as a civil servant, remained commissioner sargodha division, prior to getting in to politics in 1973 and tenured as Senator representing the Punjab on the Pakistan Peoples Party (PPP) platform from 1975 to 1977. He contested the 1977 he won the National Assembly Elections on Pakistan People's Party ticket and was appointed Minister for Industries. In 1980s, he led demonstrations aimed against President Zia-ul-Haq's administration and successfully ran in general elections held in 1988. From 1990 to 1993, he worked under Benazir Bhutto as her deputy Leader of the Opposition and participated in the 1993 Pakistani general elections.

His credentials and reputation eventually led him to secure a nomination for the presidency by Prime Minister Benazir Bhutto and was elected as President in 1993. However, he began receiving criticism over the controversial appointments of Senior Justices of the Supreme Court of Pakistan and was implicated in Mehran Bank scandal. Differences began to emerge with Prime Minister Benazir Bhutto on policy issues in 1995 and he surprisingly dismissed his leader's government in 1996. His political ambitions later clashed with Prime Minister Nawaz Sharif and his intervention to retain Justice Sajjad Ali Shah as Chief Justice finally led to his resignation in 1997. He remained active in politics starting his own Political Party "Millat Party" which was party of the "National Alliance" in the 2002 General Elections, the party merged into the PML(Q) in 2004. He returned to the National Assembly in 2008 Elections. Leghari died from a long-term heart illness at the Combined Military Hospital in Rawalpindi on 20 October 2010.

== Biography ==
Farooq Leghari was born on 2 May 1940 in Choti Zareen, a village located in Dera Ghazi Khan District, Punjab, British India. The prefix Sardar, a title of nobility, added before his name that indicated the Tumandar (Chief) of his Leghari Tribe. Leghari's family was a Baloch of Punjab and known for its wealth. He has a grand daughter named Maziyah Jamal leghari Many of its members served as hereditary chiefs, and the family has remained active in politics since the British Raj. His mother was a Pashtun from Mardan district; one of his sisters married the son of the Nawab of Kalabagh. Leghari was 185 cm tall. His father, Nawabzada Muhammad Khan Leghari and his grandfather Khan Bahadur Nawab Sir Muhammad Jamal Khan Leghari were progressive leaders who modernised their tribe. His father took prominent part in the Pakistan Movement and was confined as a political prisoner in 1946. After the partition of India, his father served as minister in the provincial government of Punjab from 1949 until 1955.

Farooq Leghari was initially schooled at the famed Aitchison College in Lahore where he was the "College Prefect" and "Head Boy" and graduated at top of his class winning the coveted "Rivaz Gold Medal" for the "Best Graduating Student" in 1957. He went onto attend the Forman Christian College University where he gained BA with Honours in Economics in 1960. He went to United Kingdom to attend the St Catherine's College, Oxford where he received master's degree in Philosophy, Politics and Economics (PPE).

Leghari was an avid and competitive sportsman and played tennis, captaining the Aitchison College Tennis team and became a regular on the polo field. In 1974, he represented Pakistan as shooter in 7th Asian Games held in Tehran, Iran. Farooq Leghari was the major landowner in the country and owned approximately 40,500 acres (164 km^{2}) of land. After the death of Farooq Khan Leghari, his son Jamal Khan Leghari became the 23rd Chief of Leghari tribe.

=== Civil service and politics ===
Upon returning to Pakistan after completing education in UK, he joined the Central Superior Services (CSS) in 1964 and worked as civil servant in East Pakistan. In 1973, he resigned from the civil service and joined the Pakistan People's Party (PPP) on the invitation of Prime Minister Zulfiqar Ali Bhutto. In 1975, he was elected as Senator for Punjab and participated in general elections held in 1977 from the DG Khan constituency. He served as Minister of Defence Production and was appointed Secretary-General of the PPP in 1978.

In 1980s, he became known as a leading figure of presiding mass demonstrations against President Zia-ul-Haq's administration and was imprisoned several times by Police. Leghari participated in general elections held in 1988 from DG Khan's constituency. He was appointed Minister for Water and Power under Prime Minister Benazir Bhutto. After President Ghulam Ishaq Khan dismissed the Benazir Bhutto government, Leghari successfully defended his constituency in general elections held in 1990. He served as Deputy Leader of the Opposition under Benazir Bhutto, against Prime Minister Nawaz Sharif.

In 1993, he witnessed the resignations of President Ghulam Ishaq Khan and Prime Minister Nawaz Sharif, and joined the caretaker cabinet of caretaker Prime Minister Moeenuddin Ahmad Qureshi as Finance Minister. During this period, he presided over the 21st Islamic Conference of Foreign Ministers held in Karachi from 25 to 29 April 1993. He successfully participated in general elections held in 1993 and retained his seat in the National Assembly and was the only PPP MNA from Dera Ghazi Khan.

Leghari was appointed Foreign Minister by Prime Minister Benazir Bhutto on 19 October 1993 but soon won the nomination for the presidency.

== Presidency ==
His credentials and "clean reputation" as opposed to politicians accused of mass corruption and white collar crimes won him the support from Prime Minister Bhutto and Pakistan Peoples Party (PPP). He accepted the nomination and ran in the presidential elections against Wasim Sajjad, the Acting President and PML(N) nominee by Nawaz Sharif.

As a result of indirect voting, Leghari received 274 votes in his favour against 168 votes for Wasim Sajjad. On 13 November 1993, Sardar Farooq Leghari was appointed the President of Pakistan for a term of five years. He vowed to repeal the Eighth Amendment to the Constitution of Pakistan and expressed his support for Prime Minister Benazir Bhutto. However, no bill was ever presented to repeal the Eighth Amendment to the Constitution. The law and order situation in the country worsened, especially in Karachi where the police operation resulted in various and unaccountable deaths.

In 1994–95, a major scandal was revealed by the sting operation led by the FIA that gained national attention. Known as the Mehrangate, Leghari's and Bhutto's name was implicated in the corruption scandal in news media. However, the PPP forcefully suppressed the FIA's investigations and judicial inquires as well as media coverage. Leghari supported the Bhutto administration's internal and foreign policies and staunchly backed Prime Minister Bhutto's initiatives at the national level. Leghari met with Indian Prime Minister Narasimha Rao and Queen Elizabeth when she paid a state visit to Pakistan during his tenure as president.

His political relations with Benazir Bhutto drifted apart over on policy issues concerning the internal politics and judicial nominations for the Supreme Court of Pakistan in 1996. In 1993, Leghari confirmed the nomination of Justice Sajjad Ali Shah as Chief Justice of Pakistan who was known to be closer to the PPP's ideology. In 1994, Prime Minister Bhutto nominated 20 senior judges for the appointment to the Supreme Court; of which, 13 had political relations with the PPP. Some of the nominated judges had not been practised judges and controversial reputations in the law circles. The PPP government began pressuring Chief Justice Shah to dissuade him from taking up to appeals against the nominations. President Leghari backed Chief Justice Shah over the appointment and confirmations that created problems with the Prime Minister Bhutto who saw this as a conspiracy being hatch by the Chief Justice Shah. Notoriety over the confirmations of additional judges in the High Courts further maligned Leghari's image as the appointments were seen as "inappropriate."

The situation with Prime Minister Bhutto further escalated when President Leghari raised issue of senior ministers' involvement in corruption and Asif Ali Zardari's appointment as Investment Minister. Leghari also suspected Benazir Bhutto and Asif Zardari involvement in controversial murder of Murtaza Bhutto that occurred in 1996, despite Prime Minister Bhutto hinted Leghari's involvement. On October–November 1996, there were several meetings between President Leghari and Prime Minister Bhutto to resolve the issue but the two sides used the intelligence community against each other. The economic recession further escalated the situation and President Leghari surprisingly dismissed the Benazir's administration using the Eighth Amendment to the Constitution on charges of corruption, economic recession, lawlessness and extra judicial killings.

=== Resignation and post-presidency ===
A caretaker set-up was formed under Acting Prime Minister Malik Meraj Khalid and general elections were held in 1997 that witnessed the return of Nawaz Sharif with a heavy mandate in all over the country. Prime Minister Sharif decisively removed the Eighth Amendment by approving the Thirteenth Amendment and oversaw its complete effect that ultimately made President Leghari as figurehead. Leghari sought the nomination for the second term but the chances of his re-election were diminished due to PPP's dilution in the Parliament.

Problems between Chief Justice Shah and Prime Minister Sharif further escalated when Chief Justice Shah decided to listen to appeals against the Fourteenth and Fifteenth Amendment bills and the PML(N) partisan attacked the Shah's court in 1997. President Leghari tried intervened in the matter in support of Chief Justice Shah but this only made it worse for Leghari when Prime Minister Sharif decided to bring the impeachment movement against President Leghari. On 2 December 1997, President Leghari resigned from the presidency to avoid the possible impeachment which also resulted in the resignation of the Chief Justice Shah, also the same year.

His post-presidency marked with his active involvement in politics when he found the Millat Party which entered into a coalition of seven parties, known as the National Alliance, to participate in the general elections held in 2002. The National Alliance won enough seats in the National Assembly to form government as a coalition with the PML(Q) that was supported by President Pervez Musharraf. In 2004, he left his own party and joined the PML(Q) and supported his son, Awais Leghari, becoming the cabinet member. His elder son, Jamal Leghari, was elected as member of Senate on PML(Q) platform.

In 2003, Leghari reportedly remarked that he had dismissed Prime Minister Bhutto after the rules of conducts were violated, while responding to the criticism by the PPP.

=== Family Political History/Legacy ===
Grandfather: Khan Bahadur Nawab Sir (Tumandar) Muhammad Jamal Khan Leghari

Punjab Legislative Council 1921, 1923, 1927, 1930 Punjab Legislative Assembly 1937 Minister Public Works, 1946, 1947 "The first sitting was held on 5 January 1948. Sir Robert Francis Mudie, Governor of West Punjab appointed Mr Muhammad Jamal Khan Leghari to perform the duties of Speaker till new Speaker was elected". Punjab Legislative Assembly 1951, First Sitting Presided by Sardar Jamal Muhammad Khan Leghari

Father: Nawabzada Sardar Muhammad Khan Leghari, B.A.

Punjab Legislative Assembly 1951 Minister Public Works, Buildings and Roads, Electricity and Transport, Irrigation, Revenue, Excise and Taxation, Resettlements and Colonies. Provincial Assembly of West Pakistan 1956

Uncle: Nawabzada Sardar Atta Muhammad Khan Leghari

Provincial Assembly of the Punjab 1972

Uncle: Nawabzada Sardar Mahmood Khan Leghari

Provincial Assembly of the Punjab 1972

Cousin: Sardar Muhammad Omer Khan Leghari

Provincial Assembly of the Punjab 1985 Provincial Assembly of the Punjab 1988

Cousin: Sardar Jaffar Khan Leghari

District Council Chairman Rajanpur Provincial Assembly of the Punjab 1985 Provincial Assembly of the Punjab 1988 Provincial Assembly of the Punjab 1993 National Assembly of Pakistan 1997 National Assembly of Pakistan 2002 National Assembly of Pakistan 2008 National Assembly of Pakistan 2013 National Assembly of Pakistan 2018

Cousin: Sardar Maqsood Ahmed Khan Leghari

Provincial Assembly of the Punjab 1977 Chairman District Council Dera Ghazi Khan National Assembly of Pakistan 1985, Minister for Overseas Pakistanis Provincial Assembly of the Punjab 1985 Provincial Assembly of the Punjab 1988 Provincial Assembly of the Punjab 1990, Minister Provincial Assembly of the Punjab 1993, Minister Irrigation Provincial Assembly of the Punjab 1997 Zila Nazim Dera Ghazi Khan 2005

Cousin: Sardar Mansoor Ahmed Khan Leghari

Chairman District Council Dera Ghazi Khan Provincial Assembly of the Punjab 1990 National Assembly of Pakistan 1993 Senate of Pakistan 1997-2000 Provincial Assembly of the Punjab 1985

Son: Jamal Leghari

District Nazim Dera Ghazi Khan 2000 Senate of Pakistan 2016-20012 Provincial Assembly of the Punjab 2013

Son: Awais Leghari

Provincial Assembly of the Punjab 1997 National Assembly of Pakistan 2002, Minister Information Technology and Telecommunication National Assembly of Pakistan 2010 National Assembly of Pakistan 2013, Minister Power Provincial Assembly of the Punjab 2018, (Deputy Leader of Opposition)

== Death ==
Farooq Leghari briefly fought a heart illness since 2000s and initial reports claimed that he was ill for some time, owing to complications with his heart. Farooq Leghari died on 20 October 2010 in Rawalpindi due to a heart related illness and he was undergoing surgery at the Combined Military Hospital in Rawalpindi at the time of his death.

Residents of Dera Ghazi Khan and political dignitaries attended his funeral services and he was laid to rest in Choti Zareen, DG Khan District, Punjab, Pakistan on 21 October 2010.

== See also ==
- 1993 in Pakistan
- Pakistan Peoples Party
- Parliamentary history of Pakistan

== Notes ==
Regnal titles
Preceded by Sardar Muhammad Leghari	Tumandar of Leghari; 1973–2010	Succeeded by Jamal Leghari
Political offices
Preceded by Abdul Sattar; Acting	Minister of Foreign Affairs; 1993	Succeeded by Aseff Ahmad Ali
Preceded by Wasim Sajjad; Acting	President of Pakistan; 1993–1997	Succeeded by Wasim Sajjad; Acting
