= Awais Leghari =

Pakistani politician (born 1971)

- اویس احمد خان لغاری

Minister for Energy
- Incumbent
- Assumed office 17 March 2024
- President: Asif Ali Zardari
- Prime Minister: Shehbaz Sharif
- Preceded by: Khurram Dastgir; Hamza Shahbaz
- In office 4 October 2017 – 31 May 2018
- President: Mamnoon Hussain
- Prime Minister: Shahid Khaqan Abbasi
- Deputy: Abid Sher Ali (As Minister of State)

Minister for Railway
- In office 11 March 2024 – 17 March 2024
- President: Asif Ali Zardari
- Prime Minister: Shehbaz Sharif
- Preceded by: Shahid Ashraf Tarar; Hanif Abbasi; Usman Awaisi

Federal Minister without portfolio
- In office 4 August 2017 – 4 October 2017
- President: Mamnoon Hussain
- Prime Minister: Shahid Khaqan Abbasi

Federal Minister for Information Technology and Telecommunications
- In office 23 November 2002 – 15 November 2007
- President: Pervez Musharraf
- Prime Minister: Zafarullah Khan Jamali; Shujaat Hussain; Shaukat Aziz

Federal Minister for Privatization and Investment
- In office 30 March 2006 – 24 April 2006
- President: Pervez Musharraf
- Prime Minister: Shaukat Aziz

Member of the National Assembly of Pakistan
- Incumbent
- Assumed office 29 February 2024
- Constituency: NA-186 Dera Ghazi Khan-III
- In office 1 June 2013 – 31 May 2018
- Constituency: NA-173 (D.G.Khan-III)
- In office 29 March 2011 – 16 March 2013
- Constituency: NA-172 (Dera Ghazi Khan-II)
- In office 2002–2007
- Constituency: NA-184 Dera Ghazi Khan-I

Member of the Provincial Assembly of Punjab
- In office 24 October 2018 – 15 January 2023
- Constituency: PP-292 (Dera Ghazi Khan-VIII)
- In office 20 February 1997 – 12 October 1999
- Constituency: PP-204 (Rajanpur-I)

Personal details
- Born: March 22, 1971 (age 55) Dera Ghazi Khan, Punjab, Pakistan
- Party: PMLN (2013-present)
- Other political affiliations: PTI (2011-2013); PML(Q) (2004-2011); National Alliance (2002-2004); Millat Party (1997–2002)
- Relations: Jamal Leghari (brother)
- Parent: Farooq Leghari (father)

Islamabad

Awais Ahmad Khan Leghari (Urdu: اویس احمد خان لغاری; born 22 March 1971) is a Pakistani politician currently serving as the Federal Minister of Energy in the cabinet led by Prime Minister Shehbaz Sharif since 18 March 2024.He served as Federal Minister for Railway but removed by Prime Minister on 18 March 2024. Previously, he held the position of Federal Minister for Power in the Abbasi cabinet from October 2017 to May 2018. Leghari has been a member of the National Assembly of Pakistan from 2002 to 2007 and again from March 2011 to May 2018. He was elected from NA-186 Dera Gazi Khan 3 in the 2024 general elections and has been serving as a member of the National Assembly since 29 February 2024.

== Early life and education ==
He was born on 22 March 1971 in Lahore, Pakistan to former President of Pakistan, Farooq Leghari.

According to PILDAT, he was born on 1 August 1971.

He received the degree of Bachelor of Arts from University of Rochester in 1994.

== Political career ==
He was elected to the Provincial Assembly of the Punjab as an independent candidate from Constituency PP-204 (Rajanpur-I) in the 1997 Pakistani general election.

He was elected as the member of the National Assembly on a ticket of National Alliance (Pakistan) from NA-173 (D.G.Khan-III) in the 2002 Pakistani general election. He served as Minister for Information Technology and Telecommunications.

He ran for the seat of the National Assembly on a ticket of Pakistan Muslim League (Q) from NA-173 (D.G.Khan-III) in the 2008 Pakistani general election but was unsuccessful.

He was elected as the member of the National Assembly from NA-172 (D.G.Khan-II) in by-election held in March 2011. The seat became vacant after his father Farooq Leghari died who won the seat in 2008 election.

He was elected as the member of the National Assembly as an independent candidate from NA-173 (D.G.Khan-III) in the 2013 Pakistani general election. He joined Pakistan Muslim League (N) in May 2013.

Following the election of Shahid Khaqan Abbasi as Prime Minister of Pakistan in August 2017, he was inducted into the federal cabinet of Abbasi. He was sworn in as Federal Minister without any portfolio on 4 August 2017.

He was offered the portfolio of ministry of science and technology but he refused to accept it. Reportedly, he demanded the portfolio of privatization. In October 2017, he was made Federal Minister for Power. Upon the dissolution of the National Assembly on the expiration of its term on 31 May 2018, Leghari ceased to hold the office as Federal Minister for Power.

He was re-elected to the Provincial Assembly of the Punjab as a candidate of PML-N from Constituency PP-292 (Dera Ghazi Khan-VIII) in by-election held on 14 October 2018.

He was re-elected to the National Assembly from NA-186 Dera Ghazi Khan-III as a candidate of PML(N) in the 2024 Pakistani general election. He received 100,252 votes and defeated Sajjad Hussain, an independent candidate supported by Pakistan Tehreek-e-Insaf (PTI), who received 97,990 votes.
