= Kot Chutta =

Kot Chutta كوٹ چهُٹّہ
- Town
- Location in Punjab Location in Pakistan
- Coordinates: 29°53′12″N 70°39′02″E
- Country: Pakistan
- Region: (Punjab, Pakistan) Punjab Province
- District: Dera Ghazi Khan
- Tehsil: Kot Chutta Tehsil
- As a State: 1680's -1857
- Named for: Chutta Khan Gurmani

Government
  - Type: Provincial Government
  - MPA: Sardar Mohayaddin Khan Khosa

Population (2023)
  - Total: 59,870

Literacy
- Time zone: UTC+5 (PST)
- Postal code: 32350
- Area code: +64

Kot Chutta (Urdu: كوٹ چهُٹّہ) is a town in Dera Ghazi Khan District in the Punjab Province of Pakistan. Kot Chutta is situated off the Indus Highway.

The area is known for its fertile agricultural land and for the production of various crops. Its major union councils are Choti Zaireen, Jhoke Uttra, Basti Malana and Jhakkar Imam sharif. Languages spoken are Saraiki, Urdu and Balochi. Around 87% of the town population is Saraiki speaking.

== History ==
It was founded in the 17th century same time when Ghazi Khan Mirani invaded Dera Ghazi Khan. This city was founded by a Gurmani Tribe ruler named Chutta khan Gurmani. It was taken into government rule after the partition of British India. Many migrants from the sub-continent settled here. In Kot Chutta City, the Gurmani tribe has not been recognized as significant due to its historical economic challenges.

The city was given the position of Tehsil in 2010.

== Health ==
Every union council has a rural health department along with one tehsil headquarter hospital. The THQ was given 2 Ambulances for any emergency services.

== Demography ==
=== Population ===
Historical population
Year	Pop.	±% p.a.
2017	51,666	—
2023	59,870	+2.49%

As of the 2023 census, Kot Chutta town has population of 59,870.
