= Zulfiqar Ali Khosa =

Pakistani politician (1935–2026)

Senator Zulfiqar Ali Khosa
- ذولفقار علی کھوسہ

31st Governor of Punjab
- In office 18 August 1999 – 12 October 1999
- President: Muhammad Rafiq Tarar
- Prime Minister: Nawaz Sharif

Member of the Senate of Pakistan
- In office 12 March 2012 – 12 March 2018
- Prime Minister: Shahid Khaqan Abbasi
- Constituency: General seat from Punjab

Member of the Provincial Assembly of the Punjab
- In office 3 July 2008 – 12 March 2012
- Constituency: PP-243 Dera Ghazi Khan-IV
- In office 18 February 1997 – 11 August 1999
- Succeeded by: Dost Muhammad Khosa
- Constituency: PP-201 Dera Ghazi Khan-III
- In office 18 October 1993 – 17 November 1996
- Constituency: PP-201 Dera Ghazi Khan-III
- In office 5 November 1990 – 28 June 1993
- Constituency: PP-201 Dera Ghazi Khan-III
- In office 30 November 1988 – 6 August 1990
- Constituency: PP-201 Dera Ghazi Khan-III
- In office 12 March 1985 – 30 May 1988
- Constituency: PP-184 Dera Ghazi Khan-I
- In office 9 April 1977 – 5 July 1977
- Constituency: PP-192 Dera Ghazi Khan-VII

Member of the West Pakistan Assembly
- In office 9 June 1962 – 8 June 1965
- Constituency: Dera Ghazi Khan-II

Personal details
- Born: 20 October 1935 Bahadurgarh, Dera Ghazi Khan District, Punjab Province, British India (now Pakistan)
- Died: 9 April 2026 (aged 90) Lahore, Punjab, Pakistan
- Other political affiliations: PTI (2018–2023); PMLN (1993–2018); Islami Jamhoori Ittehad (1988–1993); Independent (1985–1988)
- Spouse(s): Nadra Begum Faryal Khosa (m. 2014)
- Children: Dost Muhammad Khosa (son); Muhammad Saif-ud-Din Khosa (son)
- Relatives: Sardar Muhammad Mohiuddin Khosa (grandson); Latif Khosa (cousin); Amjad Farooq Khan (cousin)

Sardar Zulfiqar Ali Khan Khosa (Urdu: سردار ذولفقار علی خان کھوسہ; 20 October 1935 – 9 April 2026) was a Pakistani politician who served as a senator and Governor of Punjab. He represented Punjab in the Senate of Pakistan. Khosa was elected to the Provincial Assembly of Punjab for nine tenures in 1970, 1977, 1985, 1988, 1990, 1993, 1997, 2008 and 2013. He was also elected to the West Pakistan Assembly in 1962. Khosa also contested the National Assembly of Pakistan in the 2018 general election but lost to Amjad Farooq Khan.

== Life and career ==
Khosa was born on 20 October 1935. He was one of the most senior politicians of Pakistan and was famous for his consistent control in the politics of Punjab from 1986 to 2018. He came from a Baloch Khosa tribe. He was born in Bahadurgarh, Dera Ghazi Khan District, Punjab Province, British India (now Pakistan).

He became the Tumandar of the Khosa in 1935 after the death of his father, Dost Muhammad Khan Khosa.

Khosa was the Governor of the Punjab from 17 August 1999 to 12 October 1999. He was a senator from Punjab, Pakistan, from 2012 to 2018.

He had three sons: Hissam Uddin Khan Khosa, Muhammad Saif-ud-Din Khosa, and Dost Muhammad Khosa.

Khosa died in Lahore on 9 April 2026, at the age of 90.

Political offices
Preceded by Shahid Hamid	Governor of Punjab; 1999	Succeeded by Muhammad Safdar
