= Leghari (clan) =

Baloch tribe

Languages
- Balochi, Sindhi, Saraiki

Religion
- Islam

Related ethnic groups
- Baloch, Sindhi, Saraiki

The Leghari, Lighari or Laghari (Balochi: لغاری) is a Baloch tribe. The Leghari tribe mainly resides in Sindh, Punjab and Balochistan. The Sardar of Laghari tribe is Sardar Jamal khan Laghari. They mostly speak Saraiki or Sindhi in Sindh.
