= National Alliance (Pakistan) =

The National Alliance was a coalition of Millat Party, Sindh Democratic Alliance, National Peoples Party, National Awami Party (Wali) and Sindh National Front in Pakistan. It was headed by former Pakistani Prime Minister Ghulam Mustafa Jatoi, who was also the head of his own National Peoples Party (NPP).

At the 2002 legislative elections in Pakistan, held on 20 October 2002, the Alliance won 4.6% of the popular vote and 16 out of 342 elected members.

In May 2004, National Alliance merged with the ruling PML (Q) and various other parties to form a united Pakistan Muslim League.
