= Jehangir Karamat =

Pakistan Army general (born 1941)

Jehangir Karamat NI(M) HI(M) TBt
- جہانگیر کرامت
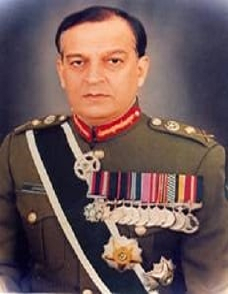
- Born: 20 February 1941 (age 85); Karachi, Sind, British India
- Education: Pakistan Military Academy; Command and Staff College; Command and General Staff College; National Defence University
- Military career
- Allegiance: Pakistan
- Branch: Pakistan Army
- Service years: 1958–1998
- Rank: General
- Unit: 13th Lancers
- Commands: Chief of General Staff, Army GHQ; II Strike Corps, Multan; Armoured Corps; DG Army Rangers; DG for Military Operations; Pakistan Armed Forces–Middle East Command
- Conflicts: Indo-Pakistani War of 1965; Indo-Pakistani War of 1971
- Awards: Nishan-e-Imtiaz (Military); Hilal-e-Imtiaz (Military); Tamgha-e-Basalat; Order of King AbdulAziz; Order of Military Merit; Turkish Legion of Merit; The Legion of Merit

General Jehangir Karamat NI(M) HI(M) TBt (Urdu: جہانگیر کرامت ; born 20 February 1941) is a retired military officer, diplomat, public intellectual, and a former professor of political science at the National Defense University. Prior to serving as a Chief of Army Staff, he also served as the 9th Chairman of the Joint Chiefs of Staff Committee from 1997 to 1998.

After joining the Pakistan Army in 1958, he entered the Pakistan Military Academy at Kakul, and passed out in 1961 to later serve in the combat in conflicts with India in 1965 and in 1971. In 1995, he came into national prominence after he notably exposed the attempted coup d'état against Prime Minister Benazir Bhutto, and eventually appointed an army chief and later Chairman joint chiefs. His tenure is regarded for his pivotal role in enhancing the democracy and the civilian control when he staunchly backed Prime Minister Nawaz Sharif's authorisation of atomic-testing programme in 1998.

On 6 October 1998, Karamat was forcibly relieved from his four-star commands by Prime minister Nawaz Sharif over a disagreement on national security and reforms of the intelligence community. He is also one of very few army generals in the military history of Pakistan to have resigned over a disagreement with the civilian authorities.

After his resignation, he accepted the professorship at the Stanford University in California and appointed to head Pakistan's diplomatic mission as an Ambassador but was later removed due to strong advocacy for democracy.

Karamat has been credited with foresight prediction of the dangers of unbalanced civil-military relations and the rise of foreign-supported homegrown terrorism in the country. Many of his recommendations on national security eventually became part of counterterrorism policy by Prime Minister Nawaz Sharif in 2013.

== Early life and education ==
Jehangir Karamat was born on 20 February 1941 in Karachi into a Pashtun Kakazai family who initially hailed from Sahiwal, Punjab.

His father, Ahmad Karamat, was an officer in the British Indian Civil Service who would later embark on his career as a bureaucrat in the Government of Pakistan in 1947.

After educating and graduating from the St. Patrick's High School in Karachi in 1958, Karamat joined the Pakistan Army when accepting at the Pakistan Military Academy (PMA) in Kakul in Khyber-Pakhtunkhwa.

In 1961, Karamat was commissioned as a 2nd-Lt in the 13th Lancers of the Corps of Armoured.

In 1969, Capt. Karamat attended the Command and Staff College in Quetta where he was noted for his intellect and competence at any level of courses he took as required in the curriculum. In 1971, Capt. Karamat graduated and qualified as the psc.

After the third war with India in 1971, Major Karamat was one of the last military officers who were sent to the United States to study at the U.S. Army's Command and General Staff College at Fort Leavenworth in Kansas.

Upon his graduation from the U.S. Army's Command and General Staff College, Major Karamat then attended the National Defence University where he graduated and gained the MSc in the International Relations in 1976–77. In 1976, Karamat completed his MSc in International Relations from there; and following his return, Karamat completed his master's programme at the National Defence University. In 1978–80, Major Karamat attained the MSc in War studies where his master's thesis argued and enlightened on the failure of performance of armed forces in third war with India 1971.

== Military career ==
=== During the Indo-Pakistani wars ===
In 1963, Lt. Karamat was posted in his Armoured Corps to initially commanding a formation of main battle tanks. In 1965, Lt. Karamat commanded an infantry platoon during the second war with India in the Akhnur Sector in the Indian-administered Kashmir. Lt. Karamat's platoon was the first unit that had penetrated 10 miles (16 km) into the enemy territory, which encouraged backup military companies to move forward into the enemy territory. In war performance, the 13th Lancers had suffered death of fourteen soldiers, including three officers, while twenty eight were wounded. For this action, the 13th Lancers was awarded the battle honour, Dewa— Chumb and Jaurian of 1965, and was also awarded the title of The Spearhead Regiment. Although the 1965 war ended in a defeat for Pakistan, the regiment's performance was excellent.

He progressed well in the army, eventually promoted to captain in 1966; and elevated as major in 1971. In 1971, Major Karamat commanded the company of the Aromoured Corps on the Western Front of the third war with India, defending the territories of Punjab, Pakistan against the approaching Indian Army.

During this time, Maj. Karamat was the commanding officer in the 15th Lancers attached to the Baloch Regiment, along with the 13th Lancers that was fighting in the Shakargarh area of Sialkot Sector, which is now known as Battle of Barapind. The regiment was awarded battle honour of Bara Pind 1971.

=== Staff and war appointments ===
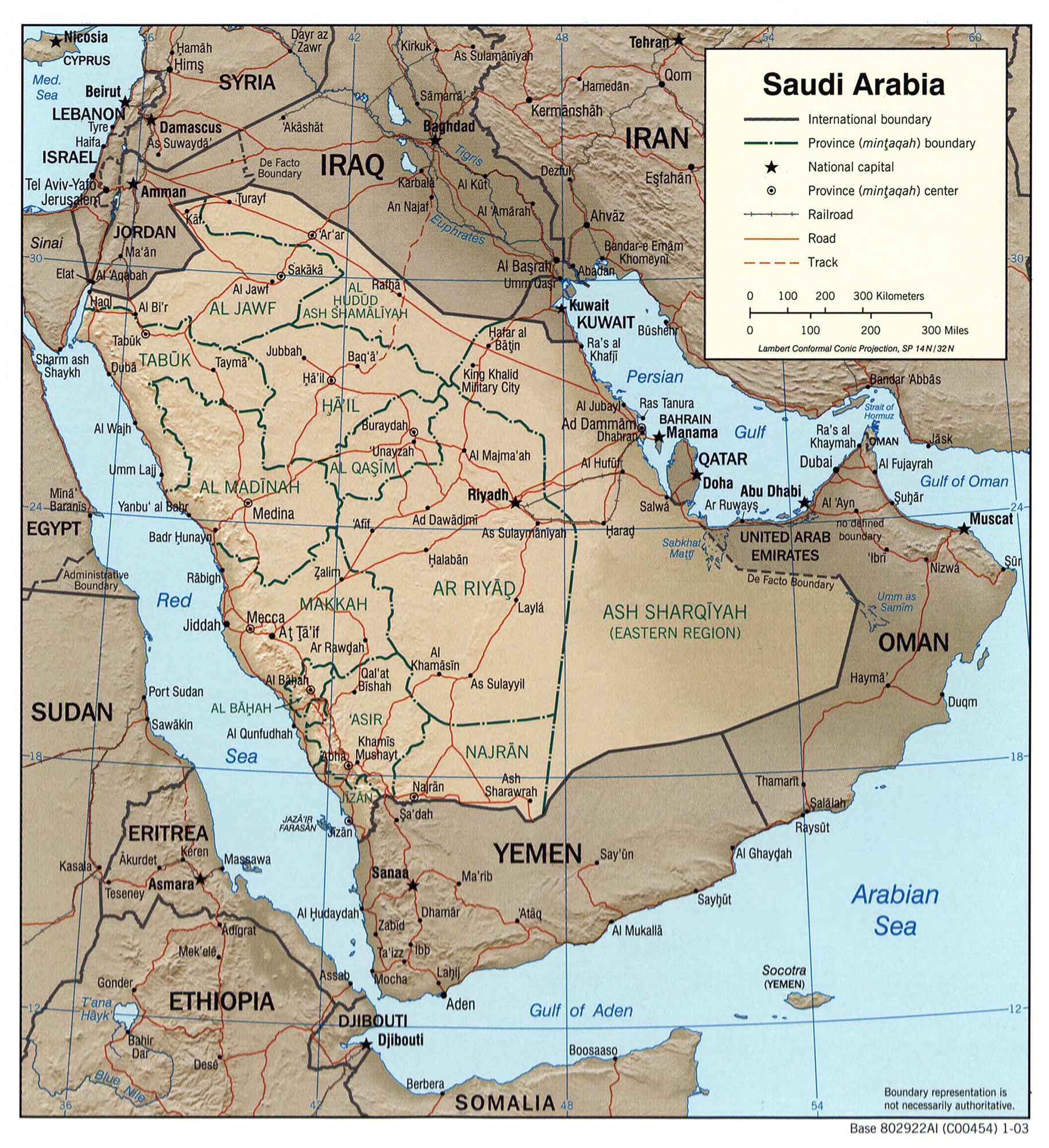
Brig. Karamat served as an OC of the Pakistan Armed Forces–Middle East Command in the 1980s near the Saudi–Jordanian border.

In 1979–80, Lt-Col. Karamat was posted as an instructor at the Armed Forces War College (AFWC) of the National Defence University (NDU), instructing on War studies courses. In 1981–83, Col. Karamat was moved at the Air War College, and did not participate in the Soviet intervention in Afghanistan during his teaching assignments before promoting as one-star rank army general in the Pakistan Army.

In 1983–88, Brig. Karamat was appointed officer commanding of the Pakistan Armed Forces–Middle East Command, consisting of the joint armed branches in the Saudi Arabia. Initially stationed to cover the area of responsibility of Tabuk and Khamis Mushait in Saudi Arabia, Brig. Karamat Pakistan Armed Forces–Arab Contingent during the height of the Iran–Iraq War, protecting the territorial sovereignty of the Saudi Arabia. In 1988, Brig. Karamat returned from his combat duty, promoting to the two-star rank assignment at the Army GHQ. From 1988 to 1991, Major-General Karamat served as the DGl of the Directorate-General of the Military Operations (DGMO), where he was credited with playing a crucial role in advancing the fighting capabilities of the Pakistan Army while he planned numerous military exercises for Pakistan Army, and reviewed the contingency operations in Kargil sector.

In 1991, Maj-Gen. Karamat was appointed Director-General of the Pakistan Army Rangers in Sindh but this appointment was short-lived when he was promoted to the three-star rank in 1992.

In 1992, Lieutenant-General Karamat was appointed field commander of the II Strike Corps, stationed in Multan, which he commanded until 1994. In 1994, Lt-Gen. Karamat was eventually elevated as the Chief of General Staff (CGS) at the Army GHQ under then-chief of army staff General Abdul Waheed Kakar. From 1993 to 1996, Karamat continued to serve as honorary Colonel Commandant, and then Colonel-in-Chief—both ceremonial posts—of the Armoured Corps from 1996 to 1998.

In 1995, Lt-Gen. Karamat rose to public prominence when he had the Military Intelligence (MI) to infiltrate within the Pakistan Army to apprehend the rogue culprits for attempting a coup d'état. Acting under orders from the General Karamat, DG MI Major-General Ali Kuli Khan monitored the activities of Major-General Zaheerul Islam Abbasi who himself was posted at the Army GHQ. The MI tapped the conversations and tracked down the culprits behind the coup. Upon revelation, Lieutenant-General Karamat forwarded the case and facilitated the high-ranking joint JAG court hearings at the specified military courts, and convened many proceedings while the hearings were heard by the military judges led by a Vice-Admiral. His actions were widely perceived in the country, and for his efforts, General Karamat was conferred with national honours in public conventions and state gatherings.

=== Chief of Army Staff ===
After approving the retirement papers of General Kakar, Lieutenant-General Karamat was appointed the Chief of Army Staff by Prime Minister Benazir who approved the paperwork for this appointment on 18 December 1995. As per Prime Minister Benazir Bhutto's approval, President Farooq Leghari confirmed the promotion of Lieutenant-General Karamat to the four-star rank and was appointed the Chief of Army Staff when General Kakar was due to retire on 12 January 1996.

At the time of his promotion, he was the senior most general at that time, and therefore at promotion to four-star general, he superseded no one. At the time of his promotion, there were four senior generals in the race to replace Kakar as Chief of Army Staff: Lieutenant-General Jehangir Karamat, chief of general staff (CGS); Lieutenant-General Nasir Akhtar, quartermaster general (QMG); Lieutenant-General Muhammad Tariq, inspector-general training and evaluation (IGT&E) at the GHQ; and Lieutenant-General Javed Ashraf Qazi, commander XXX Corps stationed in Gujranwala. As Chief of Army Staff, General Karamat tried to work with the Prime minister and President at once, but soon came to understand that the misconducts of politicians and bureaucrats would eventually lead to the dismissal of Benazir Bhutto's final government.

General Karamat reached out to then-Speaker of the National Assembly Yousaf Raza Gillani and "leaked" intelligence information and tried convincing Benazir Bhutto and President Leghari to resolve their issues, and emphasised to focus on good governance. At one point, General Karamat wrote:

In my opinion, if we have to repeat past events then we must understand that Military leaders can pressurize only up to a certain point. Beyond that, their own position starts getting undermined because the military is after all a mirror image of the society from which it is drawn.

— General Jehangir Karamat commenting on Benazir's dismissal,

=== Chairman of Joint Chiefs ===
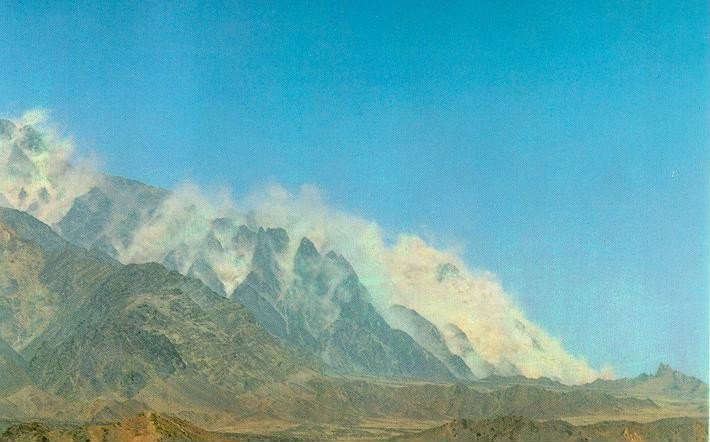
As Chairman joint chiefs, Gen. Karamat oversaw the military aspects of nuclear testing after receiving authorization from Prime Minister Sharif in 1998.

In 1997, Chairman joint chiefs Air Chief Marshal Farooq Feroze Khan was due retirement. On immediate basis, Prime Minister Nawaz Sharif appeared in news channels to confirm General Karamat as the new Chairman joint chiefs. The appointment met no resistance in the military, and General Karamat was appointed Chairman joint chiefs; he superseded no one.

General Karamat drove Pakistan Armed Forces to focus on more professional duties rather than playing politics. Karamat worked on integrating Pakistan's military on a common platform, and had his staff work on inter-services coordination in the battlefield. Karamat strengthened the joint work coordination and joint logistics of the military at the war time situations, resolving many issues that would hamper the performances of the inter-services in the war or peacetime situations.

As an aftermath of India's nuclear tests in 1998, General Karamat acted as principal military adviser to the government, aiding the Prime Minister Nawaz Sharif on military platform. At the telephonic meeting with the Prime Minister Nawaz Sharif, President Bill Clinton offered lucrative aid to Pakistan for not testing its devices; Prime Minister Sharif's response was inconclusive. President Bill Clinton described the meeting with the Prime Minister Nawaz Sharif to Strobe Talbott: "You can almost hear the guy [Sharif] wringing his hands and sweating."

With requests made by Strobe Talbott CENTCOM commander, General Anthony Zinni and US Chairman Joint chiefs General Henry Shelton, met with General Karamat to withdraw the decision to conduct nuclear test. Zinni's meeting with Karamat was described by Strobe Talbott as less contentious. General Karamat and General Zinni were able to draw "soldier–to–soldier" bond. General Karamat made it clear that the final decision would be carried out by the civilian government. At the NSC cabinet meeting, the Pakistani government, military, scientific, and civilian officials were participating in a debate, broadening, and complicating the decision-making process. Although, General Karamat debated towards presenting the national security and military point of view, the final decision was left on Prime Minister Nawaz Sharif's say.

After the decision was made, General Karamat was notified of Prime Minister Nawaz Sharif's decision and asked the military to be stand-by orders. After providing the joint military logistics, the nuclear tests were eventually carried out on 28 May 1998, as Chagai-I, and on 30 May 1998 as codename: Chagai-II. As dawn broke over the Chagai mountains, Pakistan became the world's seventh nuclear power.

=== Removal from Chairman joint chiefs ===
As the nuclear tests were conducted, there was a strong feeling in the military all together that any concession to India on Kashmir policy and other related issues would lead to a decline in the prestige and standing of the armed forces. After the failure to pass the fifteenth amendment to the Constitution, there were concerns raised by Benazir Bhutto and the Pakistan Peoples Party on Prime Minister Nawaz Sharif's absolute control over the politics, national security, and foreign policy.

On 6 October 1998, General Karamat who lectured at the Naval War College in Karachi on the civic-military relations and presented the idea of reestablishing the official National Security Council (NSC) where military could have representation in the country's politics. General Karamat openly spoke on the role of the internal intelligences, such as FIA and IB, carrying out vendetta-like operations against political opponents and insecurity-driven and expedient policies while Pakistan capsized, at the behest of the politicians. Prime Minister Sharif and his cabinet members perceived this idea as Chairman joint chiefs's interference in national politics, therefore Sharif forced Karamat to resign when he criticised Pakistan's political leadership and advocated a National Security Council that would give the military a constitutional role in running the country, similar to Turkey's. In 1998, Prime Minister Sharif decided to relieve General Karamat of the chairmanship of joint chiefs, eventually having him tender his resignation at the Prime Minister's Secretariat.

The relief of the famous and famed general by the popular politician led to a storm of public controversy. Many influential ministers and advisers in Prime Minister Sharif's circle saw this decision as "ill-considered" and "blunder" made by the Prime Minister. At the military, Admiral Fasih Bokhari (Chief of Naval Staff at that time) criticized General Karamat for resigning but Karamat defended his actions as "right thing" to do as he lost the confidence of a constitutionally and popularly elected Prime Minister.

As General Karamat received a full guard of honour retirement in a colorful ceremony as Chairman joint chiefs and chief of army staff, Prime Minister Sharif's mandate plummeted and his popularity waned as the majority of the public disapproved of the decision to relieve Karamat. Prime Minister Sharif's further suffered with wide public disapproval after appointing much-junior General Pervez Musharraf in both capacities, overruling the Admiral Bokhari's turn as the Chairman joint chiefs. In 1999, Musharraf's unilateral initiation of the Kargil war against India nearly pushed Pakistan and India to the brink of an all-out war between the two Nuclear states. Eventually, in the same year, Musharraf staged a successful coup d'état and overthrew Prime Minister Sharif.

Upon winning the general elections in 2013, Prime Minister Sharif did exactly what General Karamat had called for; first reestablishing the NSC with military gaining representation in the country's politics; and further making more reforms in intelligence community.

== Academic career ==
Before elevating to four-star assignments, General Karamat was the full tenured professor of the Political science at the National Defense University and held the chair of military science at the Armed Forces War College. Among his notable students included Pervez Musharraf, Ali Kuli Khan, Fasih Bokhari and Abdul Aziz Mirza who studied under his guidance. Karamat had significant influence on Bokhari and Musharraf's philosophy and critical thinking.

In 2000, Karamat accepted the professorship of War studies at the CISAC Institute of the Stanford University in Stanford, California, United States. In addition, he was selected as a scholar and awarded research associateship on civil military relations at the Brookings Institution based in Washington, D.C., United States. In 2001, Karamat joined the United Nations (UN) and was a part of the area study on Afghanistan. Thereafter, Karamat joined the influential Islamabad Policy Research Institute (IPRI) as the chairman of the board of governors.

== Later career ==
=== Ambassador to the United States ===
In 2004, Karamat was first mentioned and named for the appointment as the Pakistan Ambassador to the United States. His nomination came after the outgoing Pakistan Ambassador, Ashraf Jehangir Qazi's term was due to expire. On 23 September 2004, Pakistan Ambassador Qazi was appointed by then-Secretary General of the United Nations, Kofi Annan, as Special Representative of the Secretary-General for the United Nations Assistance Mission in Iraq. On 10 December 2004, Karamat presented his credentials to President George W. Bush.

On 23 March 2006, Pakistani news media reported that Ambassador Karamat was to be replaced by retired Major General Mahmud Ali Durrani. The reports further stated Ambassador Karamat, who took his post on a two-year contract, would be returning home after only a year and a half. These speculations were confirmed by the Foreign Office (FO) and noted that "Karamat will not be in the reception line at the Chaklala Airbase to welcome President George Bush".

During his stint as Pakistan Ambassador, Karamat made the pro-democracy statements at the different Pakistani American gatherings, while passing critics to President Musharraf's style of running the civilian government. In private, Karamat confided in Washington based U.S. journalist that "General Musharraf had made up this story to create wedge between Prime Minister Nawaz Sharif and him to get him fired in 1998."

=== Founding the Spearhead Research think tank ===
After his ambassadorship, General Karamat founded a socio-political policy and analysis institute, Spearhead Research, which focuses on social, economic, military and political issues concerning Pakistan and Afghanistan. General Karamat is the director and contributor to the Spearhead Research Institute.

== Writings ==
Jehangir Karamat has written extensively on national security, civil-military relations, and strategic policy in Pakistan and South Asia. His notable works include:

"Sustained Political Progress: The Supportive Role of the Military" – In this essay, published as a book chapter in Pakistan at Seventy: A Handbook on Developments in Politics, Economy and Society (2018), Karamat discusses the role of the military in facilitating political stability and democratic consolidation in Pakistan.

"Missile Acquisition by Pakistan: Military Strategic Imperatives" – An article published in the journal South Asian Survey in 2004, where Karamat analyzes the military and strategic logic behind Pakistan's missile development and its implications for regional deterrence.

Guest columns for Force India – Karamat contributed multiple opinion pieces to the Indian defense monthly magazine Force India in 2003, covering issues such as regional security, Indo-Pak relations, and civil-military dynamics. Some of his articles include "Dangers of Complacency", "The Peace Primer", "The Burden of Power", and "Through the Dusty Looking Glass".

== Awards and decorations ==

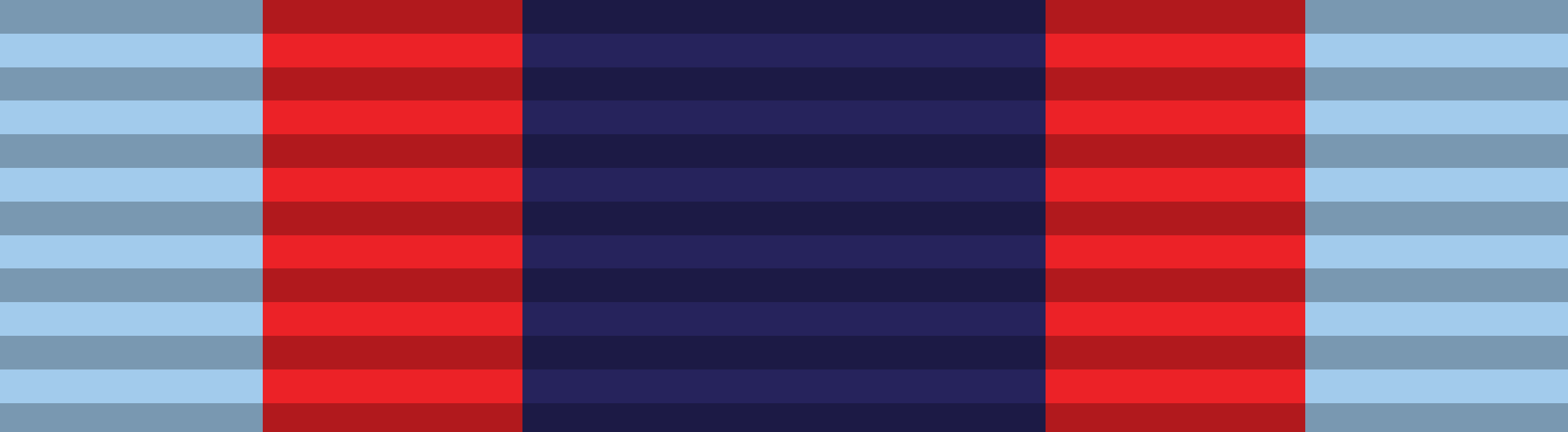

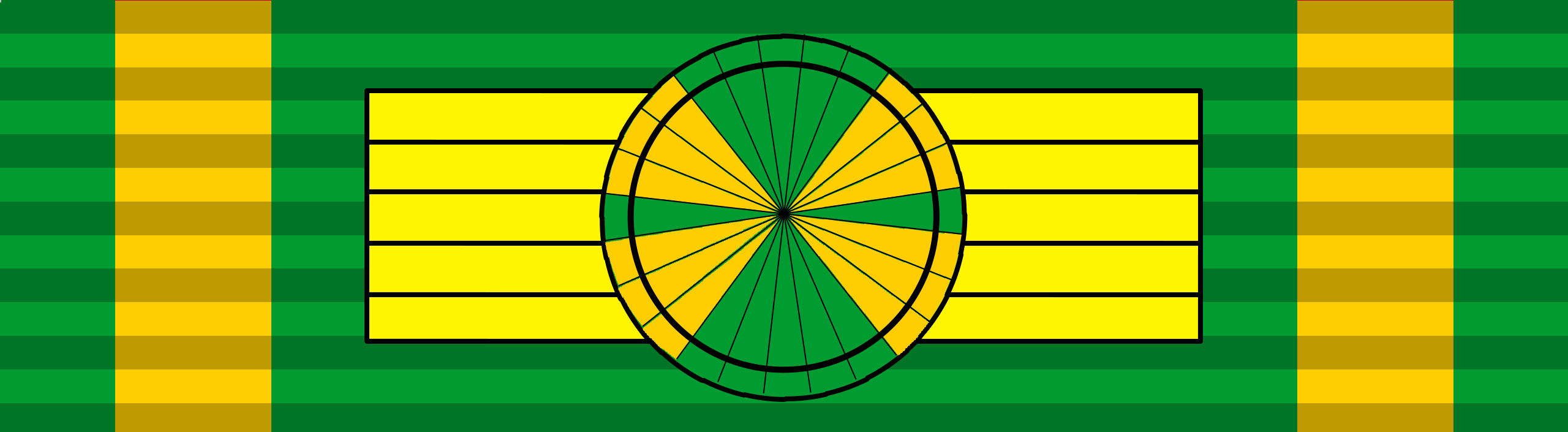

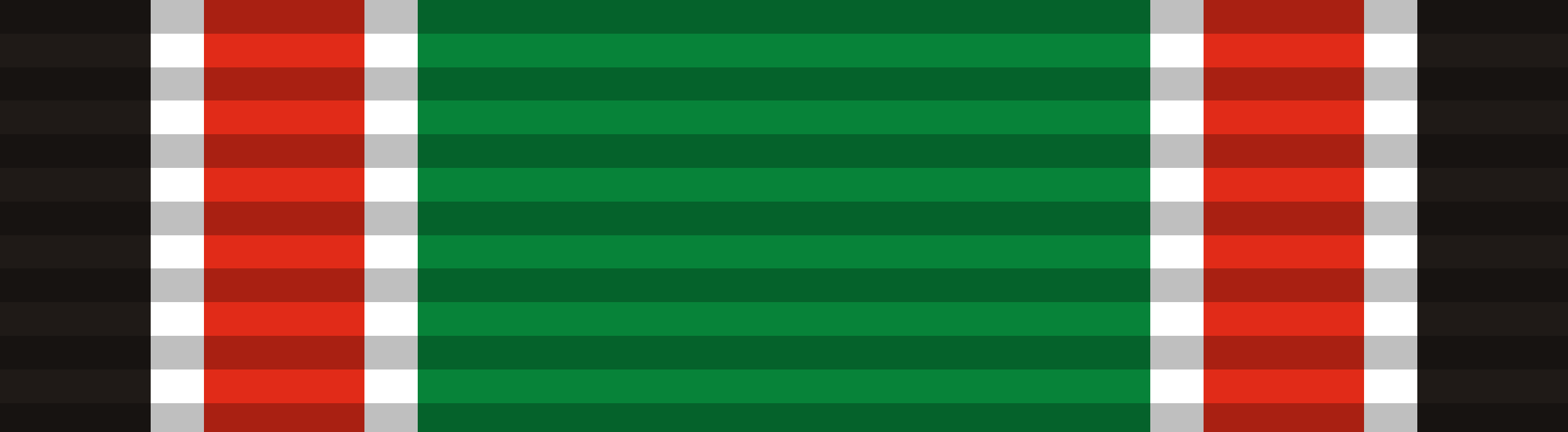

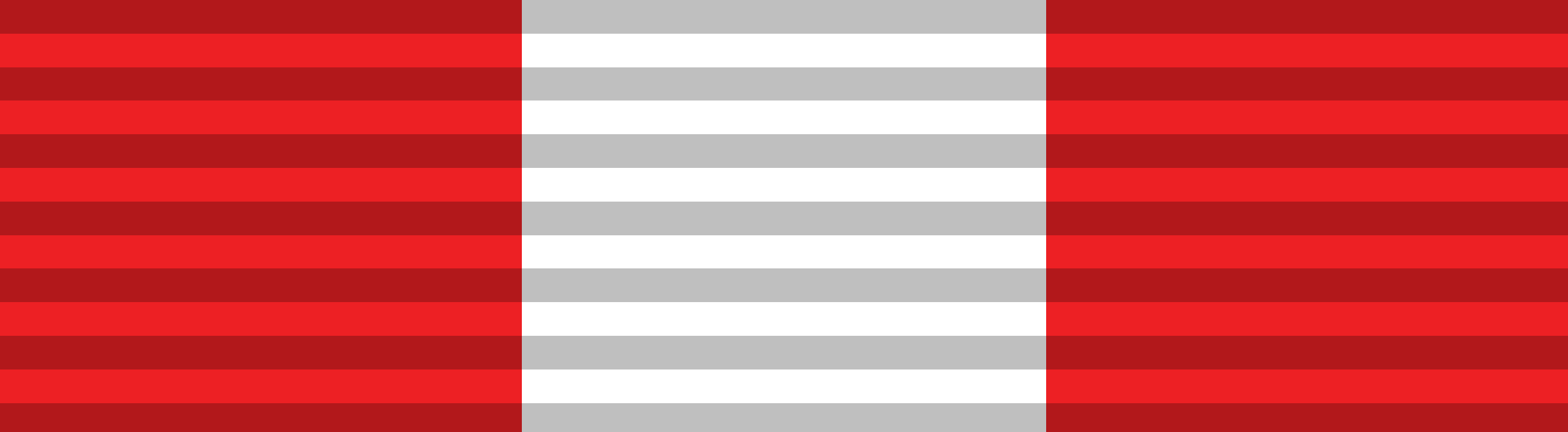

Nishan-e-Imtiaz (Military) (Order of Excellence)	Hilal-e-Imtiaz (Military) (Crescent of Excellence)	Tamgha-e-Basalat (Medal of Bravery)	Sitara-e-Harb 1965 War (War Star 1965)
Sitara-e-Harb 1971 War (War Star 1971)	Tamgha-e-Jang 1965 War (War Medal 1965)	Tamgha-e-Jang 1971 War (War Medal 1971)	Tamgha-e-Baqa (Nuclear Test Medal) 1998
10 Years Service Medal	20 Years Service Medal	30 Years Service Medal	Tamgha-e-Sad Saala Jashan-e- Wiladat-e-Quaid-e-Azam (100th Birth Anniversary of Muhammad Ali Jinnah) 1976
Hijri Tamgha (Hijri Medal) 1979	Jamhuriat Tamgha (Democracy Medal) 1988	Qarardad-e-Pakistan Tamgha (Resolution Day Golden Jubilee Medal) 1990	Tamgha-e-Salgirah Pakistan (Independence Day Golden Jubilee Medal) 1997
Order of King Abdul Aziz (1st Class) (Saudi Arabia)	The Order of Military Merit (Grand Cordon) (Jordan)	Turkish Legion of Merit (Turkey)	The Legion of Merit (Degree of Commander) (USA)

=== Foreign decorations ===
Foreign Awards
Saudi Arabia	Order of King Abdul Aziz (1st Class)
Jordan	The Order of Military Merit (Grand Cordon)
Turkey	The Legion of Merit Turkey
USA	The Legion of Merit (Degree of Commander)

== See also ==
- Civilian control of the military

Military offices
Preceded by Farrakh Khan	Chief of General Staff; 1994–1996	Succeeded by Iftikhar Ali Khan
Preceded by Abdul Waheed Kakar	Chief of Army Staff; 1996–1998	Succeeded by Pervez Musharraf
Preceded by Farooq Feroze Khan	Chairman Joint Chiefs of Staff Committee; 1997–1998	Succeeded by Pervez Musharraf
Diplomatic posts
Preceded by Ashraf Jehangir Qazi	Pakistan Ambassador to the United States; 2004–2006	Succeeded by Mahmud Ali Durrani
