= Muhammad Saeed Khan =

Pakistani Islamic scholar

Mufti Muhammad Saeed Khan

Personal life
- Known for: Participation in 1995 Pakistani coup d'état attempt
- Occupation: Islamic scholar, teacher

Religious life
- Religion: Islam
- Denomination: Sunni
- Jurisprudence: Hanafi
- Movement: Deobandi

Muhammad Saeed Khan (Urdu: محمد سعید خان) is a Pakistani Islamic scholar belonging to the Deobandi movement within Sunni Islam, who is the founder of Al-Nadwah Educational Trust in Islamabad, Pakistan. Khan also famously participated in the 1995 Pakistani coup d'état attempt.

According to BBC Urdu, "Mustansir Billah had given him certain documents to destroy, which the army authorities later recovered from him including a copy of the speech which was to be delivered by Zaheerul Islam Abbasi after taking over the power of the country.

== Life and works ==
Khan is the founder of Al-Nadwah Educational Trust, in Islamabad, Pakistan. He edited the journals Al-Nadwah and Al-Manad and then served as the editor of Al-Hamid, a monthly journal published by the Jamia Madaniyah in Lahore. He has taught Quranic exegesis and Islamic sciences at Wayne State University, the Islamic Center of Irving, and the National University of Computer and Emerging Sciences.

Khan participated in the 1995 Pakistani coup d'état attempt and has been seen as a controversial figure within the religious circles since then. He regularly gave discourses at some of the garrison sessions and was encouraged by the then commander of X Corps. He was arrested from Rawalpindi at that time and was jailed for his activities during this operation.

An article by Aezaz Syed on BBC Urdu states that, "Mustansir Billah had given him certain documents to destroy and later the army authorities also recovered from Mufti Saeed a copy of the speech which was to be delivered by Major General Zaheerul Islam Abbasi after taking over the power of the country. Mufti Saeed was the only person with these military officers who was aware of every issue." Khan is known to have prepared this speech for Abbasi.

In January 2023, he was a described as a member of the core-committee of Pakistan Tehreek-e-Insaf. Khan solemnized the marriage ceremony of Imran Khan with Bushra Bibi.

== Reception ==
Khan has been criticized about his theory regarding the establishment of Darul Uloom Deoband. He was attributed with a statement mentioning that the establishment of Deoband seminary was done with support from the British India government and that the government had given a plot to the seminary's founder. (Note: This has also been discussed in the April–June 2011 issue of Tarjumaan Darul Uloom.) Khan issued a clarification in his book stating that, "In any private conversation, there is a possibility of mistakes in the four stages: speaking, listening and understanding and then drawing conclusions from this conversation. If my discussion about the first construction of Darul Uloom Deoband gives an impression that the seminary received a favor of the British government, not only that I completely deny this impression, but those who have got hurt due to this impression; I seek forgiveness from them and from Allah Ta'ala as well. After this explanation, I hope that the scholars will not be mistaken."

Khan and his organization Al Nadwa Educational Trust have been sued in the State of Texas for Fraud. The suit seeks damages wherein Mufti Saeed thru, Madani Memorial Inc., a Michigan-based non-profit that has raised funds in the United States and wire transferred the same to Mufti Saeed are accused of fraudulently taking over $250,000 from YPS Foundation. The principals of each organization are also defendants in the complaint.
