= Resignation of Jehangir Karamat =

Pakistani political and military controversy

On 6 October 1998, Prime Minister of Pakistan Nawaz Sharif relieved General Jehangir Karamat who was simultaneously serving as CJCSC and COAS from the command of the Pakistan Armed Forces for making public statements regarding and contradicting the policies of public administration. In public and political science circles, General Karamat had popular support and occupied a prestigious image in the country for his role to promote a democratic process in the country. His dismissal remains a controversial topic in the field of civil-military relations and the move remains still questionable at the political science circles of Pakistan.

A war veteran of Indo-Pakistani wars and former professor of political science at the National Defence University (NDU), General Karamat was an apolitical and professional military leader, but confrontation involving the Fourteenth Amendment and matters of principle of civilian control of the military was ingrained, which eventually led the relieving of General Jehangir Karamat from his command of the military by Prime Minister Nawaz Sharif in October 1998.

== Background ==
=== Nawaz Sharif ===
As scheduled, the general elections were held on 3 February 1997, which marked the return of Nawaz Sharif with an exclusive, two-thirds majority in the Parliament. Just after days of re-electing for his second term, Prime Minister Sharif faced serious constitutional crises with the Supreme Court and the Presidency on the other side. Nawaz Sharif made very important Constitutional Amendments that inserted in the Constitution which introduced termination of the Eighth Amendment and passing of the Thirteenth Amendment, with the enaction of the anti-corruption bill in 1997.

Sharif's constitutional moves were challenged by the Chief Justice Sajjad Ali Shah and President Farooq Leghari; both were forced to resign by Nawaz Sharif on 2 December 1997. After Sharif ordering the nuclear tests in 1998 and his unsuccessful attempt to pass the Fifteenth Amendment, a number of military officers publicly disagreed with the administration's policy over administration. This confrontation led to the resignation of General Jehangir Karamat on 7 October 1998. General Karamat was replaced by General Pervez Musharraf.

=== Jehangir Karamat ===
In stature and seniority, General Karamat was a foremost army generals in the Pakistan Military. A son of civil servant and a highly decorated war veteran of Indo-Pakistani wars, Karamat was an academic who graduated with a top of his PMA Kakul class of 1961 and later fully tenured as professor of political science at the National Defence University (NDU) during most of the 1970s and 1980s.

Karamat was a recipient of Pakistan's highest military and civilian honours as well as occupied a good image in country's public circles. He had a distinguish combat career, and many of his students at NDU would ascended in prestigious combat assignments in the country's military science circles. In 1995, Karamat gained national publicity after thwarting the conspiracy against Prime minister Benazir Bhutto, and his credentials would lead to him to be appointed simultaneously to four-star assignments, Chief of Army Staff and Chairman Joint Chiefs of Staff Committee by Benazir Bhutto.

== Events leading up to the relief ==
=== Problems with Supreme Court and Presidency ===
The conservative mass led by Prime Minister Nawaz Sharif had come to the power with a two-majority as a result of 1997 general elections. Sharif established the Anti Terrorism Courts (ATC), Anti-Corruption Bill and passed the Fourteenth Amendment to the constitution, in 1997. After criticizing the Chief Justice, the Supreme Court of Pakistan summoned Nawaz Sharif in Contempt of court and he appeared to court with party workers, members, chief ministers, and constituents to hear the proceedings. Unruly party workers stormed into the Supreme Court, forcing Chief Justice Sajjad Ali Shah to remove the finding of contempt against PM Nawaz Sharif. Hundreds of PML-N supporters and members of its youth wing, the Muslim Students Front (MSF), breached the police barrier around the courthouse when defence lawyer S.M. Zafar was arguing Sharif's case. The partisans invaded the supreme court premises and intimated the senior judges at the supreme court; all of this actions were recorded in security cameras and television channels broadcast the event nationwide.

Chief Justice Shah wrote a letter to President Farooq Leghari to call the Pakistan Armed Forces to take action against Sharif. However, the constant pressure of Farooq Leghari deteriorated his health which led to his resignation from the presidency. Chief Justice Shah's tenured was cut short when Sharif appointed Justice Saeeduzzaman Siddiqui in his place and his appointment was approved by the new president; Shah also resigned from the Supreme Court after hearing the news on television channels.

=== Public statements and relief ===
After the nuclear tests in 1998, a Defence Committee of the Cabinet (DCC) session was chaired with the Chairman and Chiefs of armed forces to overview the situation with India. Problems arose with chairman joint chiefs and chief of army staff general Karamat in October 1998.

While addressing the naval officers and cadets at the Naval War College, General Karamat stressed the re-creation of National Security Council (instead of DCC) which would be backed by a "team of civil-military experts" for devising policies to seek resolution ongoing problems relating the civil-military issues; also recommended a "neutral but competent bureaucracy and administration of at federal level and the establishment of Local governments in four provinces.

This proposal was met with hostility and it succeeded all in accomplishing was pricking the Prime minister's highly inflated altered ego. Nawaz Sharif's dismissal of general Karamat, plummeted his mandate in the public circles and criticism he received from Leader of the Opposition Benazir Bhutto was rogue.

Sharif summoned the Chairman Joint Chiefs and notified him of his relieving from the service. On 6 October 1998, Nawaz Sharif dismissed and signed the relieving papers which were effective immediately. Many in Pakistan became surprised of Sharif's moved since the dismissal of four-star general was never happened before in country's short history.

== Aftermath ==
=== Response and fallout ===
With Karamat's dismissal, it was widely felt in the armed forces that Sharif had ruthlessly established his control all over the country, including the military. The dismissal of General Karamat was least popular decision in Sharif's prime ministerial ship, and his approval ratings plummeted. Media Minister Syed Mushahid Hussain and later Prime minister himself justified his actions on national and international media:

In a democratic society, would a Chief of Army Staff and chairman Joint Chiefs talk about the Government like that? What happened to General MacArthur? Mr. Harry Truman did not waste much time. Pakistan is finally becoming a normal democratic society.

— Mushahid Hussain, Media Minister in Nawaz Government,

The relieve of General Karamat was a heated issue discussed even by his senior government ministers. The most-senior and the former Treasury minister Sartaj Aziz gave vehement criticism and showed opposition to the Prime minister for making this move.

Writing a thesis in his book, Between Dreams and Realities: Some Milestones in Pakistan's History, Aziz maintained: "Blunder of firing of General Karamatt; others will blame Nawaz Sharif for many mistakes he made. But in my view, the most serious of these mistakes was Nawaz Sharif's decision to remove General Jehangir Karamat as chief of army staff in October 1998". Aziz was extremely confident and certain that Chief of General Staff Lieutenant-General Ali Kuli Khan would be appointed as the Chief of Army Staff based on his seniority, merit, among a very competent officer, and next in seniority to General Karamat.

It came to the conclusion that in relieving General Jehangir Karamat, Prime minister Sharif had committed a "blunder". He also failed to recognize that despite his heavy mandate, it was not advisable for him to dismiss two army chiefs in less than a year. In doing so he had overplayed his hands and effectively derailed the democratic process for nine long year...

— Sartaj Aziz, 2009

In 1999, Nawaz Sharif later dismissed Chief of Naval Staff Admiral Fasih Bokhari to promote General Musharraf to chairman joint chiefs. The following month, a failed attempt to dismiss Musharraf led to a military coup d'état against Prime minister Nawaz Sharif in 1999.

== Readings and books ==
- Aziz, Mazhar (2008). Military control in Pakistan: the parallel state. London: Routledge. ISBN 978-0-415-43743-1.
- Riedel, Bruce (2010). Deadly embrace : Pakistan, America, and the future of the global jihad. Washington, D.C.: Brookings Institution Press. ISBN 978-0-8157-0557-4.
