= National Intelligence Coordination Committee (Pakistan) =

Pakistani intelligence liaison agency

- State emblem of Pakistan

Intelligence agency overview
- Formed: 24 November 2020; 5 years ago
- Headquarters: Islamabad, Pakistan
- Intelligence agency executive: Lt. Gen. Nadeem Anjum, Director-General of ISI

The National Intelligence Coordination Committee (NICC) of Pakistan is headed by the Director General of Inter-Services Intelligence. The overarching intelligence coordination body was given assent by the Prime Minister of Pakistan Imran Khan in November 2020. It held its inaugural session on June 24, 2021, marking the date the committee became functional.

== Background ==
The Abbottabad Commission had recommended that a mechanism to integrate civil and military intelligence be set up. On November 24, 2020, Prime Minister Imran Khan approved the creation of the committee. On June 24, 2021, the body held its inaugural session at the Inter-Services Intelligence's headquarters. The meeting was presided over by Prime Minister Imran Khan and attended by Interior Minister Sheikh Rashid Ahmed, Information Minister Fawad Chaudhry, and the heads of the services’ intelligence agencies, including the Intelligence Bureau and the Federal Investigation Agency.

== Constituents ==
Over two dozen intelligence organizations will coordinate under the NICC including:

- Inter-Services Intelligence
- Intelligence Bureau
- Federal Investigation Agency
- Defence Intelligence:
  - Air Intelligence
  - Military Intelligence
  - Naval Intelligence
- Civil Armed Forces:
  - Pakistan Rangers
    - Punjab Rangers Intelligence Wing
    - Sindh Rangers Intelligence Wing
  - Frontier Corps
    - Field Intelligence Units Frontier Corps (South Khyber Pakhtunkhwa)
    - Field Intelligence Units Frontier Corps (North Khyber Pakhtunkhwa)
    - Field Intelligence Units Frontier Corps (South Balochistan)
    - Field Intelligence Units Frontier Corps (North Balochistan)
  - Pakistan Coast Guard
    - PCG Intelligence Wing
  - Gilgit Baltistan Scouts
    - GB Scouts Field Intelligence
  - Frontier Constabulary
    - Frontier Constabulary Intelligence
- National Counter Terrorism Authority
- Pakistan Police:
  - Special Branch
  - Counter Terrorism Departments
    - CTD Punjab
    - CTD Khyber Pakhtunkhwa
    - CTD Sindh
    - CTD Balochistan
- Anti Narcotics Force
  - ANF Intelligence Branch
- National Accountability Bureau
- Financial Monitoring Unit
- Directorate General of Intelligence and Investigation
- Directorate-General of Intelligence, Strategic Plans Division.

== Current leadership ==
Permanent members
Designation	Incumbent	Service/Department
Convener	Nadeem Anjum	ISI
Secretary	Fuad Asadullah	IB
Member	Wajid Aziz Khan	MI
Member	Shakil Ghaznafar	AI
Member	Abdul Munib	NI
Member	Mohsin Butt	FIA
Member	Rai Muhammad Tahir	NACTA

== See also ==
- List of intelligence agencies
- Pakistani Intelligence community
