= Abdul Waheed Kakar =

Pakistani general and 5th Chief of Army Staff (1937–2026)

Abdul Waheed Kakar NI(M) HI(M) SBt
- عبد الوحید کاکڑ
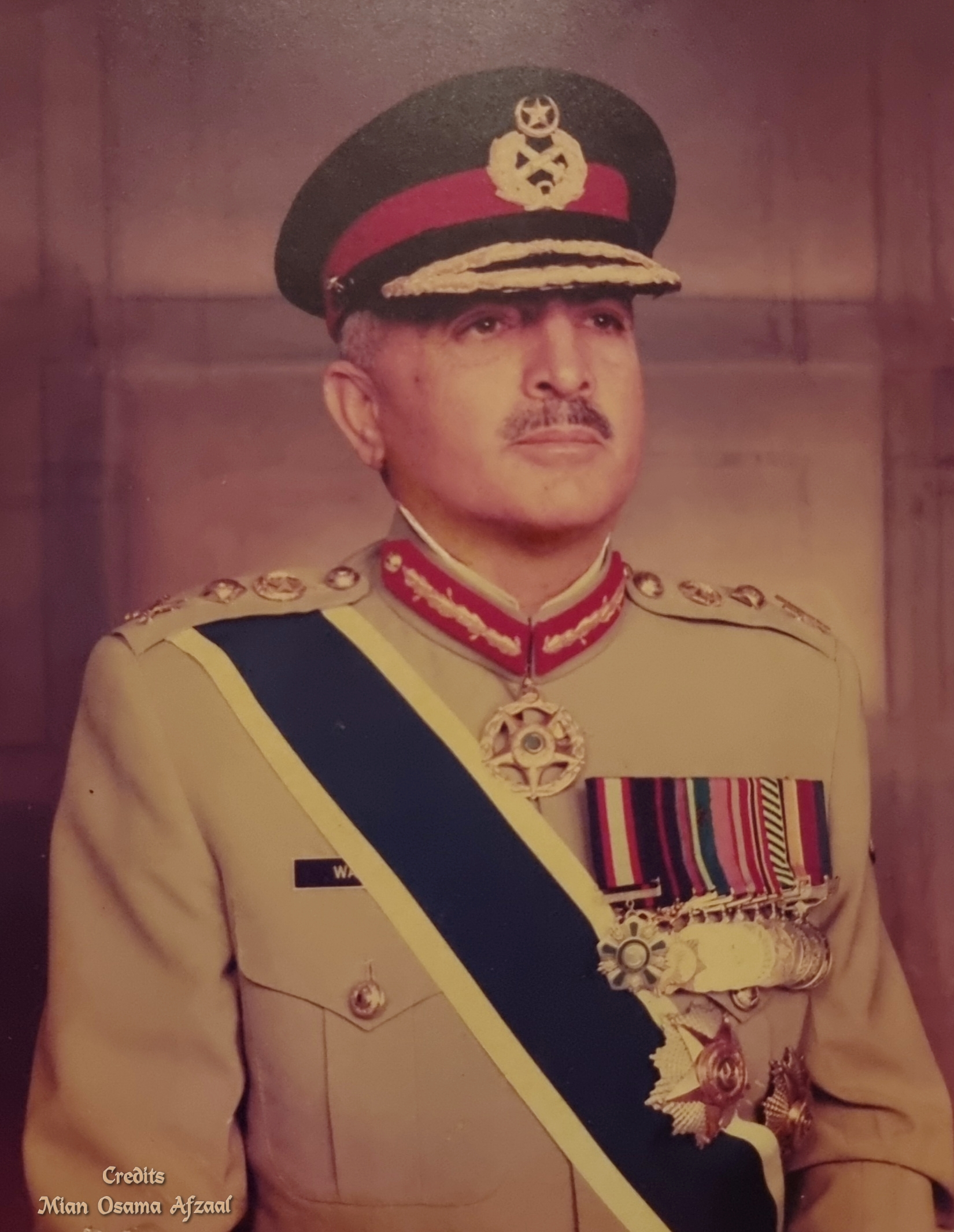
- Official Portrait as 5th Chief of Army Staff
- Born: 23 March 1937; Quetta, Baluchistan Agency, British India
- Died: 26 October 2026 (aged 89); Rawalpindi, Punjab, Pakistan
- Military career
- Branch: Pakistan Army
- Service years: 1956–1996
- Rank: General
- Units: 3rd Frontier Force Regiment; 5th Frontier Force Regiment; 27th Azad Kashmir Regiment
- Commands: Chief of Army Staff; XII Corps; Adjutant General, Army GHQ; 16th Infantry Division; 27th Azad Kashmir Regiment
- Conflicts: India–Pakistan war of 1965; India–Pakistan war of 1971
- Awards: Nishan-e-Imtiaz (Military); Hilal-e-Imtiaz (Military); Sitara-e-Basalat; Order of Military Merit

Abdul Waheed Kakar (Note: Urdu: عبدالوحید کاکڑ) (23 March 1937 – 26 October 2026) was a senior military officer of the Pakistan Army who served as the fifth Chief of Army Staff, appointed by Prime Minister Nawaz Sharif on 12 January 1993 after the controversial death of his predecessor General Asif Nawaz Janjua. Upon the completion of his three-year tenure, Kakar retired in 1996.

Notably, Kakar superseded five senior high ranking army generals with more years of seniority. General Kakar oversaw the 1993 Pakistani general election upon securing the resignations of President Ghulam Ishaq Khan and Prime Minister Nawaz Sharif to resolve a constitutional crisis that year.

== Background ==
Abdul Waheed Kakar was born into a Pashtun family of the Abdullah Zai (Male Zai), in the Shahābzai Kakar tribe village of Zhob, Baluchistan Agency in British India (now Pakistan) on 23 March 1937. His tribe, Kakar, originally hailed from Zhob, and was fluent in Pashto. His family later migrated to North and eventually found a way to be settled in Peshawar.

His uncle, Abdur Rab Nishtar, was listed as one of the founding fathers of Pakistan who would later serve as the Governor of Punjab as well as serving as the President of Pakistan Muslim League. After graduating from local high school in 1955, Kakar went to attend the Edwardes College where he secured his graduation. He joined the Pakistan Army in 1956, and was directed to attend the Pakistan Military Academy in Kakul where he was expected to pass out from the academy in 1958 but was held back for a 6-month term. Eventually, Waheed gained commission in the Frontier Force Regiment in 1959 as a 2nd-Lt.

His combat duty witnessed the military actions in Chawinda in Sialkot, against the Indian Army during the conflict with India in 1965. In 1971, Major Kakar served as the brigade major of an independent infantry stationed at the Sulemanki sector, and fought against the Indian Army. His combat duty during the actions of both wars served his reputation as did scenes of major battles in the respective wars.

After the war, Major Kakar was selected to attend the Command and Staff College in Canada, where he stood first in the examinations and qualified as a psc. He was later selected to attend a staff course program. Upon returning from Canada, he continued his education when he was selected to attend the National Defence University (NDU) where he studied and attained graduation in War studies degree at the Armed Forces War College of the NDU. He commanded 27 Azad Kashmir Regiment as Lieutenant Colonel in Azad Kashmir region before war studies.

In 1976–78, Brig. Kakar was appointed Chief of Staff of the II Corps, stationed in Multan, commanded by then-Lieutenant-General Rahimuddin Khan.

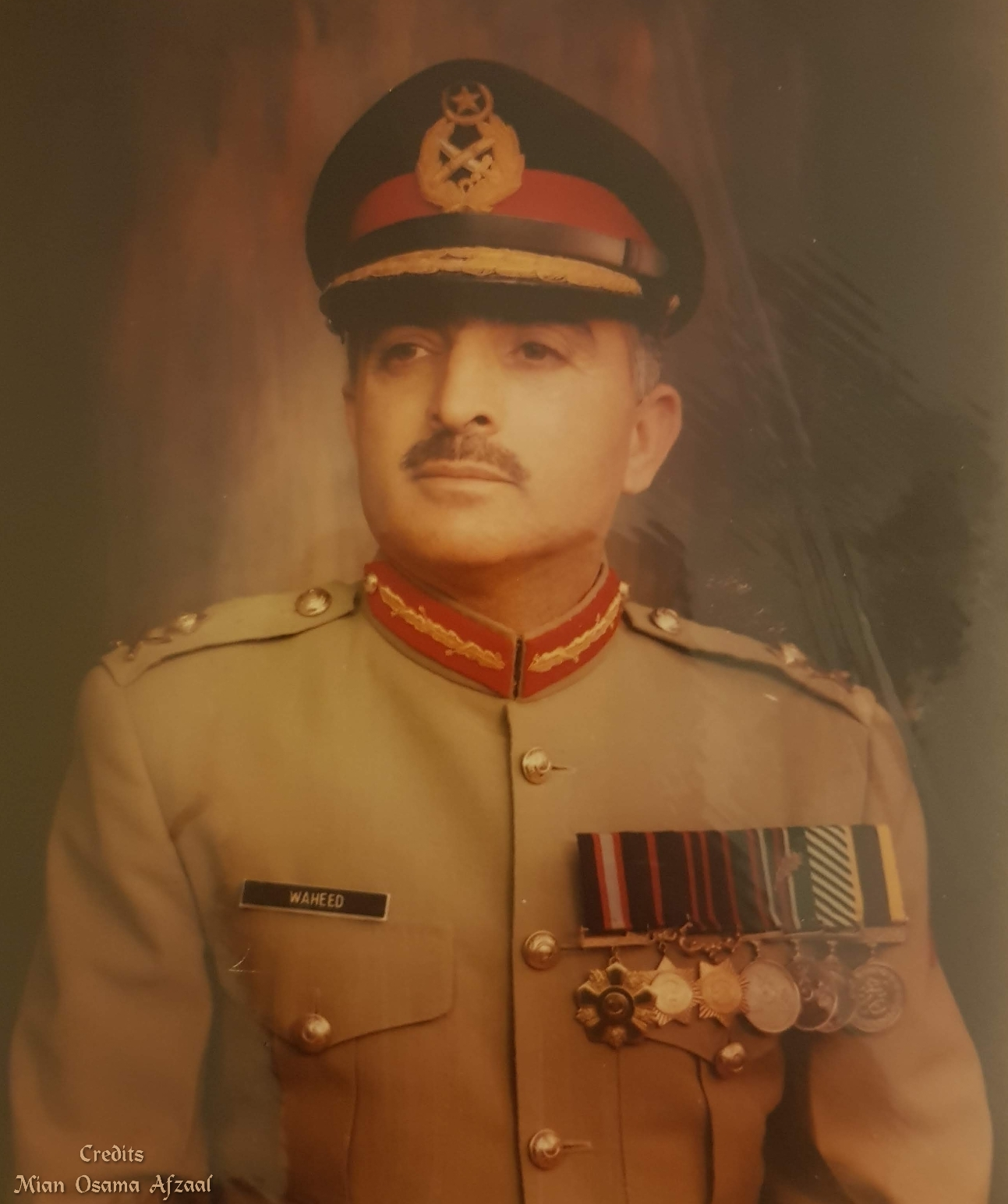
Portrait of General Abdul Waheed Kakar as the 5th Chief of Army Staff of the Pakistan Army

In 1984, Major-General Kakar was subsequently given the command of the 16th Infantry Division in Quetta as its GOC. In 1987–89, Kakar was appointed an Adjutant-General at the Army GHQ. At the time he was ordered to admit three students in the Army Medical College but he refused despite direct orders from the President General Muhammad Zia-ul-Haq, as they did not meet the minimum criteria. The President then ordered the increase of overall seats from 60 to 100. In 1989, Lieutenant-General Kakar was posted as field commander of the XII Corps, stationed in Quetta.

== Chief of Army Staff ==
In summer of 1993, the MoD announced the names of retiring army generals who were due retirement, and such list included Lt-Gen. Kakar as he was also seeking the retirement.

Without consulting Prime Minister Nawaz Sharif, President Ghulam Ishaq Khan nominated and approved the appointment papers of junior-most Lt-Gen. Kakar to the promotion of senior four-star rank when elevating him as the Chief of Army Staff (COAS).

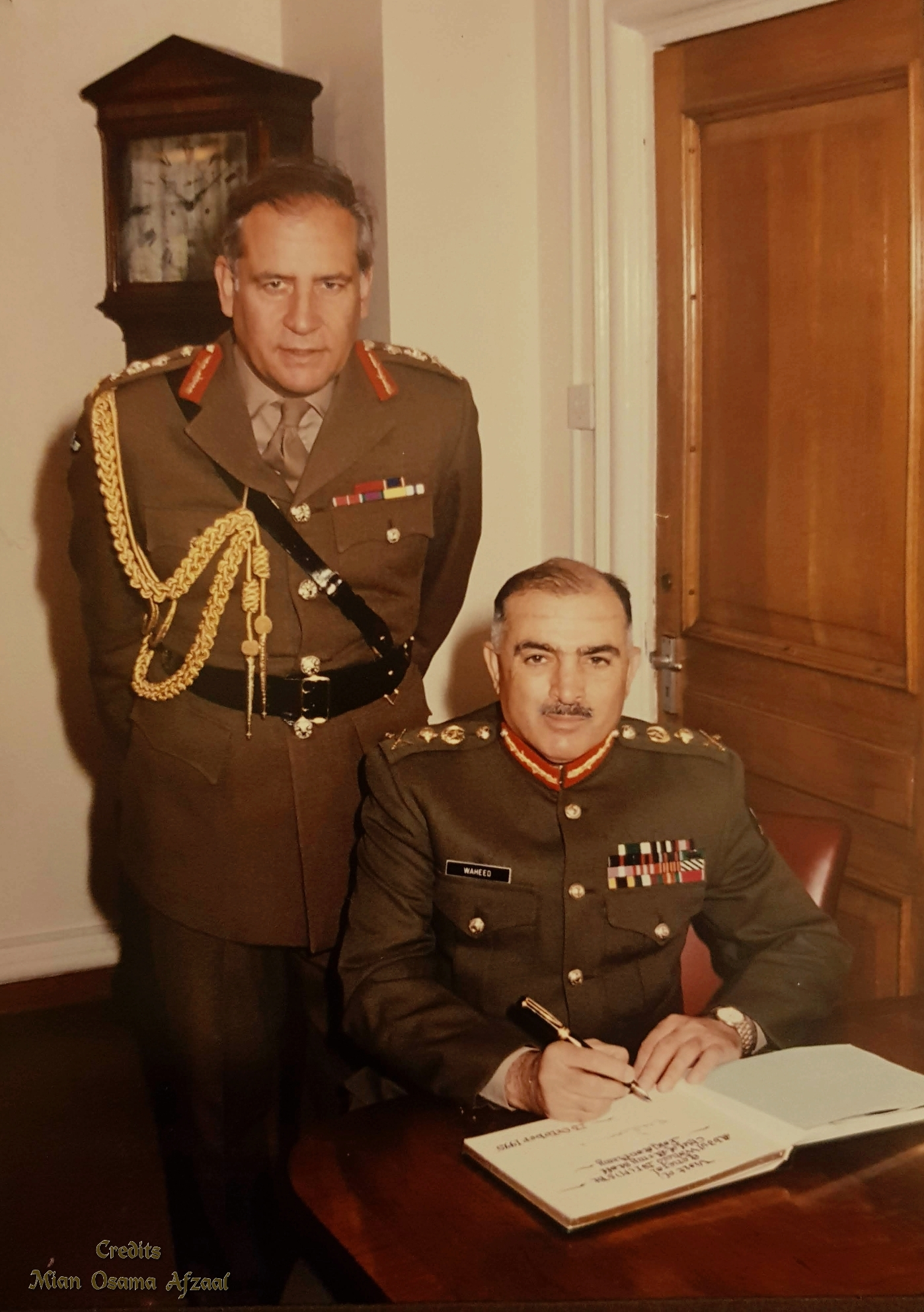
An Image of General Abdul Waheed Kakar (Head of Pakistan Army) with Field Marshal Sir Charles Guthrie (Head of The British Army) in Great Britain.

The appointment was controversial due to Kakar superseding six senior army generals, including:

  - Lieutenant-General Farrakh Khan, Chief of General Staff (CGS) at Army GHQ in Rawalpindi.
  - Lieutenant-General Javed Nasir, Director-General of the Inter-Services Intelligence (DG ISI).
  - Lieutenant-General Mohammad Ashraf, Field Commander, IV Corps in Lahore.
  - Lieutenant General Hamid Niaz on secondment to Mari Gas Corporation Limited.
  - Lieutenant-General Arif Bangash, Quartermaster General (QMG) at Army GHQ in Rawalpindi.
  - Lieutenant-General Rehem Dil Bhatti, President of National Defence University (NDU).

Among these listed army generals, the CGS, the QMG, and the DG ISI, opted to stay to serve on their assignments despite being overlooked for the promotions.

After his appointment, a member of the National Assembly who belonged to PMPA was quoted: "the era of the Pakhtoons has begun. The president belonged to the Frontier province and so did the new Chief of Army Staff."

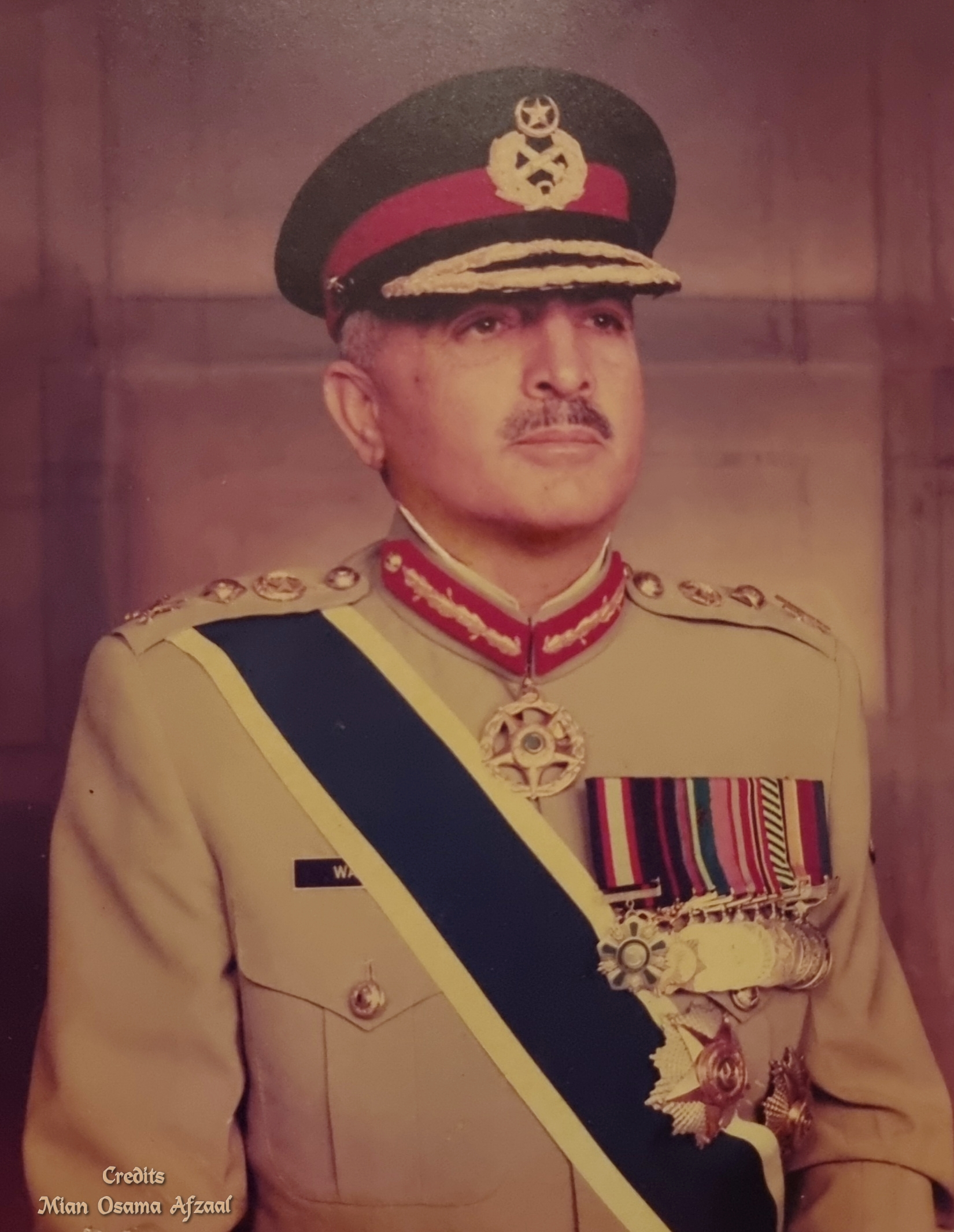
Portrait of General Abdul Waheed Kakar 5th COAS Pak Army

After assuming the command of the army as its Chief of Army Staff and contrary to the expectations of President Ghulam Ishaq, General Kakar played a decisive role in resolving the constitutional crises by securing the resignation of President Ghulam Ishaq and later Prime Minister Sharif in 1993. This act allowed holding national General Elections which witnessed the return of Pakistan Peoples Party (PPP) led by Benazir Bhutto, who eventually became the Prime Minister of Pakistan. During his tenure, General Kakar was instrumental in securing the government funding for the Shaheen project developed under the PAEC's scientists.

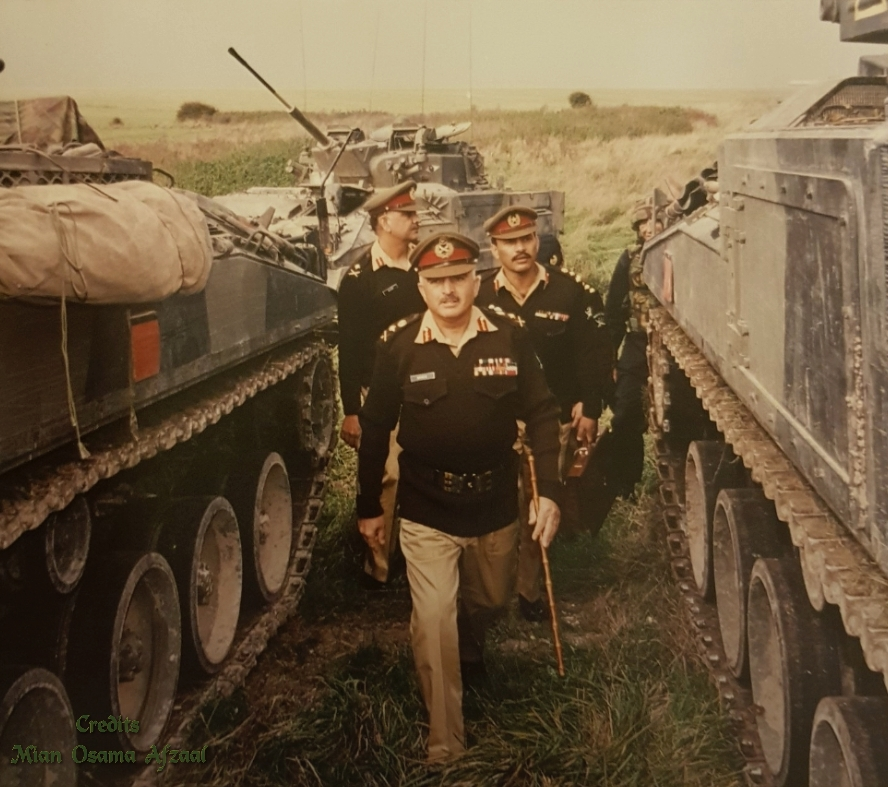
General Abdul Waheed Kakar 5th COAS Pak Army In The Field With Tanks On Both Sides

In September 1995, General Kakar played a crucial role in sustaining democracy by having discovered a plot by a group of army officers headed by Major-General Zahirul Islam Abbasi, acting in complicity with the Harkat-ul-Jihad-al-Islami a militant group, to assassinate him and Bhutto, to capture power. This plan was foiled by the Military Intelligence and the Military Police who initiated the operation to have those involved captured and arrested.

In 1996, Kakar reportedly declined the extension of his service and there was no public statement on the matter. After his retirement, he never appeared in public and lived a very quiet life in Rawalpindi.

== Reception ==
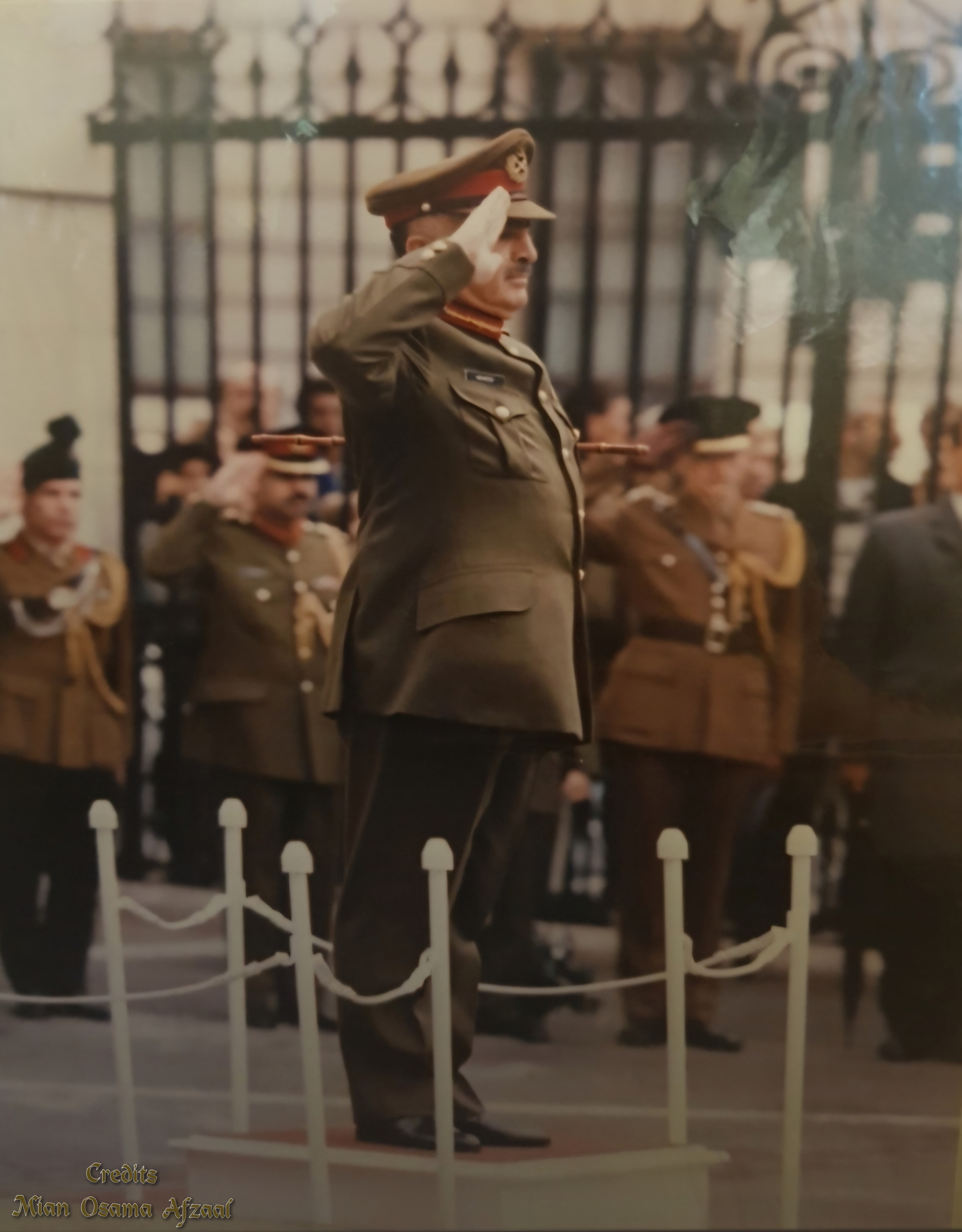
An image of General Abdul Waheed Kakar during his tenure as 5th Chief of Army Staff

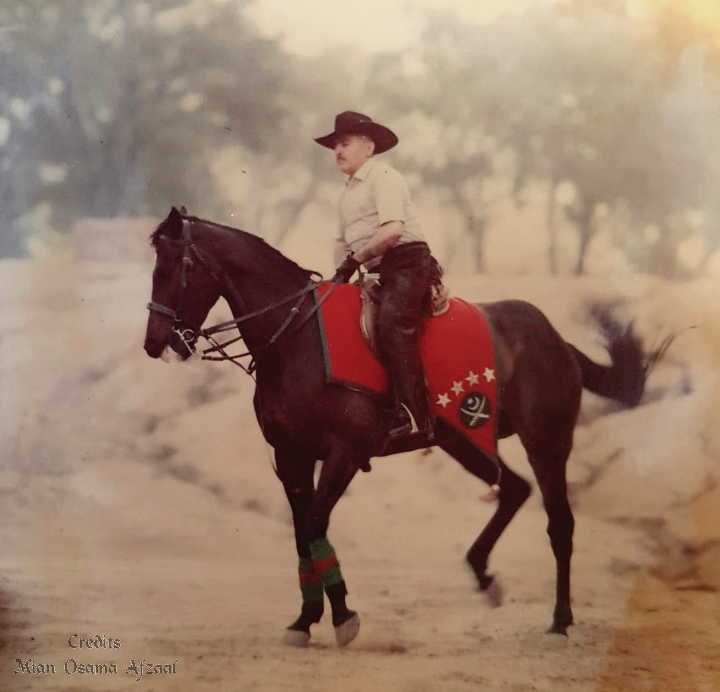
General Kakar riding a black stallion

General Kakar was perceived as an imposing man with a robust personality that brokered no nonsense. In the military, he was popular among his colleagues as a flamboyant rider and a mountaineer.

His reception as an army chief was hailed and celebrated by the Pashtuns nationalists when Mahmood Achakzai, then-MNA, reportedly remarked in the news media in 1993: "This is not a General from the Sandhurst colonial brand. I welcome an enlightened man from the rigid mountain ranges of Loralai. He has the professional skills for improving the war performance of the Pakistan Army. But more than that, he is intelligent enough to comprehend politics and will promote the democratic process. General Waheed is not a religious extremist."

Published writer/author Ikram Sehgal mentioned the following in his article for Bol News, "Emulating The Kakar Model": Can the Army itself avoid its prime responsibility to confront any development endangering national security by remaining aloof from politics? The so-called "Bangladesh model" created by the then Bangladesh COAS Gen Moeen U Ahmed on June 11, 2007, was totally modelled on General Waheed Kakar's 1993 model where not one single soldier went into civilian administration. Rescuing the political process from sliding the country into anarchy kept the army out of politics and the civil administration.

In July 1993, the then COAS of the Pakistan Army, General Abdul Waheed Kakar calmly and peacefully oversaw the resignations of both the President Ghulam Ishaq Khan and Prime Minister Nawaz Sharif who both were endangering national security by creating conditions that could have led to civil war. Instead of taking over power himself, the then COAS moved the Chairman Senate Waseem Sajjad constitutionally upwards to be the interim President and formed an interim government of capable technocrats, retired bureaucrats and ex-servicemen to successfully govern and oversee free and fair elections.

While the "Kakar Model" went beyond what the 90 days the Constitution allows, no one ever challenged the move, because it was done in good faith. Such was the respect for General Kakar and the Pakistan Army.

== Death ==
Kakar died in Rawalpindi on 26 October 2026, at the age of 89. His funeral took place at Army Race Course Ground, Rawalpindi. His Janaza was attended by Pakistan’s Prime Minister Shehbaz Sharif, Deputy Prime Minister Ishaq Dar, Defence Minister Khawaja Asif, Commander of National Strategic Command Syed Aamer Raza. Many former army chiefs and chairman joint chiefs of staff committee alongwith serving and retired military and civilian officials also attended the Janaza.

== Awards and decorations ==

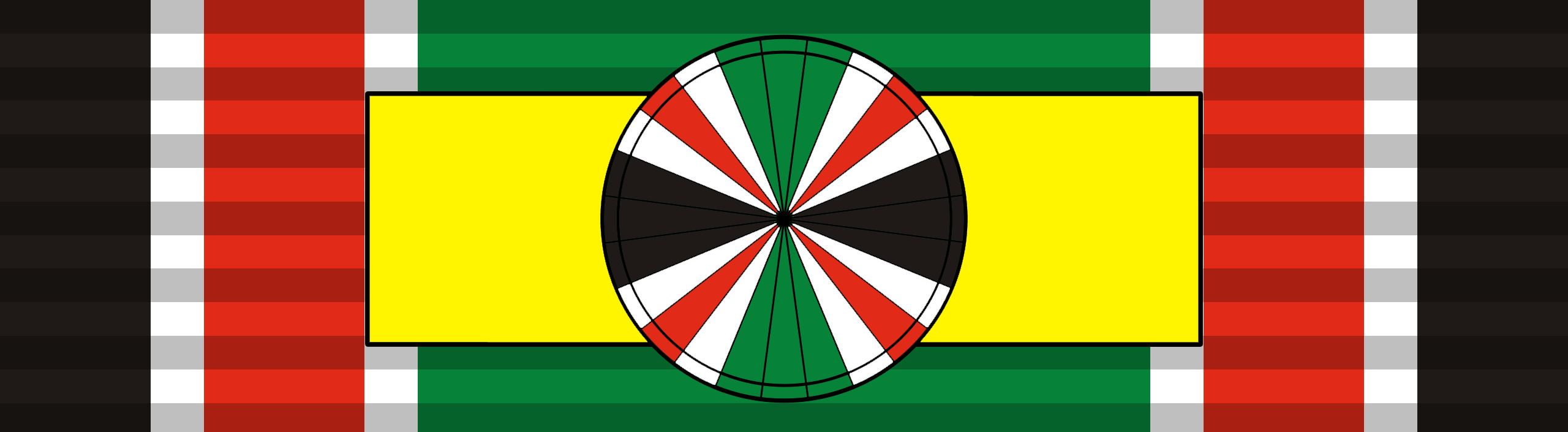

Nishan-e-Imtiaz (Military) (Order of Excellence)	Hilal-i-Imtiaz (Military) (Crescent of Excellence)		Sitara-e-Basalat (Star of Valour)
Sitara-e-Harb 1965 War (War Star 1965)	Sitara-e-Harb 1971 War (War Star 1971)	Tamgha-e-Jang 1965 War (War Medal 1965)	Tamgha-e-Jang 1971 War (War Medal 1971)
10 Years Service Medal	20 Years Service Medal	30 Years Service Medal	Tamgha-e-Sad Saala Jashan-e-Wiladat-e-Quaid-e-Azam (100th Birth Anniversary of Muhammad Ali Jinnah) 1976
Hijri Tamgha (Hijri Medal) 1979	Tamgha-e-Jamhuriat (Democracy Medal) 1988	Qarardad-e-Pakistan Tamgha (Resolution Day Golden Jubilee Medal) 1990	Order of Military Merit Grand Cordon (Jordan)

=== Foreign Decorations ===
Foreign Awards
Jordan	The Order of Military Merit

== See also ==
- Civilian control of the military

== Notes ==
Military offices
Preceded by Asif Nawaz	Chief of Army Staff; 1993–1996	Succeeded by Jehangir Karamat
