= Shahid Akhtar Alvi =

Pakistani retired air force officer

Ambassador of Pakistan to Syria
- Incumbent
- Assumed office 5 December 2022

Personal details
- Born: September 5, 1964 (age 61)
- Awards: Hilal-i-Imtiaz (Military)

Military service
- Allegiance: Pakistan
- Branch/service: Pakistan Air Force
- Rank: Air marshal

Shahid Akhtar Alvi is a Pakistani retired air force officer who has served as the Ambassador of Pakistan to Syria since 2022. He was commissioned in November 1984 in the GD (P) Branch and later held senior appointments including Air Officer Commanding, Northern Air Command, Director General Air Intelligence, and Deputy Chief of the Air Staff for Training.

== Early life and education ==
Alvi was born on 5 September 1964. He is a graduate of the Combat Commanders' School, the Air War College and the National Defence University, and holds master's degrees in strategic studies and defence and strategic studies.

== Military career ==
Alvi was commissioned in the GD (P) Branch of the Pakistan Air Force in November 1984. During his career, he commanded a fighter squadron, an operational air base and a regional air command. In staff appointments, he served as Deputy Inspector General of the IG Branch, Senior Air Staff Officer at Air Defence Command, Assistant Chief of the Air Staff (Security), and Director General Air Intelligence. He also served as air attaché to India.

In July 2017, he was promoted from air vice marshal to air marshal. By October 2018, he was serving as Deputy Chief of the Air Staff for Training. He also served as Air Officer Commanding, Northern Air Command.

== Diplomatic career ==
On 28 September 2022, Alvi called on President Arif Alvi as Pakistan's ambassador-designate to Syria. On 5 December 2022, President Bashar al-Assad accepted his credentials as ambassador extraordinary and plenipotentiary of Pakistan to Syria.

As ambassador, Alvi has represented Pakistan in bilateral and humanitarian activities in Syria. In November 2024, he received Pakistan's 21st humanitarian aid consignment in Damascus for war-affected people of Palestine and Lebanon.
