= Farrakh Khan =

Pakistani general (1938–2016)

- Farrakh Khan (1938–2016)
- Born: Farrakh Khan; 12 December 1938; Attock, Punjab, India (Present-day in Punjab, Pakistan)
- Died: 25 June 2016 (aged 77); CMH Rawalpindi, Punjab, Pakistan
- Burial place: Westridge Cemetery
- Military career
- Allegiance: Pakistan
- Branch: Pakistan Army
- Service years: 1954–1994
- Rank: Lieutenant-General
- Nickname: Man of Steel
- Units: 15th Lancers, Armoured Corps
- Commands: Chief of General Staff; XI Corps, Peshawar; DG Pakistan Army Rangers; Military Secretary (Mil Secy); GOC 6th Armoured Division
- Conflicts: Indo-Pakistani War of 1965; Indo-Pakistani War of 1971; Operation Brasstacks
- Awards: Sitara-i-Imtiaz (military)

Farrakh Khan (12 December 1938 – 25 June 2016) was a three-star rank army general in the Pakistan Army who was notable for his tenureship as the Chief of General Staff (CGS) at the Army GHQ from 1991 to 1994.

== Biography ==
Farrakh Khan studied at Army Burn Hall College before joining the Pakistan Army in 1954, and entered the Pakistan Military Academy in Kakul in 1956 where he passed out of the class of 20th PMA Long Course in 1959, and gained commission in the 15th Lancers of the Armoured Corps. At the PMA, 2nd-Lt Khan was notable for his role as a peer leader among the military cadets, serving as their section leader.

He attended the Command and Staff College in Canada, and earned master's degree from the National Defence University in Islamabad.

During the war with India in 1965, Capt. Khan served as one of the commanding officers in the 24th Cavalry in Frontier Force Regiment. In the view of Mahmud Ali Durrani, the former NSA of Pakistan government, Capt. Khan was noted for his leadership in maintaining the performance of the tanks in the Armoured Corps and was quoted: "With an excellent commanding officer and sound senior officers, our Regiment 25 Cavalry was jelled into a highly professional force which proved its mettle in the 1965 war with India and earned the title of 'Men of Steel'." He later served in the Western front of the third war with India in 1971.

In 1984, Major-General Khan took over the command of the Army Rangers on Punjab section and served until 1985, when he was elevated as a military secretary at the Army GHQ in Rawalpindi. In 1985, Maj-Gen Khan was elevated as GOC of the 6th Armoured Division in Kharian, and oversaw the combat deployment in response to the massive military exercise by the Indian Army in 1985–86.

In 1988–1991, Lieutenant-General Khan was appointed the Field Commander of the XI Corps, stationed in Peshawar.

=== Chief of General Staff ===
In 1991, Lt-Gen. Khan was appointed the Chief of General Staff (CGS) at the Army GHQ under Chief of Army Staff General Asif Nawaz. After the sudden death of General Asif, Lt-Gen. Khan was one of the five most senior army generals in the race for the promotion to four-star rank.

Due to his office stature of Chief of General Staff, Lt-Gen. Khan had met both the necessary seniority and profound ability to become the army chief, despite the senior most Lt-Gen. Javed Nasir who was overlooked and never considered for this appointment.

His closeness and impartiality on issues between President Ghulam Ishaq and Prime Minister Sharif, Lt-Gen. Khan were eventually overlooked and subsequently superseded by retiring though junior-most Lt-Gen. Abdul Waheed Kakar for the appointment of army chief by President Ghulam Ishaq. Eventually, General Kakar was appointed and elevated as four-star general in the army, and became the army chief in 1994. Lt-Gen. Khan decided to serve in his capacity despite being superseded, and eventually retired in 1994, completing 40 years of military service with the army.

=== Death ===
He died at the CMH (Combined Military Hospital), Rawalpindi, Pakistan, on Saturday, 25 June 2016. He was buried in the Army Graveyard, Rawalpindi on 26 June 2016.

== See also ==
- Chief of General Staff (Pakistan)
- Abdul Waheed Kakar
- Arif Bangash
