= Ali Kuli Khan Khattak =

Pakistan Army Officer

Ali Kuli Khan Khattak HI(M)
- على قلى خان
- Born: Ali Kuli Khan Khattak; 1942 (age 83–84); Zarki Nasrati, NWFP, British India (present-day Takht-e-Nasrati Tehsil,(District Karak) Khyber Pakhtunkhwa, Pakistan)
- Military career
- Allegiance: Pakistan
- Branch: Pakistan Army
- Service years: 1964–1999
- Rank: Lieutenant-General
- Nickname: Kuli
- Units: 12th Baloch, Baloch Regiment
- Commands: Chief of General Staff; X Corps; 8th Army Division; Command and Staff College; Military Intelligence (DGMI)
- Conflicts: Indo-Pakistani War of 1965; Indo-Pakistani War of 1971
- Awards: Hilal-e-Imtiaz (Military)

Ali Kuli Khan Khattak HI(M) (Urdu: على قلى خان) is a Pakistani retired three-star general and former field commander of X Corps.

Prior to this field assignment, he was the chief of general staff and also directed the directorate-general of the Military Intelligence (DGMI) during his career. Khattak was also an instructor in the National Defence University before being elevated to the senior staff appointments. He has been credited for foresight in predicting the dangers of terrorism and the public appraised reputation when thwarting the conspiracy hatched by infiltrated rogue officers against the Government of Prime minister Benazir Bhutto.

He was superseded by former Prime Minister Nawaz Sharif when the latter approved the appointment of Khattak's course-mate, General Pervez Musharraf to four-star rank and chief of army staff.

== Personal life ==
Ali Kuli Khan Khattak comes from a military family; his father, Habibullah Khan Khattak, was a senior general officer in the Pakistan Army as well as World War II hero. He is brother in law of Gauher Ayub who is a Pakistani politician and son of General Ayub Khan. After passing the entrance exam with high records, Khattak applied in the ministry of defence for the armed forces. After passing the physical, educational qualifications and social psychological analysis tests, Khattak was asked to report to Pakistan Military Academy (PMA). In 1961, he joined the Pakistan Military Academy (PMA) and graduated with a Bachelor's degree from the class of 29th PMA Long Course together with Pervez Musharraf and Abdul Aziz Mirza (later four-star admiral) of Navy. Khattak stood first in his course and high academic marks in his educational courses comparing to other officers of joint forces. Khattak was commissioned in the 12th Battalion of the Baloch Regiment, the same regiment his father had earlier served.

He participated well in the 1965 war with India and commanded a small infantry platoon during the conflict.

== Career in the military ==
=== Indo-Pakistani conflict ===
After the 1965 war, Kuli attended the Armed Forces War College and proceeded to attend the National Defence University (NDU) and graduated with M.Sc. in Intelligence assessment. He served as an instructor and professor in Command and Staff College in Quetta and research assistant in Armed Forces War College. In 1974, he was promoted to lieutenant-colonel; and colonel in 1978. In 1986, he was promoted to one star rank, a Brigadier, and commanded the intelligence brigade. In 1991, he was promoted to Major-General rank and subsequently became General Officer Commanding of 8th Infantry Division. In 1994, he was appointed as director of directorate-general of the Military Intelligence. In 1995, along with Lieutenant-general Jehangir Karamat (chief of general staff), Khattak successfully infiltrated and thwarted the attempted coup hatched by major-general Zahirul Islam Abbasi in an attempt to overthrow the government of Prime minister Benazir Bhutto and replacing with far-right theocratic regime. He was honored by Prime minister Benazir Bhutto publicly and was succeeded to three-star appointment.

=== Exposing the 1995 coup d'état attempt ===
As the DGMI, he exposed the 1995 Pakistani coup d'état attempt in which Major General Zahirul Islam Abbasi tried to overthrow the Benazir Bhutto government and install an Islamist regime. This was the fourth failed (and exposed) coup attempt in Pakistani history. The first one was the 1951 Rawalpindi Conspiracy when Maj Gen Akbar Khan, then CGS tried to overthrow the Prime Minister Liaquat Ali Khan government over the handling of 1948 Kashmir War, the second one was the Attock Conspiracy Case during tenure of Prime Minister Zulfikar Ali Bhutto, and the third one was during General Zia-ul-Haq's era when Maj Gen Tajammal Hussain Malik was arrested along with other conspirators.

=== Staff and field appointments ===
Ali Kuli took over the X Corps in October 1995 after his investigations led the Army to uncover the coup attempt. He replaced the then X corps commander Lt Gen Ghulam Muhammad Malik, whose name also surfaced in the coup attempts, but was later exonerated. Kuli later became the Chief of General Staff after Lt Gen Iftikhar Ali Khan was made the Defence Secretary by then Prime Minister Nawaz Sharif. He retired from the army when Musharraf was made the COAS in October 1998. At that time, Musharraf superseded two senior officers; Ali Kuli Khan Khattak and Khalid Nawaz, the then Quarter-Master General (QMG).

=== Resignation ===
In 1995, he was promoted to Lieutenant-General rank with Pervez Musharraf seconded to him. Problems with Musharraf started in 1995, when Khattak was selected by Chief of Army Staff General Jehangir Karamat as Chief of General Staff. He also had cordial relations with Chief of Army Staff General Karamat, but this came at a bad juncture for Khattak in 1998. In 1998 Prime minister Nawaz Sharif forcefully relieved General Karamat of his duties (see Dismissal of General Jehangir Karamat). Prime minister ignored General Ali Kuli Khan's appointment and decided to promote Pervez Musharraf to four star rank and assigned duties over him.

== Awards and decorations ==

Hilal-e-Imtiaz (Military) (Crescent of Excellence)	Tamgha-e-Diffa (General Service Medal) Siachen Glacier Clasp		Sitara-e-Harb 1965 War (War Star 1965)
Sitara-e-Harb 1971 War (War Star 1971)	Tamgha-e-Jang 1965 War (War Medal 1965)	Tamgha-e-Jang 1971 War (War Medal 1971)	Tamgha-e-Baqa (Nuclear Test Medal) 1998
10 Years Service Medal	20 Years Service Medal	30 Years Service Medal	Tamgha-e-Sad Saala Jashan-e- Wiladat-e-Quaid-e-Azam (100th Birth Anniversary of Muhammad Ali Jinnah) 1976
Hijri Tamgha (Hijri Medal) 1979	Jamhuriat Tamgha (Democracy Medal) 1988	Qarardad-e-Pakistan Tamgha (Resolution Day Golden Jubilee Medal) 1990	Tamgha-e-Salgirah Pakistan (Independence Day Golden Jubilee Medal) 1997

Military offices
Preceded by Iftikhar Ali Khan	Chief of General Staff; 1997 – 1998	Succeeded by Aziz Khan
