= Pakistani intelligence community =

Various intelligence agencies of Pakistan

The state emblem of Islamic Republic of Pakistan

The Pakistani intelligence community (Urdu: جمیعت ہائے پاکستان برائے اشتراکِ سراغرسانی) comprises the various intelligence agencies of Pakistan that work internally and externally to manage, research and collect intelligence necessary for national security. Consolidated intelligence organizations include the personnel and members of the intelligence agencies, military intelligence, and civilian intelligence and analysis directorates operationalized under the executive ministries of the government of Pakistan.

A number of intelligences services are active working on varied intelligence programs including the collection and production of foreign and domestic intelligence, contribute to military planning, and perform espionage. The best known intelligence services are the Inter-Services Intelligence (ISI), Intelligence Bureau (IB), Military Intelligence (MI) and the Federal Investigation Agency (FIA).

== Catalogue ==
There are no fixed or official name for the intelligences services of Pakistan as one cooperative federation; all intelligence services operated under their name. Intelligence authors and researchers termed Pakistan's intelligence services as "Pakistan Intelligence Community" or goes by "Pakistan Intelligence Services and Agencies". The term "Intelligence Community" was first described by the English language newspapers, Frontier Post and Dawn in 1994.

Pakistan subsequently made changes in foreign policy after accepting the United States offer of the military assistance and economic aid in return for joining the political alliance system to contain the international communism in 1953. In a secret understanding between President Zia-ul-Haq and President Ronald Reagan, the US Intelligence Community provided a large quantity of espionage equipment, technical information, and intelligence offensive training to the Pakistan Intelligence Community. Initially, the Pakistan Intelligence Community was trained along in British lines, but subsequently CIA trained 200 ISI officers, Pakistan consolidated its intelligence circle under one chain of command and improved its intelligence methods.

== Overview of Intelligence Services ==
=== National Intelligence Coordination Committee ===
Established in November 2020, the coordination body created to enhance the coordination and capabilities of Pakistan's intelligence agencies. The organization was inaugurated June 24, 2021.

=== Inter-Services Intelligence ===
Established in 1948 by Major-General Walter Cawthorn, the Directorate for Inter-Services Intelligence (more commonly known as Inter-Services Intelligence or simply by its initials ISI) is the most premier and largest intelligence service. Primary roles are to consolidate and assess intelligence to senior government and military officials. Intelligence agents are civilians and military officials working together on national security matters. The ISI has been headed by a serving three-star general of the Pakistan Army, who is appointed by the Prime Minister on recommendation of the Chief of Army Staff.

=== Intelligence Bureau ===
The Intelligence Bureau (IB) is primarily a civilian intelligence agency tasked with non-military espionage activities and the intelligence cycle management component that falls under "civilian intelligence". IB is Pakistan's oldest intelligence agency. It is directly under the Prime Minister. Its primary role is to build initiatives, including counter-intelligence and foreign intelligence management. Its Director-General is appointed by the Prime Minister of Pakistan from the civil or the retired officials from the military intelligence services, but in the past few decades, the Director-General of the IB has usually been the senior-most officer of the Police Service of Pakistan.

=== Federal Investigation Agency ===
Established in 1947 as "Special Police Establishment (SPE)", the Federal Investigation Agency (more popularly known as FIA) was later reformed under its current name and structure in 1974 by the Government. The FIA is a principle investigative intelligence service and mandate to take initiatives against the foreign or national elements working against the national interest of the country. It is a civilian intelligence service working under the Ministry of Interior. Its Director-General is appointed by the Prime Minister of Pakistan.

=== Defence intelligence services ===
In Pakistan Armed Forces, there are three active-duty uniformed intelligence services. The Air Intelligence reports directly to the Chief of Air Staff and the Air Force leads the appointment of the director-general of the Air Intelligence (AI). The Naval Intelligence (NI) also directly under the Chief of Naval Staff, responsible for gaining knowledge on threats on sea and marine vicinity. The NI also used by the Pakistan Marines to conduct their operations. The Military Intelligence is tasked with taking initiatives against counterinsurgency (COIN) operations, identifying and eliminating sleeper cells, foreign military agents and other anti-Pakistani elements within Pakistan. It is under the Chief of Army Staff.

=== Civil Armed Forces ===
There are also several smaller field intelligence units within the Civil Armed Forces:

- Pakistan Rangers has intelligence wings:
  - Sindh Rangers Intelligence Wing
  - Punjab Rangers Intelligence Wing
- The Frontier Corps possess Field Intelligence Units:
  - Khyber Pakhtunkhwa (North)
  - Khyber Pakhtunkhwa (South)
  - Balochistan (North)
  - Balochistan (South)
- Pakistan Coast Guard Intelligence Wing
- Gilgit Baltistan Scouts Field Intelligence
- Frontier Constabulary Intelligence

=== National Counter Terrorism Authority ===
The National Counter Terrorism Authority (NACTA) develops counterterrorism policies, reviews their implementation and advises the government on countering extremism. Established in 2008, NACTA received its legal framework and mandate through the NACTA Act of 2013.

=== Special Branch ===
The Special Branch is a vital intelligence unit within the Police Service of Pakistan, commonly recognized as the "eyes and ears" of the government. It plays a crucial role in supporting policy formulation and upholding the security of individuals' lives and property, as well as maintaining law and order. At the helm of the organization is an officer holding the rank of Additional Inspector General of Police. To enhance administrative and operational efficiency, the Special Branch is structured into nine regions, each under the leadership of an officer with the rank of Senior Superintendent or Superintendent of Police. The organization maintains field offices across various locations in Pakistan to effectively carry out its responsibilities.

=== Counter Terrorism Department ===
Counter Terrorism Department (CTD) is an anti-terrorism unit that replaced the Crime Investigation Department (CID) in the provinces. CTDs are responsible for investigating crimes, interrogating suspects and gathering intelligence on terrorist groups. They operate under the provincial Home Ministry and are led by an Additional Inspector General of Police.

=== National Accountability Bureau ===
The Ehtesab Act, 1997 established an Ehtesab Cell, charged with the investigation and prosecution of corruption. Under the National Accountability Ordinance, 1999, the NAB was established as the cell's successor, and given the additional responsibility of preventing and raising awareness of corruption.

=== Financial Monitoring Unit ===
The Financial Monitoring Unit (FMU) is the Financial Intelligence Unit of Pakistan established under the provisions of Anti-Money Laundering Act, 2010 (Previously Anti-Money Laundering Ordinance, 2007). It is an independent intelligence service department of the Government of Pakistan and primarily responsible for analyzing suspicious transactions with respect to money laundering or terrorist financing and building efforts against these critical offenses.

=== Directorate General of Intelligence and Investigation ===
Directorate General of Intelligence and Investigation was established on 12 August 1957. Initially centered at Karachi later it was restructured and headquartered in Islamabad. The Directorate serves as the revenue Intelligence of Pakistan that execute its responsibilities under the Federal Board of Revenue. The Directorate is primarily aimed at collecting information regarding tax related offences, smuggling and rendering protection to the economic interest of Pakistan. Its secondary role involves investigation of Sales Tax fraud. Bulk of its rank and file comes from Pakistan Customs and Inland Revenue Service of Pakistan.

=== Anti-Narcotics Force ===
ANF intelligence is crucial in combating drug trafficking in Pakistan. They employ various methods to gather information, allowing them to build a comprehensive picture of drug activity. This intelligence is then used to target investigations, disrupt operations, and arrest key traffickers. This plays a vital role in international efforts against global drug trafficking.

=== National Cyber Crime Investigation Agency ===
NCCIA is a specialized agency established by the Government of Pakistan on 3 May 2024 to investigate cyber crime within the country. The agency replaced the Cybercrime Wing of the Federal Investigation Agency (FIA) .

== Intelligence reforms since 1970s ==
In 1972–73, Prime Minister Zulfikar Ali Bhutto adopted many recommendations of the Hamoodur Rahman Commission's papers after seeing the intelligence failure in East Pakistan. This led the reformation of the FIA as Prime Minister Bhutto visioned the FIA as equivalent to American FBI which not only protects the country from internal crises but also from foreign suspected threats therefore he established the FIA on the same pattern. In the 1970s, Prime Minister Bhutto had the Pakistan intelligence to actively run military intelligence programs in various countries to procure scientific expertise and technical papers in line of Alsos Mission of Manhattan Project.

Both FIA and IB were empowered during the government and the scope of their operation was expanded during the 1970s. Though ISI did lost its importance in the 1970s, the ISI valued its importance in the 1980s after successfully running the military intelligence program against the Soviet Union. Sensing the nature of competition, President Zia-ul-Haq consolidated the intelligence services after the ISI getting training from the CIA in the 1980s, and subsequently improved its methods of intelligence.

=== Budget ===
The Intelligence budgets are kept as secret; a little information is known in public. In 2012, politicians made unsuccessful efforts to introduce a bill for intelligence services financial funds accountable to the Parliament. It later was withdrawn as it reportedly did not have the concurrence of the special committee of the ruling PPP.

In 2013, the Supreme Court ordered the government to submit the secret funds to public accounts utilized in the past to topple political governments.

According to the reports and research, Prime Minister Zulfikar Ali Bhutto and the PPP spent more than ~$25.8 million on the intelligence services; other reports give vary figures. Between the fiscal year of 1988–90, Prime Minister Benazir Bhutto and the PPP government spent more than ₨.400 million to buy loyalty of parliamentarians to defeat a no-confidence motion against it, to win elections in Azad Kashmir and to remove the provincial government in the then NWFP to install its chief minister.

=== Criticisms, controversies, and satire ===
Since the 1990s, the entire intelligence community has been under intense criticism from international authors and observers regarding the issues of terrorism, human rights abuses, and methods of intelligence procurements. The intelligence community of Pakistan was first described the English language newspapers, Frontier Post as "invisible government" in an edition published on 18 May 1994. Another English language newspaper, the Dawn, also described the intelligence community as "our secret godfathers" in its opinion section on 25 April 1994. In 2011, the US intelligence community had raised allegations of harbouring Osama bin Laden in Abbottabad. The U.S. President Barack Obama himself declared: "We think that there had to be some sort of support network for bin Laden inside of Pakistan," in a "60 Minutes" interview with CBS news. He also added that the U.S. was not "sure" "who or what that support network was."

In the period from 2003–2012, it is estimated that 8000 people were kidnapped by Pakistani intelligence services in the Balochistan province. In 2008 alone an estimated 1102 Baloch people disappeared. There have also been reports of torture. The Baloch leaders successfully reached to the Supreme Court intervened in the conflict. The Supreme Court undertook its large investigating the "missing persons" and issued an arrest warrant for the former President Pervez Musharaff. Furthermore, the Chief Justice of the court said the military must act under the government's direction and follow well-defined parameters set by the Constitution.

In June 2011, the prime minister was informed that 41 missing people had returned to their homes, false cases against 38 had been withdrawn and several others had been traced. The PM urged police to trace the missing people and help them to return to their homes. The Supreme Court decided ordered the government to the grant of subsistence allowance to the affected families.

== See also ==
- Senate Committee on Intelligence and National Security
- Cabinet Committee on National Security
- National Intelligence Coordination Committee
- The Establishment
