= 1995 Pakistani coup attempt =

1995 attempted military takeover of government in Pakistan

Operation Khalifa
Date	October 1995
Location	Islamabad, Pakistan
Result	Failed coup: Benazir saves her government; Coup plotters arrested

Belligerents
Government of Pakistan	Fraction of the Army; Islamists

Commanders and leaders
Benazir Bhutto Gen. Abdul Waheed Kakar Lt.Gen. Jehangir Karamat Maj.Gen. Ali Kuli Khan Khattak	Maj Gen.Zahirul Islam Abbasi; Brigadier Mustansir Billah; Muhammad Saeed Khan; Qari Saifullah Akhtar

The Pakistan coup attempt of 1995 (code-named Operation Khalifa) was a secretive Coup d'état plot hatched by renegade officers of Pakistan Army and Islamists against the government of Benazir Bhutto, the prime minister of Pakistan.

The plotters aimed to overthrow the constitutional government and establish military rule in Pakistan. The plot was foiled after intelligence agencies tipped off the Pakistan Army.

Despite the failure, the coup attempt would weaken Bhutto's government considerably in the aftermath.

== History ==
Benazir Bhutto's Pakistan Peoples Party won the 1988 general election after Muhammad Zia-ul-Haq's 11-year dictatorship came to an abrupt end with his death.

In 1989, members of the Inter-Services Intelligence were exposed in a sting operation as wanting to overthrow the government of Benazir Bhutto. Major Amir, the co-conspirator of the notorious Operation Midnight Jackal, said he liked Sharif as a political leader and wanted to make Mr. Sharif the new prime minister. He said Sharif was a part of his political camp and would continue the agenda of Zia-ul-Haq, the person who had launched Sharif's political careers and gave his party access to public funds.

== Causes ==
With accusations of corruption in the country and particularly within the government, a level of discontent had grown in various circles. UN sanctions designed to stop Pakistan's nuclear program also began to affect the wider economy. Officers who had been recruited under Zia-ul-Haq wanted to continue the nuclear program, which was considered to be stopped by Benazir after a deal with the United States. Gen. Zia-ul-Haq's policies launched in the 1980s vastly increased the role of Deobandi Islam in public life. General Zia encouraged fundamentalist Islamic law and religious education in all segments of Pakistani society to build his legitimacy (which had become weak after he had overthrown a popularly-elected leader and suspended democracy) on being a good Muslim ruler. Resistance to the Soviet invasion of Afghanistan was hailed as a religious duty. To this end, Pakistani intelligence and military services, with the help of the CIA, recruited, trained, and armed Afghan mujahideen to fight the Soviet Army. In the process, a vast network of madrases and hardline mosques were established. Later, this network would be used to keep Zia-ul-Haq in power and suppress democracy, leading to the much greater problem of religious extremism and terrorism in Pakistan.

== Plot ==
The main actors accused in the failed coup attempt were Major General Zahirul Islam Abbasi, Brigadier Mustansir Billah and Qari Saifullah. While Brigadier Billah was assumed to be the ideologue of the group, the main executor was supposed to be Qari Saifullah. Major General Abbasi was serving at the time as director-general of infantry corps at the Pakistani Army high command in Rawalpindi. With the help of sympathetic military officers, the group allegedly began plotting against the civilian government of Benazir Bhutto and the army chief Gen. Abdul Waheed Kakar. It was claimed that they planned to assassinate Bhutto, Kakar, senior cabinet ministers, and the military chiefs to bring about a corruption-free government in Pakistan. They were acting on a tip-off from then Maj. Gen. Ali Kuli Khan Khattak, who was also the director-general of military intelligence (DGMI), and then chief of general staff (CGS) Lt. Gen. Jehangir Karamat, who later became the Chief of the Army Staff, and suppressed the coup by arresting 36 army officers and 20 civilians in Rawalpindi and the capital Islamabad.

Qari Saifullah saved himself by becoming an "approver" (government witness) on behalf of the prosecution during the trial. Based on this deal, Saifullah was given freedom in 1996 and did not face a trial. It would not have been possible to convict the other officers without his testimony. While Saifullah gained his freedom, the other alleged co-conspirators were convicted.

== Other views ==
Professor Lawrence Ziring, former president of the American Institute of Pakistani Studies, questioned the coup's merit. In his 2003 book, "Pakistan at the cross currents of history", Ziring said there was "little evidence to implicate the accused" (p. 239). He also suggested that the alleged coup was little more than an attempt by Bhutto to bring the military establishment closer under her control. (p. 239) He also describes Bhutto as lashing out against her critics in November 1995 and accusing (without proof) those involved as having planned to kill her, most of the army command and the president of Pakistan.

== Aftermath ==
Benazir Bhutto was succeeded in 1997 by Nawaz Sharif, who would dismiss Army Chief Gen. Karamat and Lt. Gen. Khattak. Sharif maintained links with hardline Islamist groups through financial support. He also helped Muhammad Rafiq Tarar, who served as a senior justice of the Supreme Court of Pakistan from 1991 to 1994 and as the 28th Chief Justice of Lahore High Court from 1989 to 1991 – a supporter of Tableeghi Jamaat – become the president of Pakistan.

The alleged plotters were convicted by a military court and awarded different sentences ranging from 2 to 14 years. The highest sentence was given to Brigadier Billah (14 years). Major Gen. Abbasi was given a 7-year term in jail. His imprisonment started in 1995 and he was to remain in prison until 2002 (7 years). During his period of imprisonment, Abbasi lodged an appeal to the Supreme Court of Pakistan in 1997 for a review of his case. This was refused since he had been convicted by a military court, and it was outside the purview of civilian courts. He was not granted release. However, based on good conduct during his prison term, Abbasi was given early release from prison by General Pervez Musharraf in October 1999. With his military career over, Abbasi moved to organise a political party with the aim of creating awareness and establishing a Sunni Islamic law through parliamentary legislation. Later, Abbasi formed another political party called the Azmat-e-Islam party with the same objectives. He led a quiet life in Rawalpindi, and delivered lectures to audiences on the values of religious life and on politics until his death in July 2009.

Azmat-e-Islam and Bedar Pakistan are, in fact, two separate parties headed by Zaheer ul Islam Abbasi and Abdul Razaq Mian, respectively.

All of the other alleged plotters have also been released from prison and are now settled in Pakistan leading normal lives as citizens.

== See also ==
- Zahirul Islam Abbasi
- Zia-ul-Haq's Islamization
- Benazir Bhutto
- Islamism
- Siachen conflict
- Kashmir conflict
- History of Pakistan
- Inter-Services Intelligence
- Pakistan Armed Forces
