= Azhar Waqas =

Pakistan military officer

Azhar Waqas HI(M)
- Education: Pakistan Military Academy
- Military career
- Allegiance: Pakistan
- Branch: Pakistan Army
- Service years: 1991 — present
- Rank: Lieutenant General
- Unit: 12 Punjab Regiment
- Commands: DG Pakistan Rangers; DG Military Intelligence; Adjutant General of Pakistan Army
- Awards: Hilal-i-Imtiaz (Military)

Azhar Waqas, HI(M) is a three-star general in the Pakistan Army, currently serving as the Adjutant General at the General Headquarters (GHQ), Rawalpindi.

== Military career ==
Waqas was commissioned in the Pakistan Army through the 84th PMA Long Course in the 12 Punjab Regiment.

In 2019, he was promoted to the rank of Major General and assumed the office of GOC 40th Infantry Division, Okara.

In January 2020, Waqas was appointed as the Director General Military Intelligence (DGMI), succeeding Major General Sarfraz Ali.

In September 2022, Waqas took over as the Director General of Pakistan Rangers (Sindh), replacing Major General Iftikhar Hassan Chaudhry.

In November 2024, he was promoted to the rank of Lieutenant General and appointed as the Adjutant General at GHQ, Rawalpindi.

Waqas is recipient of Hilal-i-Imtiaz and Imtiazi Sanad.
