= Charles Guthrie =

Charles Guthrie may refer to:

- Charles Guthrie (athletic director), American athletic director for Akron Zips
- Charles Guthrie, Baron Guthrie of Craigiebank (1938–2025), British field marshal, chief of the Defence Staff
- Charles Claude Guthrie (1880–1963), American physiologist
- Charles John Guthrie, Lord Guthrie (1849–1920), Scottish judge
- Charles Guthrie (1939–1988), American mining engineer, husband of Nancy Guthrie, who disappeared in 2026
