= Pakistan Armed Forces deployments =

Pakistani military deployments outside Pakistan

Pakistan Armed Forces deployments include all Pakistani military deployments that are stationed outside Pakistan and serving in other countries. The sixth largest military power in terms of active troops, Pakistan has an extensive history of overseas military presence, especially in the Middle East, where it has maintained military contingents, missions and battalions in several states. As part of its foreign policy efforts to expand its military relations and influence in the region, Pakistan signed defence protocols during the 1970s with several Arab countries including Saudi Arabia, Libya, Jordan, Iraq, Oman, the United Arab Emirates and Kuwait, under which members of the armed forces of these countries were imparted professional training by Pakistani advisers and military trainers. Saudi Arabia signed a bilateral agreement with Pakistan on defense cooperation; during that time, there were 50,000 to 60,000 Pakistani military personnel serving abroad with the largest number of these, .

== Background ==
The oil boom in the Persian Gulf during the 1970s and 1980s brought rapid economic growth and geostrategic importance to the region. During this period, many Gulf states sought regional neighbour Pakistan's assistance in the formation of their military capabilities. A number of Pakistan Air Force, Army and Navy personnel were deputed to Saudi Arabia, the United Arab Emirates, Qatar, Bahrain, Jordan, Iraq and Syria, primarily to train and establish local security forces as well as to provide technical assistance.

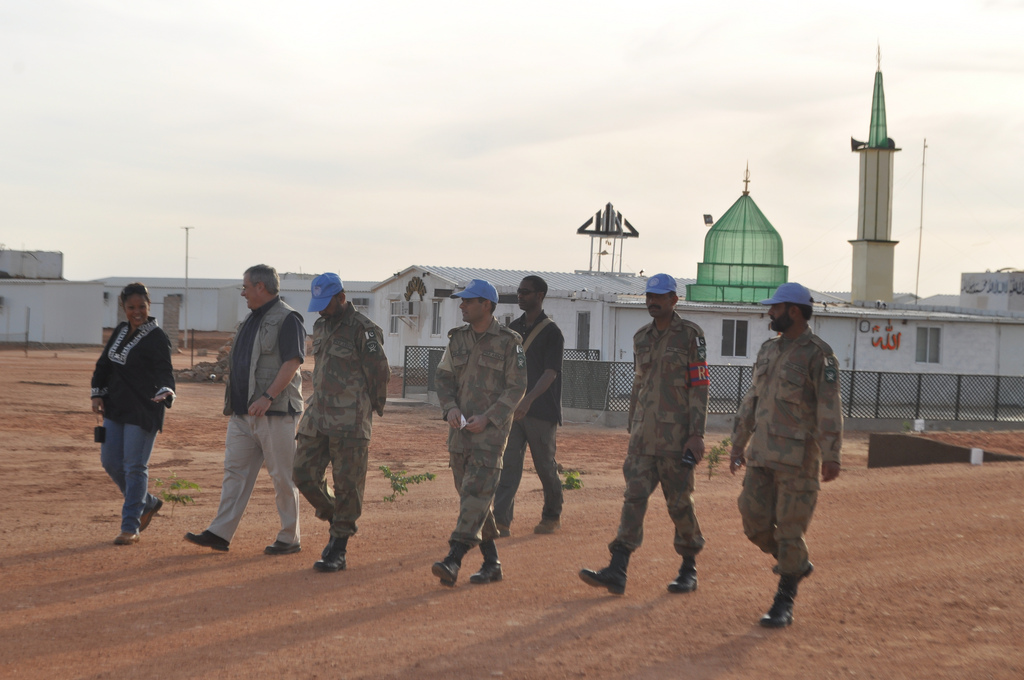
Pakistan Army providing security on behalf of the United Nations in Sudan.

== History of deployments ==
=== Africa ===
The Air Force of Zimbabwe (AFZ) underwent a series of restructuring in the early 1980s, following its reconstitution from the previously-existing Rhodesian Air Force. During this period, the AFZ sought Pakistani and foreign assistance to remain operational. Zimbabwean President Robert Mugabe requested Pakistan to detach an officer to head the AFZ and serve as its commander. Subsequently, Air Vice-Marshal Azim Daudpota was appointed Commander of the Air Force of Zimbabwe, serving in the position from July 1983 to January 1986. He remains the first and only non-local commander of the AFZ. A large number of other PAF officers were deployed in Zimbabwe as well, along with Daudpota.

=== Kuwait ===
Defence cooperation between Pakistan and Kuwait dates back to the late 1960s. Officers from the Pakistan Army, Air Force and Navy have been deployed in Kuwait to provide training and instruction to Kuwaiti forces. In 1990, up to 700 personnel of the Pakistan Armed Forces were stationed in Kuwait. Pakistani officers served in technical and advisory roles in the Kuwaiti Army during the Gulf War. Pakistan was a member of the coalition forces against the 1990 invasion of Kuwait and Pakistani personnel took part in UN mine hunting operations in Kuwait.

=== Qatar ===
There are close to 650 Pakistani troops permanently stationed in Qatar.

During FIFA World Cup 2022 held in Qatar, Pakistan Army on the appeal of Qatar deployed 4,500 infantry troops. Qatar had sought the help of security forces and police agencies from various countries, including France, Jordan, Turkey, Britain and the US, to ensure the safety of an estimated 1.2 million fans expected to attend the World Cup, which started on 20 November 2022. However, Pakistan became the only country to send foot soldiers to Doha with 4,500 infantry troops arriving in Qatar. Pakistan contributed largest number of troops to Qatar, helping the Emirate to ensure security of the World Cup.

=== Saudi Arabia ===
Saudi Arabia has historically remained Pakistan's closest defense partner in the Middle East, with both countries sharing extensive military and intelligence cooperation. Military relations between the two were expanded in 1967. Former Saudi intelligence chief Prince Turki bin Sultan described the level of cooperation as "probably one of the closest relationships in the world between any two countries" while Pakistan's ambassador to Saudi Arabia, Naeem Khan, stated that Pakistan considered Saudi Arabia's security as a "personal matter". The Pakistan Air Force has been in contact with the Royal Saudi Air Force (RSAF) since the early 1960s. Following grievances over British military cooperation in the 1960s, King Faisal turned to Pakistan's assistance for air force training and maintenance. In the 1960s, Pakistan helped the RSAF

Pakistan deployed troops in Saudi Arabia for "security duties" in the wake of the 1979 Iranian Revolution. A protocol was signed between Pakistan and Saudi Arabia on 14 December 1982 following the latter's request for military manpower assistance. Throughout the 1970s and 1980s, up to 15,000 Pakistani troops were stationed in Saudi Arabia, to provide defense to the country. Some of them were part of a brigade combat force positioned near the Israeli-Jordanian-Saudi border. As of the Gulf War in 1991, up to 13,000 troops and 6,000 advisers from Pakistan were posted in Saudi Arabia. Under the 1982 protocol, cooperation was widened to include military training, defense production and sharing, and joint exercises. Contingents of the Pakistan Armed Forces have frequently participated in joint military exercises inside Saudi Arabia in conjunction with the Saudi Armed Forces. Pakistani military presence in the kingdom continues presently, providing Riyadh support against internal and external regional threats.

The Pakistan Navy and Royal Saudi Navy also share wide-ranging maritime cooperation, having conducted a series of joint naval exercises. Officers of the Royal Saudi Navy were provided training by the Pakistan Navy during the RSN's formative years.

As of 2018, some 1,600 Pakistan army officers and troops are stationed in the Kingdom in accordance with a 1982 security protocol between the two sides. In February 2018, additional 1,000 troops were deployed.

In April 2026, Pakistan Air Force deployed fighters and support aircraft at the King Abdulaziz Air Base in Saudi Arabia's eastern province.

In May 2026, it was confirmed by the Government of Pakistan sources that Pakistan deployed 8,000 soldiers, one HQ-9 air defence system, and one squadron of Pakistan Air Force consisted of 16 JF17 jets.

=== United Arab Emirates ===
Defence relations between Pakistan and the UAE began shortly before the UAE's formation in 1971. Pakistani troops imparted training to members of the Abu Dhabi defence forces as far back as 1968 upon the request of the founder of the UAE Sheikh Zayed, as the British were about to hand over command of the Gulf Trucial States. A protocol was signed in the mid 1970s, and defence cooperation continued for the succeeding decades. Both countries share geographical proximity and a longstanding history of bilateral relations. The Pakistan Army established an armour training school in the UAE, and provided training to UAE commando battalions, as well as all armed and artillery corps officers. Pakistani personnel also held prominent positions as advisers and trainers in the UAE Air Force (UAEAF). The UAEAF is dubbed by Pakistani author Shahid Amin to have been "an extension of the Pakistan Air Force" at one point. The first Chief of Air Staff of the UAE, appointed by Sheikh Zayed, was Air Cdre Ayaz Ahmed Khan, followed by Ghulam Haider, Jamal A. Khan and Feroz A. Khan, all of whom were Pakistan Air Force (PAF) officers. In total, the first five Chiefs of Air Staff of the UAE Air Force were Pakistanis. The succeeding commanders were native officers, although group captain ranked officers of the PAF continued serving as Deputy Chief of Air Staff. As of 2004, the UAEAF had around 55 Pakistani flying instructors, and there were a few number of Pakistani personnel serving in the UAE Army and Navy. Officers of the Pakistan Navy have served in the UAE while training the local naval force.

=== During active conflicts ===
- Six-Day War: During the Six-Day War, Pakistani flying ace Saiful Azam shot down two Israeli aircraft and was awarded Jordan's Order of Istiqlal and Iraq's medal of bravery, the Nut al-Shujat as well as becoming the only pilot with kills against two airforces (India and Israel) and the pilot with the record for number of Israeli aircraft shot down.
- Battle of Mogadishu (1993): More commonly known as Black Hawk Down, a Pakistani soldier was killed and two were wounded in support of United States.
- Black September in Jordan: Then Brigadier Muhammad Zia-ul-Haq (later Chief of Army Staff and President of Pakistan), played a key role in planning the offensives in this conflict in support of Jordan.
- Operation Gothic Serpent: One of the deadliest attack and encirclement of UN forces (also comprising Pakistan Army troops), later relieved by a heavy rescue convoy of US, Pakistani and Malaysian troops.
- Grand Mosque Seizure: it has been claimed by some sources that Pakistani Special Services Group were involved in recapturing the Grand Mosque from militants. However multiple sources state that only French military advisors were involved.
- Unified Task Force: After the killing of several Pakistani peace keepers in the task force, the task force's mandate was changed to using 'all necessary measures' to deliver humanitarian aid resulting in mission success. and is regarded as a success.

== Current deployments ==
=== UN missions ===
A large number of Pakistan Armed Forces personnel are deployed overseas as part of the United Nations' peacekeeping missions. In 2010, an estimated 12,000 personnel were serving abroad, making Pakistan a large contributor of troops to the UN:

| Start of operation | Name of operation | Location | | Conflict | Contribution |
|---|---|---|---|---|---|
| 1999 | United Nations Organization Mission in the Democratic Republic of the Congo (MONUC) | (Democratic Republic of the Congo) | Democratic Republic of Congo | Second Congo War | 3556 Troops. |
| 2003 | United Nations Mission in Liberia (UNMIL) | (Liberia) | Liberia | Second Liberian Civil War | 2741 Troops. |
| 2004 | United Nations Operation in Burundi ONUB | (Burundi) | Burundi | Burundi Civil War | 1185 Troops. |
| 2004 | United Nations Operation in Côte d'Ivoire (UNOCI) | (Ivory Coast) | Côte d'Ivoire | Civil war in Côte d'Ivoire | 1145 Troops. |
| 2005 | United Nations Mission in the Sudan (UNMIS) | (Sudan) | Sudan | Second Sudanese Civil War | 1542 Troops. |
| | Staff/Observers | | | | 191 Observers. |

- The total number of troops currently serving in peacekeeping missions is 10,173 (as of March 2007).

==== Notable deployments with United Nations ====
- United Nations Mission in Liberia
- United Nations Mission in South Sudan
- United Nations Mission in Sudan
- MONUSCO
- United Nations Operation in Burundi
- United Nations Operation in Côte d'Ivoire
- United Nations Protection Force

=== Anti-piracy operations ===
Pakistan Navy has been a major participant of Combined Task Force 150, based in Bahrain, established to monitor, inspect, board, and stop suspect shipping associated with terrorism in the Horn of Africa. This task force comprising warships of Italy, France, Germany, Pakistan, Canada, the United Kingdom and United States has also been commanded by a Pakistani Admiral. Pakistan Navy has also been most frequently rested with responsibility to command Combined Task Force 150.

On the announcement of Pakistan taking the command, several other nations have also expressed their interests in participating in Combined Task Force 150 in some way.

In 2024, amid Red Sea Crisis in which sea routes were disturbed for the cargo shipping, Pakistan Navy deployed warships in order to secure sea lines of communication.

== See also ==
- United Nations peacekeeping
