= Qari Saifullah Akhtar =

Al-Qaeda member (1960–2017)

Qari Mawlānā Saifullah Akhtar قاری صیف الله اختر
- Born: 1960; Quetta, West Pakistan
- Died: 9 January 2017 (aged 56–57); Nawa District, Ghazni Province
- Citizenship: Pakistani; Afghani
- Education: Jamia Uloom-ul-Islamia
- Known for: Afghan mujahideen leader and alleged member of Al-Qaeda,
- Political party: Harkat-ul-Jihad-al-Islami; Harkat-ul-Mujahideen
- Military career
- Conflicts: Afghan conflict; Soviet-Afghan War; Kashmir Conflict; Insurgency in Jammu and Kashmir; 1995 Pakistani coup attempt; War on terror; War in Pakistan; 2007 Karsaz bombing; War in Afghanistan †

Qari Saifullah Akhtar (Urdu: قاری سیف اللہ اختر; born 1960 – died 9 January 2017) was Pakistani mujahideen jihadist leader and Islamist cleric, who was the leader of Harkat-ul-Jihad-al-Islami (HUJI), a jihadist organization.

He was reportedly involved in the 1995 coup attempt to topple the Pakistani government led by Benazir Bhutto. He was also an alleged member of Al-Qaeda and graduated from Jamia Uloom-ul-Islamia in Karachi.

He was sanctioned as a Specially Designated Global Terrorist under the Specially Designated Nationals and Blocked Persons List by the United States Department of the Treasury's Office of Foreign Assets Control; his year of birth being listed as either 1964 or from 1963 to 1965, with a place of birth in Daraz Jaldak, Qalat District, Zabul Province, Afghanistan with a citizenship of both Pakistan and Afghanistan and further address in Quetta, Pakistan. He was from the Tokhi tribe of Pashtuns while his title qari means a reciter of Quran.

He was killed by National Directorate of Security during a raid in Nawa District, Ghazni Province of Afghanistan on 9 January 2017.

== Activities ==
He was a key figure and founder of HUJI and was involved in jihadi groups since the early 1980s. He was appointed the head of organization following the killing of Mawlana Irshad Ahmed at Sharana during clashes with Soviet forces.

He was reportedly involved in the 1995 coup attempt to topple the Pakistani government led by Benazir Bhutto. When HUJI merged with Harkat-ul-Mujahideen (HUM) around 1990 to form Harkat-ul-Ansar (HUA), Akhtar acted as deputy to former HUM leader Fazalur Rehman Khalil. HUA splintered into two separate groups in 1997, allowing Akhtar to become Emir of HUJI.

In 1998 when Osama bin Laden released a fatwa under the banner World Islamic Front for Jihad Against the Jews and Crusaders, segments of HUJI have joined al-Qaeda. Akhtar who had been running a training camp known as the Rish Khor camp in Afghanistan before the US invaded Afghanistan in 2001, he had trained 3,500 persons in conventional and unconventional combat.

=== First Arrest ===
Following the United States invasion of Afghanistan, He escaped from Afghanistan but was apprehended in August 2004 in the United Arab Emirates. He was then handed over to Pakistani authorities.

A petition was filed in the Supreme Court by Akhtar's brother-in-law, Abdur Rehman Mahmood, on 12 October 2004, challenging Akhtar's arrest and seeking his appearance before the court. The petitioner also sought a court order to prevent possible deportation of Akhtar to another country. The petition was thrown out on 18 January 2005. The petitioner was instructed to move the High Court by filing a habeas corpus writ petition. "You first invoke the jurisdiction of a high court and if it gets dismissed there only then you come to the top court," said Justice Falak Sher. "We can’t entertain a direct writ petition at this stage." However, the bench, consisting of Javed Iqbal and Mian Shakirullah Jan, ordered the government to submit comprehensive replies in the cases of several people, including that of Akhtar, who had been arrested on suspicion of terrorism.

On 21 May 2007, Akhtar reached his hometown of Mandi Bahauddin, after reportedly being released by an intelligence agency earlier that morning. The Daily Times reported, "He was thrown out of a car in a deserted area near Chakwal."

=== Second Arrest ===
According to the Dawn newspaper, He was again arrested in Lahore on 26 February 2008 for his alleged involvement in the attempted assassination of Benazir Bhutto in Karachi on 18 October 2007. "He is involved in the blasts in Karsaz. Therefore he has been arrested," Interior Minister Hamid Nawaz told The Associated Press.

He was released from custody on 26 March 2008 for lack of evidence. That September he was suspected to be involved in the Islamabad Marriott Hotel bombing.

He was re-arrested in August 2010 after he was injured in a drone strike but was re-released four months later.

== Death ==
The National Directorate of Security of Republic of Afghanistan confirmed that Akhtar was killed in a raid in Nawa District, Ghazni Province on 9 January 2017.
