= Zahirul Islam Abbasi =

Pakistani Army general

Major General Zahirul Islam Abbasi
- ﻇﻬﻴﺮ ﺍﻹﺳﻼﻡ ﻋﺑﺎﺳﻰ
- Born: 12 January 1943; Hazara, British India
- Died: 30 July 2009 (aged 66); Rawalpindi, Pakistan
- Military career
- Allegiance: Pakistan
- Branch: Pakistan Army
- Service years: 1963–1995
- Rank: Major General
- Nickname: Zaheer bhai
- Unit: Baloch Regiment
- Commands: 14th Infantry Brigade, Siachen; Director General Infantry Corps (DGIC); Defence Attaché of Pakistan to India
- Conflicts: Indo-Pakistani War of 1965; Indo-Pakistani War of 1971; Indo-Pakistani War of 1984; Soviet–Afghan War; 1995 Pakistani coup d'état attempt
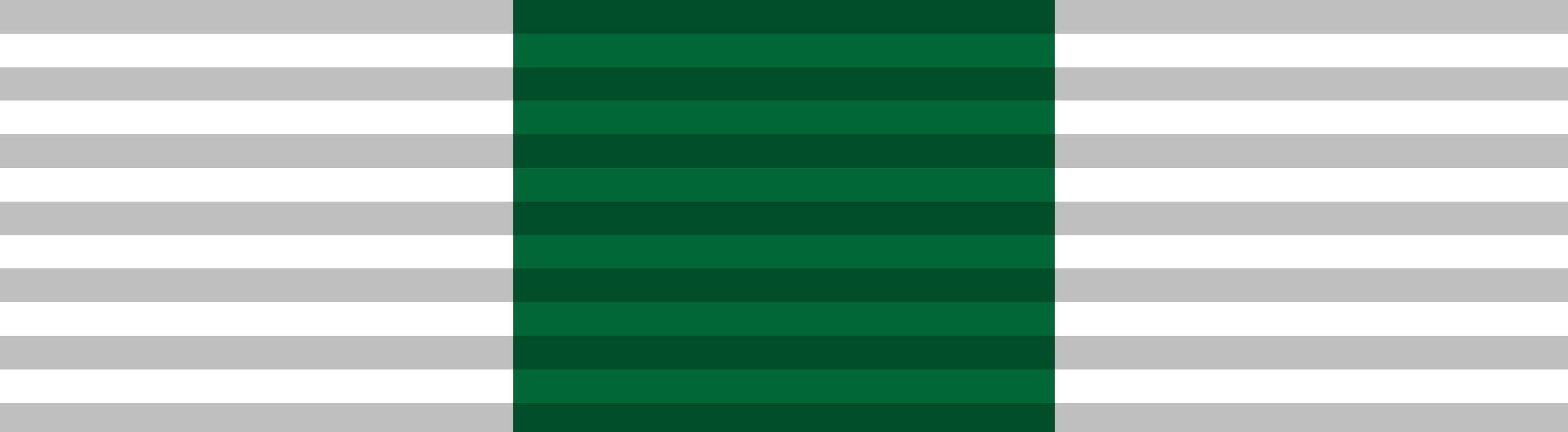
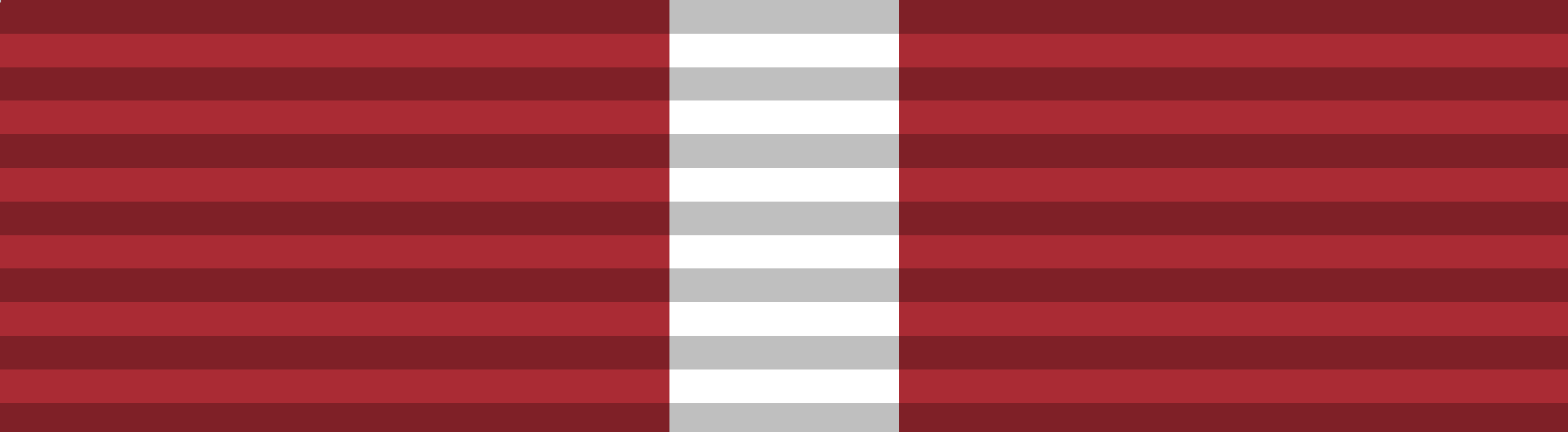
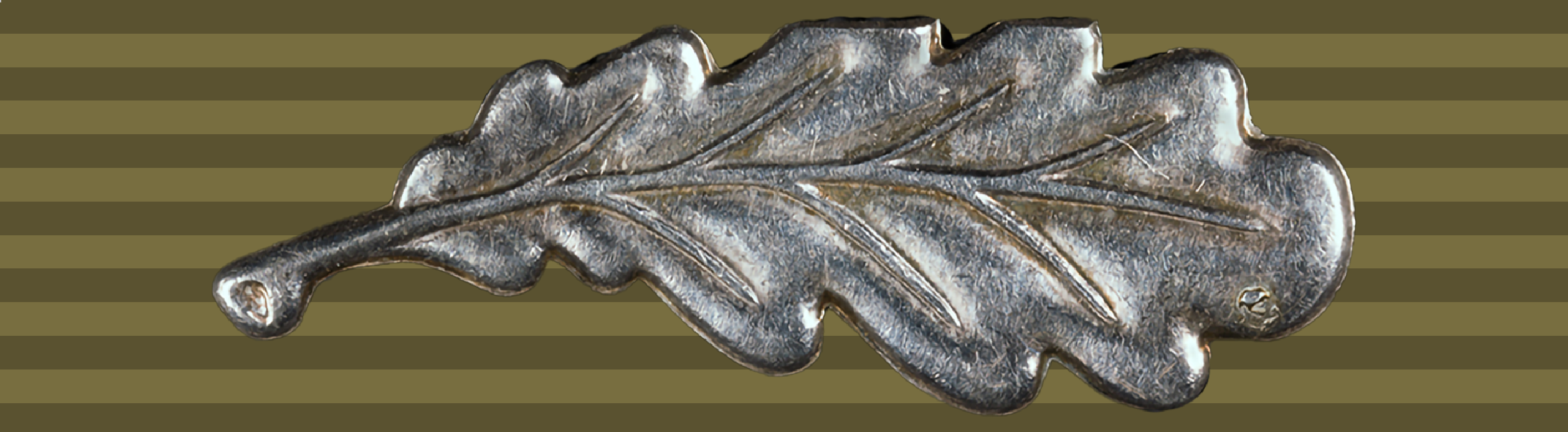
- Awards: Sitara-e-Jurat; Sitara-i-Basalat; Tamgha-i-Khidmat; Hilal-i-Imtiaz; Imtiazi Sanad

Zahirul Islam Abbasi (Urdu: ظہیر الاسلام عباسی; 12 January 1943 – 30 July 2009) was a major general of the Pakistan Army. Serving in the Siachen region of the disputed territory of Kashmir, Abbasi planned and executed assaults on Indian Army posts. Abbasi was sentenced to 7 years imprisonment for being party to an attempted coup d'état against the civilian government of Benazir Bhutto in 1995 while he was still a serving major general. No political party was linked to this coup attempt as determined by the courts.

== Military and intelligence career ==
Abbasi was commissioned into the Baloch Regiment of the Pakistan Army around 1963. As a captain in the army, he was appointed the adjutant of Cadet College Petaro in 1966. He served in that position until 1969. In 1972, he married Shahida Zaheer, daughter of A.A. Shaikh, who was the principal at Cadet College Petaro. Zaheer ul Islam Abbasi had four children – two sons and two daughters.

Abbasi participated in the 1971 war against India on the western front. His overall performance was rated very high and he rose up through the ranks to become a Brigadier general by the mid-1980s. Abbasi remained a part of the military establishment as long as he was in service with no links to any political or religious groups as per the tradition of the army.

Abbasi worked as an intelligence and military officer in liaison with Afghan Mujahideen resisting the Soviet occupation of Afghanistan (1980–1986). In 1987–1988, Brigadier Abbasi served as the military attaché at the Pakistani embassy in New Delhi, India. On December 1, 1988, New Delhi police arrested Abbasi during a meeting with an alleged Indian contact. The Indian government declared him persona non grata and expelled him from India.

== Siachen assault ==
In April 1984, the Siachen conflict broke out between India and Pakistan, leading to a war-like situation that has lasted since then. Thousands of Pakistani and Indian soldiers were killed in high-altitude warfare. As a Brigadier, Abbasi was deployed as a unit commander in the Siachen area in 1991. Abbasi opposed the restraint imposed by the army under prime minister Nawaz Sharif, and planned an assault with a group of army officers. Striving to seize key posts. Abbasi and his allies were removed from their posts by army chief Gen. Asif Nawaz.

== Coup attempt ==
Dropped from further promotion in the army command and due to dissatisfaction with the affairs in the country, Major General Abbasi allegedly plotted a coup against the civilian government of prime minister Benazir Bhutto and the army chief Gen. Abdul Waheed Kakar in 1995. At the time of the attempted coup, Abbasi held the post of director-general of Infantry Corps at the Army General Headquarters GHQ – a staff position where he did not command any troops. Attempting to gather a group of senior officers and military commanders, Abbasi was accused of planning to assassinate Bhutto, Kakar, senior cabinet ministers and the military chiefs and proclaim the establishment of Islamic law in Pakistan, and taking over the government.

The plot was foiled when it was uncovered by Lt. Gen. Ali Kuli Khan, then Director General Military Intelligence (DGMI). The coup plotters were arrested, and following a court-martial, Abbasi was moved to the civilian central prison at Haripur in Khyber Pakhtunkhwa.

According to one of the earliest reports, "Diplomats and politicians in Islamabad tell a different story. They say the arrested officers were not planning a coup, but were supplying arms to separatists fighting in Indian Kashmir. Bhutto, these sources say, was responding to pressure from Washington to crack down on military support to the rebels in violation of official policy. The U.S. has been seeking a solution to the Kashmir dispute and is eager to see an end to tensions between Islamabad and New Delhi."

With one of the co-conspirators Qari Saifullah turning an "approver" (government witness), the military court determined that Abbasi was not the main plotter in the attempted coup and was therefore given a lighter sentence of only 7 years as compared to the other army officers like Brigadier Mustansir Billah who were convicted for terms up to 14 years. The coup was not considered serious enough to grant a death sentence to any of the plotters. Qari Saifullah was not convicted as a part of the deal with the government for his becoming a witness.

== Release ==
Abbasi's imprisonment started in 1995 and he was to remain in prison for 7 years, i.e. until 2002. During his period of imprisonment, Abbasi lodged an appeal to Supreme Court of Pakistan in 1997 for a review of his case. With his military career over, Abbasi moved to organise a political party with the aim of creating awareness and establishing the rule of Islamic law through constitutional change. Abbasi formed another political party called the Azmat-e-Islam Bedar Pakistan party with the same objectives.

== See also ==
- 1995 Pakistani coup d'état attempt
- Zia-ul-Haq's Islamization
- Benazir Bhutto
- Islamism
- Siachen conflict
- History of the Kashmir conflict
- History of Pakistan
- Inter-Services Intelligence
- Pakistani Armed Forces
- Cadet College Petaro

== Sources ==
- "Pakistan Attache Is Arrested By India on Spying Charges". The New York Times. December 1, 1988.
- AsiaWeek
- Strategic Affairs Analysis
