= Mustansir Billah =

Pakistani Army general

Brigadier Mustansir Billah
- Military career
- Allegiance: Pakistan
- Branch: Pakistan Army
- Service years: till 1995
- Rank: Brigadier
- Commands: Deputy Military Secretary at GHQ

YouTube information
- Channel: Mustansir Billah
- Years active: 2019–present
- Subscribers: 144
- Views: 6300
- Last updated: 9 June 2026

Brigadier Mustansir Billah (Urdu: مستنصر بالله) is a former general of the Pakistan Army. He was sentenced to 14 years imprisonment for being party to an attempted coup d'état in 1995 against the civilian government of Benazir Bhutto while he was still a serving Brigadier general. No political party was linked to this coup attempt as determined by the courts.

Brigadier Mustansar Billah, Deputy Military Secretary at GHQ was the alleged mastermind behind the 1995 Pakistani coup d'etat attempt.

== Military career ==
In 1995, he plotted a coup against the Government of Benazir Bhutto along with Major General Zahirul Islam Abbasi. The coup named Operation Khalifa aimed at taking over the GHQ at the time of a Corps Commanders’ Conference, by eliminating key commanders, and then taking over the country with the ultimate objective of imposing a Taliban-style Sunni government.

== Imprisonment and release ==
After the coup failed, He was court-martialed and imprisoned for 14 years in 1995 and released in 2009.

== See also ==
- 1995 Pakistani coup d'état attempt
- Zia-ul-Haq's Islamization
- Benazir Bhutto
- Islamism
- History of Pakistan
- Pakistani Armed Forces
