= Fifteenth Amendment to the Constitution of Pakistan =

Amendment to the Pakistani constitution

The Fifteenth Amendment bill to the Constitution of Pakistan (Urdu: آئین پاکستان میں پندرھویں ترمیم) was an unsuccessful proposed amendment to the Constitution of Pakistan. The bill lapsed after failing to clear the parliament. While the National Assembly of Pakistan passed the bill on 28 August 1998, it was never approved by the Senate, preventing it from becoming law.

== Amendments ==
The proposed amendments included addition of a new article 2B in the constitution, and amendment in Article 239 of the Constitution of Pakistan. It also sought to impose Sharia Law as supreme law in Pakistan, in light of the Objective Resolution of Pakistan. In addition to the Quran and Sunnah as is in the Constitution of Pakistan till today.

== Text ==
Addition of new Article 2B in the Constitution: In the Constitution of the Islamic Republic of Pakistan, hereinafter referred to as the said Constitution, after Article 2A, the following new Article shall be inserted, namely: 2B

- The Holy Quran and Sunnah of the Holy Prophet (peace be upon him) shall be the supreme law of Pakistan. Explanation:- In the application of this clause to the personal law of any Muslim sect, the expression "Quran and Sunnah" shall mean the Quran and Sunnah as interpreted by that sect.
- The Federal Government shall be under an obligation to take steps to enforce the Shariah, to establish salat, to administer zakat, to promote amr bil ma'roof and nahi anil munkar (to prescribe what is right and to forbid what is wrong), to eradicate corruption at all levels and to provide substantial socio-economic justice, in accordance with the principles of Islam, as laid down in the Holy Quran and Sunnah.
- The Federal Government may issue directives for the implementation of the provisions set out in clauses (1) and (2) and may take the necessary action against any state functionary for non-compliance of the said directives.
- Nothing contained in this Article shall affect the personal law, religious freedom, traditions or customs of non-Muslims and their status as citizens.
- The provisions of this Article shall have effect notwithstanding anything contained in the Constitution, any law or judgement of any Court".

Amendment of Article 239 of the Constitution:In the Constitution, in Article 239, after clause (3) the following new clauses shall be inserted, namely:

- (3A), Notwithstanding anything contained in clauses (1) to (3), a Bill to amend the Constitution providing for the removal of any impediment in the enforcement of any matter relating to Shariah and the implementation of the Injunctions of Islam may originate in either House and shall, if it is passed by a majority of the members voting in the House in which it originated, be transmitted to the other House; and if the Bill is passed without amendment by the majority of the members voting in the other House also, it shall be presented to the President for assent.
- (3B), If a Bill transmitted to a House under clause (3A) is rejected or is not passed within ninety days of its receipt or is passed with amendment it shall be considered in a joint sitting.
- (3C), If the Bill is passed by a majority of the members voting in the joint sitting, with or without amendment, it shall be presented to the President for assent.
- (3D), The President shall assent to the Bill presented to him under clause (3A) or clause (3C) within seven days of the presentation of the Bill".

== See also ==
- Zia-ul-Haq's Islamization
- Separation of powers
- Nawaz Sharif
- Benazir Bhutto
- Pervez Musharraf
- Amendments to the Constitution of Pakistan
