= Air Intelligence (Pakistan) =

Pakistan Air Force's intelligence agency

- نظامتِ فضائی سراغ رسانی پاکستان

Agency overview
- Formed: 1948
- Jurisdiction: Pakistan
- Headquarters: Air Force AHQ
- Employees: Classified
- Agency executive: Director-General
- Parent department: Pakistan Air Force

The Directorate General Air Intelligence, commonly known as Air Intelligence (AI), (Urdu: نظامتِ فضائی سراغ رسانی پاکستان) is the intelligence arm of the Pakistan Air Force. It is headquartered in Islamabad, Pakistan. It was established in 1948.

The AI is responsible for the formulation of the aerial intelligence picture, and participates in forging the overall intelligence view as part of the Intelligence Community of Pakistan. It operates several research and collection units, including the Technical Assistance Unit (formerly the Air Photography Unit) which analyses aerial photography, and the Zoom Unit which studies the procurement of new aircraft, and AI also works alongside the Military Intelligence and the Naval Intelligence as well as with the Inter-Services Intelligence.

AI is reportedly much active on Pakistan's western borders with major contribution in Counter intelligence/Counter Terrorism operations in western part and inside Afghanistan.

The Air Intelligence collects data from foreign Air forces and also conducts espionage on the Pakistan Air Forces officers in order to prevent mutinies, coups, as well as assessing an officer's capabilities before their promotion.
