= Military Intelligence (Pakistan) =

Intelligence agency of the Pakistan Army

Pakistan Army Military Intelligence
- Badge of Corps of Military Intelligence
- Active: March 1948; 78 years ago
- Country: Pakistan
- Branch: Pakistan Army
- Type: Combat service support
- Role: Military intelligence
- Size: Varies
- HQ/Garrison: Army GHQ in Rawalpindi, Punjab, Pakistan
- Colors Identification: White, Gold
- Anniversaries: 1948
- Engagements: Military history of Pakistan
- Decorations: Military Decorations of Pakistan military

Commanders
- Director-General: Maj Gen Adil Iftikhar Warraich
- Notable commanders: Field Marshal Asim Munir Lt-Gen. Jamshed Gulzar Kiani; Lt-Gen. Sarfraz Ali; Lt-Gen. Hamid Gul; Lt-Gen. Ali Kuli Khan Khattak; Lt-Gen. Mahmud Ahmed

Insignia
- War Flag

The Corps of Military Intelligence (CMI) (Urdu: پاکستانی ملٹری انٹیلیجنس), commonly known as the MI, is the intelligence agency of the Pakistan Army.

The MI provides assessments on capabilities of competing nations while its mission parameters includes to gather informations on identifying and eliminating sleeper cells, foreign agents, and other anti-state elements within Pakistan, including investigation of military espionage.

== Overview ==
The MI was established in March 1948 led by Colonel Mohamed Abdul Latif Khan, responsible for army counter intelligence and security, along with tactical and operational intelligence collection and analysis.

During its earlier times, the MI had strong ties with the British Army's Intelligence Corps through its British officers, and was specific to its army counterintelligence matters.

Even as of today, the MI reports directly to Army GHQ in Rawalpindi, and initially focused on the Indian military advancement in east and on the Taliban's insurgency in the western areas as of 2008.

The MI works in close coordination with the Air Intelligence and the Naval Intelligence in protecting the military interests of the country. Its mission also includes to complete security clearances of the army officers working on sensitive assignments within the Pakistan Army. The education, training, and qualification for its personnel to be part of the MI is provided by its School of Military Intelligence that is based in Karachi Cantonment, Sindh, Pakistan.

The MI is directed by the Director-General at the active-duty senior two-star ranking Major-General who usually works under the Chief of the General Staff at the Army GHQ in Rawalpindi, Punjab in Pakistan.

== Director-Generals ==
S#.	Name	From	to
	Major General Ali Kuli Khan Khattak	1994	1995
	Major General Mehmood Ahmed	1995	1996
	Major General Ehsan ul Haq	1996	1997
	Major General Tariq Majid	April 2001	December 2003
	Major General Nadeem Taj	December 2003	February 2005
	Major General Mian Nadeem Ijaz Ahmed	February 2005	April 2008
	Major General Muhammad Asif	April 2008	2010
	Major General Naushad Ahmed Kayani	2010	2013
	Major General Sarfraz Sattar	2013	2015
	Major General Nadeem Zaki Manj	2015	2016
	Major General Asim Munir	December 2016	October 2018
	Major General Sarfraz Ali	October 2018	February 2020
	Major General Azhar Waqas	February 2020	September 2022
	Major General Iftikhar Hassan Chaudhry	September 2022	February 2023
	Major General Wajid Aziz	February 2023	September 2026
	Major General Adil Iftikhar Warraich	September 2026	Incumbent

== See also ==
- The Establishment (Pakistan)
- Air Intelligence (Pakistan)
- Naval Intelligence (Pakistan)
