= Ashar Aziz =

Pakistani–American electrical engineer, business executive, and philanthropist

- اشعر عزیز
- Born: Ashar Aziz Butt; 1959 (age 66–67); Karachi, Sindh, Pakistan
- Education: University of California, Berkeley; Massachusetts Institute of Technology; Middle East Technical University
- Occupations: Electrical engineer; business executive; philanthropist
- Years active: 1981–present
- Title: Founder and CEO of FireEye; Chairman of Sky Electric
- Parent(s): Asghar Butt (father); Nisar Aziz (mother)
- Relatives: Sartaj Aziz (uncle); Majid Nizami (uncle)
- Awards: Ernst & Young Entrepreneur of the Year Award; Sitara-i-Imtiaz

Ashar Aziz (Urdu: اشعر عزیز; born 1959) is a Pakistani–American electrical engineer, business executive, and philanthropist. He is best known as the founder of Silicon Valley–based cybersecurity company FireEye. A former billionaire, Aziz had an estimated net worth of over $233 million as of 2015.

== Early life and education ==
Aziz was born in Karachi in 1959 and grew up in Islamabad, Pakistan. He arrived in the United States as a student, having gained admission into the Massachusetts Institute of Technology School of Engineering (MIT). Prior to entering MIT, he completed two years of foundation studies at the Middle East Technical University (METU) in Turkey during the mid-1970s. He graduated from MIT with a Bachelor of Science in electrical engineering in 1981, followed by a Master of Science in computer science from the University of California, Berkeley, where he was also granted a Regents' Fellowship.

== Career ==
=== Sun Microsystems ===
Aziz worked as an engineer at Sun Microsystems for twelve years, specialising in computer networking, network security, and system design. He also served as chief technology officer of the N1 program at Sun. In 1999, he founded his first startup company Terraspring Inc., which focused on data center automization and virtualization. The business was bought by Sun Microsystems in 2002, following the stock market crash of 2001.

=== FireEye ===
At around the same time, Aziz began studying the risks stemming from highly stealthy and self-propagating malware systems, and the threats they posed to future cybersecurity infrastructures—a problem he first discovered in the U.S. Department of Defense archives. In 2004, he founded FireEye, having become convinced that he could provide the solutions to these emerging cybersecurity challenges. He initially worked out of his home for 80 to 100 hours a week, with only $4,000 in his personal savings. Initially, most of his technical team comprised engineers and technology professionals he knew from his previous startup. Based in Milpitas, California, the company today provides both software and cloud-based anti-malware products. According to the MIT Department of Electrical Engineering and Computer Science, "the core of the FireEye platform is a virtual execution engine, complemented by dynamic threat intelligence, to identify and block cyber attacks in real time and across the different stages of an attack life cycle." Describing FireEye in 2012, Aziz stated that the company's objective was to strengthen the "security and key infrastructure that is pervasive across financial, government and credit card infrastructure to protect from three very important threats: crime, espionage, and warfare." Aziz served as FireEye's chief executive officer from 2004 to 2012, as well as remaining its chief strategy officer, chief technology officer and board vice chairman.

Before you even have an idea, think about how you construct it – backwards – from the problem. Once you have reverse engineered the solution, you have to validate it with a potential customer.

— Aziz addressing Start6 engineering students at MIT's Department of Electrical Engineering and Computer Science, 2015.

In December 2012, Aziz stepped down as CEO and former McAfee CEO David DeWalt was appointed to the position. DeWalt was recruited in order to prepare the company for an initial public offering (IPO). The following year, FireEye raised an additional $50 million in venture capital, bringing its total funding to $85 million. In September 2013, FireEye went public, raising $300 million. Aziz's shares in FireEye skyrocketed as the company acquired an asset valuation of over $1 billion. According to Forbes, he owned 11 million shares in the company and his personal net worth had increased to just over $1 billion. However, the Business Insider explained the appreciation in Aziz's net worth was temporary due to the high fluctuations in share prices, dropping his stake worth to under $1 billion once prices dropped. According to The Wall Street Journal, FireEye was the second-best performing firm in the U.S. that went public in 2013. Aziz was inducted into the Forbes' list of billionaires for 2014.

As the inventor of FireEye's malware protection system, Aziz currently holds over 80 patents relating to various cybersecurity technologies, including in the fields of network security, cryptography, and data center virtualization. He is recognized as the technical visionary and pioneer behind FireEye's core technology. In August 2016, it was announced that Aziz had tendered his resignation from FireEye in order to spend more time with his family, and focus on solar energy distribution projects in developing countries. A partner of FireEye described the news as "disconcerting" for FireEye's future and its workforce, and predicted his exit would accelerate discussions on a potential sale of the company. However, a FireEye source dismissed this notion, stating the company would operate under its new CEO and continue to provide solutions using its multi-vector virtual execution (MVX) technology. The source also clarified that Aziz felt he was leaving the company in "good hands", and that he was still a shareholder in FireEye.

=== SkyElectric Inc. ===
Aziz is the founding CEO of SkyElectric Inc., a company which seeks to provide affordable and sustainable solar energy solutions. In February 2017, he pitched solar energy as the solution to Pakistan's electricity crisis and launched his company's operations in the country.

== Philanthropy ==
He is a member of the board of governors of Namal Institute, founded by Imran Khan. In January 2020, he inaugurated the Nisar Aziz Agri-Tech Center at Namal Institute at Namal. Named after his mother, the center would assist in the development of a "robust agricultural economy through technology" by promoting low-cost agricultural practices, and providing agricultural education to farmers in Pakistan.

== Personal life ==
Aziz's father, Asghar Butt, was a journalist, writer and playwright, who served as the deputy editor of the Pakistani broadsheet The Nation. His father died aged 91 at his hometown Lahore, Punjab, on 13 November 2012.

Aziz's mother, Nisar Aziz, was an eminent Urdu novelist and literary figure who belonged to a Pashtun family from Mardan. She died aged 93 on 7 February 2020. The economist and politician Sartaj Aziz is his maternal uncle. The Nation's editor-in-chief, Majid Nizami, was his father's brother-in-law and thus his uncle. Ashar has one brother, Ahmar Aziz Butt, who is a doctor.

Aziz is a recipient of the Ernst & Young Entrepreneur of the Year Award. In 2018, he was presented the civil award Sitara-i-Imtiaz by the government of Pakistan for his contributions to the IT industry.
