= Nadir Ali =

Nadir Ali (Arabic: نادر علی) is a male Muslim given name. Notable people with the name include:

- Nadir Ali (comedian) (born 1991), Pakistani YouTube personality, Comedian
- Nadir Ali Shah (1897–1974), Pakistani sufi saint of the Qalandariyya
