= List of Pakistani YouTubers =

YouTubers are people mostly known for their work on the video sharing website YouTube. The following is a list of Pakistani YouTubers for whom Wikipedia has articles either under their own name or their YouTube channel name. This list excludes people who, despite having a YouTube presence, are primarily known for their work elsewhere.

User(s)	Channel(s)	Category
Adil Raja	Soldier Speaks	Political commentary and journalism
Abrar Hassan	Wild Lens by Abrar	Travel and adventure vlogging
Imran Riaz Khan	Imran Riaz Khan	Journalist, vlogging, and TV anchor
Sajid Ali	Zalmi	Adventure, Surviving
Amin Hafeez	Hafeez	Journalist and political analyst
Nadir Ali	P 4 Pakao	Comedy and Vlog videos
Mubashir Saddique	Village Food Secrets	Food vlogging
Muhammad Ali Mirza	Engineer Muhammad Ali Mirza - Official Channel	Islam-related topics
Orya Maqbool Jan	Orya Maqbool Jan	Pakistani journalist, columnist and anchor person
Farhan Rana Rajpoot	Farhan Rana Rajpoot	Pakistani film director and Youtuber
