= Naeem Khalid Lodhi =

Pakistani general

Federal Minister for National Security
- Caretaker
- In office 27 June 2018 – 18 August 2018
- Preceded by: Abdullah Hussain Haroon
- Succeeded by: Moeed W. Yusuf

Minister for Defence Production
- Caretaker
- In office 27 June 2018 – 16 August 2018
- Preceded by: Usman Ibrahim
- Succeeded by: Zubaida Jalal Khan

CEO Fauji Fertilizer Company
- In office March 2012 – March 2015
- Preceded by: Malik Arif Hayat
- Succeeded by: Shafqaat Ahmed

Defence Secretary of Pakistan
- In office 28 November 2011 – 11 January 2012
- Preceded by: Syed Athar Ali
- Succeeded by: Nargis Sethi

Commander XXXI Corps
- In office October 2009 – March 2011
- Preceded by: Muhammad Haroon Aslam
- Succeeded by: Muhammad Yousaf

Personal details
- Education: Pakistan Command and Staff College; National Defence University
- Awards: Hilal-i-Imtiaz

Military service
- Allegiance: Pakistan
- Branch/service: Pakistan Army
- Years of service: 1974-2011
- Rank: Lieutenant General
- Unit: Corps of Engineers

Naeem Khalid Lodhi is a retired three-star rank general who after retirement has also served as the Federal Minister for National Security, Minister for Defence Production, CEO Fauji Fertilizer Company.

== Early life and education ==
Lodhi earned a Bachelor of Science in Civil Engineering. He later attended the Command and Staff College in Quetta and the National Defence University in Islamabad. He also holds a master's degree in International Relations.

== Military career ==
He was commissioned in the Army on 27 October 1974 in the Corps of Engineers.

He has served on various command, staff, and instructional assignments in his career in the Army including the important appointments of Directing Staff at the National Defence University, Pakistan, Commander Corps Engineers, Director General Engineering Directorate, Director General Staff Duties Directorate, General Officer Commanding Bahawalpur, General Headquarters Rawalpindi and Corps Commander Bahawalpur. On account of his distinguished military service, he has been conferred the award of Hilal-i-Imtiaz (M).

He retired from the army in March 2011.

== Civil service and business career ==
Following his retirement from military service, Lodhi was appointed as the Defence Secretary of Pakistan on 28 November 2011. However, he was dismissed on 11 January 2012 by Prime Minister Yousuf Raza Gilani amid the political tensions related to the "Memogate" affair, a case that strained civil-military relations at the time. He was replaced by Nargis Sethi on 12 January 2012.

In April 2012, Lodhi was appointed Managing Director and CEO of Fauji Fertilizer Company (FFC), one of Pakistan’s largest fertiliser manufacturers. During his tenure, he also held directorships at FFC Energy Limited, Fauji Meat Limited, and other subsidiaries. In more recent years he was working in an engineering firm, H-Cube Pvt Ltd., as a consultant and adviser.

== Political career ==
In the caretaker federal cabinet formed ahead of Pakistan’s 2018 general elections, Lodhi served as the Minister for National Security and Defence Production. His term began on 27 June 2018 and ended in August 2018.

== Writings, media presence and public advocacy ==
Lodhi is a regular commentator on defence and strategic affairs and contributes opinion pieces to national publications. He also frequently appears on television as a defence analyst. In April 2024, he launched a reconciliation initiative aimed at easing tensions among Pakistan’s political parties, judiciary, and military, calling for mutual respect and institutional harmony.

Some of his articles and columns include:

=== English ===
- In Narratives Magazine: “Armed Forces’ Reforms Agenda” (29 January 2023), in which he outlines a comprehensive strategy to modernize Pakistan’s military—calling for institutional restructuring, efficiency improvements, and a hybrid-warfare command concept.
- In The Nation: “Short‑term immediate reconciliation: A path forward for political and institutional unity in Pakistan”, advocating for a national reconciliation framework amid political polarization.

=== Urdu ===
- Essay: “Bain ul Aqwami Khatarnak Khel Aur Pakistan” (“Dangerous International Games and Pakistan”), published on 1 May 2019, examining Pakistan’s strategic dilemmas in an evolving global context.

== Awards and decorations ==

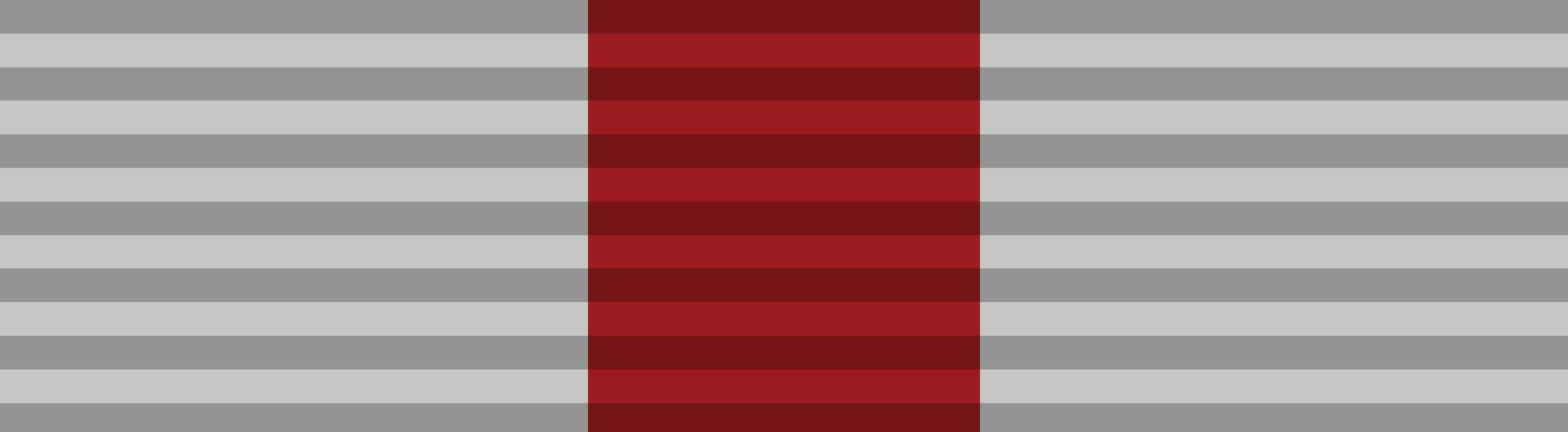

Hilal-e-Imtiaz (Military) (Crescent of Excellence)		Tamgha-e-Diffa (General Service Medal) Siachen Glacier Clasp 2002	
Tamgha-e-Baqa (Nuclear Test Medal) 1998	Tamgha-e-Istaqlal Pakistan (Escalation with India Medal) 2002	Hijri Tamgha (Medal of Conviction) (1979)	10 Years Service Medal
20 Years Service Medal	30 Years Service Medal	35 Years Service Medal	Jamhuriat Tamgha (Democracy Medal) 1988
Qarardad-e-Pakistan Tamgha (Resolution Day Golden Jubilee Medal) 1990	Tamgha-e-Salgirah Pakistan (Independence Day Golden Jubilee Medal) 1997	Command & Staff College Quetta Student's Medal	Tamgha-e-Sad Saala Jashan-e- Wiladat-e-Quaid-e-Azam (100th Birth Anniversary of Muhammad Ali Jinnah) 1976
