= Muhammad Zubair Umar =

Pakistani politician

Mohammad Zubair Umar

29th Governor of Sindh
- In office 2 February 2017 – 3 August 2018
- President: Mamnoon Hussain
- Preceded by: Saeeduzzaman Siddiqui; Agha Siraj Durrani (Acting)
- Succeeded by: Imran Ismail; Agha Siraj Durrani (Acting)

Chairman Privatization Commission of Pakistan (Minister of State)
- In office 18 December 2013 – 2 February 2017

Chairman Board of Investment
- In office 12 July 2013 – 17 December 2013

Personal details
- Party: PMLN (2007-2024)
- Relatives: Asad Umar (brother)
- Education: MBA
- Alma mater: Institute of Business Administration

Mohammad Zubair Umar (Urdu: محمد زبیر عمر) is a Pakistani politician who served as 32nd Governor of Sindh from February 2017 to August 2018. Once a prominent leader of the Pakistan Muslim League (N), he served as the chairman of Privatisation Commission of Pakistan with the status of State Minister from 2013 to 2017. He also served as Chief Spokesperson to former prime minister Nawaz Sharif as well to his daughter Maryam Nawaz.

== Early life and education ==
Umar was born in Abbottabad, Khyber Pakhtunkhwa to Major General (retd) Ghulam Umar, and was raised in Karachi; he belongs to a Punjabi family with pre-partition roots in Patiala (current-day Punjab, India). His father was an army officer who was regarded as a close associate of President Yahya Khan and served as the first Advisor to the National Security Council (NSC), established during Yahya Khan's administration. Zubair is elder brother to Asad Umar who was a prominent leader of Imran Khan's Pakistan Tehreek-e-Insaf. Another brother, Muneer Kamal, is also a finance graduate who has worked in the corporate sector.

He received his master's degree in business administration from Institute of Business Administration (IBA) in 1981. At IBA, he became the member of the board of directors in 1980 and taught financial management from 1981 to 1986.

== Professional career ==
After completing his MBA, Umar joined IBM from 1981 until his resignation in 2007, as he projected to participate in politics. Within IBM, he served in various financial and managerial roles over a span of more than 26 years. He held postings in cities including Rome, Milan, Paris, and Dubai. In 1998, he was appointed chief financial officer (CFO) for IBM Pakistan, and in 2004, he was promoted to CFO of IBM’s Middle East/Africa region.

== Media career ==
Prior to his formal entry into politics, Umar engaged in media-related activities. He hosted television programs focusing on economic and financial issues, leveraging his extensive corporate experience to provide insights into Pakistan's economic landscape.

== Political career ==
=== Pakistan Muslim League (N) (2007-2024) ===
He joined the PML-N in 2007 and became part of the PML-N's Economic, Tax Reforms Media Committees in 2012.

Umar was chairman of the Pakistan Board of Investment from 12 July 2013 to 17 December 2013.

He served as Chairman of Privatisation Commission of Pakistan with the status of minister of state from December 2013 until February 2017.

In January 2017, he was appointed as the 32nd Governor of Sindh. He took the oath of office in February 2017.

Following the 2018 Pakistani general election, he resigned from the office of Sindh Governor on 28 July 2018. His resignation was accepted on 3 August 2018.

He left the PML(N) on 9 June 2024. He explained that "the differences were too vast", citing examples such as the no-confidence motion against Imran Khan, the performance of the first Shehbaz Sharif ministry, and the 2024 Pakistani general election.

=== Reports of joining Pakistan Tehreek-e-Insaf ===
In June 2025, it was reported that Umar had reportedly decided to join Pakistan Tehreek-e-Insaf (PTI) after parting ways with PML-N. According to news reports, internal consultations within PTI took place regarding his potential inclusion, and the party's founder Imran Khan reportedly gave the green light for his induction.

== Controversies ==
=== Leaked sextape (2021) ===
On 26 September 2021 sexually explicit videos were posted online by anonymous sources that allegedly show Umar with at least one unidentified woman in one of Islamabad's rest houses. The other woman was speculated to be Gharida Farooqi since the woman in the video was also wearing the same pajamas as Gharidah did on her live TV show. Umar and his party (PMLN) leaders claimed the videos were doctored and fake, however, neither he or his party approached the court.
