= Mooroo =

Pakistani YouTuber, Actor

Taimoor Salahuddin
- Born: Lahore, Punjab, Pakistan
- Other name: Mooroo
- Education: Aitchison College
- Years active: 2006–present
- Known for: Pehli (album), Sayay, comedy vlogs, filmmaking
- Spouse: Eruj Hadi (m. 2019)

YouTube information
- Channel: Taimoor Salahuddin aka Mooroo
- Years active: 2011–present
- Subscribers: 1.18 million
- Views: 124 million
- Last updated: October 2025

Taimoor Salahuddin (Urdu: تیمور صلاح الدین), better known by his online alias Mooroo, is a Pakistani YouTuber, writer, internet personality, filmmaker, actor and musician.

He is known primarily for his comedic YouTube sketches, short films and vlogs, and is regarded as one of the pioneers of vlogging in Pakistan.

In addition to YouTube, Mooroo has released original music albums including Pehli and several singles such as Sayay. He has also acted in web series and television projects, and continues to work as a director and content creator.

As of May 2025, his YouTube channel has over 1.17 million subscribers and more than 122 million views.

== Biography ==
Taimoor Salahuddin was born in Lahore, Punjab, Pakistan. He studied at Aitchison College for his O-Levels and later attended Beaconhouse National University.

He began his career in 2006 with independent filmmaking projects before moving to YouTube in 2011, where his sketches, travel vlogs and short films gained popularity. Over time, he became one of Pakistan's earliest and most prominent digital creators.

In addition to content creation, Mooroo is also a musician. He has released several singles and an album titled Pehli, blending pop, folk and experimental sounds. He has since expanded into acting, directing and music production.

== Personal life ==
In an interview, Mooroo shared that his stage name came from his sister mispronouncing “Taimoor” as “Moor” or “Mooroo”.

He married Eruj Hadi, an art director, in January 2019. The marriage received widespread media attention, with online discussions about stereotypes of complexion in Pakistan. Mooroo later clarified that he married for love and not to make any social statement.

== Discography ==
Single (music)
| Year | Song | Artists | Role | Ref. |
|---|---|---|---|---|
| 2020 | Tum Tum | Asim Azhar, Young Stunners, Shamoon Ismail & RAAMIS | Featured | |

=== Album ===
| Year | Title | Role | Ref. |
|---|---|---|---|
| 2015 | Pehli | Main Artist | |

== Filmography ==
In 2022, Mooroo appeared in Hum TV's Ramadan Special series Paristan as his debut, where he portrayed the self created character of Amanullah opposite Mira Sethi.

In 2024, he voice-overed Vincent Oliver, one of the main male characters in the animated film The Glassworker.

== Awards and nominations ==
| Year | Recipient/Nominated work | Award | Result |
|---|---|---|---|
| 2013 | "Kahani Purani" | Lux Style Awardfor Song of the Year | Nominated |
| 2013 | "Mooroo" | Lux Style Award for Best Emerging Talent | Nominated |
| 2013 | "Awam" | Lux Style Award for Best Music Video Director | Nominated |
| 2014 | "Itni Chikni" | Lux Style Award for Best Music Video Director | Nominated |
| 2014 | "Tere Bina" | Youth Festival Award for Voice of the Year | Won |

=== Other awards ===
| Year | Award | Category | Result | Ref. |
|---|---|---|---|---|
| 2021 | Pakistan International Screen Awards (PISA) | Vlogger of the year | Nominated | |
| 2020 | Pakistan International Screen Awards (PISA) | Best Vlogger | Nominated | |

== See also ==
List of Pakistani YouTubers
