= Sartaj Aziz =

Pakistani economist and strategist (1929–2021)

- سرتاج عزیز
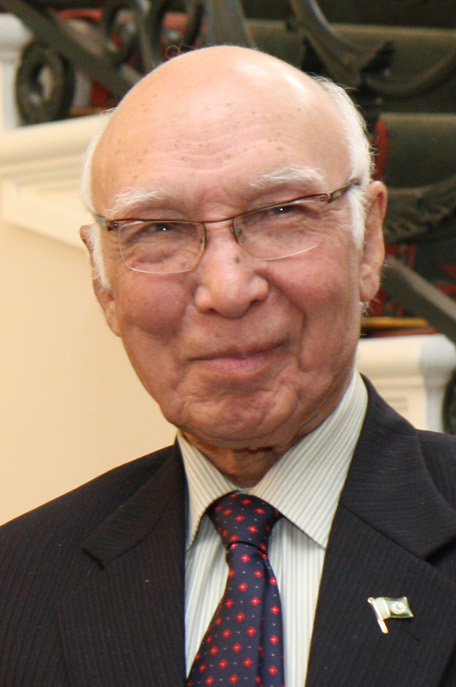
- Aziz in 2014

Adviser to the Prime Minister on Foreign Affairs
- In office 7 June 2013 – 28 July 2017
- President: Mamnoon Hussain
- Prime Minister: Nawaz Sharif
- Preceded by: Hina Rabbani; (as Foreign Minister)
- Succeeded by: Khawaja Muhammad Asif; (as Foreign Minister)
- In office 7 August 1998 – 12 October 1999
- President: Rafiq Tarar
- Prime Minister: Nawaz Sharif
- Preceded by: Gohar Ayub-Khan
- Succeeded by: Abdul Sattar

6th National Security Advisor
- In office 7 June 2013 – 23 October 2015
- President: Mamnoon Hussain
- Prime Minister: Nawaz Sharif
- Preceded by: Mahmud Ali Durrani
- Succeeded by: Naseer Khan Janjua

Minister of Finance
- In office 25 February 1997 – 6 August 1998
- President: Rafiq Tarar; Farooq Leghari
- Prime Minister: Nawaz Sharif
- Preceded by: Naveed Qamar
- Succeeded by: Ishaq Dar
- In office 26 May 1993 – 18 July 1993
- Prime Minister: Nawaz Sharif
- Preceded by: Farooq Leghari
- Succeeded by: Syed Babar Ali
- In office 7 August 1990 – 18 April 1993
- Prime Minister: Ghulam Mustafa Jatoi (Acting); Nawaz Sharif
- Preceded by: Benazir Bhutto
- Succeeded by: Farooq Leghari

Minister of State for Agriculture and Food Security
- In office 1984–1988
- Prime Minister: Muhammad Khan Junejo

Member of Senate from Islamabad Capital Territory
- In office March 1988 – 12 October 1999

Personal details
- Born: 7 February 1929 Mardan, British India (present day Khyber Pakhtunkhwa, Pakistan)
- Died: 2 January 2024 (aged 94) Islamabad, Pakistan
- Party: Pakistan Muslim League (N)
- Relations: Ashar Aziz (nephew)
- Education: University of the Punjab; Harvard University
- Occupation: Economist; politician
- Cabinet: First Sharif ministry (1990‍–‍1993); Second Sharif ministry (1997‍–‍1998); Third Sharif ministry (2013‍–‍2017)
- Awards: Tamgha-e-Pakistan (1959)

Sartaj Aziz (Urdu: سرتاج عزيز; 7 February 1929 – 2 January 2024) was a Pakistani economist and strategist, who had previously served as the deputy chairman of the Planning Commission of Pakistan, member of the federal cabinet as the de facto Minister for Foreign Affairs, a Federal Senator as well as the National Security Advisor.

Born in north-western British India, as a student Aziz was an activist in the Pakistan Movement. Aziz went on to study economics at Punjab University and later studied public administration at Harvard Kennedy School. He served as a civil servant from 1952 to 1971 within Pakistan's federal government, also serving as the joint secretary in the planning commission between 1967 and 1971. In 1971, Aziz joined the Food and Agriculture Organization and served as its Director of Commodities, later moving to the International Fund for Agricultural Development where he served as the Assistant President, Policy and Planning between December 1977 and April 1984.

Aziz returned to Pakistan in 1984 and served as a junior minister for Agriculture and Food Security until 1988 under the conservative Junejo administration. He was elected to the Senate of Pakistan in 1988 and re-elected in 1993 from the center-right PML-N, and served in both Sharif administrations first as the Minister of Finance from August 1990 to June 1993 and Minister of Foreign Affairs from August 1998 until 1999 coup d'état. He is noted as the only cabinet member who opposed the decision of conducting nuclear tests in response to India, citing 'economic reasons'. During his tenure as the Finance Minister he was noted a strong proponent of economic liberalization.

In 2004, he moved to academia, and became the vice-chancellor of Beaconhouse National University; he also taught at economics at the university. Aziz authored Between Dreams and Realities, which was published in 2009. He remained with the university until 2013, when he joined the Nawaz Sharif's third administration as an advisor in-charge of country's foreign policy; he also served as the National Security Advisor between 2013 and 2015.

== Early life and education ==
Sartaj Aziz was born in 1929 in a Sayyid Kakakhel family of Pashtuns in Nowshera, Khyber Pakhtunkhwa. In the 1940s, Aziz was a young activist in the Muslim League-led Pakistan movement. Aziz was educated at Islamia College of Lahore and then obtained a bachelor's degree in economics from the Punjab University in 1949. Aziz joined the civil service in 1950 and later traveled to the United States and earned a master's degree in development economics from Harvard University in 1963.

Returning to work in the government, he attained the position of joint secretary in the Planning Commission of Pakistan in 1967. Aziz later worked in the United Nations Food and Agriculture Organization from 1971 to 1975, and the International Fund for Agricultural Development from 1978 to 1984.

Ashar Aziz, a Pakistani-American electrical engineer, business executive, and former billionaire is Sartaj Aziz's maternal nephew.

== Political career ==
=== Indo-Pakistan conflicts ===
Sartaj Aziz joined the economic bureau of the Planning Commission in 1964, sitting in a bench where he attended the meeting with the Chairman of the Planning Commission, Economic minister Muhammad Shoaib, Foreign minister Zulfikar Ali Bhutto and the President Ayub Khan, to discuss the economic assessment of the Operation Gibraltar against India. According to Aziz, Bhutto had gone on a populist Anti-Indian and Anti-American binge during the meeting. Bhutto succeeded the President on spellbinding the ruling general into thinking he was becoming a world statesman fawned upon by the enemies of the United States. When authorising the Gibraltar, Deputy Chairman had famously told the President in the meeting, "Sir, I hope you realize that our foreign policy and our economic requirements are not fully consistent, in fact they are rapidly falling out of line". Aziz vetoed the Gibraltar against India, fearing the economic turmoil that would jolt the country's economy, but was rebuffed by his senior bureaucrats. In that meeting Bhutto convinced the President and the Economic minister that India would not attack Pakistan due to Kashmir as a disputed territory, and in Bhutto's mark: "Pakistan's incursion into Indian-occupied Kashmir, at [A]khnoor, would not provide [India] with the justification for attacking Pakistan across the international boundary "because Kashmir was a disputed territory". This theory proved wrong when India launched a full-scale war against West-Pakistan in 1965.

The war with India cost Pakistan an economical price, when Pakistan lost the half a billion dollars it had coming from the Consortium for Pakistan through the United States. Ayub Khan could not suffer the aftermath and fall from the presidency after surrendering the presidential power of Army Commander General Yahya Khan in 1969. Escalating the further crises, the country was floundered, losing East-Pakistan after Pakistan again attack India six years later, with the economy in great jeopardy without United States' assistance. Aziz was Chief, International Economic Section, in the Planning Division of the Government of Pakistan, during the 1971 conflicts with India.

=== Post nationalizations ===
Aziz did not join the government of Zulfikar Ali Bhutto but was hostile towards the issue of nationalisation. Aziz criticised Bhutto for intensifying the government control of the privatised mega-corporations, citing that "Bhutto's nationalization failed to make up for the "mismatch" between economic reality and policy formulation".

In 1984, Aziz joined the Military Government of President and Chief of Army Staff General Zia-ul-Haq as Minister of State for Food, Agriculture and Cooperatives. He was elected to the Senate of Pakistan from Khyber Pakhtunkhwa in 1985 elections and again in 1993 parliamentary elections. From 1988 to 1994, he served as senator from the capital territory of Islamabad in 1988. Having joined the Pakistan Muslim League (N), Aziz was appointed the minister of finance, planning and economic affairs in the first Nawaz Sharif ministry from 1990 to 1993. In 1993, he was appointed the secretary general of the party.

=== Finance minister (1997–98) ===
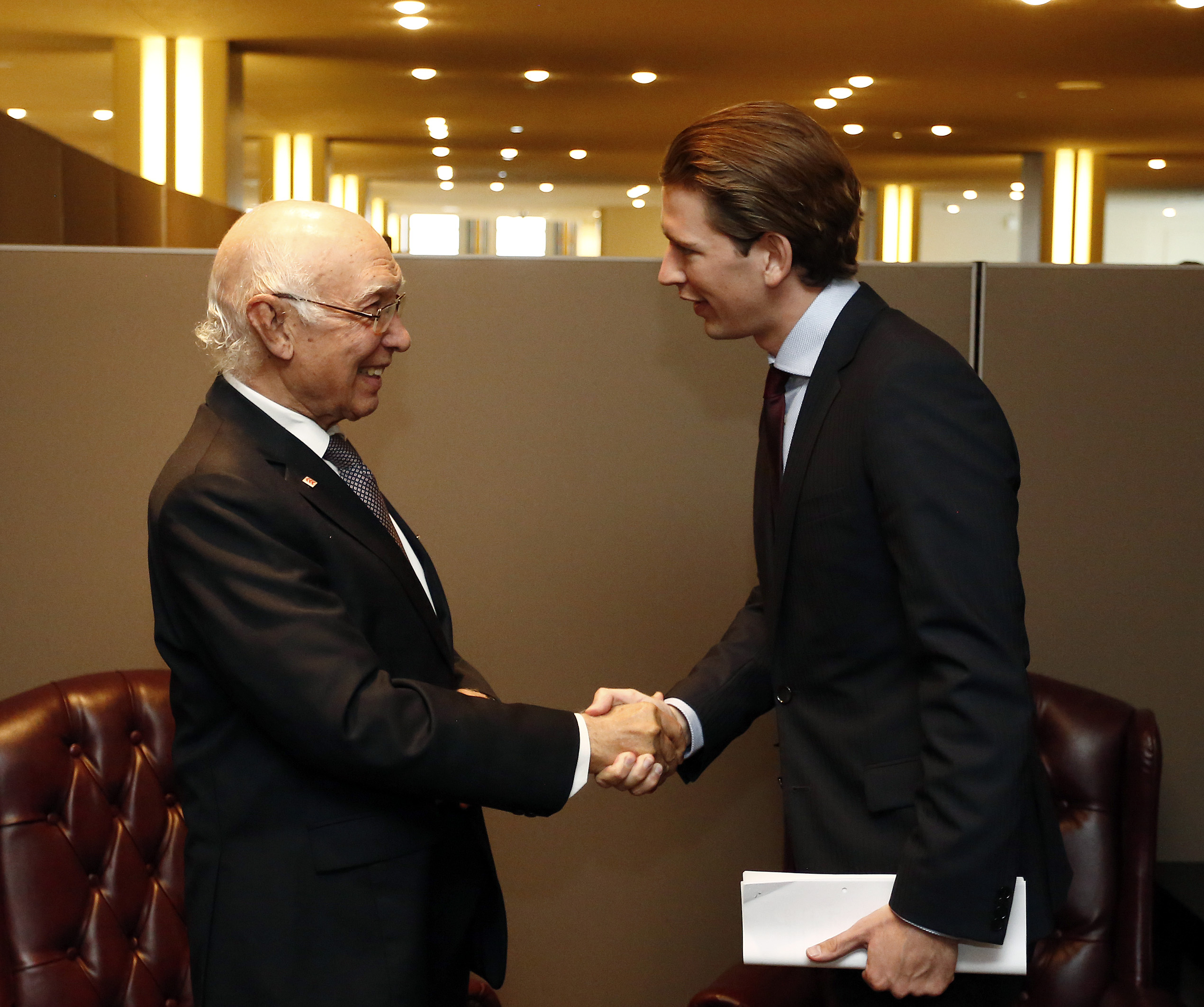
Aziz with Sebastian Kurz, the Austrian Minister for Foreign Affairs

After the PML (N)'s landslide victory in the 1997 parliamentary election, Aziz was re-appointed Treasure Minister, to lead the Ministry of Treasury, by Prime Minister Nawaz Sharif where he continued his privatisation policies. Aziz adopted the proposed economic theory of matching economic requirements with national strategy. Aziz was tasked with intensifying country's economic system more dependent on investment, privatisation and the economical integrals penetrating through the matters of national security.

Deepening economic imbalance will bring about a decisive shift in the balance of power between India and Pakistan and the idea was to recreate balance through deterrence

— Sartaj Aziz opposing the nuclear tests, 1998,

Aziz was extremely upset and frustrated after learning the Indian nuclear testing that took place in Pokhran Test Range of Indian Army in May 1998, through the media. The India's tests naming Pokhran-II — s codename of series of nuclear tests in May 1998— Sartaj Aziz prepared his economic proposals, requests and recommendation before meeting with the Prime Minister Nawaz Sharif. The meeting was chaired by the Prime minister with state-holders of all institutions (both scientific, military, civilians, and bureaucratic) attended the meeting calling for the suitable reply to India. At this meeting, Sartaj Aziz was the only senior minister in Pakistan's government who counseled against Pakistan carrying out its own nuclear tests – codename Chagai-I and Chagai-II, on grounds of the possible devastating impact of any subsequent international sanctions on Pakistan owing to the prevailing economic recession and low foreign exchange reserves. However, due to economical sanctions, Aziz briefly abandons his theory of matching economic requirements with national strategy. In 2001, Aziz later publicly supported the government's stance on conducting the tests, calling it a "right decision" at that time.

=== Foreign minister (1998–99) ===
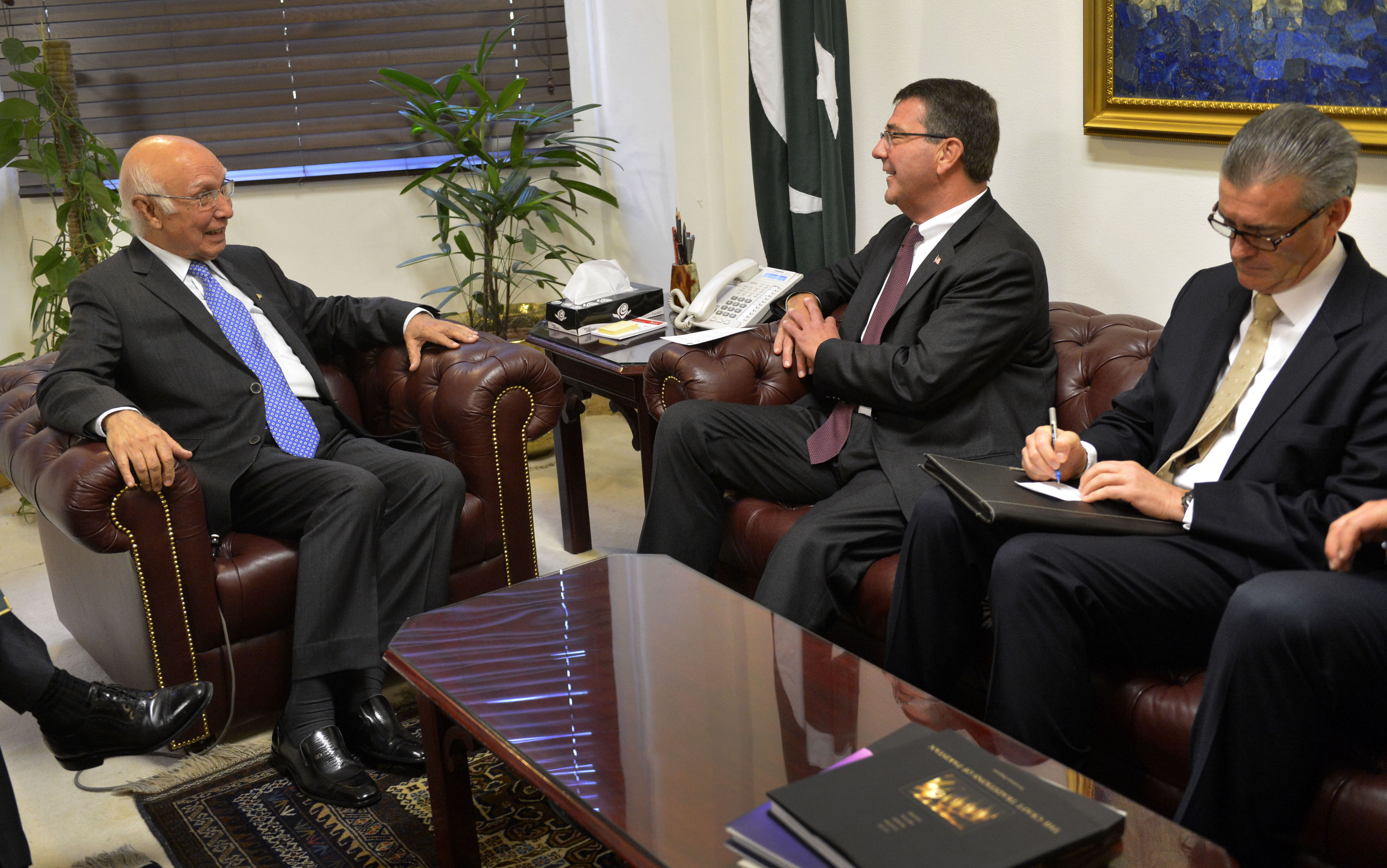
Ash Carter meets with Sartaj Aziz, 16 September 2013

Following a cabinet reshuffle in 1998, Aziz was appointed foreign minister but his term was cut short. During the 1999 Kargil War with India, Aziz travelled to the People's Republic of China to solicit support for Pakistan. He also travelled to India to hold talks with his counterpart, the Minister of External Affairs Jaswant Singh, but the talks were regarded as a failure and unsuccessful in stemming the conflict. Aziz claimed India had "overreacted", while India demanded that Pakistan stop the incursion into Indian-administered Kashmir. Aziz also represented Pakistan at the Organisation of the Islamic Conference in Burkina Faso, held during the Kargil conflict. Aziz later claimed in the media that Pakistan had achieved its aims in the Kargil conflict by "forcing the Kashmir dispute to the top of the global agenda." He remained Foreign Minister of Pakistan till October 1999.

His term ended abruptly after the Nawaz Sharif government was overthrown in a military coup by Chairman of Joint Chiefs of Staff Committee and Chief of Army Staff General Pervez Musharraf. Aziz associated with Pakistan's foreign policy after his removal and tacitly backed Pakistan's decision to conduct nuclear tests. In a thesis written by Aziz in his book, "Between Dreams and Realities: Some Milestones in Pakistan's History:

It was a big upset about what happened to the economy after the [atomic] tests, but was consoled that in 2002, India mobilized half a million troops on the border after an attack on its parliament in 2001, but was finally forced to withdraw the "due to the danger of a nuclear retaliation by Pakistan....

— Sartaj Aziz, defending Pakistan's decision to tests its nuclear capability in 1998,

=== National Security and Foreign Adviser (2013–2017) ===
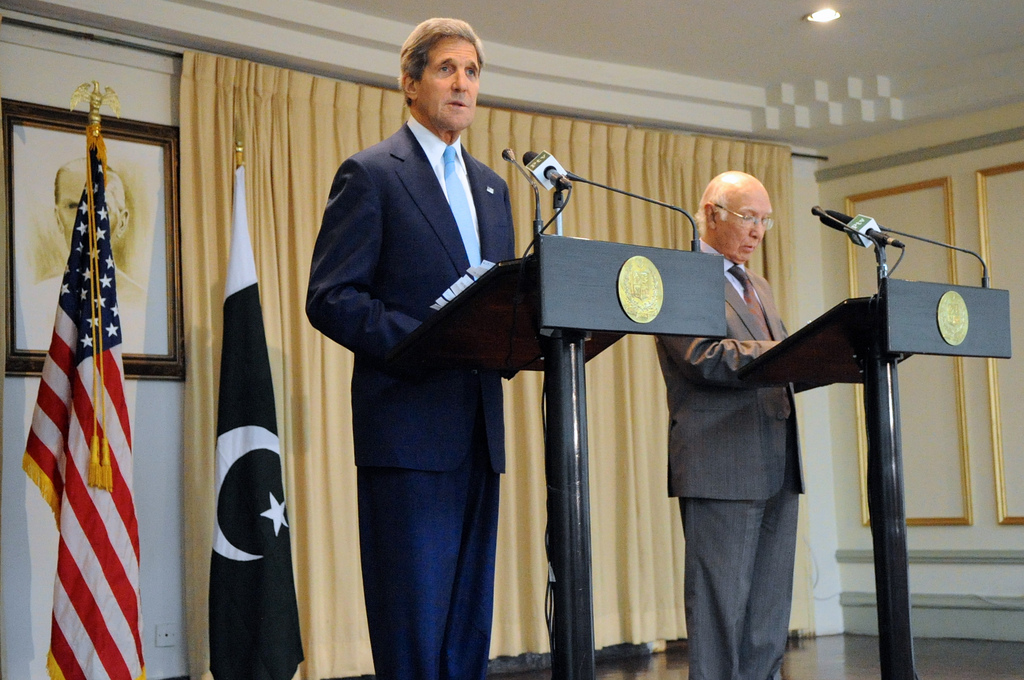
John Kerry and Aziz address reporters during a news conference in Islamabad.

In 2013, the PML(N) secured the landslide victory during the nationwide general elections, with overall ~50.1% of public mandate in the National Assembly. Prime Minister Nawaz Sharif approved the appointment of Aziz to be elevated as National Security Adviser (NSA) on 15 May 2013. Aziz drafted and had it approved the new national security strategy, and announced a new policy framework.

Appointed as National Security Adviser (NSA), Aziz held a meeting with Minister of External Affairs Salman Khurshid to discuss the situation in LoC. Aziz's three-day official visit also included meeting with Hurriyat Conference and Kashmir leaders. In early months of 2014, the PPP politicians began a protest at the Parliament over the foreign policy shift in regards to civil war in Syria. The protest took place after Saudi Crown prince Salman bin Abdulaziz visited Pakistan, and news channels widely broadcast the reports Saudi Arabia was in talks with Pakistan to provide anti-aircraft and anti-tank rockets to the rebel. Delivering a speech at the National Assembly session, Aziz strongly rejected the speculations surfaced in the news channels regarding change in Pakistan's policy on Syria and linking it with the visit of Saudi crown prince. Aziz quoted: This impression is baseless and misleading that there has been a policy shift regarding Syria. Pakistan fully honours national and international laws in its agreements and sale of arms."

On nuclear weapons policy, Aziz defended Pakistan's rationale of nuclear deterrence. Speaking at the general public in the United States Aziz explained Pakistan's nuclear arsenal policy: our (atomic) program is entirely deterrent in nature, in the sense that if India—we have to have enough parity to defend ourselves. And if we hadn't any nuclear weapons in 2002, after the parliament attack, we would have had a major war with India, and several other opportunities, so there's no question that nuclear capacity has given us some insurance, because our conventional capacity, the gap is increasing.

In a wake of deadly Peshawar massacre in December 2014, Aziz visited Kabul and held a meeting with Afghan President Ashraf Ghani where he emphasized on tighter "border control". In further talks with Afghan President Ashraf Ghani, Aziz widely quoted that "the military in Pakistan and security forces in Afghanistan have agreed to carry out coordinated operations against terrorists along the Pak-Afghan border.

In October 2015, Aziz relinquish his post as National Security Advisor to Naseer Khan Janjua (a retired army general) which was viewed as to provide coordination between civilian Foreign ministry and the military on foreign policy issues, which were being ignored due to his hectic engagement as per demand of the dual offices, quoted by the officials in Islamabad. On 9 December 2015, Aziz hosted the Heart of Asia conference in Islamabad and met with Indian Minister of External Affairs Sushma Swaraj; Aziz also accompanied Sushma Swaraj to meet with Prime Minister Sharif. About the foreign intervention in Syrian civil war, Aziz explained Pakistan's policy on Syria in Senate in December 2015 that Pakistan is "against any attempt to topple the government of Syrian President Bashar al-Assad".

=== Deputy Chairman Planning Commission (2017–2018) ===
After the dismissal of Nawaz Sharif as prime minister, Shahid Khaqan Abbasi, who succeeded Sharif, appointed Aziz as Deputy Chairman Planning Commission. Aziz was among four political appointees of the previous PML-N government. His goal during his short tenure was to improve the functionality of the commission. He continued to work in this capacity until 31 May 2018.

== Other activities ==
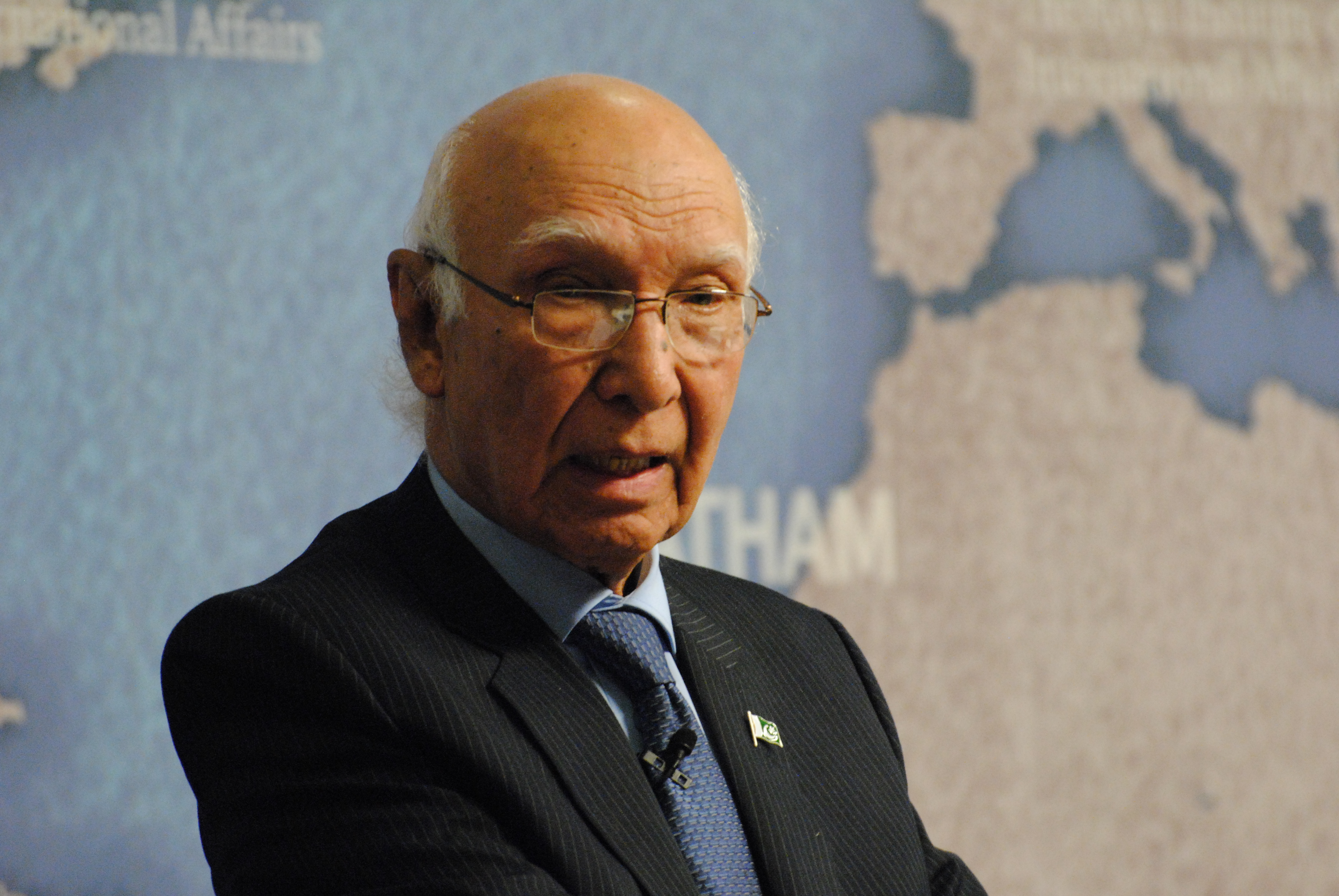
Aziz talking at the Chatham House in London

During his term as Foreign minister, Aziz made an effort with neighbouring India to promote peace and harmony between two countries. His leading peace activism efforts led India to declare Pakistan as Most favoured nation (MFN) in 1996.

Aziz authored Between dreams and realities: Some Milestones in Pakistan's history, which was published in 2009 by Oxford University Press.

Aziz was forced out by his peers during the wave of 1999 military coup d'état which started and ended the massive arrests of his colleagues and government ministers of Nawaz Sharif. In 2001, Aziz joined the Department of Social Sciences of the Beaconhouse National University in Lahore and served there as a professor of economics. In 2009, Aziz was appointed Vice-Chancellor of Beaconhouse National University.

== Death ==
Aziz died on 2 January 2024 in Islamabad, Pakistan, at the age of 94.

== Awards ==
For his participation in the Pakistan movement, Aziz is the holder of the Sanad, Mujahid-e-Pakistan. In 1959, he was awarded the Tamgha-e-Pakistan (Medal of Pakistan) and the Sitara-e-Khidmat in 1967 for his work in central planning and economic development.

== Books ==
- Aziz, Sartaj (1999). Agricultural policies for the 1990s. Paris, France: Head of Publication Service, OCD. pp. 1–134. ISBN 92-64-13350-X.
- Aziz, Sartaj (1990). Privatisation in Pakistan. Paris, France: Organization for Economic Cooperation and Development. ISBN 92-64-15310-1.
- Aziz, Sartaj (2000). Dil, Anwar Salik (ed.). Hunger, poverty and development: life and work of Sartaj Aziz. Michigan, United States: Intellectual Forum Publications, at the University of Michigan. p. 592. ISBN 978-969-0-01622-5.
- Aziz, Sartaj (2009) [2009], Between dreams and realities: some milestones in Pakistan's history (Illustrated ed.), Oxford, United Kingdom: Oxford University Press, 2009, p. 408, ISBN 978-0-19-547718-4

== See also ==
- List of foreign ministers in 2017
- List of current foreign ministers

Political offices
Preceded by Ehsan-ul-Haq Piracha; Acting	Minister of Finance; 1990–1993	Succeeded by Farooq Leghari
Preceded by Farooq Leghari	Minister of Finance; 1993	Succeeded by Syed Babar Ali
Preceded by Shahid Javed Burki; Acting	Minister of Finance; 1997–1998	Succeeded by Nawaz Sharif; Acting
Preceded by Gohar Ayub Khan	Minister of Foreign Affairs; 1998–1999	Succeeded by Abdul Sattar
Preceded by Mir Hazar Khan Khoso; Acting	Adviser on the Foreign Affairs; 2013–2017; Serving with Tariq Fatemi	Succeeded by Khawaja Muhammad Asif
Preceded by Mahmud Ali Durrani; 2008–2009	National Security Adviser; 2013–2015	Succeeded by Naseer Khan Janjua
