= Ghulam Umar =

Pakistani general and security chief

- غلام عمر

1st Chief of National security of Pakistan
- In office 25 March 1969 – 20 December 1971
- Preceded by: Position established
- Succeeded by: Akbar Khan

Personal details
- Born: 1 October 1922 Ambala, Punjab, British India
- Died: 18 January 2009 (aged 86) Karachi, Sindh, Pakistan
- Children: 6, including Zubair and Asad
- Education: Aligarh Muslim University (B.A.)

Military service
- Allegiance: British India; Pakistan
- Branch/service: British Indian Army (1942–1947); Pakistan Army (1947–1971)
- Years of service: 1942—1971
- Rank: Major General
- Unit: 15th Punjab Regiment
- Battles/wars: World War II; Burma Campaign; Indo-Pakistani war of 1965; Bangladesh Liberation War; Indo-Pakistani war of 1971

Ghulam Umar (Note: Urdu: غلام عمر) (Note: Referred to as "Omar" in some sources.) (1 October 1922 – 18 January 2009) was a Pakistani two-star rank general who served as the 1st Chief of National security from 1969 to 1971, heading the National security council of Pakistan. He was also a central member of Yahya Khan's military junta.

== Early life and education ==
Ghulam Umar was born on 1 October 1922 in Ambala, British india, to a family of Islamic scholars. His father worked in the post and telegraph department in Delhi.

He attended Aligarh Muslim University, where he graduated with a Bachelor's degree.

== Military career (1942-1971) ==
=== British Indian Army ===
Umar was emergency commissioned into the 15th Punjab Regiment of the British Indian Army as a 2nd Lieutenant on 13 September 1942 through the University Officers' Training Corps. During World War II, he saw action in the Burma campaign.

=== Pakistan Army ===
During the Partition of India, Umar opted to join the Pakistan Army.

During the 1960s, he served as the Military Secretary to King Faisal of Saudi Arabia. He also served as the Director of military operations at the General Headquarters. Between 1968 and 1969, Umar is said to have distributed money to counter the Pakistan People's Party in West Pakistan and the Awami League in East Pakistan.

After General Yahya Khan took over the presidency in 1969, Umar was appointed Chief of National Security. During the military regime of President Yahya Khan, Major General Ghulam Umar served as a key figure within the inner circle of the coterie. Following the establishment of the National Security Council (NSC) by presidential decree in 1969, Umar was appointed as its first secretary and vice chairman.

Some sources state that Umar was tasked with an intelligence operation to ensure no political party would get an overall majority in the 1970 Pakistani general election. Umar's NSC worked alongside the Inter-Services Intelligence and the Intelligence Bureau during this time. He also pushed for a military solution regarding East Pakistan. He was also present in Dhaka during the initiation of Operation Searchlight. Prior to the operation, he was assigned to oversee the ISI's activities in the east.

During the India–Pakistan war of 1971 Major General Ghulam Umar briefly assumed command of the 23rd Infantry Division Group from 10 December.

President Zulfikar Ali Bhutto announced Ghulam Umar's removal from service on 20 December 1971 following the war.

== Later life ==
Umar was arrested and subsequently imprisoned after his dismissal. He was later released from prison on 18 June 1972 and instead kept under house arrest after writing a letter of apology to the government.

The Hamoodur Rahman Commission Report recommended that Umar, alongside other officers, be publicly tried on charges of conspiring to usurp power from President Ayub Khan and rigging the 1970 Pakistani general election. The inquiry found him guilty of dissuading political candidates and funding certain political parties to manipulate the results.

He is also accused for his complicity in the Bangladesh genocide during the Bangladesh Liberation War.

Ghulam Umar died on 18 January 2009. He had 6 sons, including Muhammad Zubair Umar and Asad Umar.
