= Mahmud Ali Durrani =

Pakistani two-star rank general officer

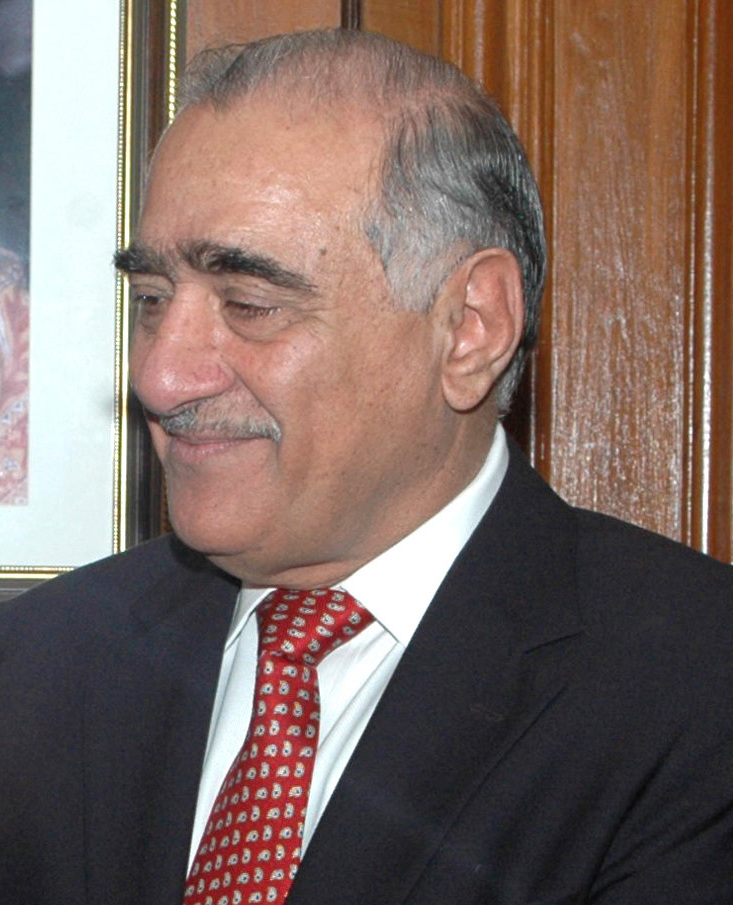
- Mahmud Ali Durrani in 2008

5th National Security Adviser
- In office 11 May 2008 – 10 January 2009
- President: Asif Zardari; Pervez Musharraf
- Prime Minister: Yousaf Raza Gillani
- Preceded by: Tariq Aziz
- Succeeded by: Sartaj Aziz (Appointment in 2013)

Pakistan Ambassador to the United States
- In office 5 June 2006 – 9 May 2008
- Preceded by: Jehangir Karamat
- Succeeded by: Husain Haqqani

Personal details
- Born: 1941 (age 84–85) Abbottabad, British India
- Died: 24 October 2025
- Citizenship: Pakistan
- Education: Army Burn Hall College; Pakistan Military Academy; National Defence University
- Awards: Hilal-e-Imtiaz (Military)
- Nickname: General Shanti

Military service
- Allegiance: Pakistan
- Branch/service: Pakistan Army
- Years of service: 1961–1998
- Rank: Major-General
- Unit: 25th Cavalry, Armoured Corps
- Commands: Mil Secy to the President; 1st Armoured Division, Multan; Pakistan Ordnance Factories; 25th Cavalry
- Battles/wars: Indo-Pakistani War of 1965; Indo-Pakistani War of 1971

Mahmud Ali Durrani (Urdu: محمود علی درانی;1941-24 October 2025) was a retired Pakistani two-star rank general officer, author of security studies, and a former National Security Advisor to the Pakistani government, serving from 2008 until his termination in 2009.

Durrani had previously served as Pakistan Ambassador to the United States.

== Early years and military career ==
Durrani was born in 1941 in Abbottabad, which is in the Khyber Pakhtunkhwa province (formerly North-West Frontier Province) of Pakistan. He is an ethnic Pashtun from the Durrani tribe. He started his schooling at Army Burn Hall College in Srinagar in 1947. After graduating from Pakistan Military Academy in 1961 in the 24th PMA Long Course (same batch as General Jehangir Karamat, who later became the Army chief) and winning the sword of honour, he served in various command, staff and instructional posts for about 16 years. From 1977 to 1982, he was Pakistani Armed Forces attaché in Washington, D.C. He then served as military secretary to the president of Pakistan until 1986.

Durrani was the posted as the commander the 1st Armoured Division in Multan, and being the former MS to the president persuaded the then Army chief and president General Muhammad Zia-ul-Haq to witness the tank exercise in Bahawalpur desert on 17 August 1988. It was on its way back to Islamabad that the C-130 carrying the presidential and higher military entourage crashed right after taking off from Bahawalpur airport, killing everyone on board.

From 1992 to 1998, Durrani was the chairman of the Pakistan Ordnance Factories Board. Mahmud He retired as a Major General of the Pakistan Army.

== Academic and diplomatic career ==
Durrani was also an advisor in the International Institute for Strategic Studies in London, which he served from 2001 to 2004. After retiring from the Pakistani Army, he was actively involved in the peace efforts between Pakistan and India. As part of a process sponsored by the United Nations, he also worked with former senior officials from the United States, Russia and Iran to find a peaceful resolution to the Afghan crisis.

Durrani was appointed as Pakistan Ambassador to the United States by President Pervez Musharraf in June 2006, replacing another General Jehangir Karamat. They both belong to the Armoured corps of Pakistan Army, with Durrani being the third Armoured Corps officer to take the helms of ambassadorship at Washington, D.C.; the first one was Lt Gen Ejaz Azim, who was ambassador during General Zia-ul-Haq and Reagan era.

Durrani was also called "General Shanti" by an Indian newspaper for his effort in trying to promote peace with India and Pakistan.

== National Security Advisor ==
Durrani was appointed National Security Advisor to Prime Minister Yousaf Raza Gillani in April 2008 at the behest of Asif Ali Zardari who, at the time, only held the post of co-chairman Pakistan Peoples Party (he became the President in September 2008). However, Durrani was fired as NSA by Gillani in January 2009 for not "taking Prime Minister into confidence" about accepting the nationality of Ajmal Kasab, the lone gunman captured in the 2008 Mumbai attacks, even though Durrani had consulted the ISI chief who had in turn consulted the President Zardari before announcing that Ajmal Kasab was a Pakistani national.

== Books ==
His book India and Pakistan: The Cost of Conflict and the Benefits of Peace and Pakistan’s Security Imperatives: Year 2000 and Beyond argued that in the process of Indo-Pakistan normalisation, based on the Balusa Group's recommendations, Pakistan should take the initiative in "re-engaging" India after the 1999 Kargil operation and subsequent negative events associated with Pakistan policies. Strikingly, the stages of engagement outlined in the book were followed closely by President Pervez Musharraf after 2001: "Preliminary Secret Contacts, Stage Two Secret Meetings, Summit, Follow-up Meetings."

He was the father of three children.

Diplomatic posts
Preceded by Jehangir Karamat	Pakistan Ambassador to the United States; 2006–2008	Succeeded by Husain Haqqani
