= Ghulam Muhammad Malik =

Pakistan Army general

Lieutenant General Ghulam Muhammad Malik
- Born: Shahpur, Pakistan
- Children: Lt General Asim Malik
- Military career
- Allegiance: Pakistan
- Branch: Pakistan Army
- Service years: 1958–1995
- Rank: Lieutenant General
- Nickname: General G. M. malik
- Unit: 12 Baloch
- Commands: 12th Infantry Division; DG Military Intelligence (DGMI); Pakistan Military Academy; X Corps; Adjutant General.
- Conflicts: Indo-Pakistan War of 1965; Indo-Pakistan War of 1971

Ghulam Muhammad Malik (also called G.M. Malik) is a Pakistani former military officer who commanded the 10 Corps, Rawalpindi of the Pakistan Army. 10 Corps was responsible for defending the entire Line of Control between Pakistan administered Kashmir and the Indian-administered Kashmir. He retired from the army in 1995, and has since headed a charity to build hospitals and medical facilities for the poor in various parts of Pakistan. His son Asim Malik is also serving in Pak Army.

== Early life and education ==
Malik belongs to the Awan tribe. He is from Sargodha. Malik is a graduate of PAF Public School Sargodha where he was from 1st Entry (1953–1957).

== Career ==
Mailk began his military career as a cadet in PMA and was selected to be sent to Royal Military Academy Sandhurst where he was declared the best cadet and won the "Queen's Gold Medal".

He joined Pakistan Army in the late 1950s, and became a lieutenant general. He served as commandant of the Pakistan Military Academy from 1987 to 1989. In the 1990s, he was given command of the X Corps.

== Retirement ==
Malik retired in April 1995 and was succeeded by then DG Military Intelligence (DGMI) Lt. General Ali Kuli Khan Khattak.
