= Pakistan–Syria relations =

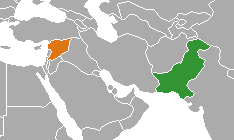
- Pakistan: Syria

Pakistan–Syria relations are the historic, international, and bilateral relations between Syria and Pakistan. Syria has an embassy in Islamabad. Pakistan is represented in Syria through its embassy in Damascus and honorary consulate in Homs. Through the ancient civilization exchange, areas of modern Pakistan were part of the silk route with Syria. From 711 AD onwards, Syrian Islamic missionaries introduced Islam in areas of modern Pakistan.

Pakistan's position on the Syrian Civil War was complicated as it meant balancing both Iran, that supported Bashar al-Assad's erstwhile regime, and Saudi Arabia and Turkey, that supported the Syrian Opposition. Pakistan attempted to maintain bilateral relations with all three countries at the same time and stayed out of disputes between them. In 2012, under the Pakistan People's Party-led government, representatives from Pakistan along with Afghanistan, Algeria, Armenia, Belarus, Benin, China, Cuba, Ecuador, Georgia, India, Indonesia, Iraq, Jordan, Kazakhstan, Kyrgyzstan, Mauritania, Nicaragua, Oman, Palestine, Russia, Sri Lanka, Sudan, Tajikistan, Tunisia, Turkmenistan, Venezuela, and Zimbabwe, declared their opposition to any intervention in Syria in an international consultative meeting that was hosted by Iran. However, in 2014, Pakistan (under the government led by the Pakistan Muslim League (N)) declared its support for the formation of a transitional governing body. Around this time, Foreign Policy was reporting that Saudi Arabia had enlisted the help of Pakistani instructors to train Syrian rebel forces, something that was mentioned in the pro-Bashar al-Assad newspaper of the Syrian Communist Party (Unified) al-Nour. Pakistan officially denied any plans to send support to the Syrian opposition. In 2015, Pakistan declared its opposition to any foreign military intervention in Syria and voiced its support for Syria's sovereignty. Then foreign secretary Aizaz Ahmad Chaudhry stated that "Pakistan supports all efforts employed at facilitating a peaceful Syrian-led and inclusive solution that meets the aspirations of the Syrian people through a comprehensive political dialogue." Pakistan, during the tenure of Prime Minister Imran Khan, expressed its support and solidarity with Turkey in its "war against terrorism" when Turkey was conducting a military operation against the Baathist regime forces in 2020. The then Prime Minister of Pakistan, Imran Khan, made a phone call to Turkish President Recep Tayyip Erdoğan and offered his condolences over the deaths of Turkish soldiers in Idlib due to airstrikes that were carried out by the Russian Air Force and the Syrian Air Force (which was under the command of the Assad regime at the time). It is worth noting, however, that Pakistan did not close its embassy in Damascus, even throughout the harshest stages of the fight against Bashar al-Assad's regime. Furthermore, Pakistan's relations with Bashar al-Assad's regime improved in the period following the regime's victory in the Battle of Aleppo (2012–2016), following which it was thought that the regime had won the conflict. This coincided with a general loss in international legitimacy that the Syrian opposition once enjoyed in the international community. Pakistan has cracked down on the pro-Bashar al-Assad militia consisting of mainly Shia Pakistani fighters with the name of Liwa Zainebiyoun, going so far as to ban it. Pakistan recognized the new Syrian government following Syria's liberation from Bashar al-Assad's regime and in 2025 it demanded the lifting of sanctions on the country.

== History of relations ==
=== Ancient History ===
Umayyad Caliphate (greatest extent)

The regions comprising modern Syria and Pakistan have been under the rule of contiguous empires at various points in history, including during the reign of the Persian Empire, the conquests of Alexander the Great, Seleucid Empire and Sassanid Persia. However, the most influential impact was made during the duration of the Umayyad Caliphate, which stretched from Spain to India at its height and was centered at Damascus. The Indian provinces of the Caliphate corresponded to modern Sindh, Balochistan and southern Punjab, and during their administration, Indian (as well as Greek, Persian and Egyptian) craftsmen were conscripted to help construct the Great Mosque of Damascus.

=== 1960s–70s: Political relations ===
Syria and Pakistan established diplomatic relations in 1948. The foreign relations began to grow during the 1960s when Pakistan Armed Forces contingent were dispatched to Syria, specifically the fighter pilots to fly Syrian Air Force's Mig fighter jets.

In the 1970s, Syrian President Hafez al-Assad came to Pakistan to participate in the international Organization of Islamic Conference, being the first Syrian President to have been visited Pakistan. Assad was believed to be a close ally of former Prime Minister Zulfikar Ali Bhutto. In a view of former statesman, Khurshid Kasuri, Pakistan's silence is a product of "historical links between the Bhutto and al-Assad families." After the death of Zulfikar Ali Bhutto, Syrian President Hafez al-Assad ultimately awarded asylum to Benazir, Murtaza and Shahnavaz Bhutto in 1979 to support for their leftist campaign against President General Zia-ul-Haq.

==== Pakistan and the Yom Kippur War ====
In the events leading to the Yom Kippur War against Israel in 1973 which is usually referred to as the Ramadan War in Pakistan, a strong Pakistan military contingent was dispatched by Prime Minister Zulfikar Bhutto to Syrian Armed Forces to help and to provide necessary military combat training, requested by Syrian President Hafez al-Assad. From 1973 to 1977, the Pakistan military advisers trained the Syrian Army personnel in various military tactics while maintaining a strong combat division to provide protection of Damascus from any possible Israeli Army attacks during the course of the war. The Pakistan Navy also played an active role in providing the naval hardware to Syrian navy while the PAF dispatched a sizable unit of its fighter pilots to fly the Syrian Air Force fighter jets, operating from Inchass field of Egyptian Air Force. The PAF wing led by Wing Commander Masood Hatif, the PAF and navy fighter pilots flew several of Syrian Air Forces' MiG 21 fighter jets and reportedly made aggressive patrols over Syrian-Israeli border.

According to modern Pakistani sources, in 1974, one of the PAF's notable fighter pilot Flight-Lieutenant Sattar Alvi who flew Syrian Air Force's MiG-21, shot down IAF's Mirage-IIIC fighter jet which was piloted by Captain M. Lutz, who later succumbed to wounds he sustained during ejection. However, no major sources from the time reported on such an incident, and there is no mention of "Captain Lutz" in Israel's Ministry of Defense's record of Israel's casualties of war. After the battle, Flight Lieutenant Alvi and Squadron Leader Arif Manzoor were awarded two of Syria's highest decorations for gallantry awards in 1973 by President Hafez al-Assad in a public ceremony.

=== 1970s–80s: Cooling and normalizing of relations ===
After the removal of Bhutto, Pakistan's relations with Syria had nose-dived after President Zia-ul-Haq assumed the control of the country in 1978. In 1981, the relations deteriorated when the PIA commercial flight, Boeing 720, was hijacked by the operatives of al-Zulfikar in Damascus. The Pakistan government had long assessed that the al-Zulfikar had the enjoyed the support from the President Hafez al-Assad.

Tensions increased when Syria treated the hijackers as state guests, and the Foreign ministry delegation led by Major-General Rahim Khan was ill-treated. The relations tensed until the next five years when the Foreign ministry successful negotiations normalized relations with Syria. In 1987, President Zia-ul-Haq made a surprise state visit to Damascus and had a one-to-one meeting with President Hafez al-Assad to lead the discussion to normalize the relations. Concerning about the political instability in Pakistan and suppression of left-wing alliance led by Benazir Bhutto, President al-Assad declared in audience: "Had Pakistan adopted Arabic, the language of the Quran, as the national language, the lingual rifts and political divisions and anarchy would not have occurred. Pakistan would have remained a united country."

After President Zia-ul-Haq's death and Benazir Bhutto becoming the Prime minister, the relations were warmed once again as Prime minister Benazir Bhutto promoted strong left-wing ideas and relations with Moscow.

=== 1980s–2000s: Commerce, trade and education ===
In the 1990s, Syria successfully sought help from Pakistan to establish its own tractor factory in the country. Since the 1990s, Pakistan helped upgrade Syria's sugar, cement, fertilizer, and paper industry as well as cooperation has been increased in agriculture process.

Under a Pakistan Technical Assistance Programme (PTAP), Pakistan awards semester scholarships to Syrian students to study agriculture science at the University of Faisalabad; Pakistan also invested in establishing the institutes for computer science and informatics in Damascus in late 1990s. Since Benazir Bhutto and Pakistan Peoples Party (PPP) coming to power in 1993, the relations were warmed when Syria supported Pakistan's case for Kashmir and refers to the illegal Indian occupation of Eastern Kashmir as "an open aggression." However, Syria recognizes that Kashmir is a bilateral issue between India and Pakistan. After long negotiations, Pakistan and Syria have agreed for mutual cooperation and exchange of experts in the field of science and technology which led to the establishment of Pak-Syria Joint Committee on Science and Technology in 2005.

Moral and diplomatic support of Pakistan continued for Syria's position on Golan Heights in the UN after the Six-Day War. On annual basis, Pakistan exports a large cache of wheat and cotton to Syria on minimum prices in return for Syria providing crude oil to Pakistan at a lesser rates.

=== 2010–present ===
In 2010, President Asif Zardari paid a state visit to Syria to meet with President Bashar al-Assad to expedite exchange of delegations in both government and private levels in political and economic sectors, eventually signing a trade treaty in 2010.

Ultimately after the start of the Syrian civil war, Pakistan adopted a policy of neutrality and pushed its non-belligerent role during the conflict. Official stand of Pakistan keenly oppose the strong use of military strikes against Syria. At the meeting of the UNSC, Pakistan abstained from vote on an anti-Syria resolution in the UN General Assembly. Conference held by Iran, Pakistan urged the international community to respect Syria's sovereignty, independence and territorial integrity.

Pakistan has strongly urged the United States and western powers to avoid use of military force in Syria. In a statement, the Foreign Office spokesperson Aizaz Chaudhry maintained that Syria's sovereignty and territorial integrity must be respected. Pakistan has greatly expressed deep concerns over the ongoing violence and threat of possible American military action looming large over already embattled Syria. The Pakistan Foreign ministry also strongly condemned the alleged use of chemical weapons of Syrian government, "All the engaged parties should adopt course of dialogue instead of violence and peaceful resolution of the conflict should be sought out", the Foreign Office quoted. The National Security Adviser, Sartaj Aziz, has quoted at the United Nations that: "Pakistan condemns the use of chemical weapons, but it does not support aerial strikes which the U.S. proposes as it will only make the situation "more concerning". Aziz strongly exhorted to the U.S and UK, "We should wait for the UN mission’s report on Syria."

According to Deutsche Welle, experts were claiming that Pakistan was not only providing military equipment to anti-Assad groups, but was also helping jihadists to go fight in Syria. However, Pakistan has officially denied any claims of involvement. On 17 February 2014, Islamabad stated its support for "the formation of a transitional governing body with full executive powers enabling it to take charge of the affairs of the country". The statement, which was made in the wake of a Saudi delegation's visit to Pakistan, was thought to suggest a policy shift although a Pakistani government official stated that there was no change in Pakistan's principle policy on Syria.

In December 2015, Pakistan foreign affairs stated that it was against any foreign military intervention in the Syrian Civil War and voiced its support for Syria's sovereignty. By 2018, the Pakistan International School of Damascus, which is under the auspices of the Pakistani Embassy, has become a leading school in the country.

In December 2018, Lieutenant General Faiz Hameed, then Director General of the CT Wing of ISI, visited Syria and met with top officials to discuss increasing cooperation. Training Syrian officers and restricting the return of Pakistani fighters from Syria topped the agenda.

Pakistan voiced its solidarity for Turkey during their military action in Syria in 2019 and 2020.

In October 2021, Syrian and Pakistani commercial airlines began to operate flights between the countries. This came around a time when it was perceived that Bashar al-Assad had won the Syrian Civil War, and hence Pakistan joined other Sunni-majority countries in normalizing with the regime. In 2022, Shahid Akhtar was appointed as Ambassador Extraordinary and Plenipotentiary of Pakistan to Syria.

According to a 2023 reporting by Middle East Eye, since the outbreak of the Syrian Civil War, Pakistan’s influence in Syria has grown quietly but noticeably, particularly in diplomatic, educational, and bilateral ties. Islamabad maintained a policy of engagement even as many states distanced themselves during Syria’s isolation following the conflict, continuing to support the Pakistan International School in Damascus and providing assistance during crises such as the 2020 wildfires and the 2023 earthquake. The Pakistan International School in Damascus gained prominence during the Syrian civil war by remaining open when many foreign-run schools closed, which increased its appeal among wealthy and well-connected Syrian families. The school attracted members of Syria’s elite by offering English-medium instruction, internationally oriented curricula, and credentials that facilitate access to universities abroad, features that were scarce in the conflict-affected education sector. Pakistani diplomats cultivated relationships with Syrian officials, and Islamabad’s refusal to endorse efforts to oust the Bashar al-Assad government in 2015 reinforced its stance.

== See also ==
- Foreign relations of Pakistan
- Foreign relations of Syria
