= Nasir Khan Janjua =

Pakistani general

Lieutenant General Nasir Khan Janjua HI(M)
- محمد ناصر خان جنجوعہ
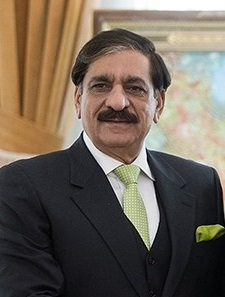
- Janjua in 2018

7th National Security Advisor of Pakistan
- In office 23 October 2015 – 27 June 2018
- Prime Minister: Nawaz Sharif; Shahid Khaqan Abbasi; Nasirul Mulk (caretaker)
- Preceded by: Sartaj Aziz
- Succeeded by: Moeed Yusuf

Corps Commander Quetta
- In office 19 August 2013 – 3 October 2015

President National Defence University
- In office July 2012 – 18 August 2013

Vice Chief of General Staff — Bravo
- In office July 2010 – July 2012

GOC 17th Infantry Division (Kharian) 1 Corps
- In office December 2008 – July 2010

GOC 17th Infantry Division (Swat District)
- In office November 2007 – December 2008

Director General Military Operations
- In office September 2007 – October 2007

Director Military Operations
- In office 2006 – September 2007

Personal details
- Born: Mohammad Nasir Khan Janjua Rawalpindi, Punjab, Pakistan
- Education: Forman Christian College; Pakistan Military Academy; Pakistan Command and Staff College; National Defence University

Military service
- Allegiance: Pakistan
- Branch/service: Pakistan Army
- Years of service: 1977–2015
- Rank: LTG
- Unit: 32 Punjab Regiment
- Commands: XII Corps; VCGS — Bravo; 17th Infantry Division
- Battles/wars: Siachen conflict United Nations Transitional Authority in Cambodia: Insurgency in Khyber Pakhtunkhwa; Operation Rah-e-Haq; Balochistan conflict
- Awards: Hilal-e-Imtiaz (M)

Nasir Khan Janjua HI(M) (Urdu: ناصر خان جنجوعہ) is a former three-star general of the Pakistan Army who, prior to retiring, served as Corps Commander Quetta. He served as the 7th National Security Advisor of Pakistan from 23 October 2015 until his resignation on 27 June 2018.

Janjua's notable achievements include streamlining the National Security and War Course into a single cohesive program, eliminating the unnecessary overlap. Additionally, he spearheaded the development of Azm-e-Nau, a meticulously designed military preparedness exercise with a specific emphasis on India, while serving as President of the National Defence University in Islamabad.

Prior to becoming the 7th National Security Advisor, Janjua's name was mentioned as a possible replacement for Sartaj Aziz in Pakistani news media after his meeting with Nawaz Sharif. Janjua was appointed as NSA after the NSA staff moved to the Prime Minister's Secretariat on 23 October 2015.

== Early life and education ==
Janjua completed his matriculation from the Forman Christian College.

== Military career ==
He was selected into the Pakistan Military Academy and graduated as part of the 59th course on 29 March 1979. He was commissioned into the Punjab Regiment. Later, he studied political science at the National Defence University, Pakistan.

=== Siachen conflict ===
He participated in the Siachen conflict against the Indian Army. As a Brigadier in 2005, he commanded the Siachen Brigade in Siachen.

=== Director Military Operations ===
In 2005, he became Director of Military Operations under DG Military Operations Ahmad Shuja Pasha. He also took part in military negotiations with Indian Army on 23 May 2006 to avoid clashes at the LoC.

Janjua coordinated relief operations in Azad Kashmir in the aftermath of the massive earthquake in Pakistan in 2005.

=== Director General Military Operations ===
In September 2007, he was promoted as Major General and became DG of Military Operations, the appointment was short-lived as he served until October 2007.

=== GOC 17th Division ===
He was posted as GOC of the 17th Infantry Division. From November 2007 to December 2008, Janjua took part in combat operations in Swat and oversaw Operation Rah-e-Haq. After Operation Rah-e-Haq, Janjua's division was reverted to I Strike Corps which was posted at the Indo-Pakistani border. Forces under his command were put on alert to deter possible hostile actions by the Indian Army in the aftermath of the Mumbai attacks in 2008.

=== Vice CGS (B) ===
In 2010, Janjua was appointed as the Vice Chief of General Staff - Bravo at the GHQ in Rawalpindi. In 2011, Janjua was promoted to Lieutenant General.

=== President of NDU ===
In July 2012, Janjua was appointed as the president of the National Defence University where he also served on the teaching faculty and instructed courses on war studies and political science. His appointment was later commented on by military analyst, Ikram Sehgal, as instrumental "in changing the curriculum and the 'Lal Kurti' mindset to reflect modernity in warfare, combining the National Security and War Course into one course instead of two overlapping ones."

=== Corps Commander Quetta ===
On 19 August 2013, Janjua was posted as commander of the XII Corps in Quetta with immediate effect. Janjua worked closely with CM Balochistan Abdul Malik Baloch in stabilising Balochistan and supervised firsthand counter-insurgency and counter-terrorism operations against a variety of militant groups in the restive Balochistan province. From sectarian militias to alleged Indian-sponsored separatist groups, Janjua had been a witness to some of the most vicious interference in Pakistan.

=== Retirement ===
On 29 September 2015, Janjua said that the restoration of peace in Balochistan was a joint civil-military leadership effort and urged the youth of Balochistan to lay down arms and embark on the path of peace for a peaceful Balochistan. The farewell dinner was attended by Governor of Balochistan Muhammad Khan Achakzai, CM Balochistan Abdul Malik Baloch, Chief Secretary Balochistan Saifullah Chattah, tribal elders, and other politicians and military personnel.

Janjua received honorary discharge and retired from the military on 3 October 2015 and handed over the command of XII Corps to LTG Aamir Riaz at a ceremony at the Command Headquarters.

== National Security Advisor ==
His new assignment at the National Security Council was first revealed by Najam Sethi, on his TV show Aapas ki Baat on Geo News. Since then, Pakistani media began circulating the news of Janjua being appointed as NSA.

Janjua's appointment as NSA was viewed to concentrate on foreign policy while coordinating with Sartaj Aziz which were being ignored due to his hectic engagement as per the demand of the dual offices, quoted by the officials in Islamabad. Furthermore, it was also noted that Janjua's appointment as NSA would take off the burden from Interior Minister Nisar Ali Khan's shoulders who had long been holding counter-terrorism talks with British government. The National Security Council staff that functioned under Sartaj Aziz was located at the Foreign Office, and the NSC staff was posted back to Prime Minister's Secretariat on immediate effect after Janjua's appointment.

=== Secret visit to Bangkok ===
On 6 December 2015, Janjua travelled to Bangkok, his first visit in his role as NSA, to hold secret national-security-level talks with India. The meeting was held with Indian counterpart Ajit Doval that discussed terrorism, conflict resolution involving Jammu and Kashmir, and other bilateral issues and agreed to take forward the "constructive" engagement.

=== Meeting with US Ambassador ===
In October 2017, Janjua suggested to the US Ambassador to Pakistan David Hale, setting up an empowered “US Political Authority” can lead to a political solution for the unending War in Afghanistan (2001–2021).

=== Retirement ===
He resigned on June 27, 2018.

== Effective dates of promotion ==
Insignia	Rank	Date
	Lieutenant General	October 2011
	Major General	September 2007
	Brigadier	
	Colonel	
	Lieutenant Colonel	
	Major	
	Captain	
	Lieutenant	
	Second Lieutenant	March 1979

== Awards and decorations ==

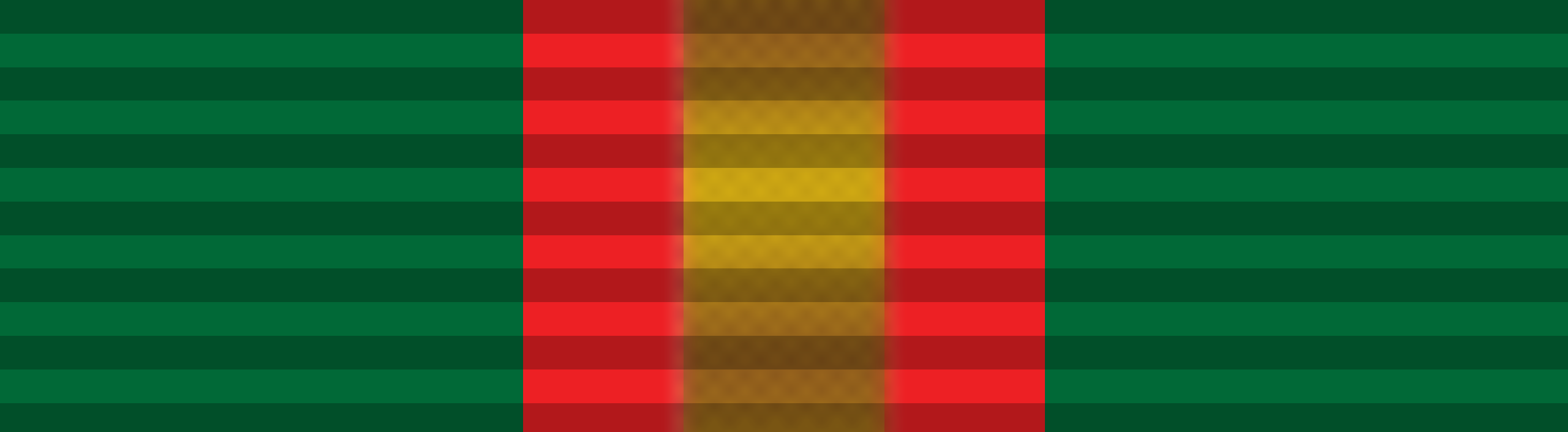

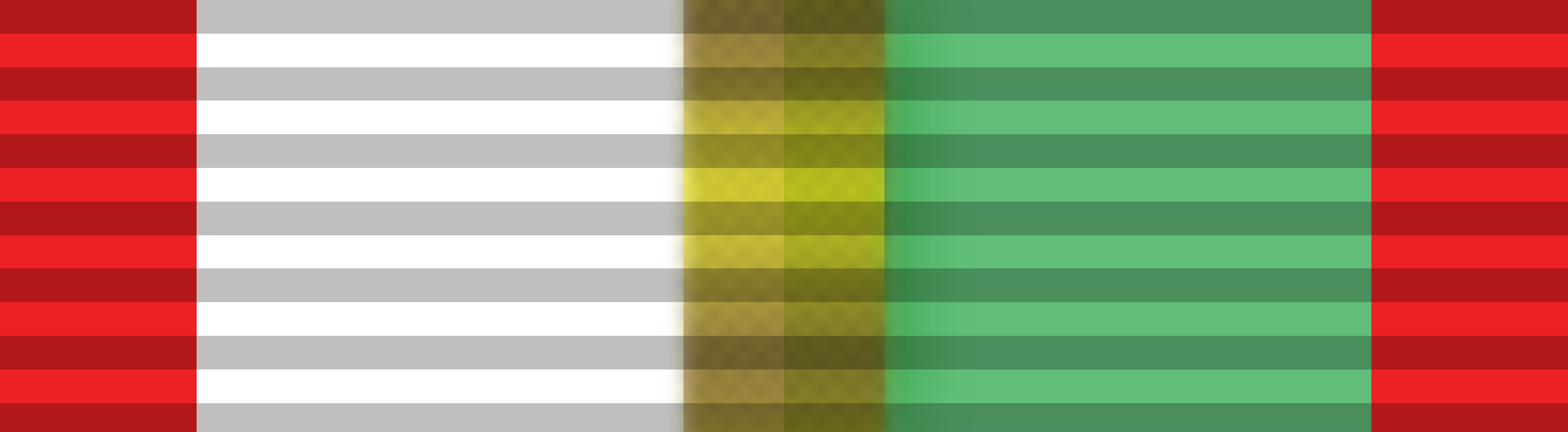

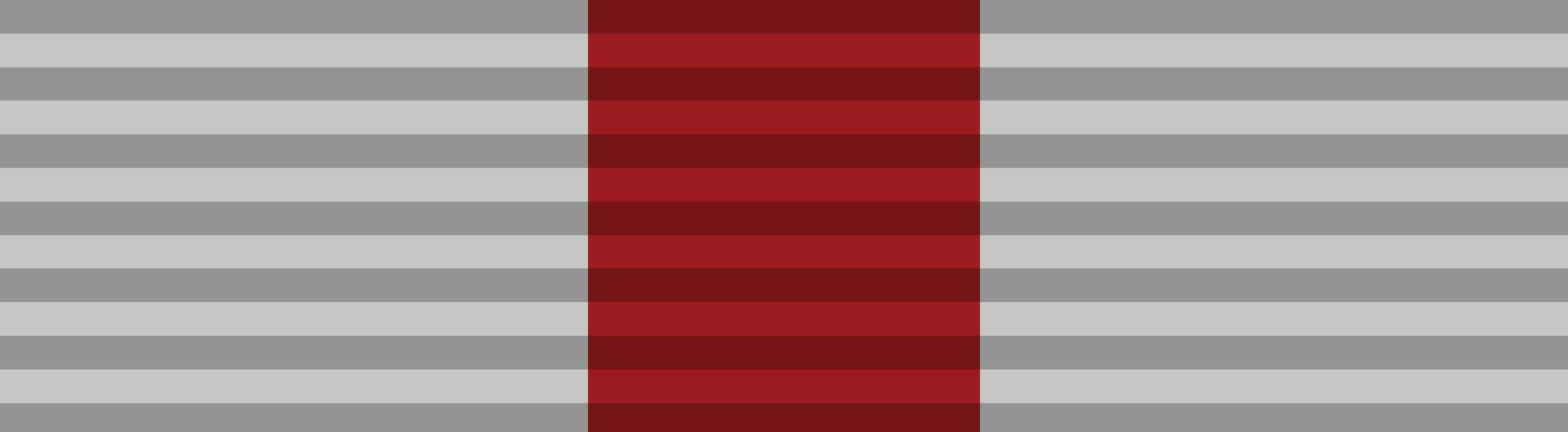

Hilal-e-Imtiaz (Military) (Crescent of Excellence) (2015)	Tamgha-e-Sad Saala Jashan-e- Wiladat-e-Quaid-e-Azam (100th Birth Anniversary of Muhammad Ali Jinnah) 1976		Hijri Tamgha (Hijri Medal) 1979
Tamgha-e-Diffa (General Service Medal) Siachen Glacier Clasp	Jamhuriat Tamgha (Democracy Medal) 1988	Qarardad-e-Pakistan Tamgha (Resolution Day) (Golden Jubilee Medal) 1990	Tamgha-e-Salgirah Pakistan (Independence Day Golden Jubilee Medal) 1997
Tamgha-e-Baqa (Nuclear Test Medal) 1998	Tamgha-e-Istaqlal Pakistan (Escalation with India Medal) 2002	10 Years Service Medal	20 Years Service Medal
30 Years Service Medal	35 Years Service Medal	United Nations UNTAC Medal (2 Deployments)	Command & Staff College Quetta Students' Medal

=== Foreign decorations ===
Foreign Awards
United Nations	UNTAC Medal (two deployments)
