= Asim Malik =

31st Director-General of Inter-Services Intelligence (Pakistan)

Asim Malik HI(M) SBt
- عاصم ملک

10th National Security Advisor of Pakistan
- Incumbent
- Assumed office 30 April 2025
- President: Asif Ali Zardari
- Prime Minister: Shehbaz Sharif
- Preceded by: Moeed Yusuf

31st Director-General of Inter-Services Intelligence
- Incumbent
- Assumed office 30 September 2024
- President: Asif Ali Zardari
- Prime Minister: Shehbaz Sharif
- Preceded by: Lt. General Nadeem Anjum

Adjutant General GHQ (Pakistan)
- In office 6 October 2021 – 29 September 2024
- Preceded by: Lt.Gen Muhammed Amir
- Succeeded by: Lt.Gen Azhar Waqas

Personal details
- Born: Shahpur Tehsil, Sargodha District, Punjab, Pakistan
- Parent: Ghulam Muhammad Malik
- Education: University of Balochistan; Fort Leavenworth; Royal College of Defence Studies; National Defence University; Pakistan Military Academy

Military service
- Allegiance: Pakistan
- Branch/service: Pakistan Army
- Service years: 1989–present
- Rank: Lieutenant General
- Unit: 12 Baloch Regiment
- Commands: Director-General of Inter-Services Intelligence; Adjutant general − GHQ; 41 Infantry Division; National Defence University (Chief instructor); VCGS − A
- Conflicts / operations: War on terror; War in Afghanistan; Insurgency in Balochistan; War in North-West Pakistan; Operation Rah-e-Nijat; Operation Zarb-e-Azb; Operation Radd-ul-Fasaad; Operation Azm-e-Istehkam; Durand line skirmishes; 2025 India–Pakistan standoff; Operation Bunyan-un-Marsoos; 2025 Afghanistan–Pakistan conflict; 2026 Afghanistan–Pakistan war
- Awards: Hilal-i-Imtiaz (Military); Sitara-e-Basalat; Sword of Honour (Pakistan)

Muhammad Asim Malik, HI(M) is a Pakistani three-star general and the current Director-General of Inter-Service Intelligence (ISI), a position he has held since 30 September 2024. He is the first PhD holder to be appointed Director-General of the ISI. He is also first ISI chief to be appointed as the 10th National Security Adviser to the Prime Minister of Pakistan since 30 April 2025. Asim Malik was granted extension as DG-ISI in October 2025. Pakistani government did not disclose duration of his extended tenure.

== Early life and education ==
Malik was born to Lt. Gen. (R.) Ghulam Muhammad Malik into a Punjabi Awan family with their ancestral roots in Shahpur, a city located in the Sargodha District of the Punjab province.

Malik earned his BSc (Hons) from the University of Balochistan in 1999 and then studied at Fort Leavenworth in the United States, where he has written thesis on mountain warfare titled as the Mountain Warfare: The Need for Specialist Training. Malik also attended the Royal College of Defence Studies in the United Kingdom. Additionally, Malik obtained the Doctor of Philosophy (Ph.D) on the US-Pakistan relations from the National Defence University. He was a graduate of the Pakistan Military Academy's 80th Long Course and was the recipient of the Sword of Honour during his course.

== Military career ==
=== Command, staff and instructional assignments ===
Malik was commissioned in the 12th Baloch Regiment in 1989, winning sword of honour of 80th PMA Long Course.

Malik served as the Chief Instructor at the National Defence University in Islamabad and as an instructor at the Pakistan Command and Staff College in Quetta.

Throughout his military career, he has been part of the Baloch Regiment. As a major general, he led the 41st Infantry Division in Balochistan and commanded an Infantry Brigade in Waziristan. He has also worked in the Military Operations Directorate as a Brigadier (Director-Military Operations).

=== Elevation to Adjutant-General (AG) ===
In October 2021, during his tenure as a Major General, Malik was elevated to the rank of Lieutenant General and was appointed to the position of Adjutant General (AG) at GHQ, Rawalpindi by then Chief of Army Staff (COAS) Qamar Javed Bajwa.

In his role as AG of the Pakistan Army, Lt. Gen. Malik handled the investigation into the May 9 riots and was believed to have initiated and overseen the court martial proceedings of former Director-General of Inter-Services Intelligence, Lt. Gen. Faiz Hameed, who faced military trial on charges of corruption and breaches of military discipline following his retirement.

=== Appointment as Director-General Inter-Services-Intelligence (DG-ISI) ===
On 23 September 2024, Malik was appointed to succeed Nadeem Anjum as the Director-General of Inter-Services Intelligence (DG ISI), with his term beginning on 30 September 2024. The announcement was made by the Pakistan Television Corporation, a departure from previous practice, where such appointments were typically announced by the Prime Minister's Office or Inter-Services Public Relations. Although Malik has limited experience in intelligence-specific roles, his appointment comes at a time of political instability, rising militancy, and heightened public attention on the ISI.

Sources within military circles indicated that Malik shares a strong connection with COAS Asim Munir, who views him as a trusted confidant. Both are the recipients of the prestigious Sword of Honour when they graduated from their respective cadet courses before induction as junior officers of the Pakistan Army.

== National Security Advisor ==
On 30 April 2025, Asim Malik appointed as Pakistans's tenth National Security Advisor (NSA), A notification issued by the Cabinet Division said that Malik would retain his role as Director-General of Inter-Service Intelligence (ISI), a position he has held since September 2024. Asim Malik shall hold the additional charge of the National Security Adviser, with immediate effect,” the notification stated. The position had remained vacant for two years following the departure of Dr. Moeed Yusuf in April 2022, when the Khan Ministry was removed from the power. During 2025 India–Pakistan standoff, the Shehbaz Ministry appointed the serving ISI Chief Malik as the NSA, marking the first time a serving Inter-Services Intelligence director general will simultaneously hold both positions.

Following the conflict, he was awarded the Sitara-e-Basalat for his role in the conflict.

== Publications ==
- Mountain Warfare: The Need for Specialist Training, 2003.

== Awards and decorations ==

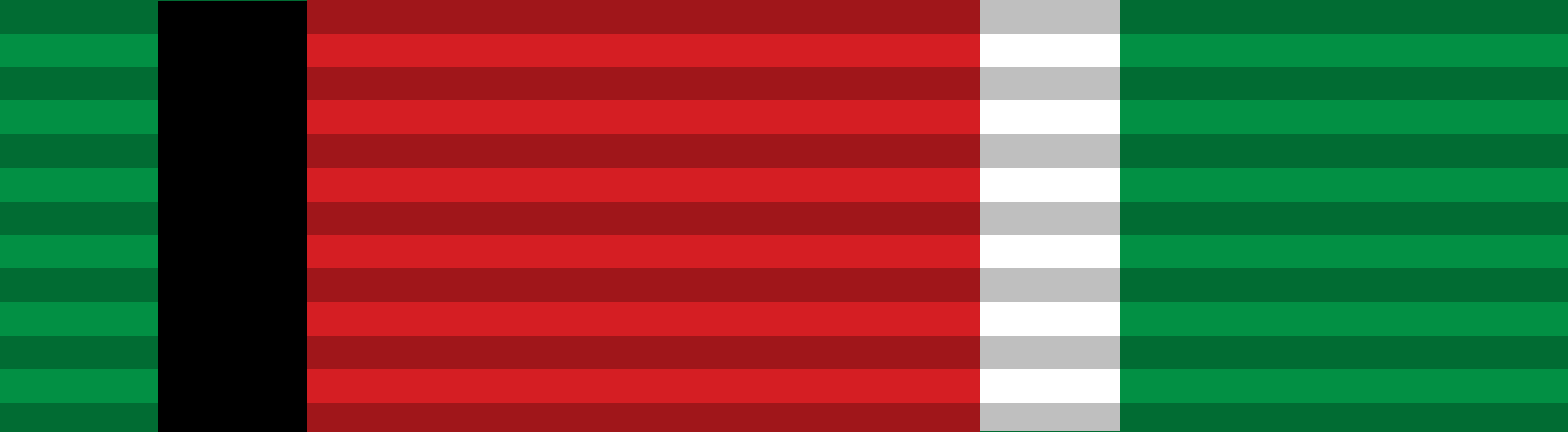

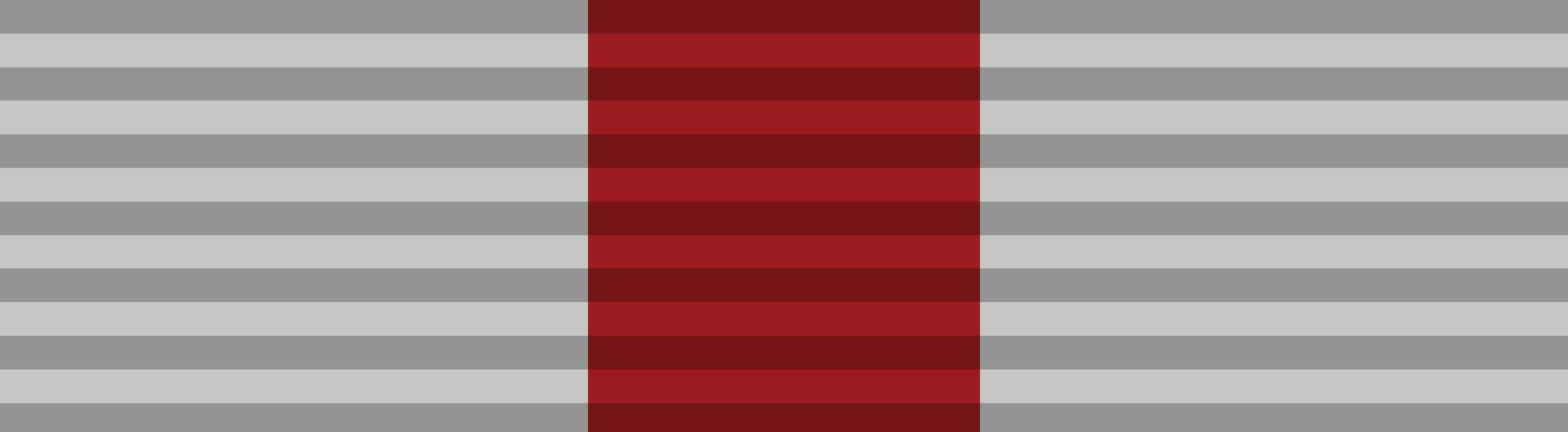

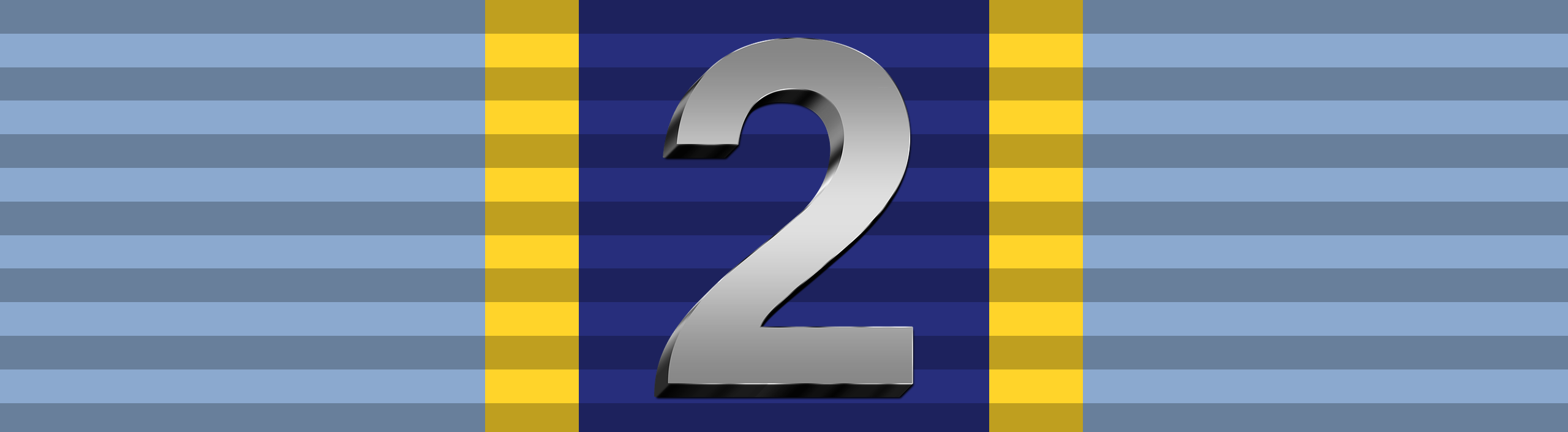

Hilal-e-Imtiaz (Military) (Crescent of Excellence)		Sitara-e-Basalat	
Tamgha-e-Diffa (General Service Medal)	Tamgha-e-Baqa (Nuclear Test Medal) 1998	Tamgha-e-Istaqlal Pakistan (Escalation with India Medal) 2002	Tamgha-e-Azm (Medal of Conviction) (2018)
10 Years Service Medal	20 Years Service Medal	30 Years Service Medal	Jamhuriat Tamgha (Democracy Medal) 1988
Qarardad-e-Pakistan Tamgha (Resolution Day Golden Jubilee Medal) 1990	Tamgha-e-Salgirah Pakistan (Independence Day Golden Jubilee Medal) 1997	Command and Staff College Quetta Centenary Student's Medal 2005	United Nations MONUSCO (2 Deployments)

== Effective dates of promotion ==
Insignia	Rank	Date
	Lieutenant General	October 2021
	Major General	February 2017
	Brigadier	
	Colonel	
	Lieutenant Colonel	
	Major	
	Captain	
	Lieutenant	
	Second Lieutenant	April 1989

Military offices
Preceded by Lt. Gen. Nadeem Anjum	Director General of the Inter-Services Intelligence	Succeeded by TBD
