= Sajid Ali =

Sajid Ali may refer to:

== People ==
- Sajid Ali (composer) (born 1977), Indian composer in the Bollywood music-directing duo Sajid–Wajid
- Sajid Ali (Lahore cricketer) (born 1979), Pakistani cricketer
- Sajid Ali (Sindh cricketer) (born 1963), Pakistani cricketer
- Sajid Ali Banbhan, Pakistani politician

== Other ==
- Sajjad Ali
