= Beaconhouse National University =

Non profit university in Lahore, Pakistan

- Seal of BNU
- Other name: BNU
- Type: Private
- Established: 2003
- Accreditation: HEC
- Affiliations: ACU; SARC
- Vice-Chancellor: Moeed Yusuf
- Location: Beacon House Society, Lahore, 53700, Pakistan; 31.3654°N 74.2169°E
- Campus: Urban
- Newspaper: The BNU Gazette
- Website: bnu.edu.pk

Beaconhouse National University (BNU) is a private, not-for-profit liberal arts university located in Lahore, in the province of Punjab, Pakistan.It was founded in 2003 by Beaconhouse School System and received its charter from the Government of Punjab in 2005. The university is recognized by Higher Education Commission of Pakistan (HEC) and is a member of Association of Commonwealth Universities.

== History ==
BNU was established in 2003 by its parent company Beaconhouse School System, one of Pakistan's largest private school networks. Its establishment was assisted by a US$6 million contribution from Beaconhouse. It was chartered by the Government of Punjab in 2005.

== Campus ==
The main campus, known as the Tarogil Campus, is located at 13 km Raiwind Road, near Jati Umrah Road, Lahore. It is located at Raiwind, a subdivision of Lahore District; the BNU campus is adjacent to the Bahria Town.

== Academics ==
BNU offers undergraduate, graduate, and doctoral programmes. The university offer courses in Visual Design and Arts, Architecture, Liberal Arts, Computer Information Technology, Psychology, Mass Communication, and Hospitality Management. It is a member of the Higher Education Commission and the Association of Commonwealth Universities.

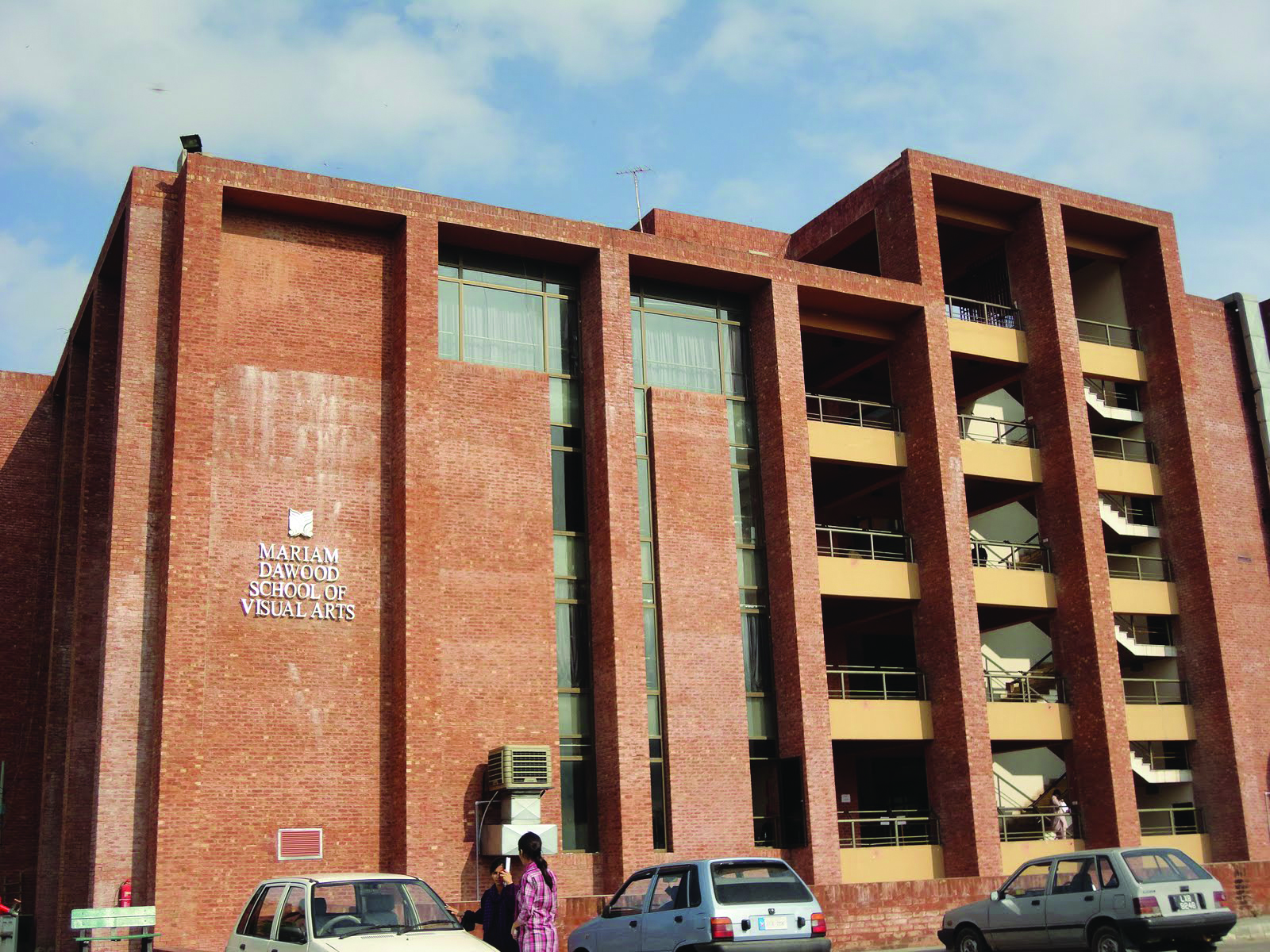
Mariam Dawood School of Visual Arts at BNU, Lahore

The university consists of the following eight schools:

- Mariam Dawood School of Visual Arts & Design (MDSVAD)
- Razia Hassan School of Architecture (RHSA)
- School of Media & Mass Communication (SMC)
- School of Management Sciences (SMS)
- Seeta Majeed School of Liberal Arts & Social Sciences (SLASS)
- School of Computer & Information Technology (SCIT)
- School of Education (SE)
- Institute of Psychology (IP)

== Administration ==
The current Vice-Chancellor is Moeed Yusuf, who previously served as Pakistan's National Security Council.

== Rankings ==
In the QS Asian University Rankings 2026, BNU was placed in the 1301-1400 band.

== Notable people ==
=== Alumni ===
- Dost Muhammad Khosa, politician
- Daniyal Raheel, actor
- Eman Suleman, actor and fashion model
- Gohar Rasheed, theatre, television and film actor
- Kubra Khademi, fine artist
- Zara Noor Abbas, actress
- Mooroo, musician, actor, vlogger
- Amar Khan, actress
- Zain Afzal, actor
- Sanam Saeed, theatre, television and film actor
- Haroon Shahid, actor and singer

=== Faculty ===
- Nayyar Ali Dada, architect.
- Tariq Rahman, Dean of School of Liberal Arts and Social Sciences in 2017; linguist.
- Asghar Nadeem Syed, Visiting Faculty at department of Theatre, Film and Television; he is a playwright, columnist, and author.
- Rashid Rana, School of Visual Arts and Design, artist.
