= National Security Advisor (Pakistan) =

Official advisory position in the Pakistan government

- Emblem of Pakistan

- Flag of Pakistan
- Incumbent; Lieutenant General Asim Malik, HI(M) since 30 April 2025
- Abbreviation: NSA
- Reports to: Prime Minister of Pakistan
- Seat: Prime Minister's Secretariat; National Security Division
- Appointer: Prime Minister of Pakistan
- Formation: 1969; 57 years ago
- First holder: Ghulam Umar
- Website: nsd.gov.pk

The National Security Advisor (NSA) is the senior official on the National Security Council of Pakistan, and the chief adviser to the Prime Minister of Pakistan on national security and international affairs. Lt Gen Asim Malik is the current NSA, appointed by Prime Minister Shehbaz Sharif on 30 April 2025.

The National Security Adviser participates in National Security Council to brief the participants on issues involving the national security of the country and regularly advise the Prime Minister on all matters relating to internal and external threats to the country, and oversees strategic issues. In addition, the adviser frequently accompanies the Prime Minister on foreign trips.

The National Security Adviser is supported by the National Security Division (NSD) at the Prime Minister's Secretariat in Islamabad that produces research and briefings for the National Security Adviser to review and present, either to the National Security Council or directly to the Prime Minister. The post was created in 1969 by then-President Yahya Khan with Major-General Ghulam Umar being the first adviser.

== List of National Security Advisers ==
No	Name	Designation	Term of Office	
1	Ghulam Umar	Chief of National Security	25 March 1969	20 December 1971
2	Akbar Khan	Minister of Internal Security	20 December 1971	22 June 1973
3	Tikka Khan	Minister of State for Defence and National Security	24 April 1977	5 July 1977
4	Ghulam Hassan Khan	Adviser on National Security	14 January 1978	5 July 1978
5	Iqbal Akhund	Adviser to the Prime Minister for Foreign Affairs & National Security	4 December 1988	6 August 1990
6	Mahmud Ali Durrani	Adviser to the Prime Minister on National Security	15 April 2008	7 January 2009
7	Sartaj Aziz	Adviser to the Prime Minister on National Security	7 June 2013	21 October 2015
8	Nasser Khan Janjua	National Security Adviser	22 October 2015	4 June 2018
C	Abdullah Hussain Haroon	Federal Minister for National Security (Caretaker)	5 June 2018	27 June 2018
C	Naeem Khalid Lodhi	Federal Minister for National Security (Caretaker)	27 June 2018	18 August 2018
9(I)	Moeed Yusuf	SAPM on National Security Division & Strategic Policy Planning	24 December 2019	16 May 2021
9(II)	Moeed Yusuf	National Security Adviser	17 May 2021	10 April 2022
10	Asim Malik	National Security Advisor	30 April 2025	Incumbent

== See also ==
- National Security Council
