= Moeed Yusuf =

Pakistani scholar and author

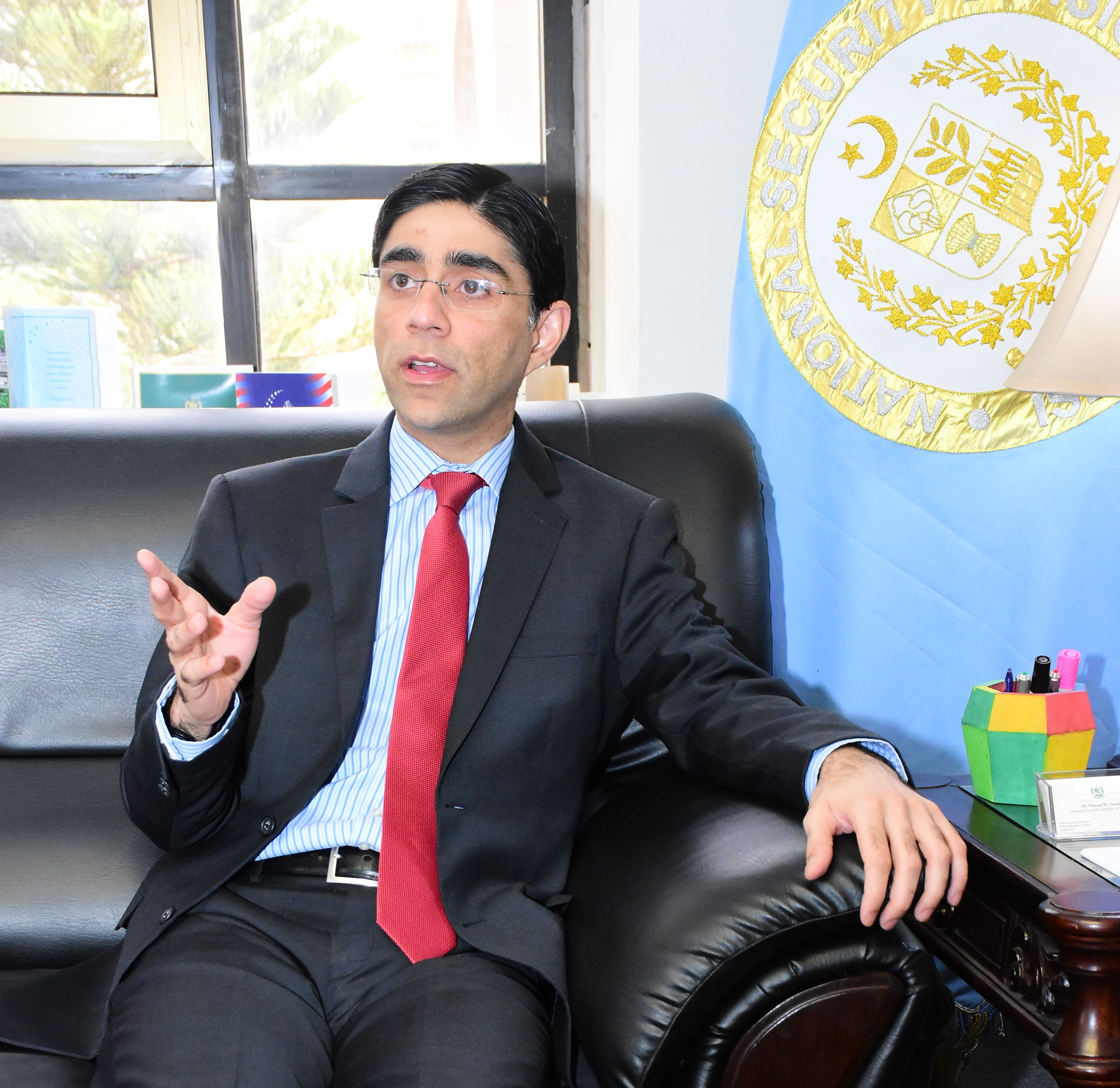
- Yusuf speaking to media in Islamabad

9th National Security Advisor of Pakistan
- In office 17 May 2021 – 10 April 2022
- President: Arif Alvi
- Prime Minister: Imran Khan
- Preceded by: Himself (as Special Assistant)
- Succeeded by: Asim Malik

Special Assistant to the Prime Minister for National Security & Strategy Planning
- In office 24 December 2019 – 17 May 2021
- Prime Minister: Imran Khan
- Preceded by: Nasir Khan Janjua

Personal details
- Born: Pakistan
- Education: Political science
- Alma mater: Boston University (M.A), (Ph.D)

Moeed W. Yusuf is a Pakistani national security scholar and administrator who is currently serving as the 3rd vice-chancellor of the Beaconhouse National University. Previously, he served as the 9th National Security Adviser to the Prime Minister of Pakistan. Previously he served in the capacity of a Special Assistant to the Prime Minister of Pakistan on the National Security Division and Strategic Policy Planning from 24 December 2019 to 16 May 2021.

Before joining the government, Yusuf was the Associate Vice President for Asia at the United States Institute of Peace in Washington, D.C., and previously a Fellow at the Frederick S. Pardee Center for the Study of the Longer-Range Future at the Pardee School of Global Studies at Boston University, and a Research Fellow at the Mossavar-Rahmani Center at Harvard University's Kennedy School.

== Early life and education ==
Yusuf was born into a family of doctors, including his grandparents, his parents and his sister, and lives in Washington, D.C. with his wife and three children.

He holds Bachelor of Business Administration from Shorter University; Masters and Doctor of Philosophy degrees from Boston University.

== Academic career ==
Yusuf has taught Political Science/International Relations at Boston University, George Washington University, the Lahore University of Management Sciences, and the Quaid-e-Azam University.

== Strategic policy and advisory career ==
On 25 September 2019, he was appointed as Chairperson of Pakistan's Strategic Policy Planning Cell under National Security Division for a two-year period.

On 24 December 2019, he was appointed as the Special Assistant to the Prime Minister of Pakistan on National Security Division and Strategic Policy Planning.

== Books ==
=== Author ===
- Brokering Peace in Nuclear Environments: U.S. Crisis Management in South Asia (2018)

=== Editor or co-editor ===
- Getting it Right in Afghanistan (2013)
- South Asia 2060: Envisioning Regional Futures (2013)
- Insurgency and Counterinsurgency in South Asia: From a Peacebuilding Lens (2014)
- Pakistan's Counter-Terrorism Challenge (2014)
