= Nadir Ali (comedian) =

Pakistani YouTuber, comedian

Nadir Ali Khan
- Born: Nadir Ali Khan
- Occupations: YouTube personality; comedian
- Spouse: Faiza Nadir
- Children: 1

YouTube information
- Channel: P 4 Pakao
- Years active: 2016–present
- Genres: Family; inspiration; comedy; pranks; vlogs
- Subscribers: 4.13 million
- Views: 1.79 billion
- Last updated: 8 March 2026

Nadir Ali (Urdu: نادر علی) is a Pakistani YouTube personality and comedian who is known for his channel P 4 Pakao.

== Personal life ==
Pakao Nadir Ali was born 1987 or 1988 to a Saraiki family, Nadir Ali is married to Faiza and has a son.

== Career ==
Prior to his YouTube career, he worked for a famous Pakistani prank show Zara Hut Kay which was aired on Metro TV. Nadir entertained people in the same way from 2010 to 2016. In 2016, Nadir began posting videos to YouTube. In 2020, the tax department notified him about some tax payments.

Nadir Ali has so far produced a large number of prank videos, the most of which were recorded in Karachi and only a small number in Lahore. He also recorded their prank videos in Sri Lanka, Thailand, Bangkok and in Dubai. In February 2024, he had an online conversation with well known Indian comedian, Kapil Sharma. In August 2023, along with the Pakistani actor Moammar Rana, he faced criticism over social media due to his podcast with the actor who made offensive comments about Indian actress Priyanka Chopra. In September 2024, hosted an interview with the scholar Zakir Naik.
