= Consulate-General of Pakistan, Dubai =

Consulate-General of Pakistan, Dubai
- Location: Dubai, United Arab Emirates
- Address: Khalid Bin Waleed Road, P.O. BOX No. 340, Bur Dubai
- Jurisdiction: Dubai and northern Emirates
- Consul General: Mr. Hussain Muhammad
- Website: Consulate-General of Pakistan, Dubai

The Consulate-General of Pakistan, Dubai is a diplomatic mission of Pakistan in Dubai, United Arab Emirates. The consulate serves the emirate of Dubai and the five surrounding Northern Emirates of Sharjah, Ajman, Umm al-Quwain, Fujairah and Ras al-Khaimah. It is one of two Pakistani diplomatic missions in the UAE, the other being the Pakistani embassy in Abu Dhabi, to which it reports. The current Consul-General is Mr. Hussain Muhammad.

== Consular services ==
The Pakistani community in Dubai numbers over 400,000, forming around 13% of the local population and constituting the third largest ethnicity in the city. The Consulate-General oversees Pakistani interests in Dubai and provides various services to Pakistani citizens in the emirate. It is the largest Pakistani consulate in the Middle East. It is located at Khalid bin Waleed Road in the Bur Dubai district. Consular services provided include the receiving, processing and delivery of documentation, including machine readable passports, manual passports, NADRA identity documents, attestation and visas. The consulate operates from Sunday to Thursday, with the operational hours ranging from early morning to afternoon. It remains closed on public holidays.

The consulate-general provides liaison with the various Pakistani associations in Dubai and the northern Emirates, including the Pakistan Association Dubai, Pakistan Association Ladies Wing (Dubai), Pakistan Professionals Wing, Pakistan Business Council (Dubai), and various Pakistani community centres. It also promotes trade, commerce and investment between Pakistan and Dubai. A Community Welfare Wing is attached with the consulate-general, which provides welfare services to Pakistanis residing in Dubai and the northern Emirates. These include general community welfare services, facilitating remittances, dispatching bodies of deceased persons, and settlement of issues relating to the Pakistani labour workforce working in Dubai and the northern Emirates.

Cultural events such as Pakistan's Independence Day are celebrated each year, during which the Consul-General of Pakistan in Dubai unfurls the national flag at the consulate in a ceremony.

=== Education ===
The consulate-general oversees the provision of all Pakistani-curriculum education in Dubai and the northern Emirates. There are currently 12 Pakistani international schools throughout Dubai and its adjacent emirates, four of which were established by the consulate-general and the remainder eight privately. The schools predominately provide education to the children of Pakistani expatriates, teaching from junior grades up to the higher secondary level. The curriculum is affiliated with the Federal Board of Intermediate and Secondary Education (FBISE) and the syllabus is English-medium. The schools are listed below:

- His Highness Shaikh Rashid Al Maktoum Pakistan School, Dubai
- Pakistan Islamiah Higher Secondary School, Sharjah
- Pakistan Higher Secondary School, Ras al-Khaimah
- Pakistan Islamiah Higher Secondary School, Fujairah
- Pakistan Education Academy, Dubai
- Al Farooq Pakistan School, Dubai
- Pakistan English School, Dubai
- Al Amaal Pakistan English, School, Sharjah
- Pakistan Islamiah Higher Secondary School, Ajman
- Omer Bin Khatab Pakistan School, Ajman

== See also ==
- Pakistan–United Arab Emirates relations
- Embassy of Pakistan, Abu Dhabi
- List of diplomatic missions of Pakistan
- List of diplomatic missions in Dubai
