= Pakistanis in the United Arab Emirates =

Ethnic group

Total population
- 1,500,000 (2017); 12.53% of the UAE's population

Regions with significant populations
- Abu Dhabi · Dubai · Sharjah · Al Ain · Ras Al Khaimah

Languages
- Urdu (Note: Also known as Lashkari (لشکری)) · Punjabi · Pashto · Sindhi · Balochi · Saraiki · Pahari-Pothwari · Brahui · Kashmiri · Arabic · English · other Pakistani languages

Religion
- Islam (predominantly) · Christianity · Hinduism

Pakistanis in the United Arab Emirates include expatriates from Pakistan who have settled in the United Arab Emirates (UAE). With a population of over 1.5 million, Pakistanis are the second largest national group in the UAE after Indians, constituting 12.5% of the country's total population. They are the third largest overseas Pakistani community, behind the Pakistani diaspora in Saudi Arabia and the United Kingdom. The population is diverse and consists of people from all over Pakistan, including Punjab, Sindh, Balochistan, Khyber Pakhtunkhwa and former FATA, Azad Kashmir and Gilgit Baltistan. The majority of Pakistanis in the UAE are Muslim, with significant minorities of Christians, Hindus and other religions. The majority are found in Dubai and Abu Dhabi respectively, while a significant population is spread out in Sharjah and the remaining Northern Emirates. Dubai alone accounts for a Pakistani population of 400,000.

== Background ==
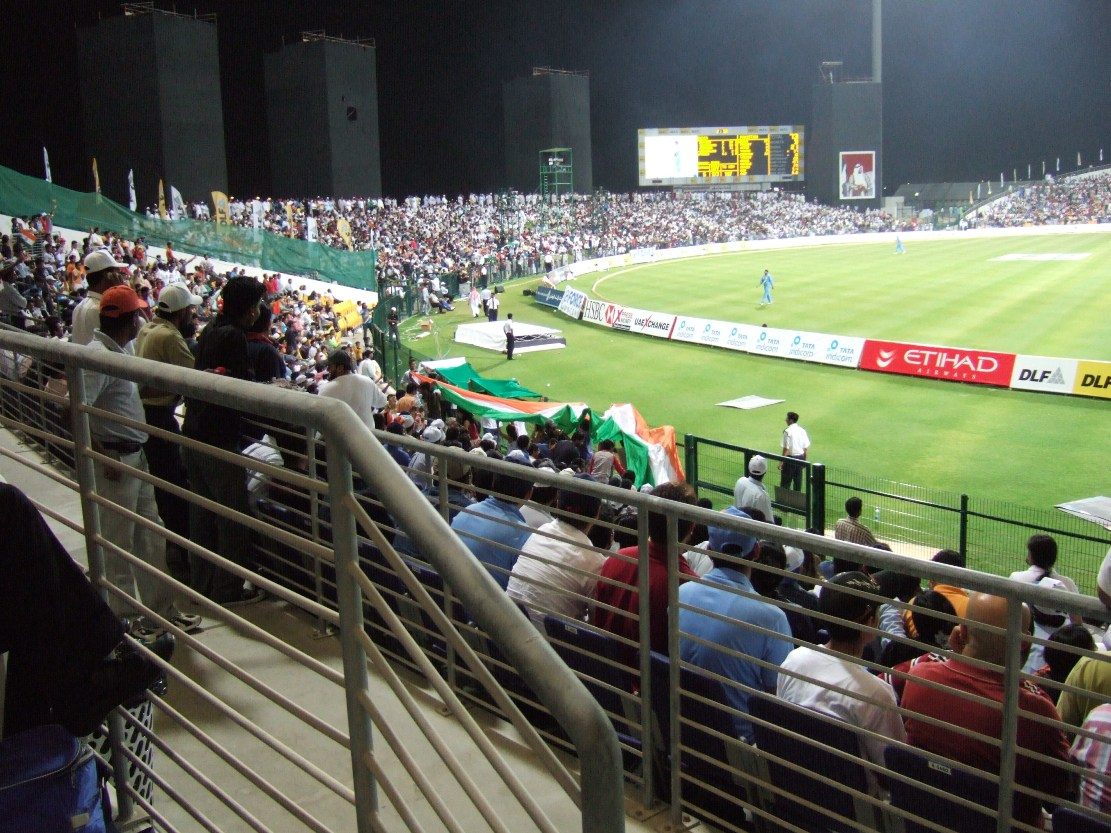
A Pakistan vs. India cricket match at the Sheikh Zayed Cricket Stadium in Abu Dhabi

From the time when heavy Pakistani migration occurred to the Middle East, a number of Pakistanis went to the UAE. While many tend to be skilled and semi-skilled professionals, most are unskilled migrant workers. Pakistanis outnumber Emirati nationals in three of UAE's emirates: Dubai, Sharjah and Ajman.

== Demographics ==
Pakistani ethnic groups with significant populations include Punjabis, Pashtuns, Sindhis, Baloch, Muhajirs and smaller populations of Saraikis, Kashmiris, Hindkowans and other ethnic groups. There are also smaller populations of Pakistani expatriates from other countries who live and work in the UAE, such as British Pakistanis and Pakistani Canadians.

== Society ==
=== Economic contributions ===
==== General overview ====
Pakistan and the UAE maintain strong economic relations with each other, with the UAE being the second biggest trading partner of Pakistan in terms of bilateral trade. A large skilled and semi-skilled Pakistani workforce contributes to the UAE economy. Around 20% of Pakistanis are white-collar professions, and the remaining 80% are involved in the blue-collar industry. The ratio of blue-collar Pakistani labour migrating to the UAE has dropped since 2008, although the volume of remittances has increased.

Pakistani expatriates in the UAE are actively involved in the country's business, investment and services sectors; in 2025 there were some 47,000 Pakistani-owned businesses registered in the UAE, including more than 8,000 in a year.

The UAE is the second largest source of remittances to Pakistan; in 2012, remittances from the UAE amounted to $2.9 billion.

==== Pakistani professionals ====
Pakistan ranks among the top five sources of migrant professionals in the UAE. Pakistanis in UAE dominate the transport sector i.e. from logistics to crane operators and up to taxi drivers. There are many Pakistani bankers working in various local and multinational banks. It is not uncommon to find Pakistani professionals working in various multinationals in UAE. There are many Pakistani restaurants in UAE owned and run by these expatriate Pakistanis.

==== Assets ====
In September 2018, Pakistan’s Supreme Court was informed that Pakistani nationals held an estimated US $150 billion in assets and properties in the UAE, according to a report presented by chartered accountancy firm A.F. Ferguson. The figure was disclosed during proceedings related to a case on overseas holdings and bank accounts, with Chief Justice Mian Saqib Nisar noting the large sum remained abroad despite a recent amnesty scheme. A separate summary in the court’s written order placed the estimated value of Pakistani-owned assets in the UAE at about US $110 billion.

==== Property holdings ====
The UAE is a major investment destination for Pakistan. Pakistanis are among the top ten investors in the UAE property market, ranking as the second largest nationality that bought most property in Dubai. Over the years, many wealthy Pakistanis have bought expensive properties in Dubai and have second homes there; in 2024, following data leaks, it was estimated that 17,000 Pakistanis have bought 23,000 properties in Dubai, their collective property holdings estimated at $11 billion, while Dawn News asserted higher estimates based on academics using the data and additional sources, with 22,000 Pakistanis having property holdings worth $12,5 billion.

==== "Modern slavery" ====
See Migrant workers in the United Arab Emirates

The UAE is widely reported to be complicit in a modern-day slave trade of from Pakistan workers. There continues to be very little sharing of oil despite energy shortages in Pakistan and unflexible nationality guidelines for anybody wanted to move on from Pakistani citizenship.

=== Community representation ===
There are number of organisations which represent Pakistanis in UAE. Some of them are as follows:

1. Pakistanis in Dubai - PID [largest Facebook community group)
2. Pakistan Business Council (PBC)
3. Pakistan Association of Dubai (PAD)
4. Pakistan Professional Wing (PPW)
5. Institute of Chartered Accountants of Pakistan (ICAP)- UAE Chapter Wing
6. Institute of Business Administration (IBA) Alumni - UAE Chapter

=== Culture ===
The Pakistani community in the UAE celebrates Independence Day with much fervour. Urdu, being the national language of Pakistan, is a principal language of the community.

== Deportation ==
Between April and May 2026, the UAE increased its efforts to find and detain Pakistani expatriates, especially those from the Shia community, by using a method of systematic sectarian profiling. Security forces reportedly used biometric data and digital surveillance to target individuals based on names commonly associated with the Shia community, as well as their involvement in Imambargahs or religious events. Those identified often ended up being detained without any formal charges or legal help during early morning raids at their homes and workplaces. Many reported that their phones were taken right away to prevent them from contacting their families or embassies. The way these removals were carried out involved a coordinated "asset stripping" process, where the UAE government froze the bank accounts of thousands of Shia professionals before they were expelled. Detainees were moved through different detention facilities and holding centers where they reportedly faced tough conditions and physical abuse, often losing their residency status and life savings in just a few days. After being processed, around 15,000 individuals were forcibly put on flights back to Pakistan, often arriving with just the clothes on their backs and no access to the financial resources they had built up over many years of living in the Emirates.

== Notable citizens ==
- Khuzaima Tanveer, Emirati cricketer

== See also ==
- Pakistan – United Arab Emirates relations
- Embassy of Pakistan, Abu Dhabi
- Consulate-General of Pakistan, Dubai
- Overseas Pakistani
