= List of diplomatic missions of Pakistan =

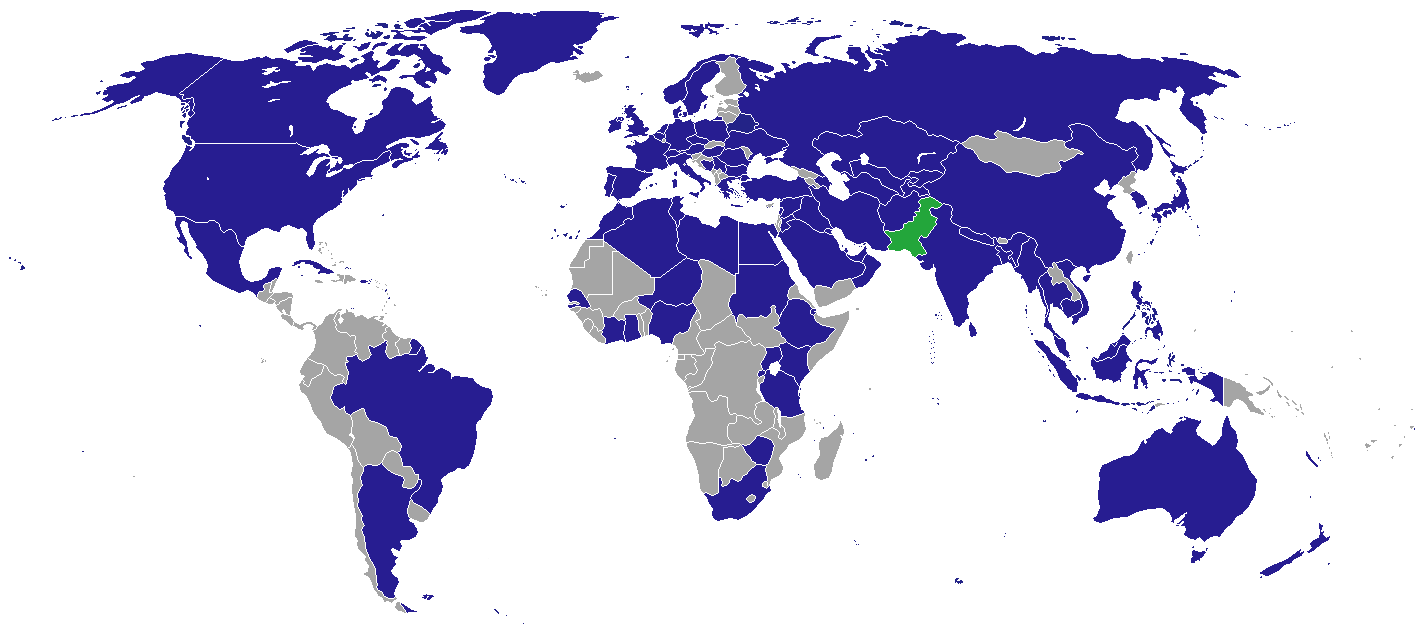
Diplomatic missions of Pakistan Countries that host a Pakistani embassy or high commission Countries that do not host Pakistani missions Islamic Republic of Pakistan

This is a list of diplomatic missions of Pakistan, excluding honorary consulates. As the second-most populous country in the Muslim world, Pakistan has an extensive and large diplomatic network around the world.

As a member of the Commonwealth of Nations, Pakistani diplomatic missions in the capitals of other Commonwealth members are known as High Commissions.

In November 2021 Pakistan announced establishment of five new diplomatic missions in Africa as a part of its "Engaged Africa policy" which included missions in Mali, Uganda, Burkina Faso, Benin and Djibouti.

== Current missions ==
=== Africa ===
Host country	Host city	Mission	Concurrent accreditation	Ref.
Algeria	Algiers	Embassy	Countries: Mali	
Djibouti	Djibouti City	Embassy	Countries: Eritrea; Somalia; Multilateral Organizations: Intergovernmental Authority on Development	
Egypt	Cairo	Embassy	Multilateral Organizations: Arab League	
Ethiopia	Addis Ababa	Embassy	Multilateral Organizations: African Union (Note: Accredited as an observer mission.)	
Ghana	Accra	High Commission	Countries: Benin; Togo	
Ivory Coast	Abidjan	Embassy	Countries: Guinea; Liberia; Sierra Leone	
Kenya	Nairobi	High Commission	Multilateral Organizations: United Nations; United Nations Environment Programme; United Nations Human Settlements Programme	
Libya	Tripoli	Embassy	Countries: Burkina Faso	
Libya	Benghazi	Consulate-General	Countries: Burkina Faso	
Mauritius	Port Louis	High Commission	Countries: Comoros; Madagascar; Seychelles	
Morocco	Rabat	Embassy	Countries: Mauritania	
Niger	Niamey	Embassy		
Nigeria	Abuja	High Commission	Countries: Cameroon; Equatorial Guinea; Gabon	
Rwanda	Kigali	High Commission	Countries: Angola; Burundi	
Senegal	Dakar	Embassy	Countries: Cape Verde; Gambia; Guinea-Bissau	
South Africa	Pretoria	High Commission	Countries: Botswana; Eswatini; Lesotho; Mozambique	
Sudan	Khartoum	Embassy	Countries: Chad	
Tanzania	Dar Es Salaam	High Commission	Multilateral Organizations: East African Community	
Tunisia	Tunis	Embassy	Countries: Malta	
Uganda	Kampala	High Commission	Countries: Central African Republic; South Sudan	
Zimbabwe	Harare	Embassy	Countries: Congo-Kinshasa; Malawi; Namibia; Zambia	

=== Americas ===
Host country	Host city	Mission	Concurrent accreditation	Ref.
Argentina	Buenos Aires	Embassy	Countries: Chile; Ecuador; Peru; Paraguay; Uruguay	
Brazil	Brasília	Embassy	Countries: Colombia; Guyana; Suriname; Venezuela	
Canada	Ottawa	High Commission		
Canada	Montreal	Consulate-General		
Canada	Toronto (Note: Located in the Toronto suburb of Vaughan.)	Consulate-General		
Canada	Vancouver	Consulate-General		
Cuba	Havana	Embassy	Countries: Antigua and Barbuda; Dominica; Grenada; Haiti; Honduras; Nicaragua; Trinidad and Tobago	
Mexico	Mexico City	Embassy	Countries: Belize; Costa Rica; El Salvador; Guatemala; Panama	
United States	Washington, D.C.	Embassy (Note: Serves as protecting power for Iran.)	Countries: Bahamas; Dominican Republic; Jamaica; Multilateral Organizations: Organization of American States	
United States	Chicago	Consulate-General	Countries: Bahamas; Dominican Republic; Jamaica; Multilateral Organizations: Organization of American States	
United States	Houston	Consulate-General	Countries: Bahamas; Dominican Republic; Jamaica; Multilateral Organizations: Organization of American States	
United States	Los Angeles	Consulate-General	Countries: Bahamas; Dominican Republic; Jamaica; Multilateral Organizations: Organization of American States	
United States	New York City	Consulate-General	Countries: Bahamas; Dominican Republic; Jamaica; Multilateral Organizations: Organization of American States	

=== Asia ===
Host country	Host city	Mission	Concurrent accreditation	Ref.
Afghanistan	Kabul	Embassy		
Afghanistan	Herat	Consulate-General		
Afghanistan	Jalalabad	Consulate-General		
Afghanistan	Kandahar	Consulate-General		
Afghanistan	Mazar-i-Sharif	Consulate-General		
Azerbaijan	Baku	Embassy	Countries: Georgia	
Bahrain	Manama	Embassy		
Bangladesh	Dhaka	High Commission	Countries: Bhutan	
Brunei	Bandar Seri Begawan	High Commission		
Cambodia	Phnom Penh	Embassy		
China	Beijing	Embassy	Countries: Mongolia	
China	Chengdu	Consulate-General	Countries: Mongolia	
China	Guangzhou	Consulate-General	Countries: Mongolia	
China	Hong Kong	Consulate-General	Countries: Mongolia	
China	Shanghai	Consulate-General	Countries: Mongolia	
India	New Delhi	High Commission		
Indonesia	Jakarta	Embassy	Countries: Timor-Leste; Multilateral Organizations: Association of Southeast Asian Nations	
Iran	Tehran	Embassy		
Iran	Zahedan	Consulate-General		
Iran	Mashhad	Consulate		
Iraq	Baghdad	Embassy		
Japan	Tokyo	Embassy		
Jordan	Amman	Embassy	Countries: Palestine	
Kazakhstan	Astana	Embassy		
Kuwait	Kuwait City	Embassy		
Kyrgyzstan	Bishkek	Embassy		
Lebanon	Beirut	Embassy	Countries: Cyprus	
Malaysia	Kuala Lumpur	High Commission		
Maldives	Malé	High Commission		
Myanmar	Yangon	Embassy		
Nepal	Kathmandu	Embassy		
Oman	Muscat	Embassy		
Philippines	Manila	Embassy		
Qatar	Doha	Embassy		
Saudi Arabia	Riyadh	Embassy		
Saudi Arabia	Jeddah	Consulate-General		
Singapore	Singapore	High Commission		
South Korea	Seoul	Embassy		
Sri Lanka	Colombo	High Commission		
Syria	Damascus	Embassy		
Tajikistan	Dushanbe	Embassy		
Thailand	Bangkok	Embassy		
Turkey	Ankara	Embassy	Countries: Kosovo	
Turkey	Istanbul	Consulate-General	Countries: Kosovo	
Turkmenistan	Ashgabat	Embassy		
United Arab Emirates	Abu Dhabi	Embassy	Countries: Armenia	
United Arab Emirates	Dubai	Consulate-General	Countries: Armenia	
Uzbekistan	Tashkent	Embassy		
Vietnam	Hanoi	Embassy	Countries: Laos	

=== Europe ===
Host country	Host city	Mission	Concurrent accreditation	Ref.
Austria	Vienna	Embassy	Countries: Slovakia; Multilateral Organizations: United Nations; International Atomic Energy Agency (IAEA); United Nations Industrial Development Organization (UNIDO); United Nations Office on Drugs and Crime (UNODC)	
Belarus	Minsk	Embassy		
Belgium	Brussels	Embassy	Countries: Luxembourg; Multilateral Organizations: European Union	
Bosnia and Herzegovina	Sarajevo	Embassy	Countries: Croatia	
Bulgaria	Sofia	Embassy	Countries: North Macedonia	
Czechia	Prague	Embassy		
Denmark	Copenhagen	Embassy		
France	Paris	Embassy	Countries: Monaco; Multilateral Organizations: UNESCO	
Germany	Berlin	Embassy		
Germany	Frankfurt	Consulate-General		
Germany	Munich	Consulate-General		
Greece	Athens	Embassy		
Hungary	Budapest	Embassy		
Ireland	Dublin	Embassy		
Italy	Rome	Embassy	Countries: Albania; San Marino; Slovenia; Multilateral Organizations: Food and Agriculture Organization; International Fund for Agricultural Development; World Food Programme	
Italy	Milan	Consulate-General	Countries: Albania; San Marino; Slovenia; Multilateral Organizations: Food and Agriculture Organization; International Fund for Agricultural Development; World Food Programme	
Netherlands	The Hague	Embassy		
Norway	Oslo	Embassy	Countries: Iceland	
Poland	Warsaw	Embassy	Countries: Estonia; Latvia; Lithuania	
Portugal	Lisbon	Embassy		
Romania	Bucharest	Embassy	Countries: Moldova	
Russia	Moscow	Embassy		
Serbia	Belgrade	Embassy	Countries: Montenegro	
Spain	Madrid	Embassy	Countries: Andorra	
Spain	Barcelona	Consulate-General	Countries: Andorra	
Sweden	Stockholm	Embassy	Countries: Finland	
Switzerland	Bern	Embassy	Countries: Holy See; Liechtenstein	
Ukraine	Kyiv	Embassy		
United Kingdom	London	High Commission	Multilateral Organizations: Commonwealth of Nations	
United Kingdom	Manchester	Consulate-General	Multilateral Organizations: Commonwealth of Nations	
United Kingdom	Birmingham	Consulate	Multilateral Organizations: Commonwealth of Nations	
United Kingdom	Bradford	Consulate	Multilateral Organizations: Commonwealth of Nations	
United Kingdom	Glasgow	Consulate	Multilateral Organizations: Commonwealth of Nations	

=== Oceania ===
Host country	Host city	Mission	Concurrent accreditation	Ref.
Australia	Canberra	High Commission	Countries: Fiji; Nauru; Papua New Guinea; Solomon Islands; Vanuatu	
Australia	Melbourne	Consulate-General	Countries: Fiji; Nauru; Papua New Guinea; Solomon Islands; Vanuatu	
Australia	Sydney	Consulate-General	Countries: Fiji; Nauru; Papua New Guinea; Solomon Islands; Vanuatu	
New Zealand	Wellington	High Commission	Countries: Kiribati; Samoa; Tonga	

=== Multilateral organizations ===
Organization	Host city	Host country	Mission	Concurrent accreditation	Ref.
Organisation of Islamic Cooperation	Jeddah	Saudi Arabia	Permanent Mission		
United Nations	New York City	United States	Permanent Mission		
United Nations	Geneva	Switzerland	Permanent Mission	Multilateral Organizations: Conference on Disarmament; World Health Organization; World Intellectual Property Organization	
World Trade Organization	Geneva	Switzerland	Permanent Mission		

== Gallery ==
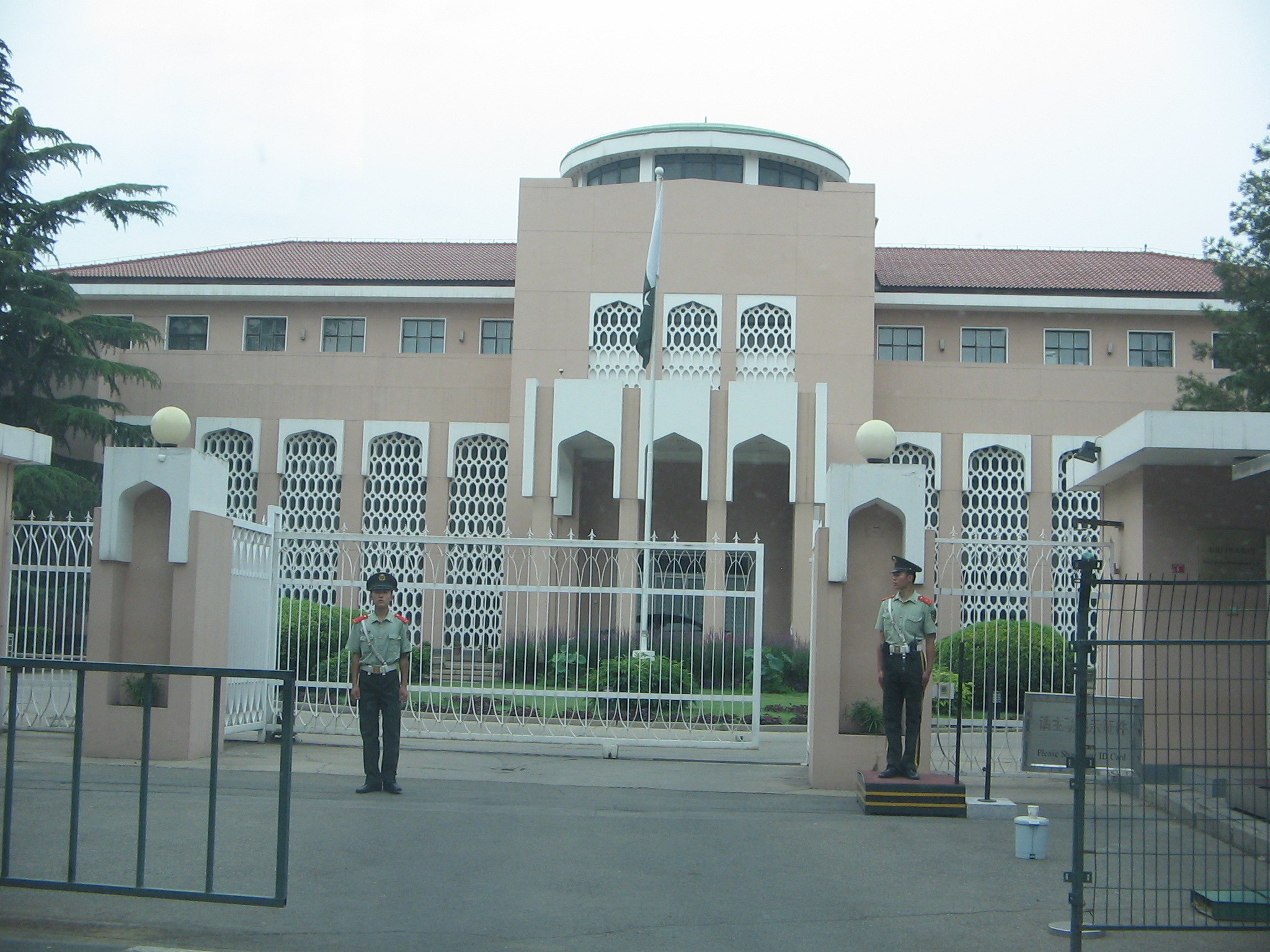
Embassy in Beijing

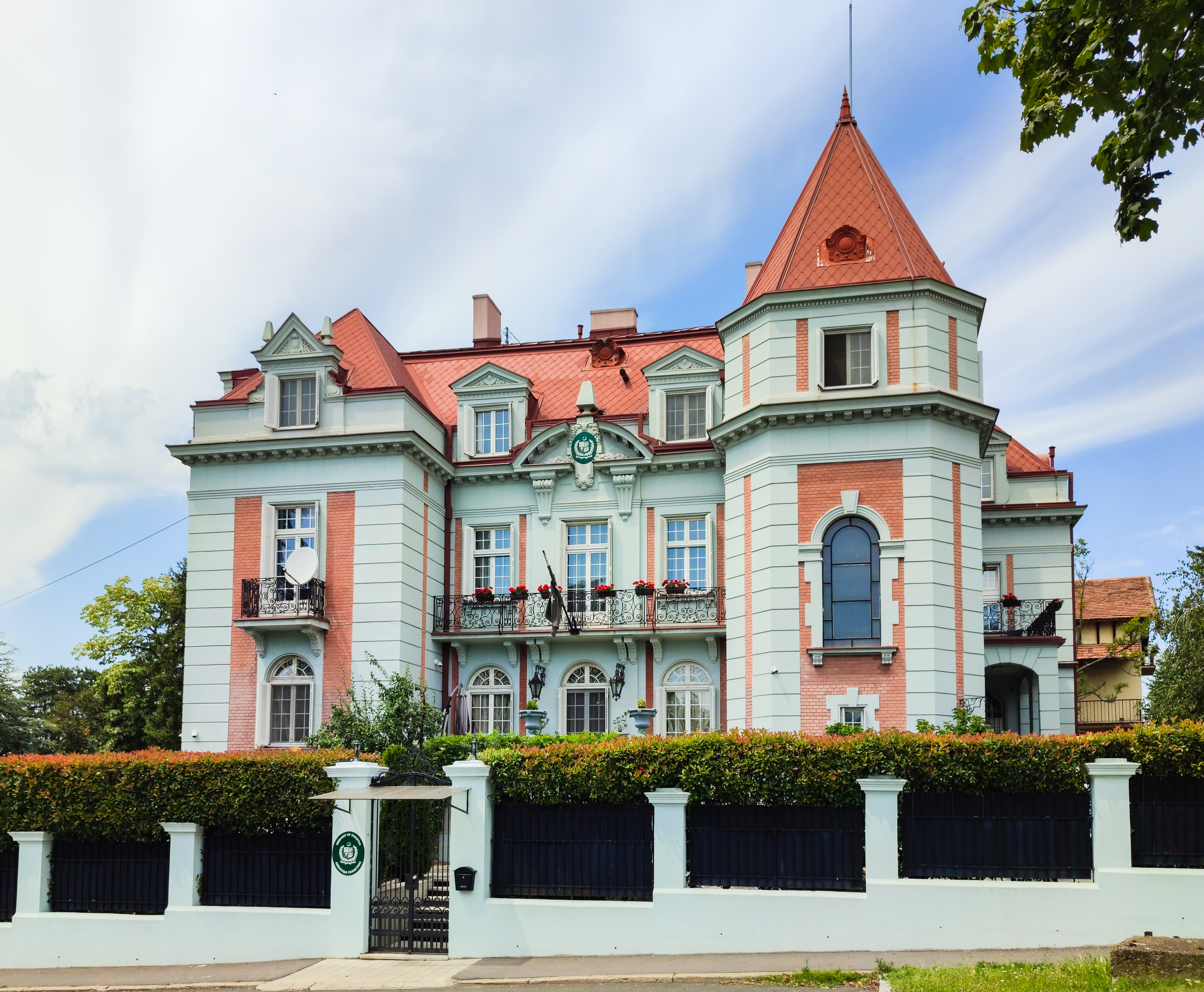
Embassy in Belgrade

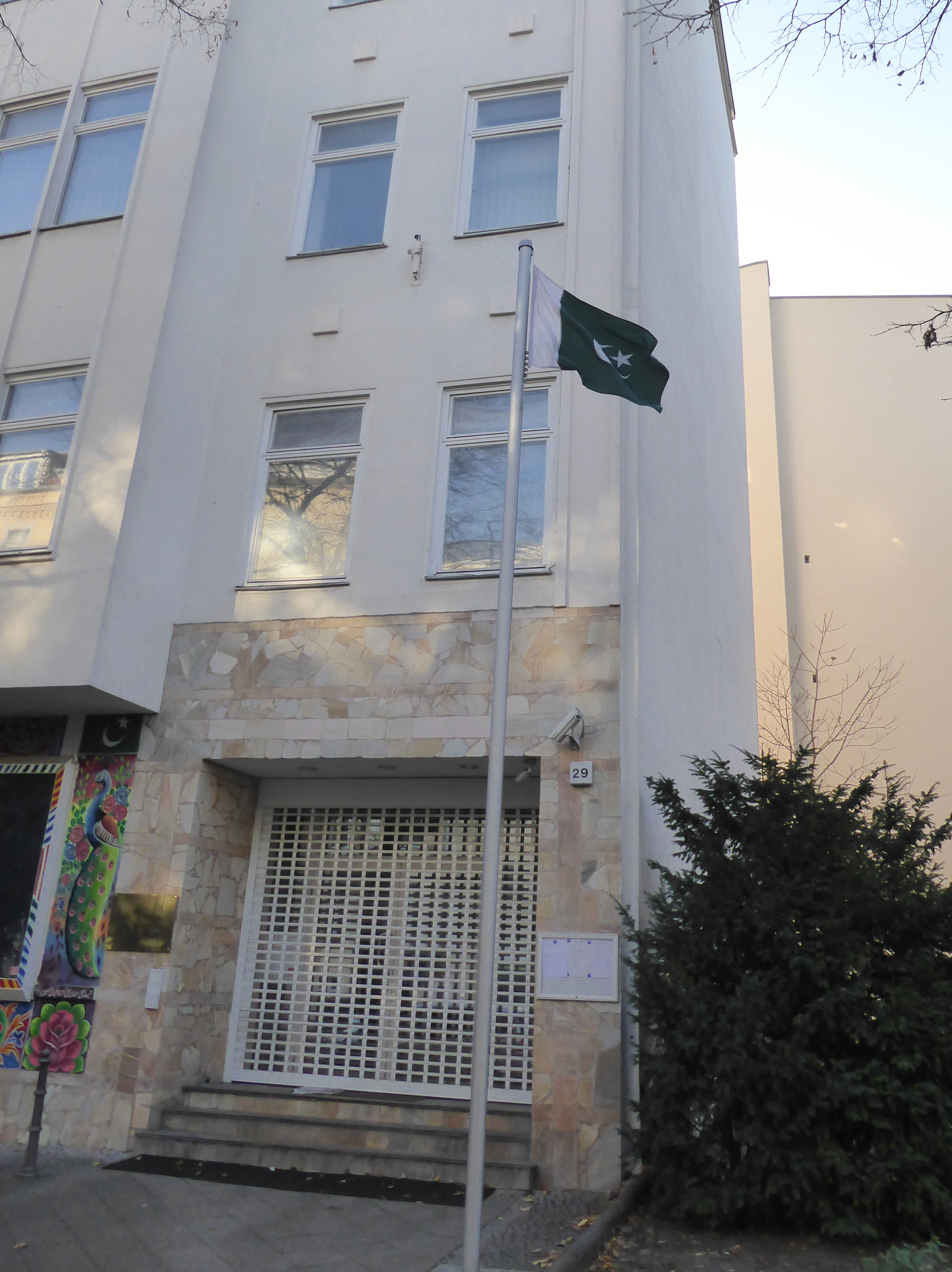
Embassy in Berlin

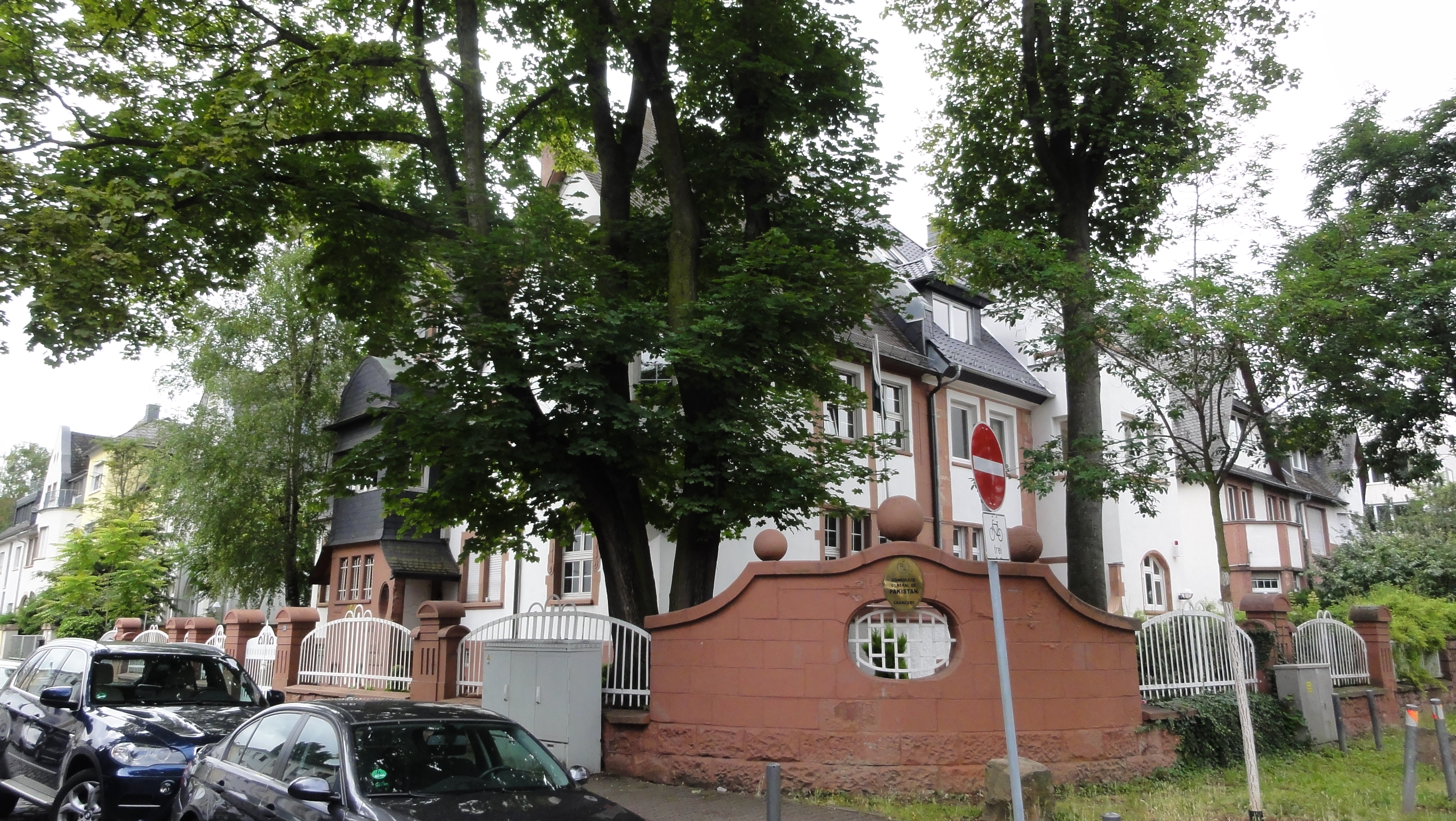
Consulate-General in Frankfurt

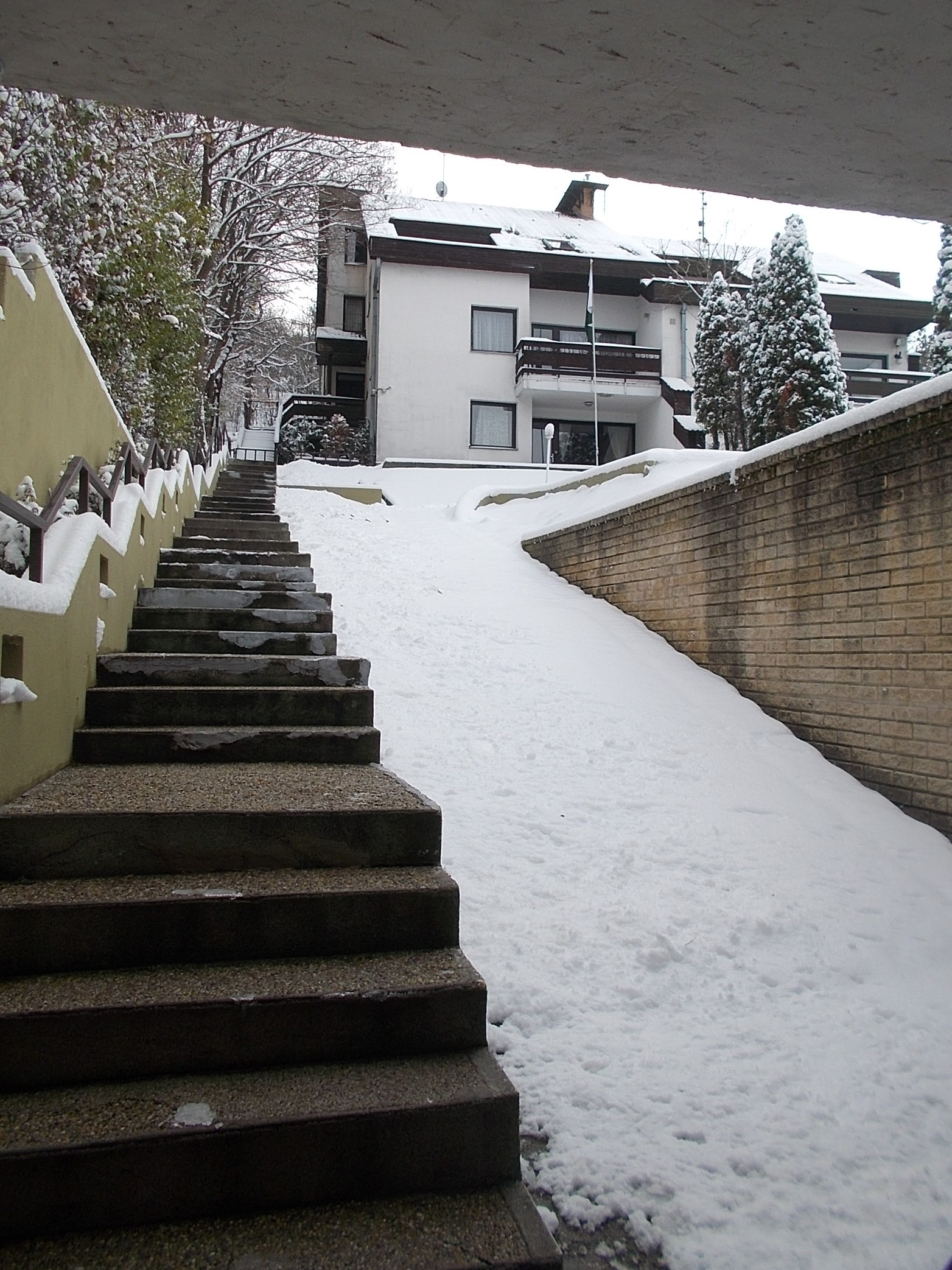
Embassy in Budapest

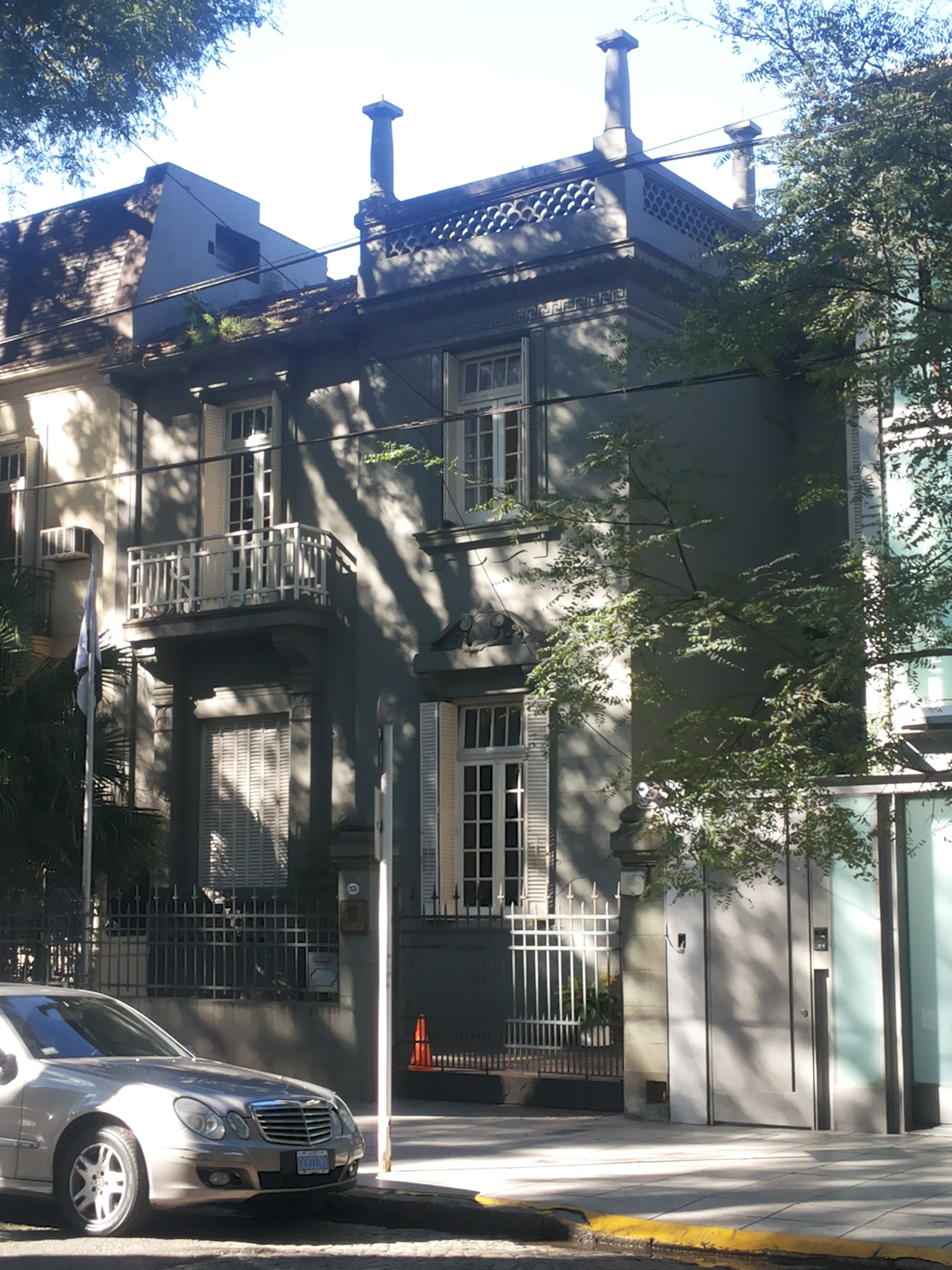
Embassy in Buenos Aires

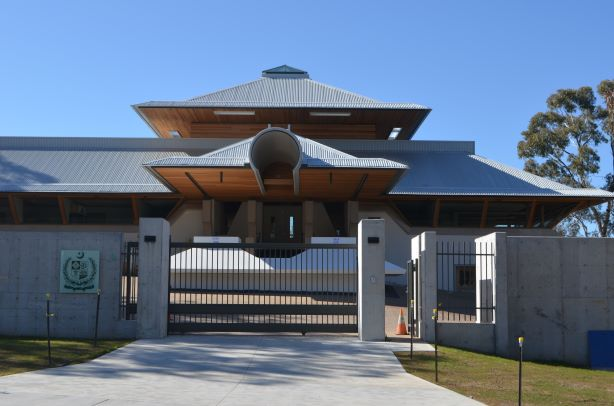
High Commission in Canberra

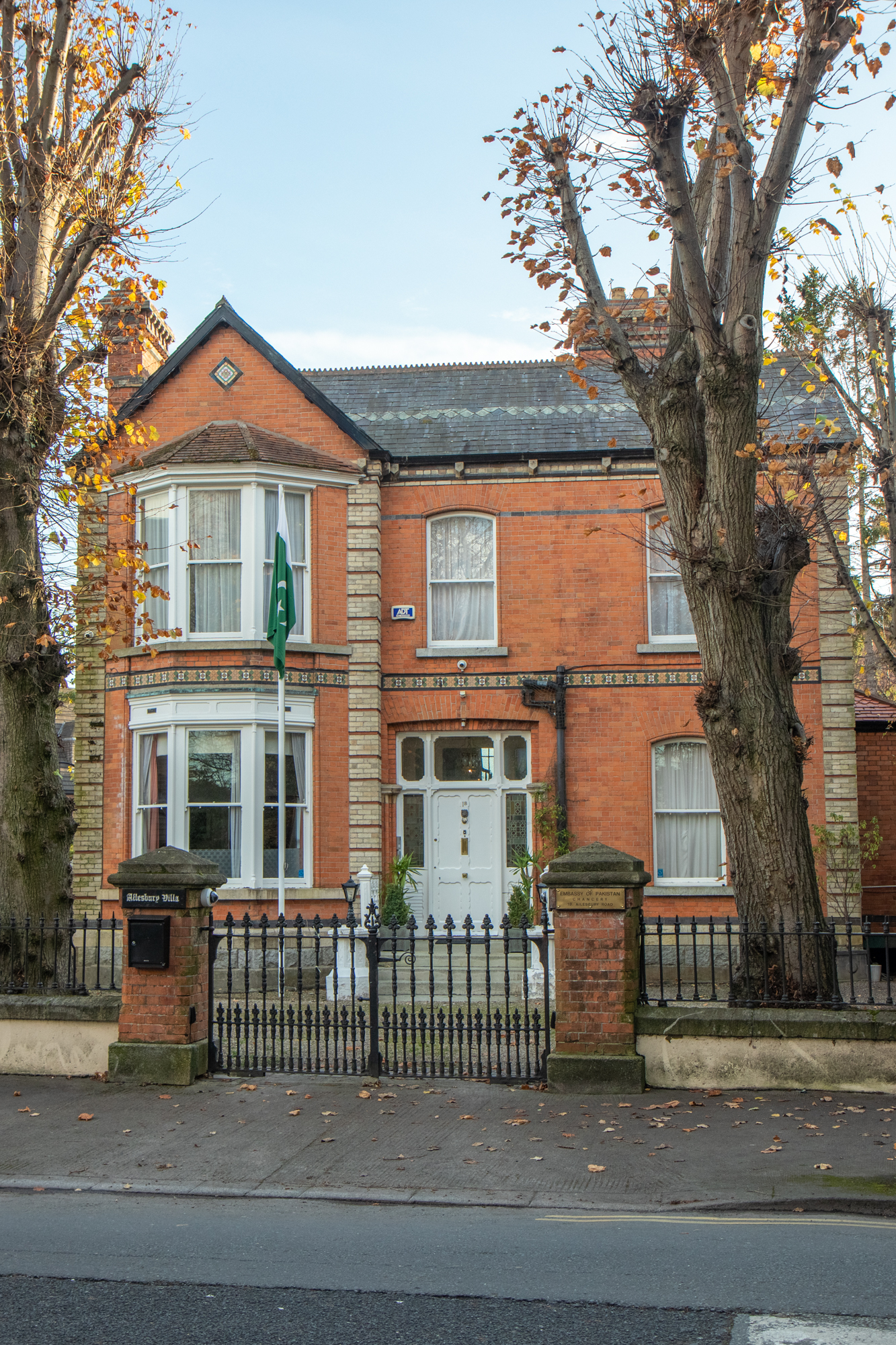
Embassy in Dublin

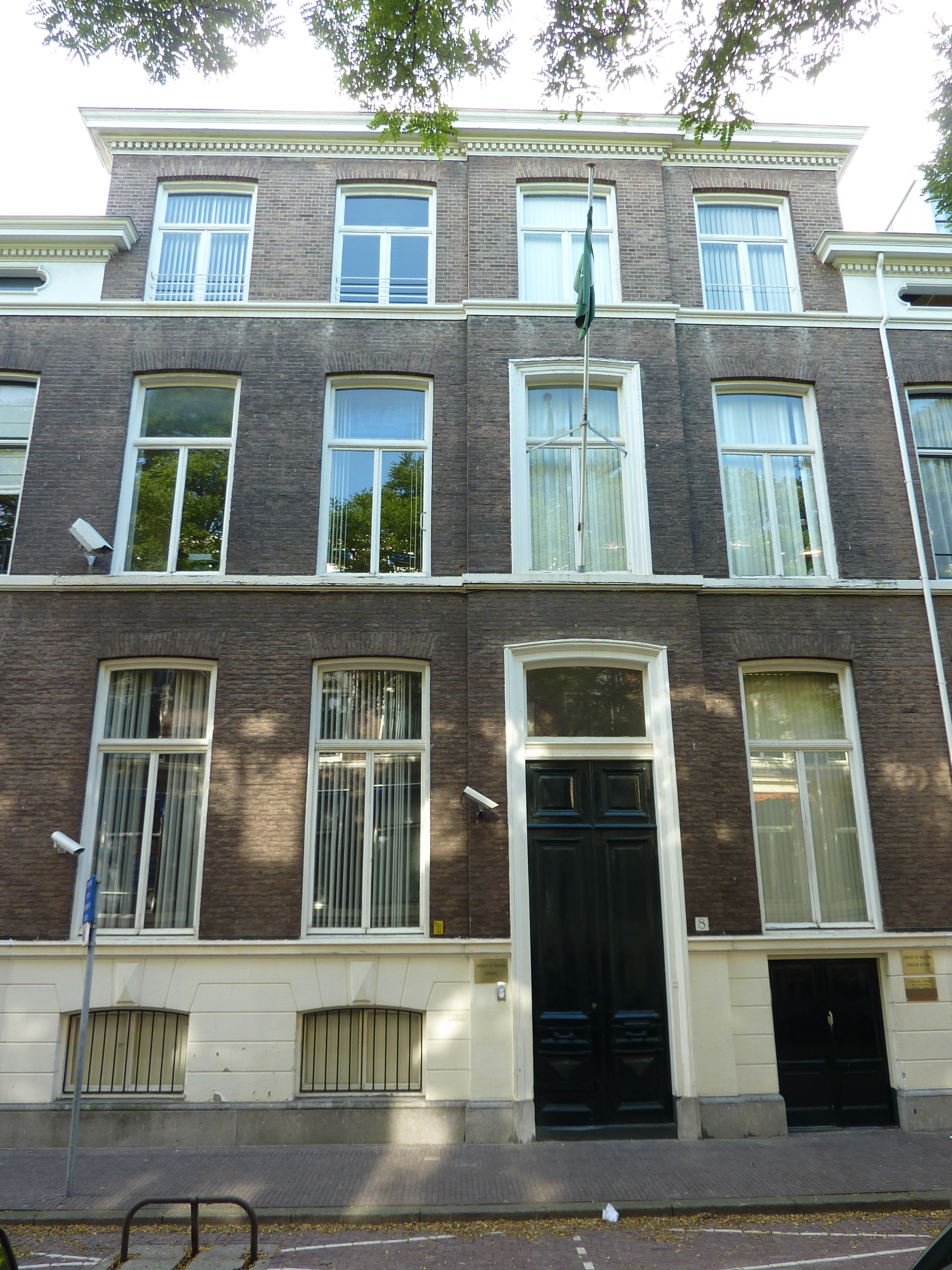
Embassy in The Hague

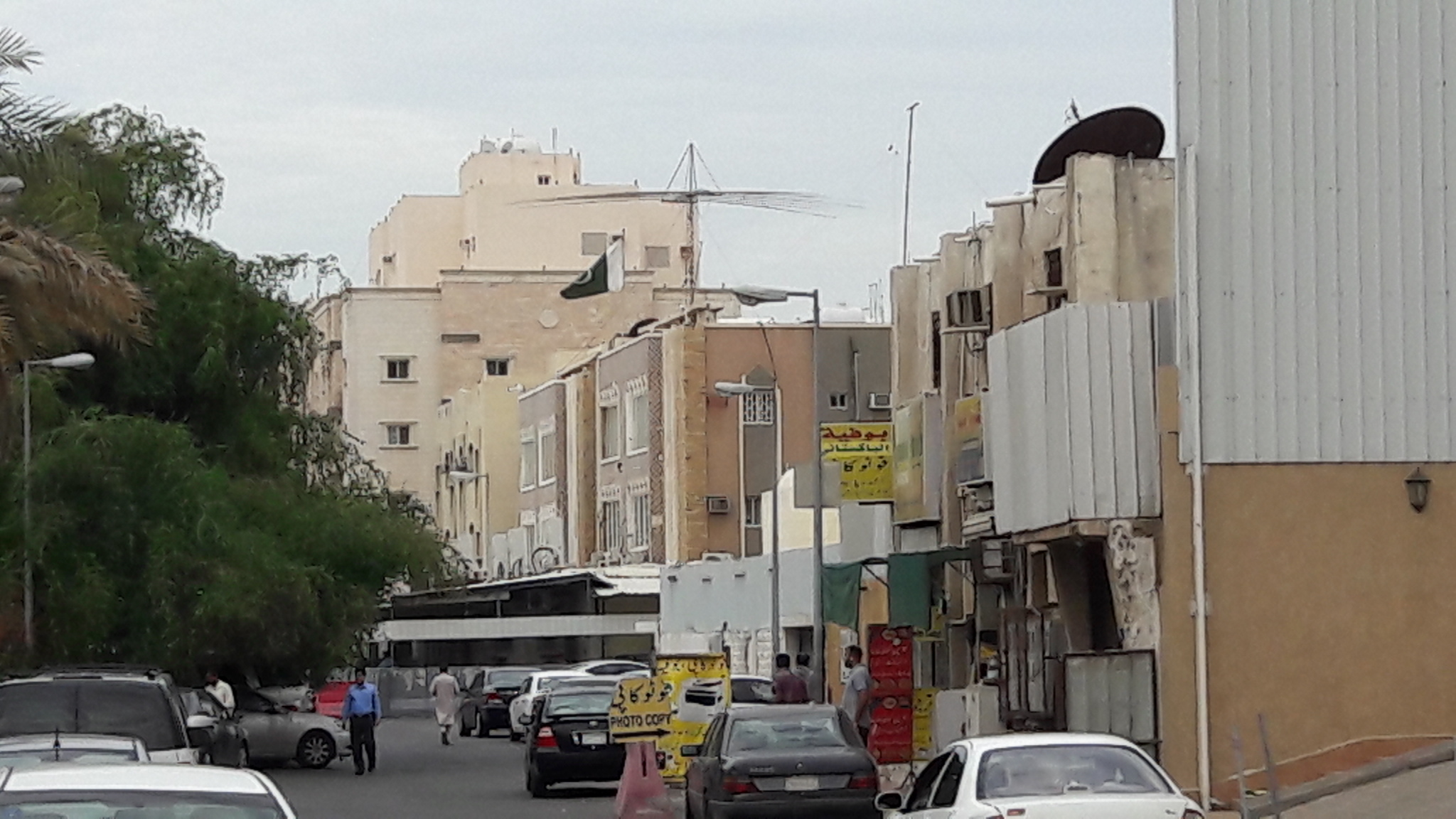
Consulate-General in Jeddah

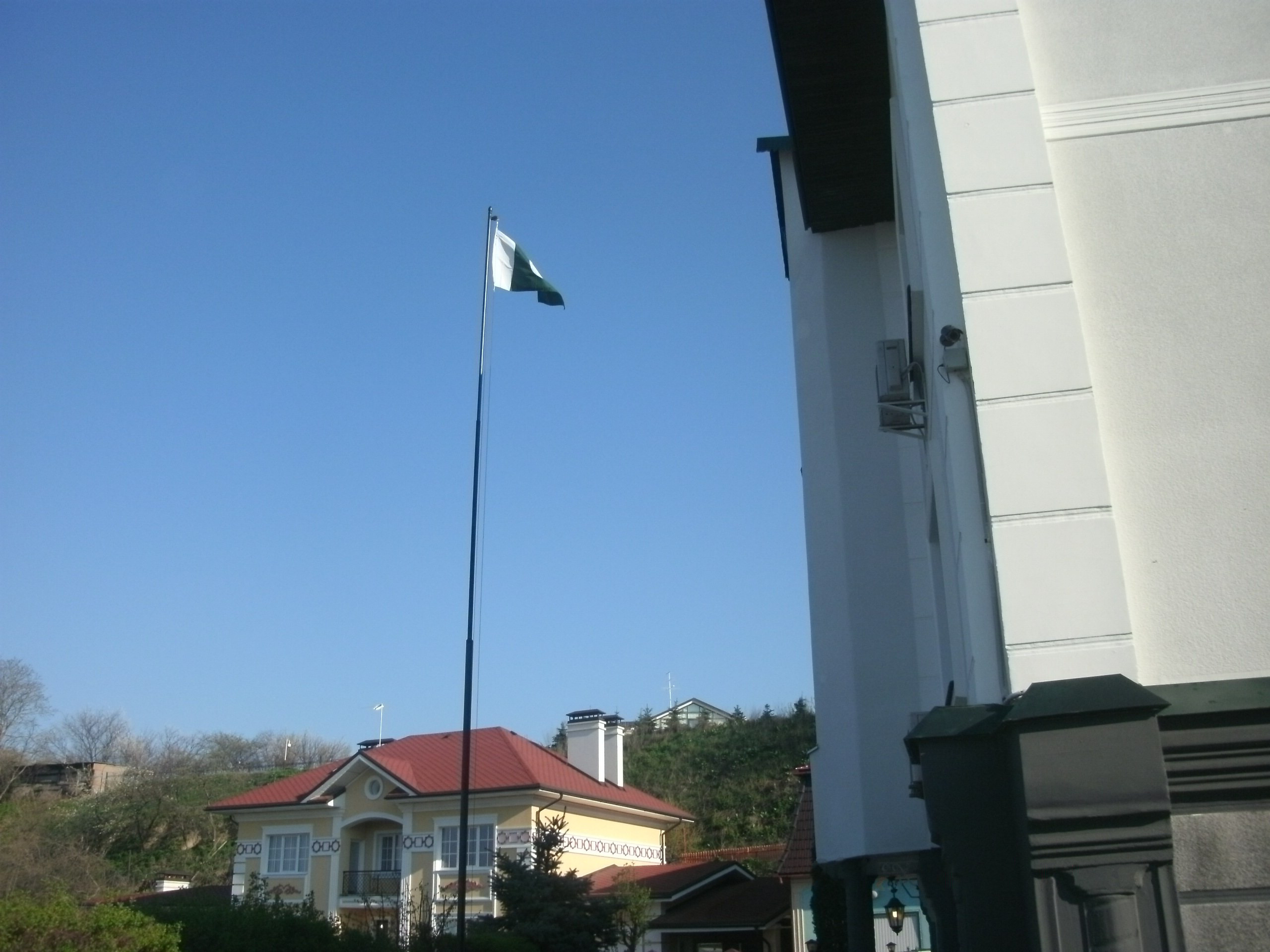
Embassy in Kyiv

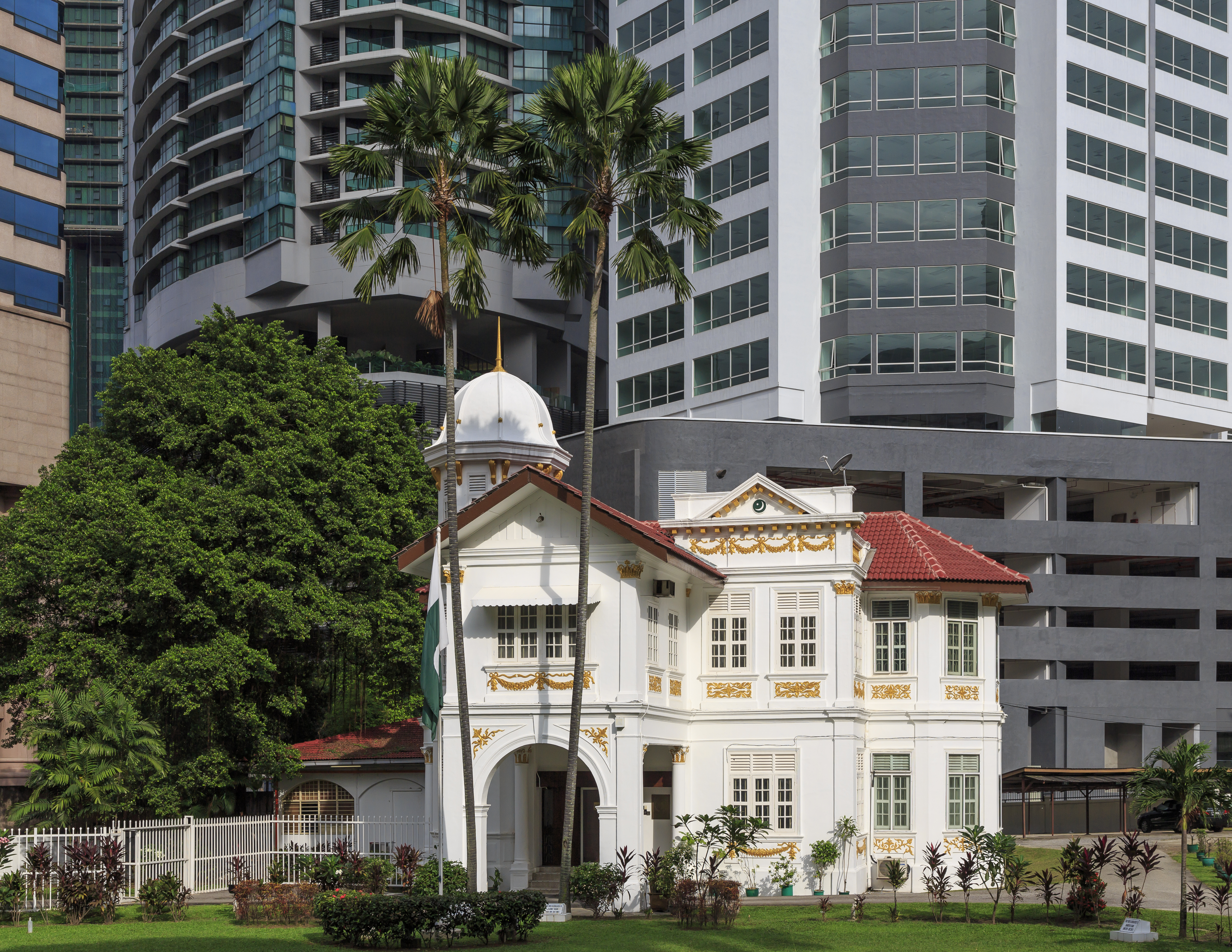
High Commission in Kuala Lumpur

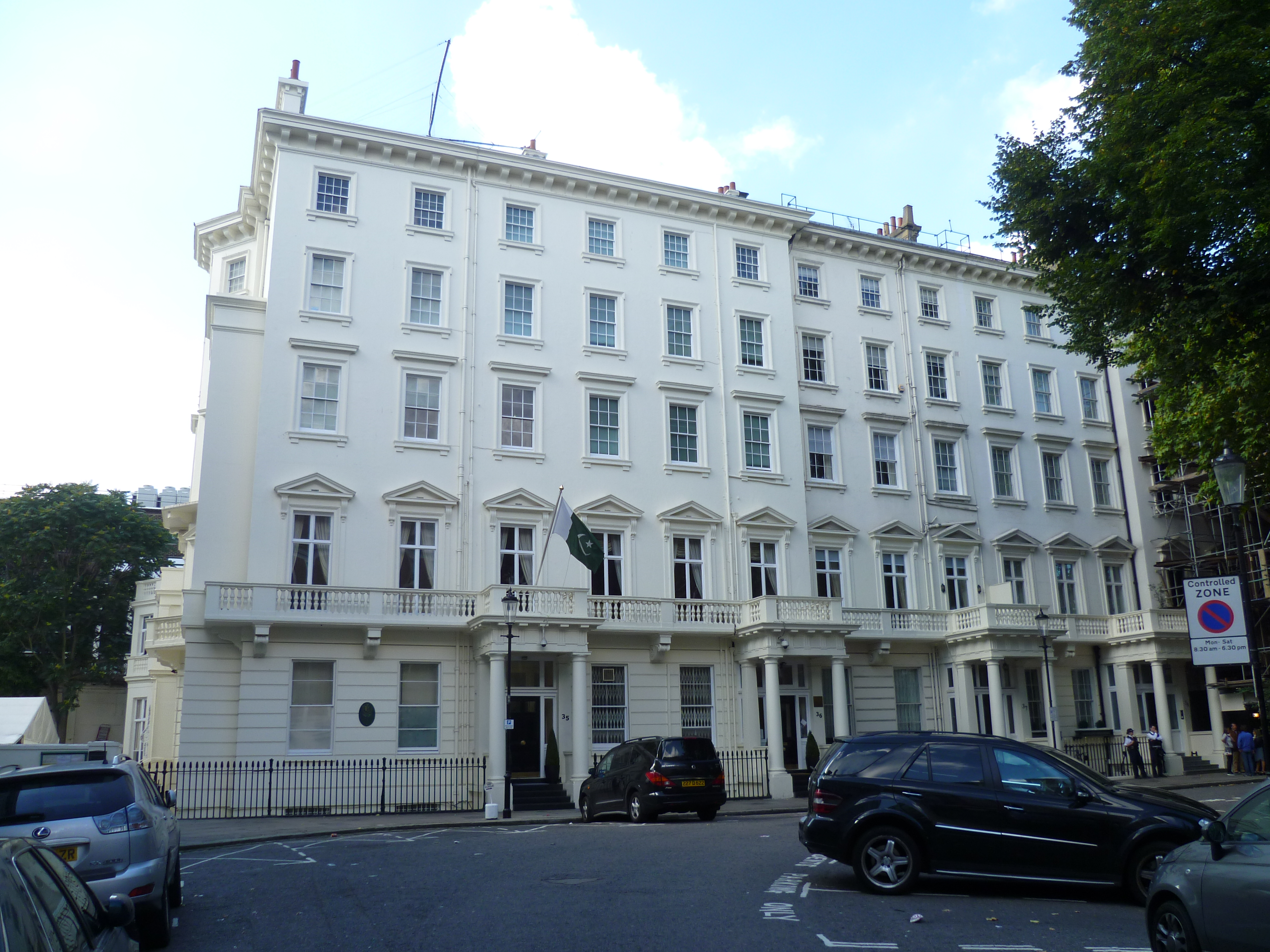
High Commission in London

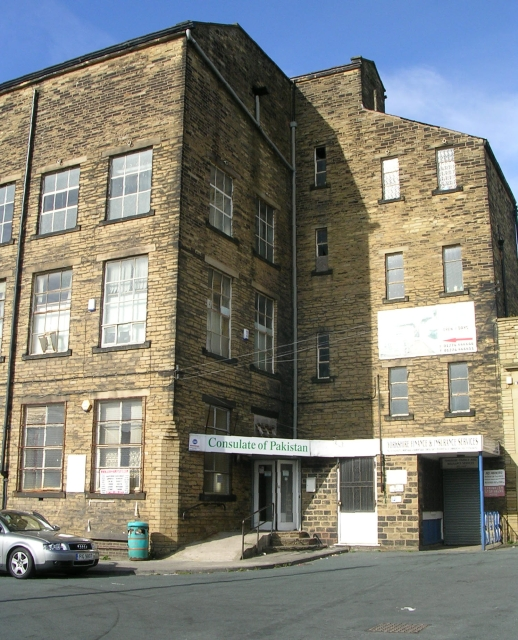
Consulate in Bradford

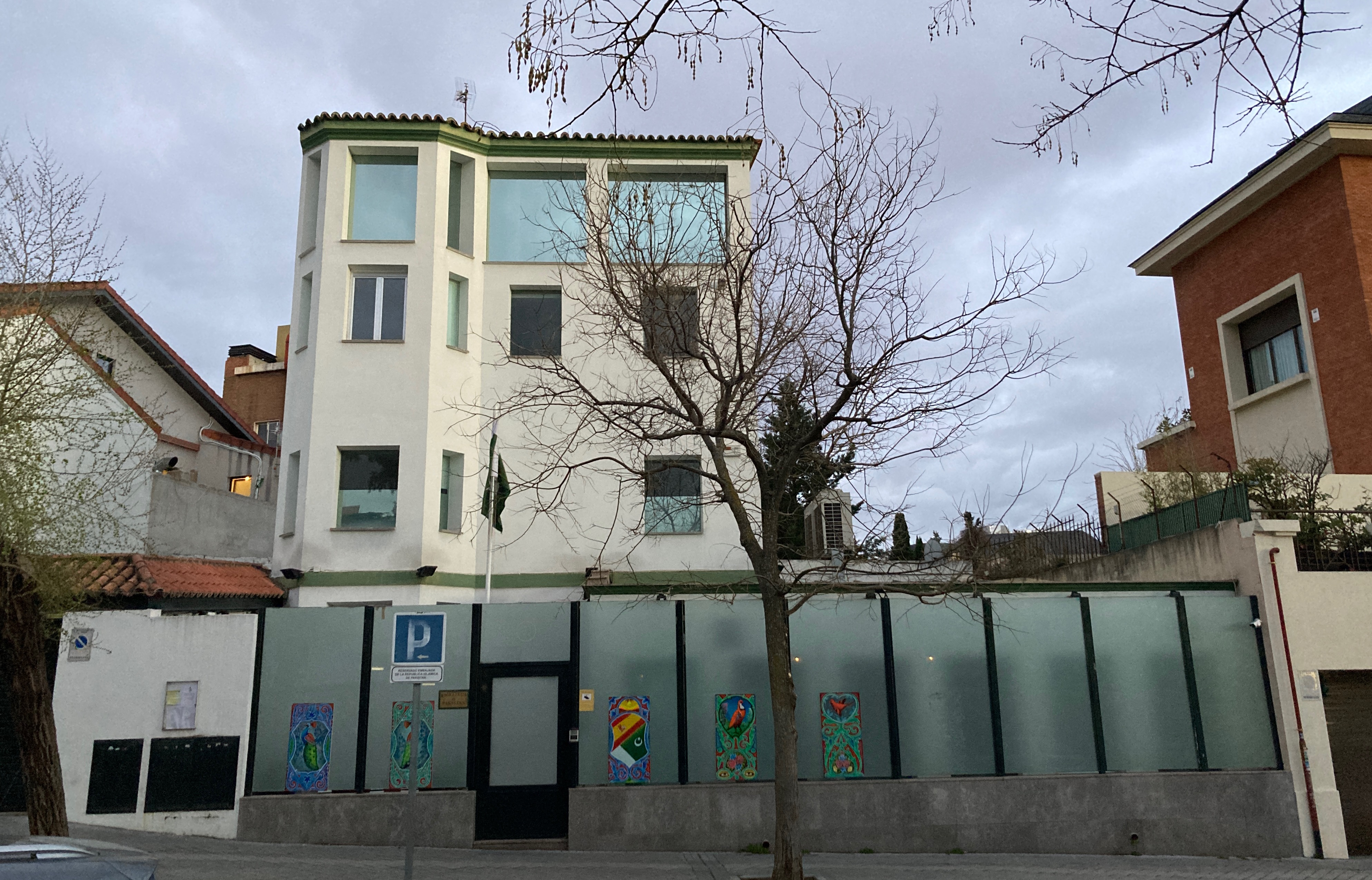
Embassy in Madrid

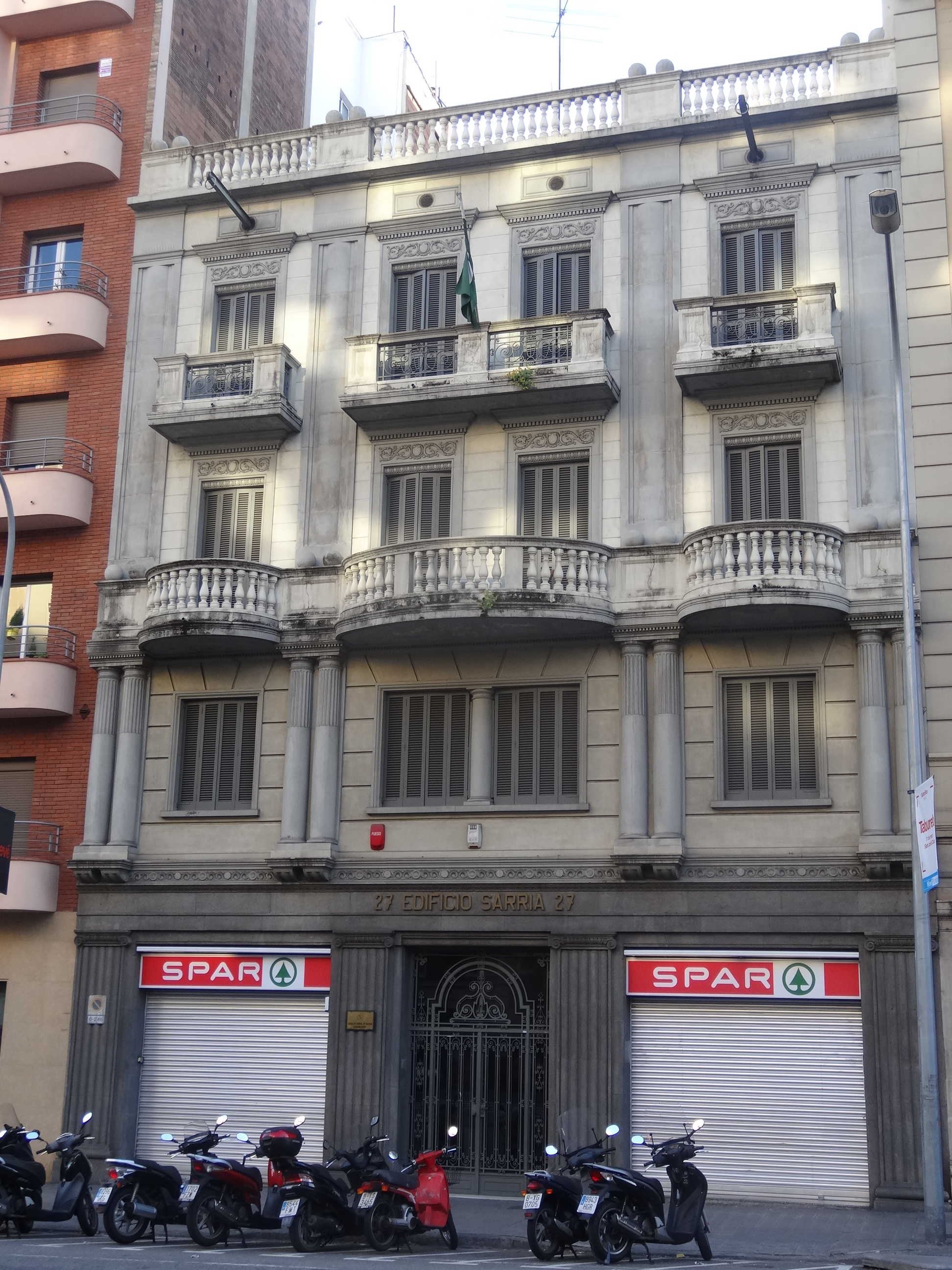
Building hosting the Consulate-General in Barcelona

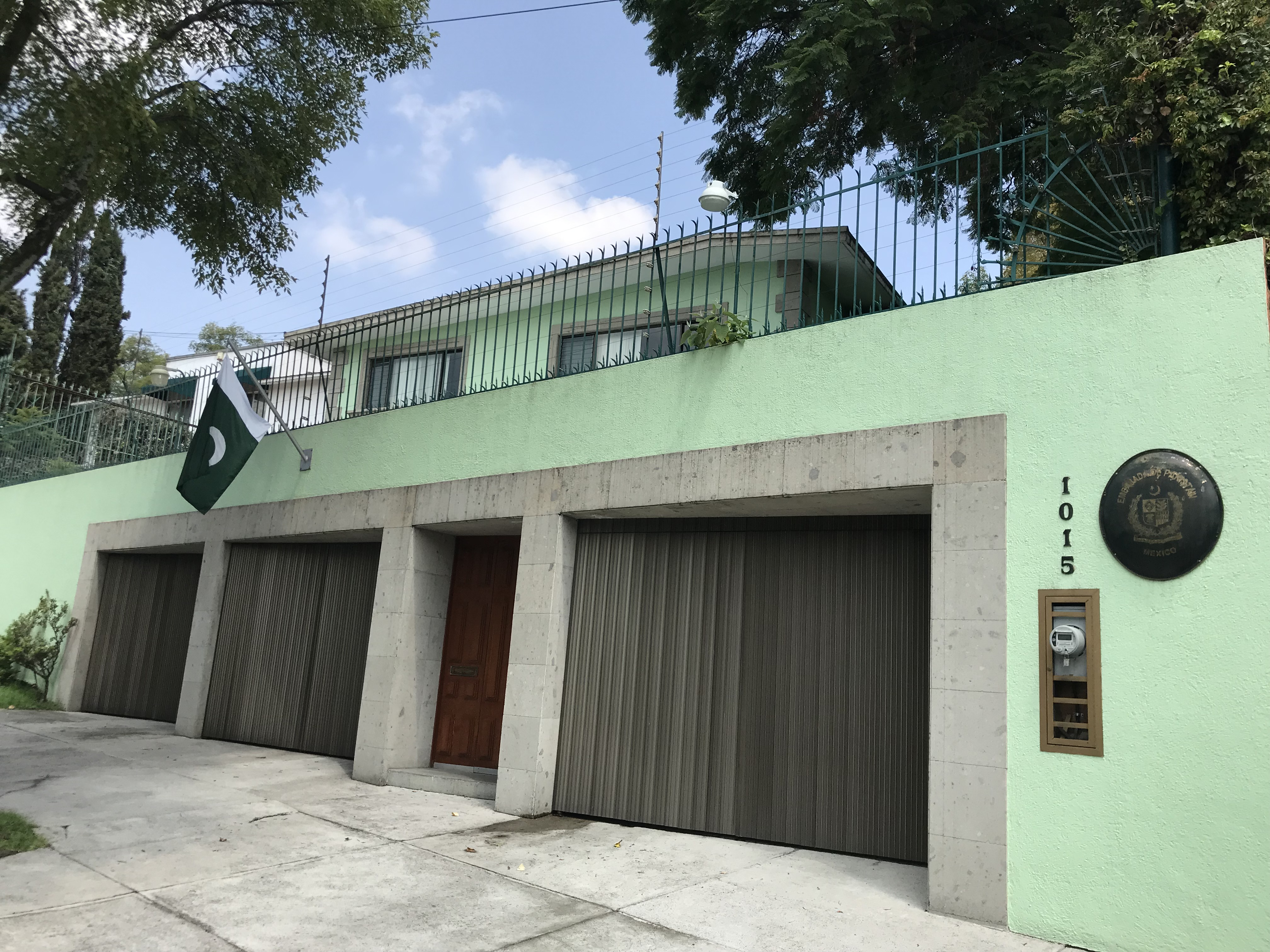
Embassy in Mexico City

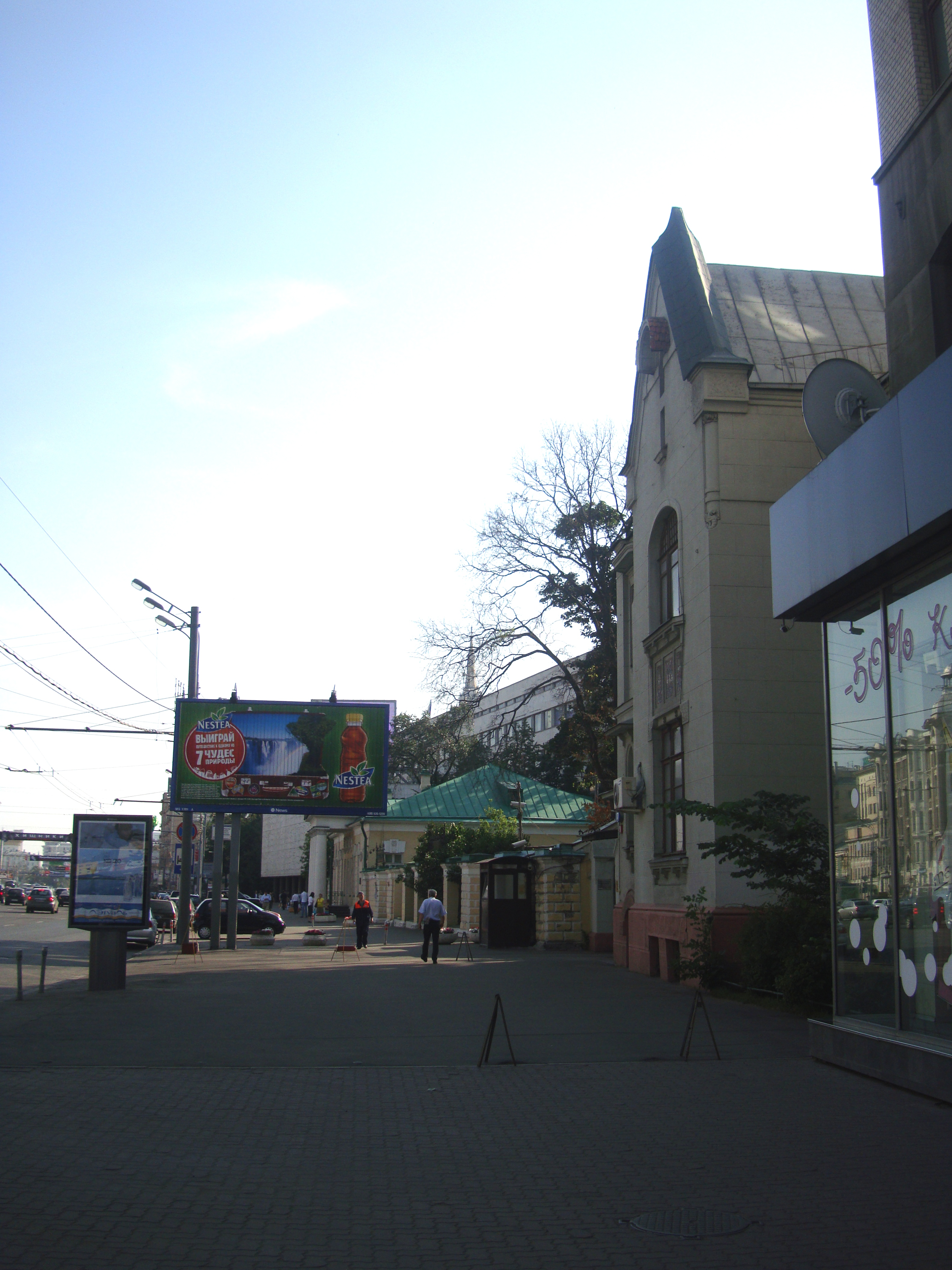
Embassy in Moscow

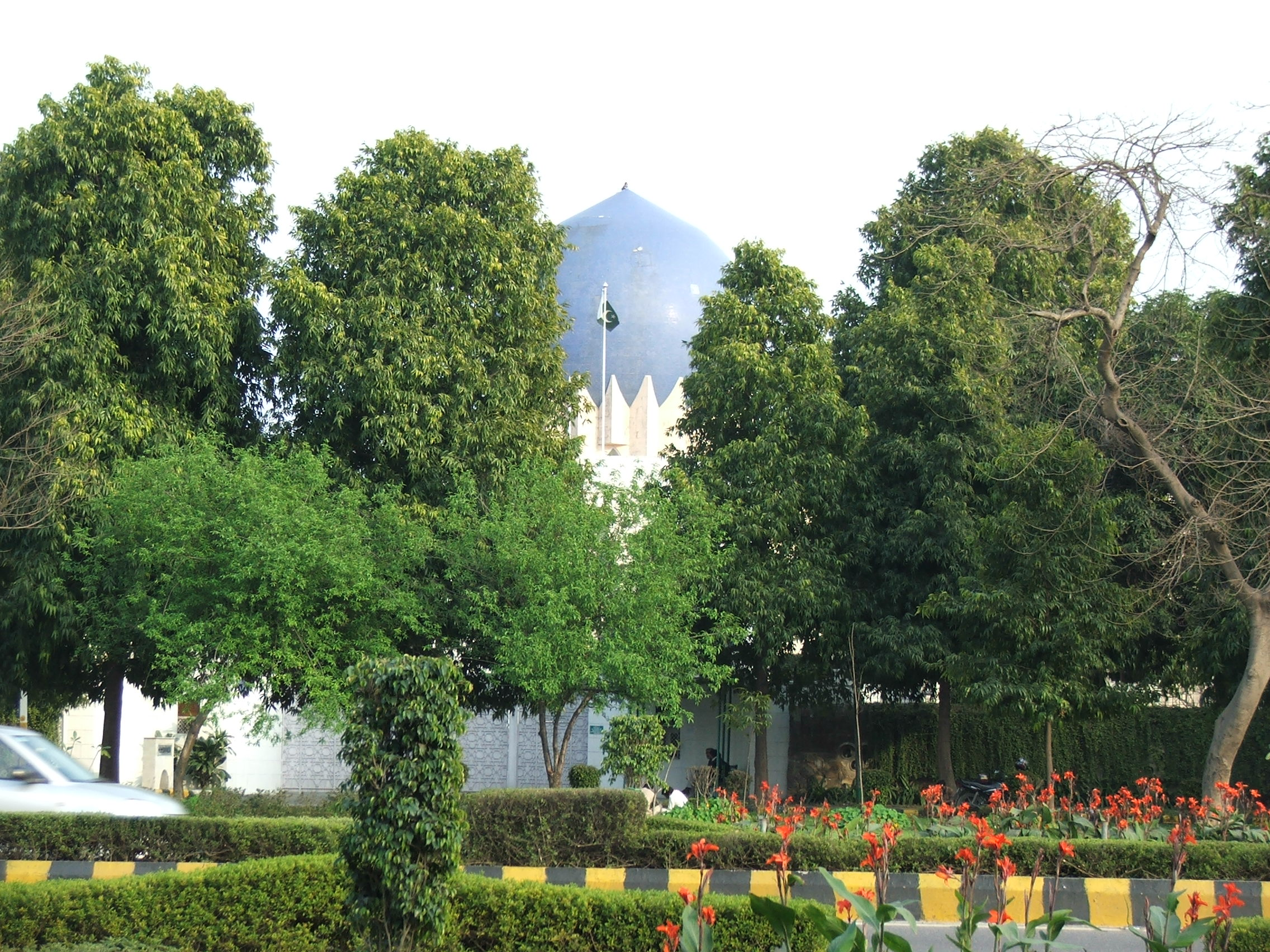
High Commission in New Delhi

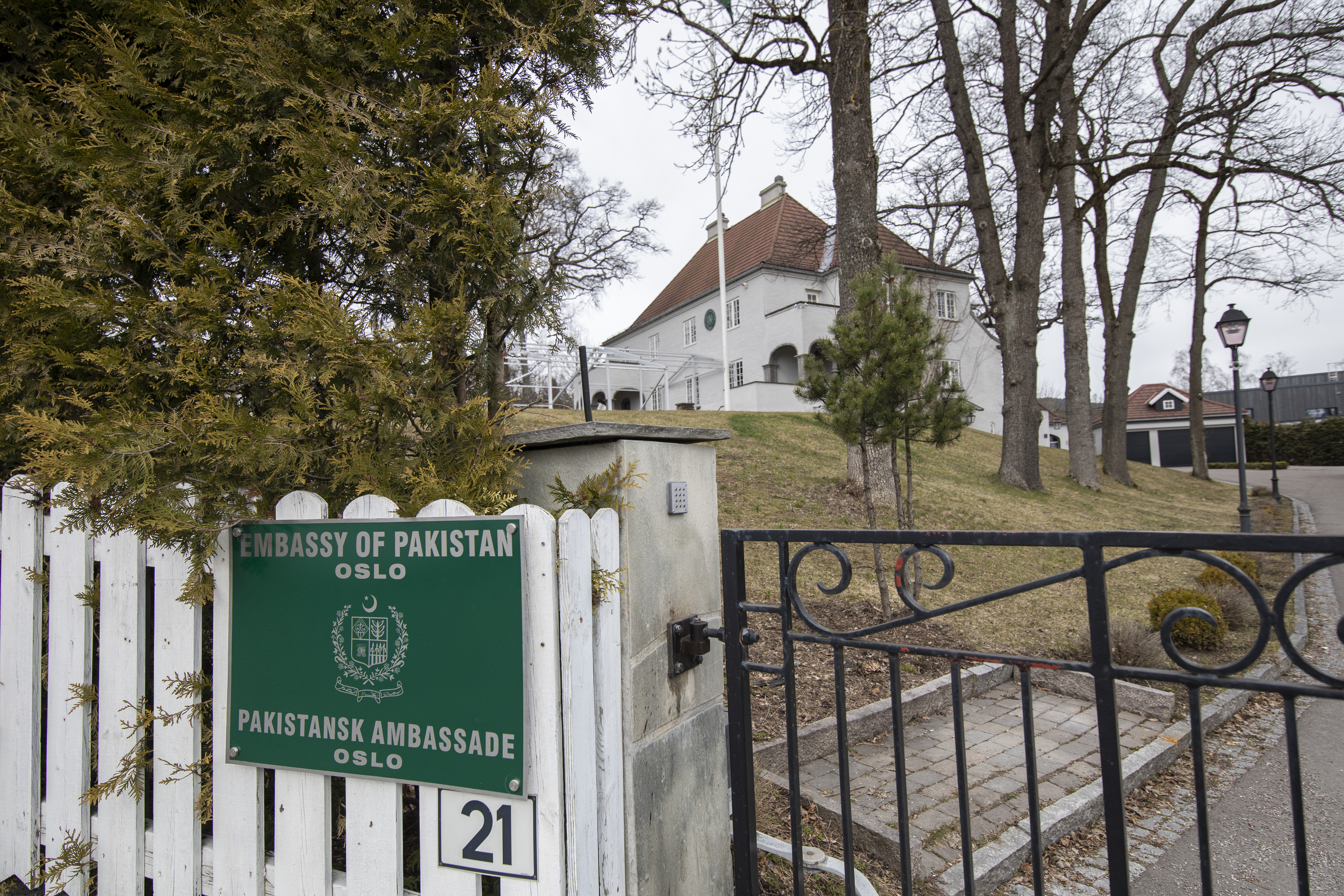
Embassy in Oslo

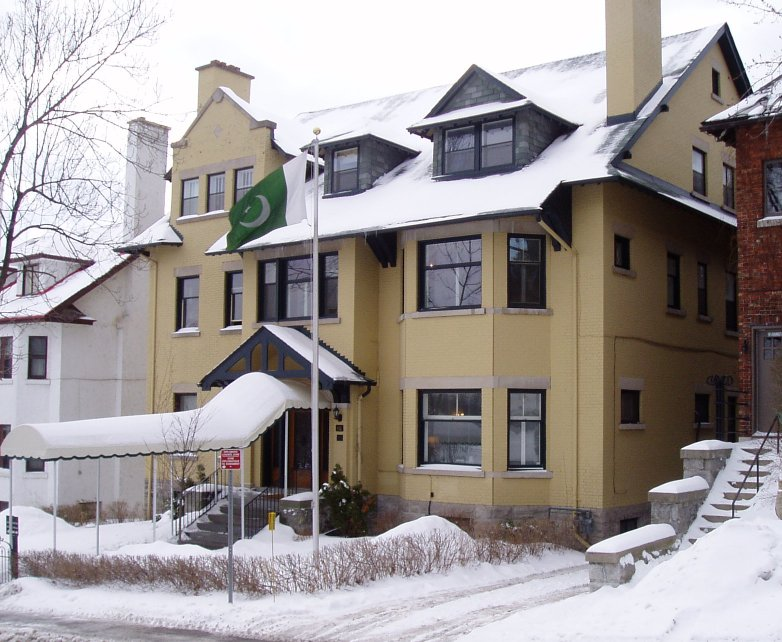
High Commission in Ottawa

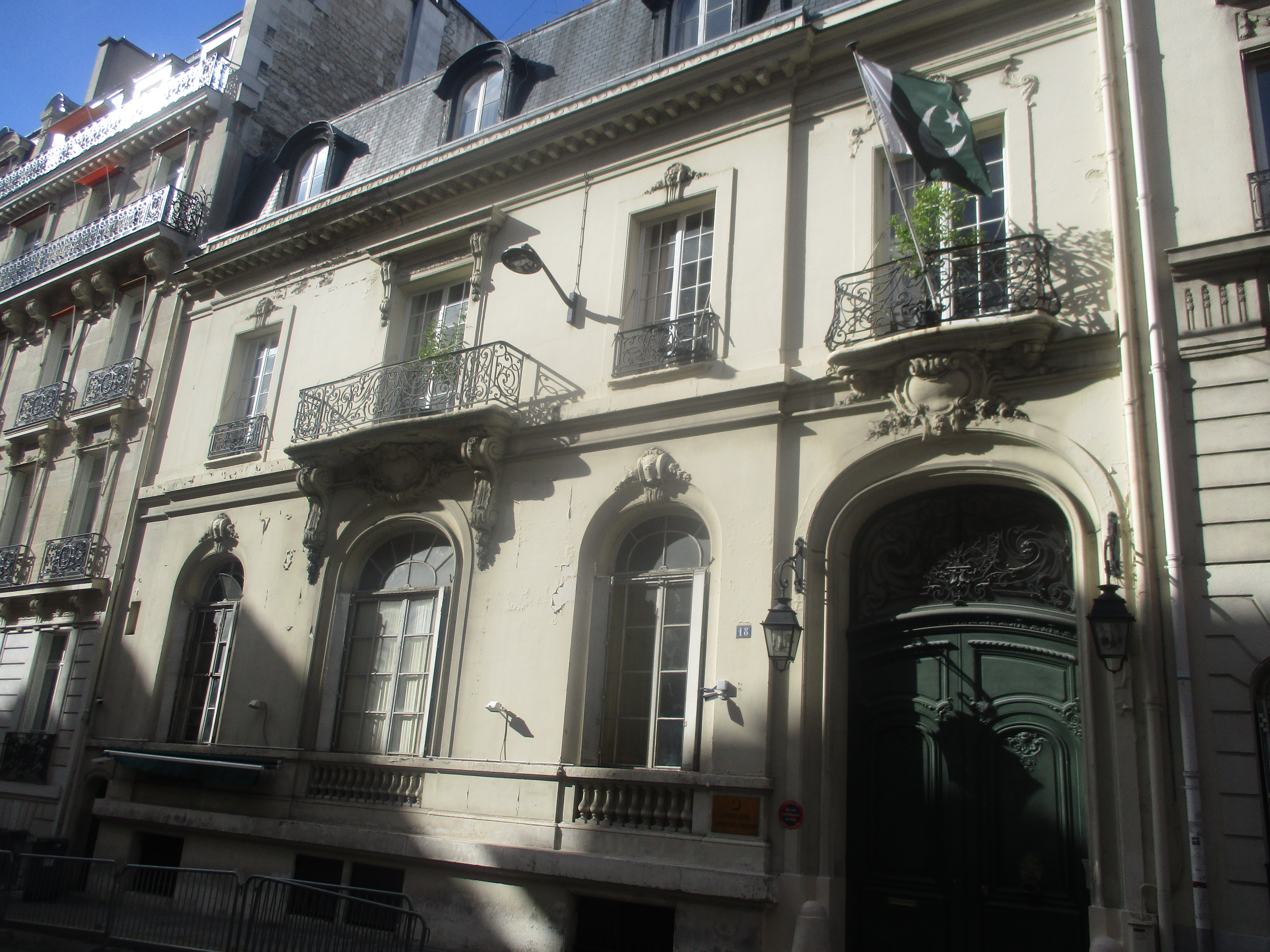
Embassy in Paris

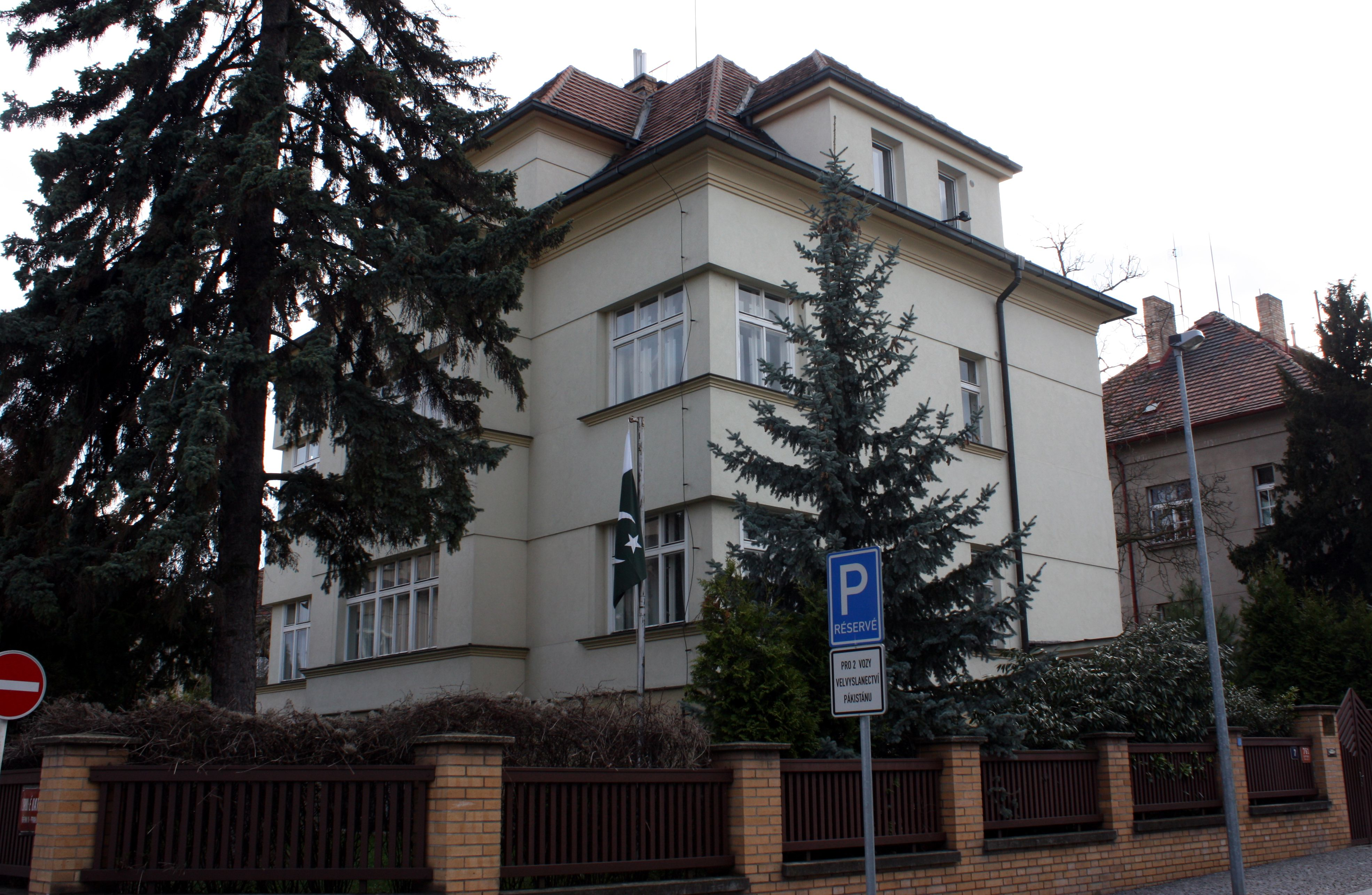
Embassy in Prague

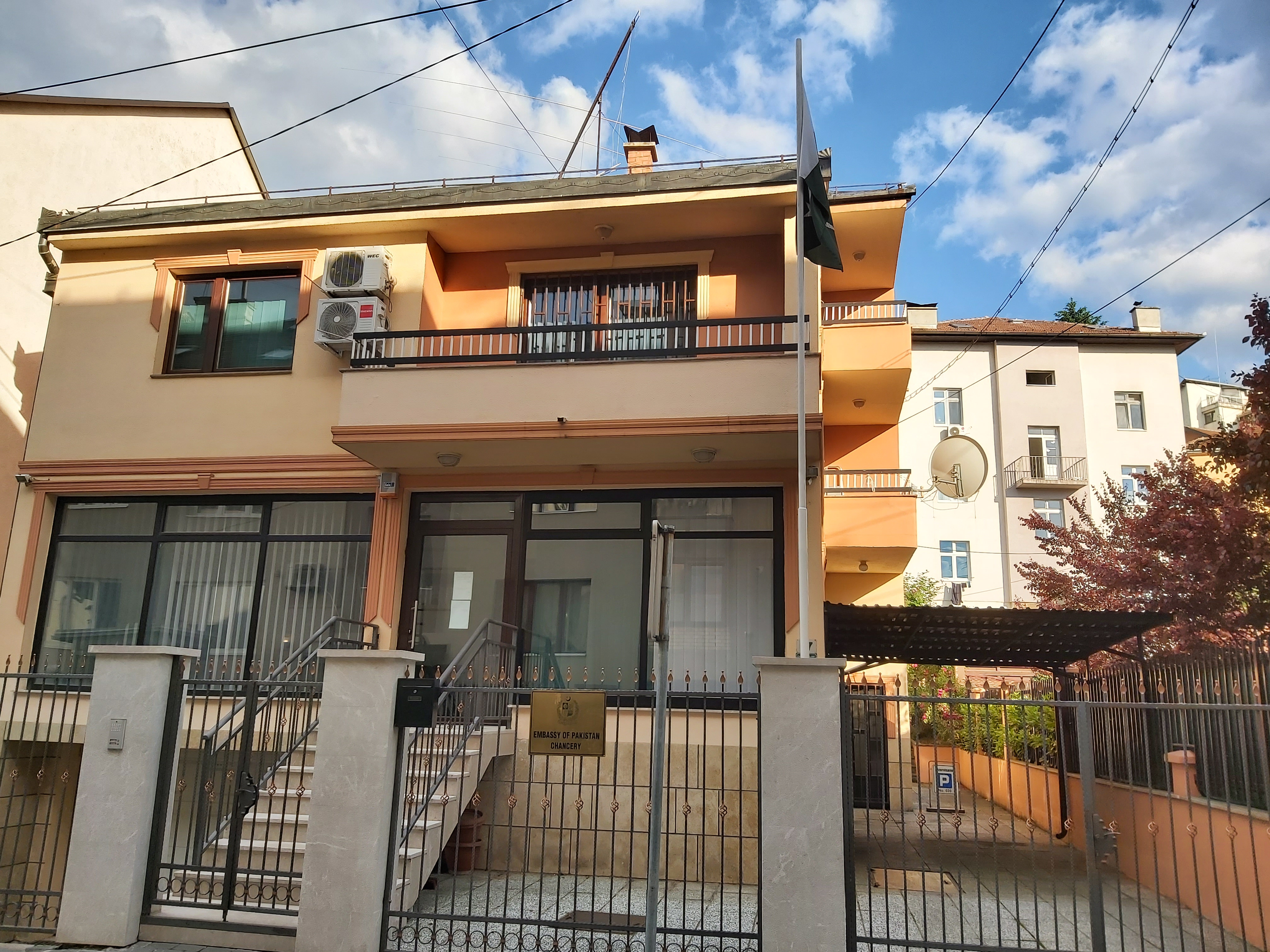
Embassy in Sarajevo

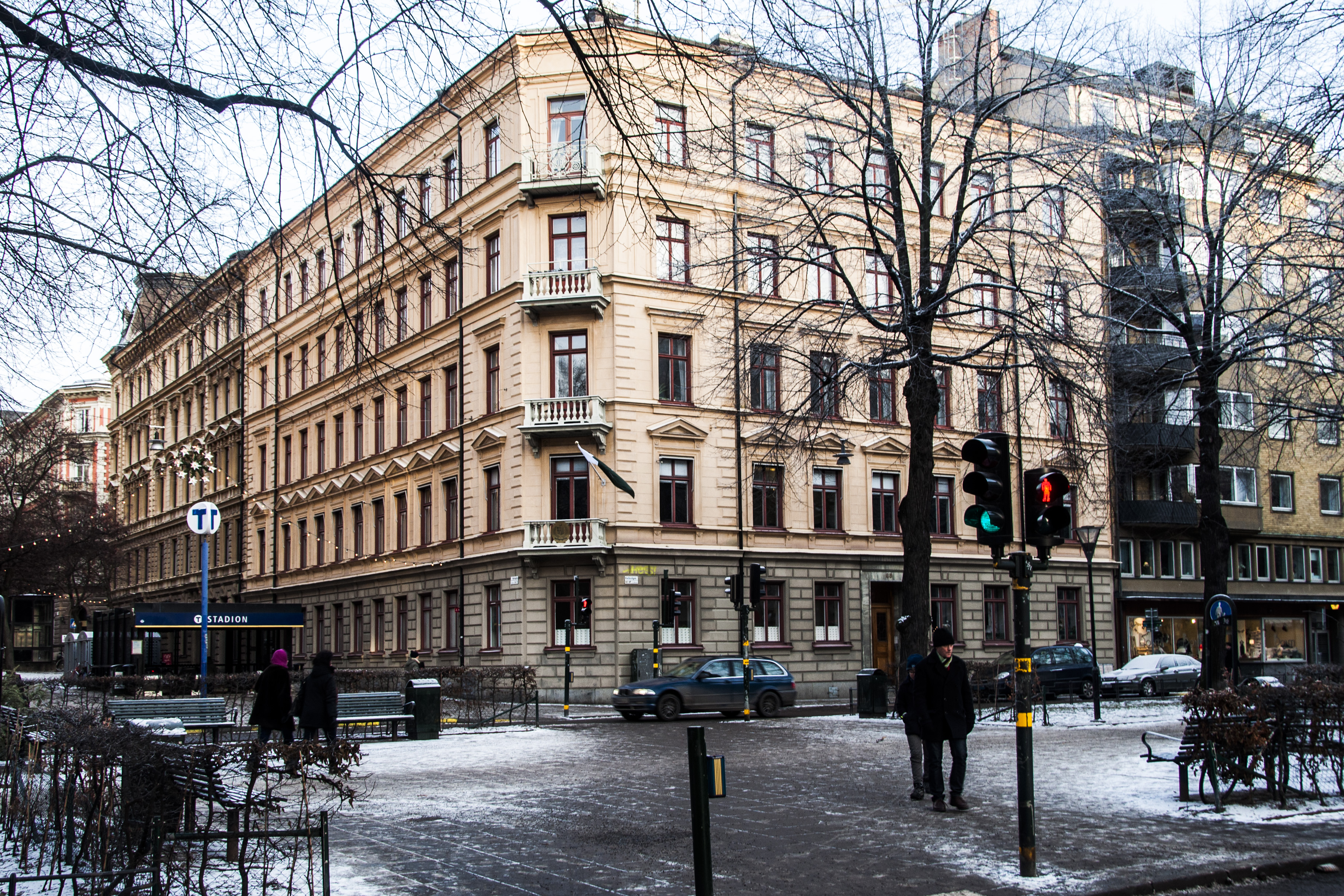
Embassy in Stockholm

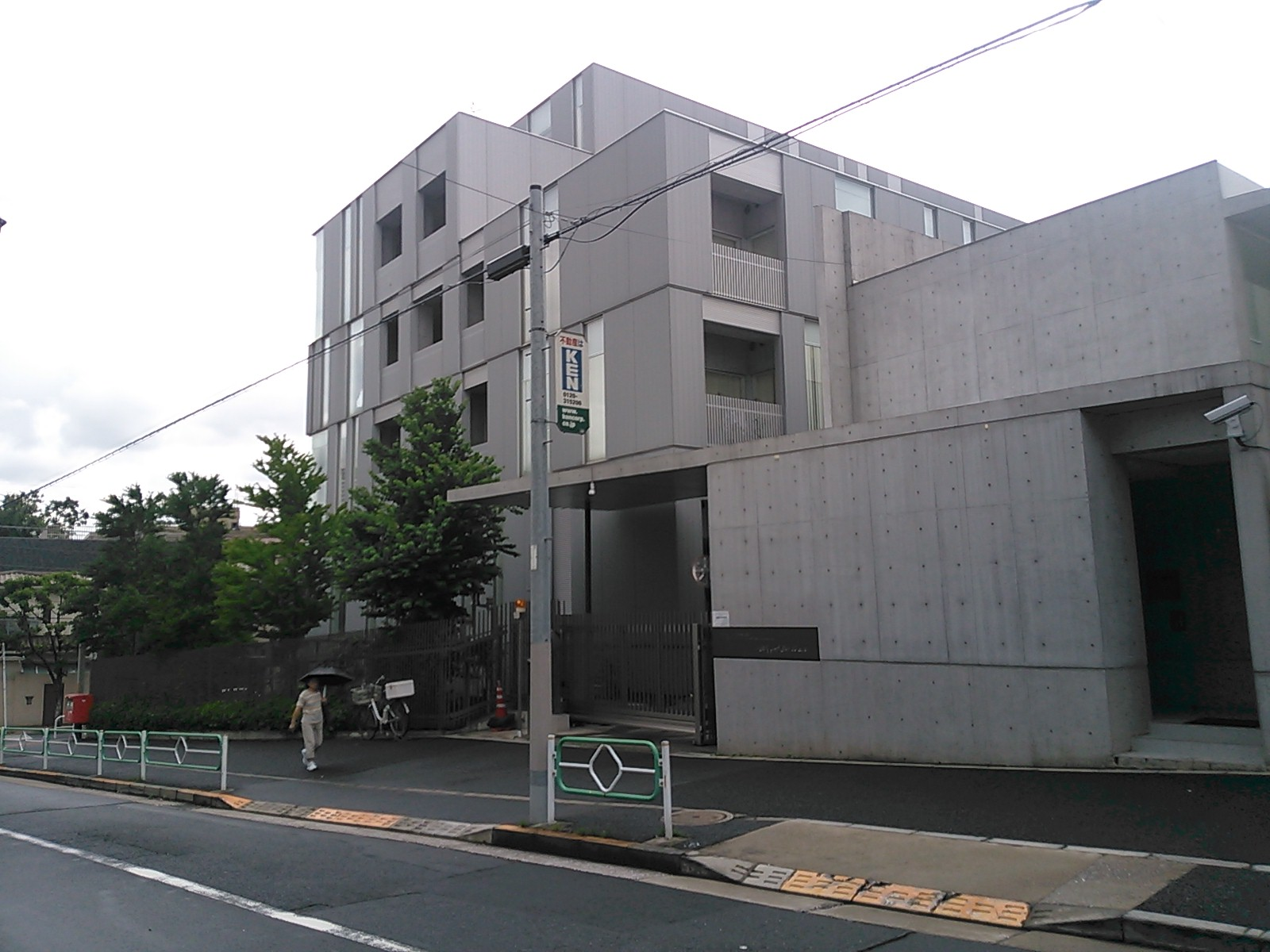
Embassy in Tokyo

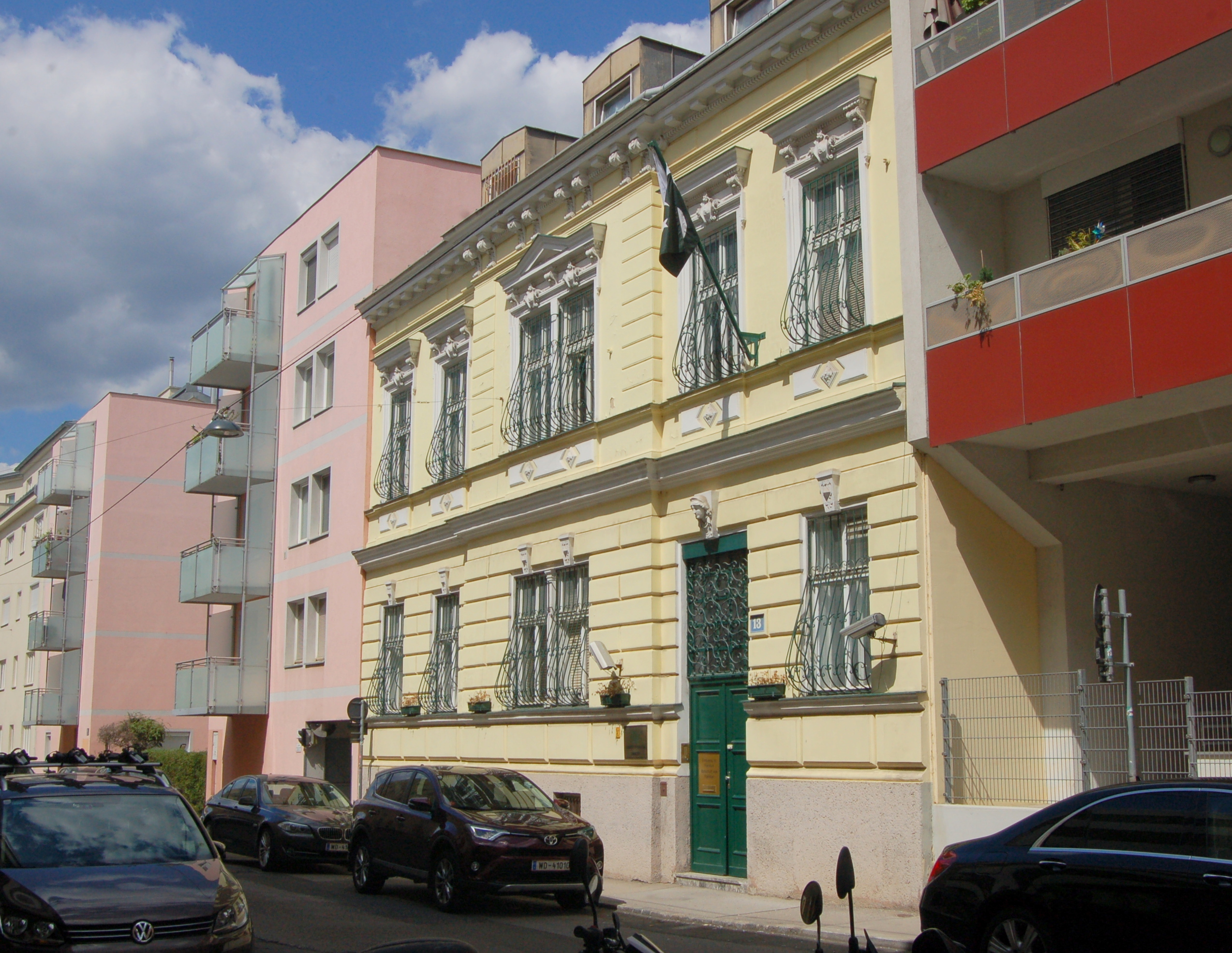
Embassy in Vienna

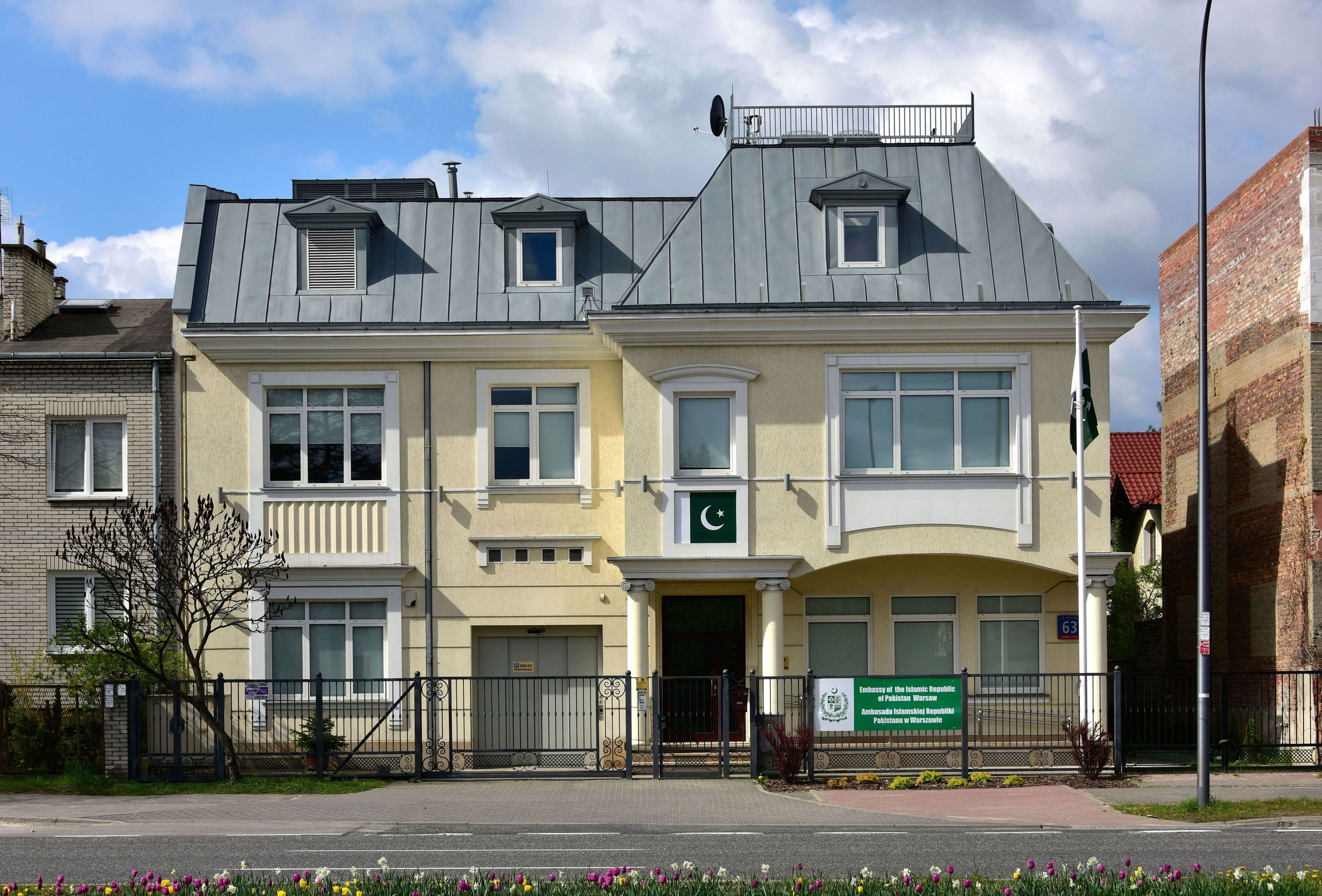
Embassy in Warsaw

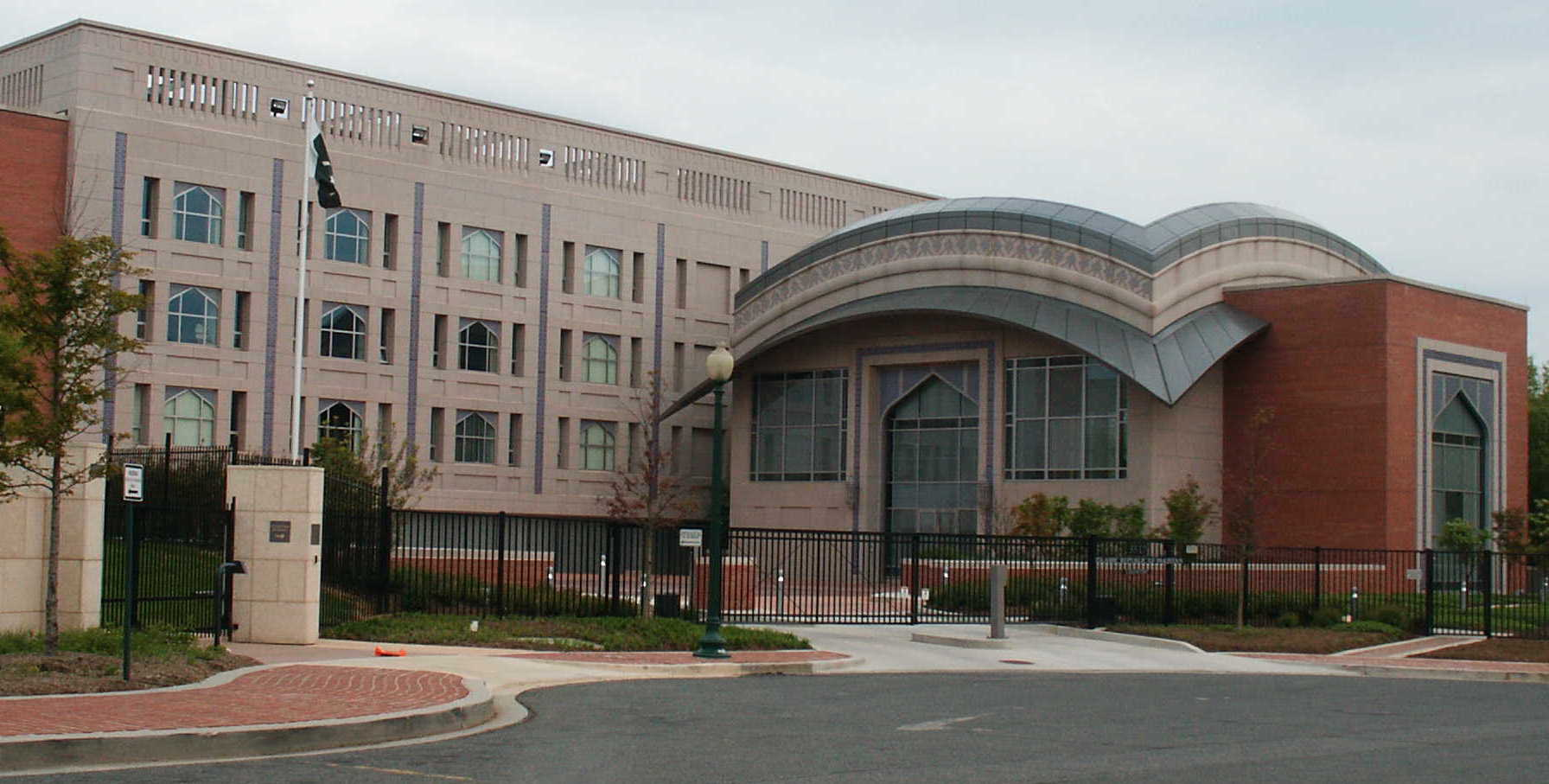
Embassy in Washington, D.C.

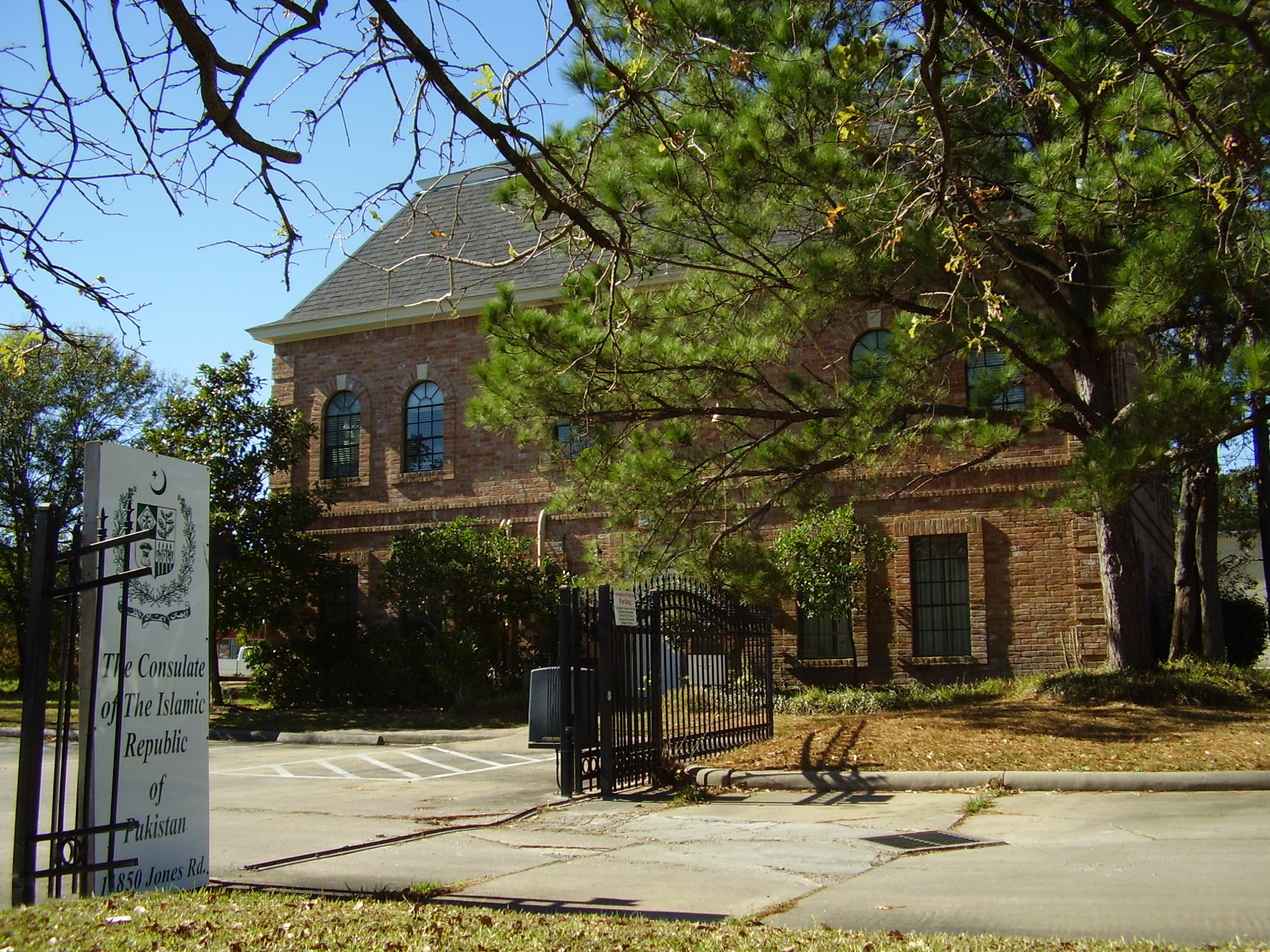
Consulate-General in Houston

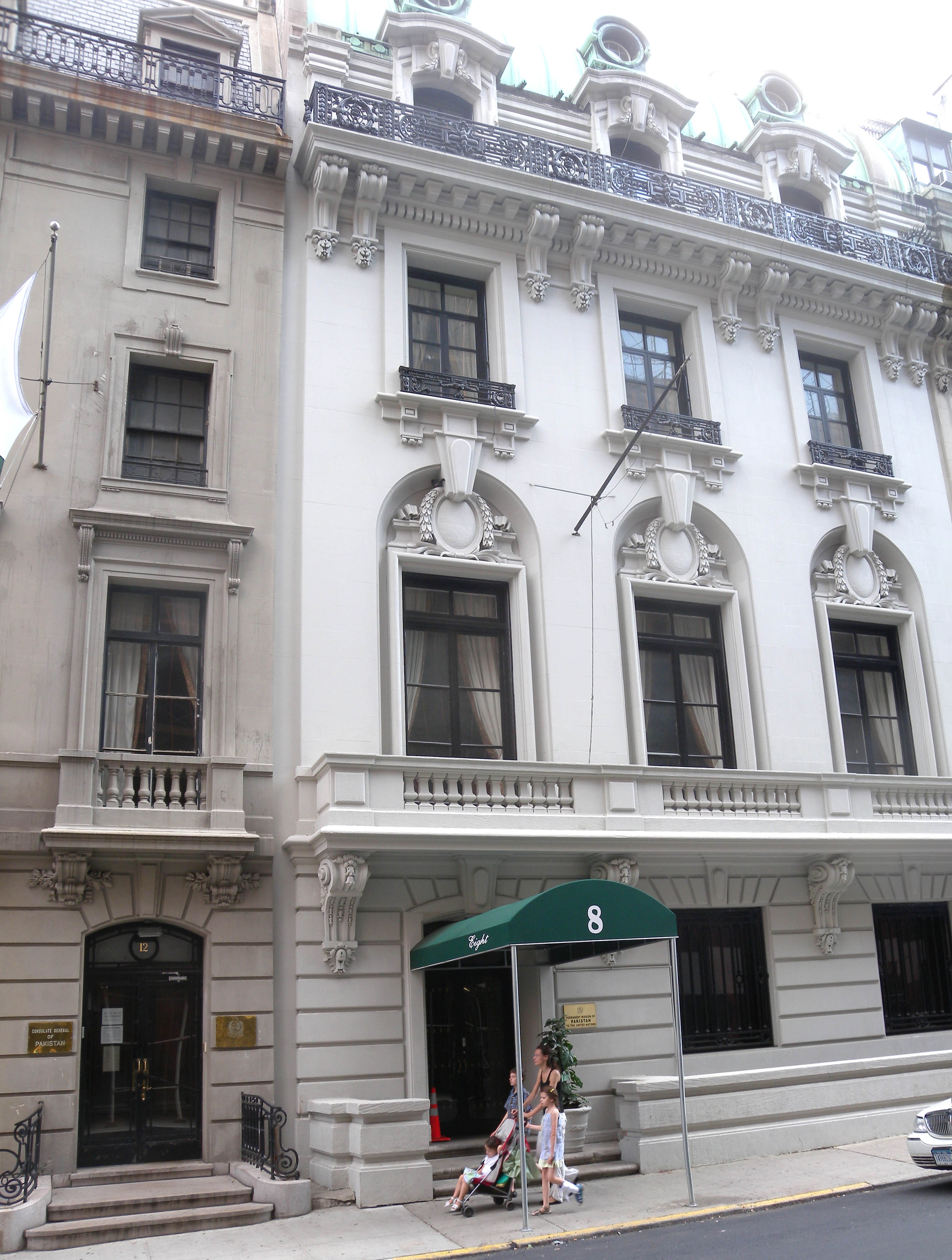
Consulate-General and Permanent Mission to the U.N. in New York City

== Closed missions ==
=== Africa ===
Host country	Host city	Mission	Year closed	Ref.
Somalia	Mogadishu	Embassy	Unknown	

=== Americas ===
Host country	Host city	Mission	Year closed	Ref.
Chile	Santiago de Chile	Embassy (Note: Resident in Buenos Aires, Argentina)	2014	

=== Asia ===
Host country	Host city	Mission	Year closed	Ref.
India	Mumbai	Consulate	1994	
North Korea	Pyongyang	Embassy	2021	
Yemen	Sana'a	Embassy	2015	

== See also ==
- List of diplomatic missions in Pakistan
- Foreign relations of Pakistan
- Diplomatic missions in Karachi
- Public diplomacy of Pakistan
