= Pakistan Association Dubai =

- Abbreviation: PAD
- Formation: 1960s
- Purpose: Community association
- Headquarters: P.O. Box. 426 Oud Metha Road, Street 11, Bur Dubai
- Location: Dubai, United Arab Emirates
- Members: Pakistani community
- President: Dr. Faisel Ikram
- Vice President: Muhammad Zaim
- General Secretary: Sohail Ashraf
- Website: pad.ae

The Pakistan Association Dubai (PAD) is the largest community center for overseas Pakistanis in the world. It was founded in the late 1960s as a platform for advancing the social and cultural interests of Pakistani expatriates residing in Dubai and more broadly, the United Arab Emirates.

== History ==
The Pakistani diaspora in the UAE is the third largest overseas Pakistani community, and also one of the oldest expatriate groups in the UAE. There are currently over 1.2 million Pakistanis in the United Arab Emirates, out of which over 400,000 are based in Dubai alone. Pakistanis collectively comprise around 13% of Dubai's population and are the third largest ethnic group in the emirate (after Indians and native Emiratis). When PAD was founded in the late 1960s by members of the early community, it was initially based at a small rented office space in Murshid Bazar in Deira, where the Pakistan Education Academy now exists. By the early 1990s, the office was shifted to the Astoria Hotel in Bur Dubai. Later, the centre where the association is now headquartered was built on Oud Metha Road in Bur Dubai. The objectives of PAD include promoting relations between Pakistan and the UAE, providing community support and welfare, promoting Pakistani culture, organising recreational community events, and enhancing the interests of the Pakistani expatriate community in the UAE.

== Structure ==
The association elects a president who formally heads the organisation, typically for a tenure of two to three years. A vice-president, general-secretary and joint-secretary are also elected as part of the executive body. Membership is required to register and participate in the association. PAD works closely with the Consulate-General of Pakistan in Dubai. There are multiple community wings operating under PAD. These include the medical, engineering, journalist, professional, accounting and ladies wings, among others.

== Events and activities ==
PAD arranges numerous cultural events and gatherings in the community, such as Independence Day, Pakistan Day and UAE National Day celebrations, literary events including mushairas, iftar dinners during Ramadan, chaand raat events, meena bazaars, fundraising dinners and awareness events, award ceremonies, art exhibitions, sport and leisurely events, as well as workshops and language classes. PAD also arranges support services for Pakistanis in the UAE labour force, as well welfare activities both in Pakistan and the UAE. A newsletter is published and distributed by the association.

== See also ==
- Consulate-General of Pakistan, Dubai
- Pakistanis in the United Arab Emirates
