= Pakistan–United Arab Emirates relations =

- Pakistan: United Arab Emirates

Diplomatic mission
- Embassy of Pakistan, Abu Dhabi: Embassy of the United Arab Emirates, Islamabad

Pakistan–United Arab Emirates relations refer to bilateral relations between the Islamic Republic of Pakistan and the United Arab Emirates. These relations date back to 1971. Both countries' populations are majorly Muslim and both are members of the Organization of Islamic Cooperation.

There is a significant Pakistani community that resides in the UAE. In 2017, over 1.5 million Pakistanis lived in the UAE.

== History ==
After the British residency in the Trucial States ended, Pakistan called for the UAE the successor of the Trucial States to include Bahrain and Qatar as states of the United Arab Emirates, this however never materialised and relations with the United Arab Emirates were established in 1971. The UAE's founding father and first president Sheikh Zayed bin Sultan Al Nahyan made multiple visits to Pakistan and considered it to be his second home.

In 1985, Pakistan International Airlines (PIA), helped Emirate of Dubai found its new airline, Emirates. PIA provided technical and administrative assistance to Emirates and leased two aircraft to the new company. As an acknowledgement of its contribution, Emirates selected Karachi as the first destination for its first flight.

Throughout history, multiple frequent exchanges of high level visits and regular bilateral consultations between the two countries continue to occur and are reflective of the fact that Pakistan and UAE have laid strong foundations of mutually beneficial relations, friendship and peaceful cooperation over the years. The UAE has emerged as one of Pakistan's major economic and trading partners. Many Pakistani expatriates, numbering nearly 1.2 million are gainfully employed in UAE. The Pakistani expatriates in UAE have contributed in a significant manner to promotion of bilateral understanding and to the economy of Pakistan through their home remittances. The relationship between the two has been dubbed as a special relationship. Pakistanis are the second largest group of foreign residents living in the country.

The UAE also has a long cricket relationship with Pakistan, serving as a home ground for the Pakistan cricket team for the past few decades.

In 2014, trade between the two countries was valued at $9 billion. In December 2019, the UAE deposited $3 billion in the State Bank of Pakistan to enhance the bank's liquidity and foreign currency reserves.

However, in recent years, the relationship has been somewhat complicated by the UAE and Pakistan expanding their ties with one another's regional rivals, Qatar and India respectively. The UAE has pledged support to Pakistan's Gwadar Port project, and is assisting in the construction of a desalination plant in the city. As of 2019, relations again began to improve substantially, with the UAE willing to invest $5 billion in Pakistan's Balochistan province, in order to build an oil refinery.

In 2015, Emirati minister Anwar Gargash criticized Pakistan’s decision not to militarily support the Saudi Arabian–led intervention in Yemen against the Houthis. According to Gargash the Pakistani parliament’s decision, while still voicing support for the coalition was “contradictory and dangerous and unexpected from Islamabad”. Pakistan argued its military was already deployed on the Afghanistan border and an additional war would be a challenge, especially one that was overseas. According to some authors, China may have pressured Pakistan to not join the war, fearing that Pakistan's involvement would bring it into a war with Iran and jeopardize Chinese investments in CPEC.

During the COVID-19 pandemic the UAE had started free testing of Pakistanis residing in the Emirates. On 5 May 2020, the authorities of Pakistan raised an issue regarding the repatriation of their citizens from the United Arab Emirates during the COVID-19 pandemic. Reuters reported that according to Pakistani officials, the Pakistani workers returning from the Gulf nation had high number of COVID-19 patients. The ministry spokeswoman, Aisha Farooqui highlighted that the situation was officially addressed to the UAE authorities, where the virus was believed to be spreading due to the crowded living conditions in the Emirates. The Pakistani envoy in the UAE refuted the media reports on the high number of Pakistanis being repatriated while being infected, calling them "exaggerated". The UAE Foreign Ministry stated "Everyone on UAE repatriation flights has been tested before departure, and those found to be infected were not allowed to travel."

In 2026, the relationship between the two countries deterioriated over Pakistan's position on the 2026 Iran War. In April, the Emirates recalled a $3.5 billion loan to Pakistan, nearly a fifth or roughly 21 per cent of Pakistan’s foreign reserves at the time. The move put pressure on Pakistani economy and also impacted its minimum foreign reserves requirement amid an active IMF program. Pakistani workers in the UAE too were reportedly expelled en masse. While Pakistan Foreign Ministry's spokesperson claimed that the deportees were criminals, reports indicated that Pakistani shiites were the ones that were deported although the same treatment was not meted out to the Shias from other countries like Iraq. An Islamabad-based cleric claimed that there were 5,000 deported families.

== UAE Pakistan Assistance Program ==
On 12 January 2011, the UAE Pakistan Assistance Program (UAE-PAP) was launched in order to help and provide assistance to Pakistan and mitigate the impact of floods by redeveloping infrastructure, as per the directives of Sheikh Khalifa Bin Zayed Al Nahyan, the second President of the United Arab Emirates. The UAE PAP developed a comprehensive redevelopment plan based on four main areas of social redevelopment that includes health, education, water and infrastructure. The Program assisted the people of Swat district as it provided for the construction of two bridges, 52 schools and 7 hospitals, as well as the initiation of 64 water supply schemes.

The program aims to support efforts in fighting poverty, develop education, advance healthcare services, and contribute to the creation of new job opportunities for Pakistanis. Under the program, a number of projects such as infrastructure, education, healthcare and access to drinking water have been launched. As of October 2019, more than 30,000 Pakistani students have been enrolled in Schools built by the UAE-PAP in Swat District.

In May 2018, the UAE channeled $200 million into the UAE-PAP.

The UAE has also orchestrated multiple campaigns to eradicate polio in Pakistan. Since 2014, more than hundreds of millions of polio vaccine were delivered to around 71 million children in Pakistan.

As a result of the UAE funding projects in Pakistan, multiple institutions, bridges, airports and hospitals in Pakistan are named after the UAE's founding father and first president, Sheikh Zayed bin Sultan Al Nahyan, such as the Sheikh Zayed Bridge in Swat Valley and Sheikh Zayed Medical Complex in Lahore.

== Military relations ==
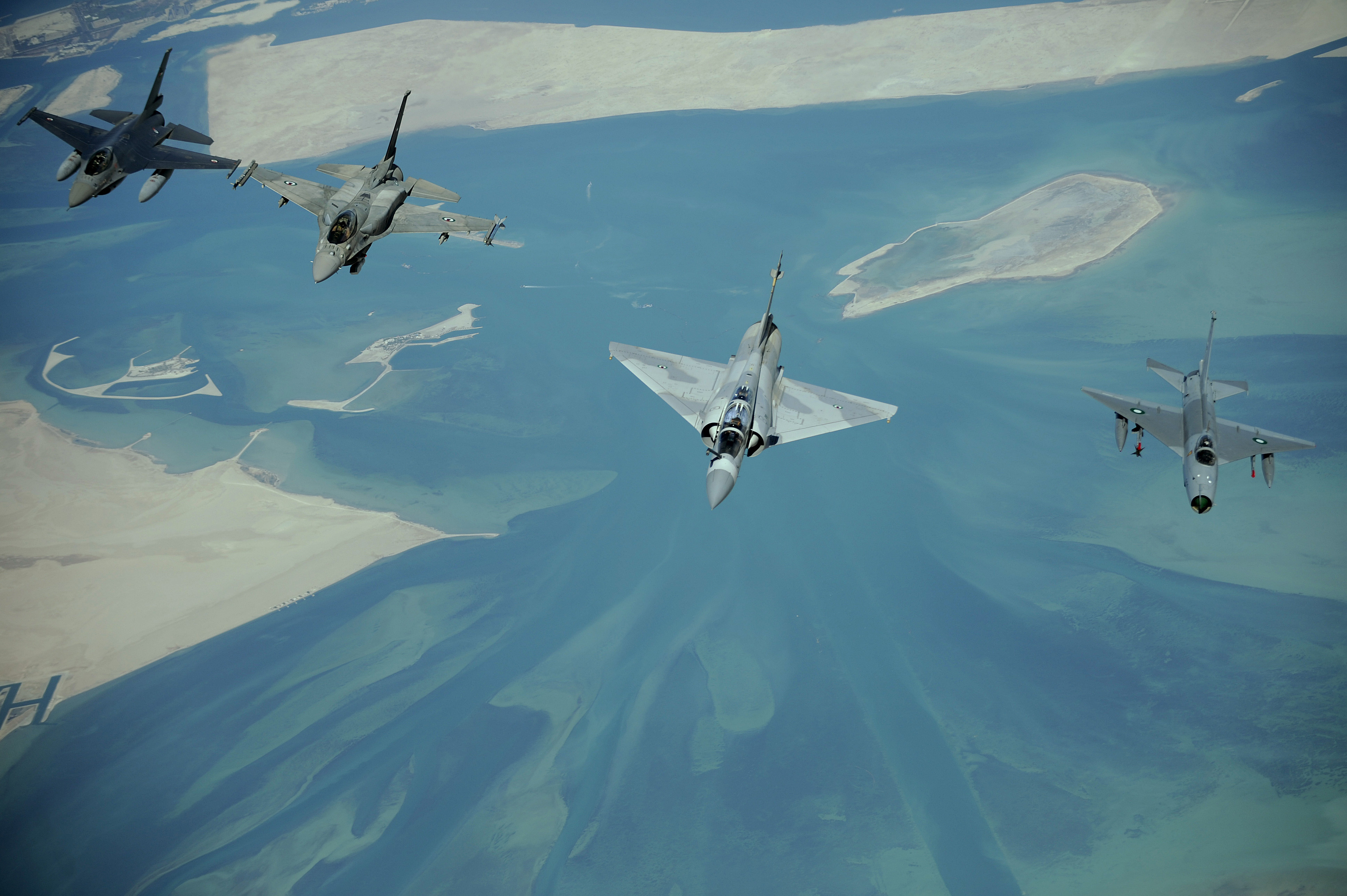
Emirati F-16's, an Emirati Mirage 2000, and a Pakistani F-7, left to right, fly in formation during a multinational exercise, Dec. 9, 2009.

Defence relations between Pakistan and the UAE began shortly before the UAE's formation in 1971. Pakistani troops imparted training to members of the Abu Dhabi defence forces as far back as 1968, upon the request of the founder of the UAE Sheikh Zayed, as the British were about to hand over command of the Gulf Trucial States. A protocol was signed in the mid-1970s, and defence cooperation continued for the succeeding decades. Both countries share geographical proximity and a longstanding history of bilateral relations. The Pakistan Army established an armour training school in the UAE, and provided training to UAE commando battalions, as well as all armed and artillery corps officers. Pakistani personnel also held prominent positions as advisers and trainers in the UAE Air Force (UAEAF). During the mid-1970s, more than 50% of UAEAF pilots were Pakistanis. The UAEAF is dubbed by Pakistani author Shahid Amin to have been "an extension of the Pakistan Air Force" at one point. The first Chief of Air Staff of the UAE, appointed by Sheikh Zayed, was Air Cdre Ayaz Ahmed Khan, followed by Ghulam Haider, Jamal A. Khan and Feroz A. Khan, all of whom were Pakistan Air Force (PAF) officers. In total, the first five Chiefs of Air Staff of the UAE Air Force were Pakistanis. The succeeding commanders were native officers, although group captain ranked officers of the PAF continued serving as Deputy Chief of Air Staff. As of 2004, the UAEAF had around 55 Pakistani flying instructors, and there were a few number of Pakistani personnel serving in the UAE Army and Navy. Officers of the Pakistan Navy have served in the UAE while training the local naval force. Pakistan General Ahmad Shuja Pasha became a security advisor to the UAE government upon his retirement from the Pakistani secret service. Inside Pakistan the UAE has a lease for use of Shamsi Airfield located in Pakistan's Balochistan province.

UAE supported the US's decision to sell F-16 aircraft to Pakistan to strengthen Pakistani airforce, saying the sale would not alter the balance of strength between India and Pakistan.

== Resident diplomatic missions ==
- Pakistan has an embassy in Abu Dhabi and a consulate-general in Dubai.
- the United Arab Emirates has an embassy in Islamabad and a consulate-general in Karachi.

== See also ==
- Foreign relations of Pakistan
- Foreign relations of the United Arab Emirates
- Pakistanis in the United Arab Emirates
