= List of diplomatic missions in Dubai =

This is a list of diplomatic missions in Dubai. There are 90 consulates and other missions in the city.

== Consular missions ==
All consular missions are Consulate General, unless otherwise noted:

1. Afghanistan
2. Angola (Consulate)
3. Armenia
4. Australia
5. Azerbaijan
6. Bahrain
7. Bangladesh
8. Belarus
9. Benin
10. Bulgaria
11. Burundi
12. Cameroon
13. Canada
14. Central African Republic
15. Chad
16. China
17. Comoros
18. Cote D'Ivoire
19. Croatia
20. Denmark
21. Djibouti
22. Egypt
23. Equatorial Guinea
24. Eritrea
25. Ethiopia
26. Fiji
27. France
28. Germany
29. Ghana
30. Grenada
31. India
32. Indonesia
33. Iran
34. Iraq
35. Israel
36. Italy
37. Japan
38. Jordan
39. Kazakhstan
40. Kenya
41. Kuwait
42. Kyrgyzstan
43. Lebanon
44. Liberia
45. Libya
46. Malawi
47. Malaysia
48. Malta
49. Mauritius
50. Morocco
51. Mozambique
52. Myanmar
53. Nepal
54. Netherlands
55. New Zealand
56. Niger
57. Nigeria
58. Norway
59. Pakistan
60. Palestine
61. Panama
62. Peru
63. Philippines
64. Qatar
65. Romania
66. Russia
67. Rwanda
68. Saint Kitts and Nevis
69. Saudi Arabia
70. Singapore
71. Somalia
72. South Africa
73. South Korea
74. South Sudan
75. Sri Lanka
76. Switzerland
77. Syria
78. Tajikistan
79. Tanzania
80. Thailand
81. Tunisia
82. Turkey
83. Turkmenistan
84. Uganda
85. Ukraine
86. United Kingdom (Embassy)
87. United States
88. Uzbekistan
89. Vanuatu
90. Yemen
91. Zambia
92. Zimbabwe

== Other missions ==
1. Catalonia (Catalonia Trade & Investment's office in Dubai)
2. Chile (Commercial Office)
3. Greece (Economic & Commercial Affairs Office)
4. Hong Kong (Economic and Trade Office)
5. Ireland (Economic Office)
6. Portugal (Portuguese Trade Center)
7. Republic of China (Taiwan) (Commercial Office)
8. Spain (Economic and Commercial Office)

== See also ==
- List of diplomatic missions in the United Arab Emirates
