= Embassy of Pakistan, Abu Dhabi =

Diplomatic mission of Representation

Embassy of Pakistan, Abu Dhabi
- Location: Abu Dhabi, United Arab Emirates
- Address: Plot No. 2, Sector W59, P.O Box. 846, Diplomatic Area
- Coordinates: 24.424°N 54.432°E
- Ambassador: Afzaal Mahmood
- Jurisdiction: Abu Dhabi
- Website: Embassy of Pakistan, Abu Dhabi

The Embassy of Pakistan, Abu Dhabi is the diplomatic mission representing Pakistan in the United Arab Emirates. The embassy is located in the Diplomatic Area in Abu Dhabi. Faisal Niaz Tirmizi is the incumbent Ambassador of Pakistan to the United Arab Emirates. Pakistan also has a Consulate-General in Dubai, which works under the embassy.

The Embassy provides various Consular services including Machine Readable Passports (MRP), NADRA ID cards, Visa, Attestation in addition to various Community Welfare Services. On average around 500 to 700 people visit the Embassy daily for various services.

== History ==
The Embassy facilitated the repatriation of around 24,000 Pakistanis during the COVID-19 pandemic and around 60,000 Pakistanis in total if repatriations from Dubai are included, making it one of the largest international evacuation operations in the history of Pakistan.

== See also ==
- Pakistan–United Arab Emirates relations
- List of diplomatic missions of Pakistan
- List of diplomatic missions in the United Arab Emirates
