= German-Pakistani =

German-Pakistani or Pakistani-German (also unhyphenated) may refer to:

- As an adjective, anything relating to Germany–Pakistan relations
- Pakistanis in Germany
- Germans in Pakistan
