= Italian Pakistani =

Italian Pakistani or Pakistani Italian may refer to:

- Italy-Pakistan relations (c.f. "an Italian-Pakistani treaty")
- Pakistanis in Italy
- Italians in Pakistan
- Mixed race people of Italian and Pakistani descent in any country
- Multiple citizenship of both Italy and Pakistan
