= Libya–Pakistan relations =

- Pakistan: Libya

The Libya–Pakistan relations are the international and bilateral relations between Libya and Pakistan. The relations remain friendly and bonded throughout its history as both countries share similar religious identities, and cultural links, particularly their Islamic heritage. The bilateral relations were established in the 1950s when King Idris agreed to provide financial aid to the then-impoverished Pakistan.

== History of foreign relations ==
=== Relations during Cold war ===
==== 1960s–70s: OIC conference in Lahore ====
After staging a coup d'état against King Idris of Libya in 1969, Muammar Gaddafi grew his relations with the Marxist circle of Pakistan. At the height of the war with India in 1971, Libyan leader Gaddafi personally directed a strongly worded letter to Indian Prime Minister Indira Gandhi, accusing her of aggression against Pakistan in 1971, which endeared him to all Pakistanis.

The foreign relations of Libya and Pakistan began to grow in the 1970s when the Pakistani populace began to notice Gaddafi who paid his first state visit to Pakistan to attend the Organisation of the Islamic Conference (OIC) held in Lahore, in 1974. In a televised speech at the OIC meeting, Gaddafi declared his support for Pakistan to pursue the nuclear technology, an issue which had been made a hot-topic by the United States. When he came to Pakistan to attend the second Islamic Summit Conference in 1974, he stated, "Pakistan is the fort of Islam."

On Pakistan's Left-wing sphere specifically the Pakistan Peoples Party (PPP), Gaddafi was respectable and a popular figure who had many inter-personal relations with Pakistan's Marxist circle. According to the American political correspondent, the Time, Gaddafi was one of many financial supporter of Pakistan's clandestine atomic deterrence projects. Prime Minister Zulfikar Ali Bhutto had named the Gaddafi cricket stadium in Lahore, the largest in the country, after him. At many instance of Gaddafi, Bhutto decided to delegate Libya in its efforts to build its nuclear program, roughly based on Pakistan's motivation.

The general elections held in 1977 saw the overwhelming victory of Left-wing sphere. At an instance of rightist alliance, PNA, a violent civil disobedience movement led the successful imposition of martial law, under codename: Operation Fair Play, at midnight on 4 July 1977. This martial law led by Chief of Army Staff General Muhammad Zia-ul-Haq immediately removed the Marxist influence in the government. Periodically, all ties built with the Gaddafi was limited in 1977; eventually cutting off all ties and military assistance with Libya in 1978.

==== 1980s–90s: Reluctance, rift, and downfall ====
Before the atomic quest was completed, the Libyan delegation to participate in nuclear projects was sent back to Libya in 1978 and all military advisers of Pakistan Armed Forces were immediately called back to Pakistan in 1979. Such initiatives revealed that President General Zia had strongly hated and distrusted Gaddafi, therefore he immediately cut all the military aid to Libya. Gaddafi sent many appeals of clemency to spare Zulfikar Ali Bhutto's life and sent his personal plane with dispatching his Prime Minister, Abdessalam Jalloud, to fly Bhutto out from Pakistan. In spite of Gaddafi's initiatives, the air transport was sent back to Tripoli and after a week, Zulfikar Bhutto was hanged per the orders of the Supreme Court.

After learning the incident, Gaddafi lashed out at President Zia and began hosting as well as providing military training to far-left terrorist organization, the Al-Zulfiqar, which was established by Bhutto's children. However, the plan was thwarted by the ISI in 1980 when it had discovered and placed a mole in the Libyan embassy. In retaliation, Gaddafi signed a secret decree which called for the expulsion of all the 150,000 Pakistanis residing in Libya. The children and wife of Bhutto were given asylum by Gaddafi in the 1980s, despite the agitation of President Zia.

During this time, Libya suspected attempted to make a deal to share knowledge of nuclear projects with senior scientists working in atomic deterrence projects; all efforts were thwarted by ISI. In 1983–85, Libya restored its ties with India and acceded with a nuclear treaty with India as opposed to Pakistan.

=== Relations after Cold war ===
==== 1990s–2000s: Normalizing relations ====
After President Zia's death and state funeral, the foreign relations began to normalized. The general elections held in 1988 resulted in left-wing coming to power and appointing Benazir Bhutto as Pakistan's first female Prime minister. The ties continued until Prime Minister Benazir Bhutto was removed from power after amid corruption charges by President Ghulam Ishaq, in 1990.

In 1990, the new general elections oversaw the conservatives coming to power under Nawaz Sharif, for the first time in the history through a democratic transition. Immediately after being sworn in as the Prime Minister, Nawaz Sharif soon paid a state visit to Libya. In 1991, Sharif visit and met with Gaddafi. During the meeting, Gaddafi demanded Sharif to sell him a nuclear bomb as Gaddafi suspected that Pakistan had developed years later. Whilst, Prime Minister Sharif reputedly denying his request and urging Gaddafi to continue the economical relations with Pakistan. Gaddafi insulted the Sharif and labeled him as a "corrupt politician", which dismayed the Pakistan delegation. The Prime minister's delegation members and journalists were initially shocked and troubled with Gaddafi's attitude. Therefore, Sharif cancelled the talks and immediately returning to Pakistan and soon expelled Libyan Ambassador. The ties were again restored in 1993 following the resignation of conservative Prime Minister Nawaz Sharif and President Ghulam Ishaq. The new general elections in 1993 revived the comeback of PPP under Benazir Bhutto who was immediately sworn in as Prime Minister.

In 1994–95, there were reports indicated that the nuclear information was given to Gaddafi to provide aid in Libyan nuclear program. In 2001, Pakistan via ISI, passed intelligence about Gulf States and the nuclear ambitions of Iran and Libya, whose programs Pakistani scientists had helped to build. Pakistan began providing details of Libyan nuclear programme to Israel's Mossad. These evidence were made public by the United States but concealed the names of sources.

This is my second visit to Libya. I came once before with my (martyr) wife Benazir Bhutto and our family ties with Gaddafi family are strong...

— President Asif Ali Zardari's state visit to Libya, 2009

In 2003, Gaddafi announced his intention to rolling back the nuclear program and ultimately handed over the information given by the various sources to IAEA. This turned out to be a "political nightmare" for Pakistan when Gaddafi turned over the centrifuge designs to the IAEA in return for legitimacy causing Pakistan international isolation. President Pervez Musharraf and Prime Minister Shaukat Aziz's foreign expertise later helped Pakistan out of international isolation in 2004 due to the quick economic boom.

The PPP made its notable comeback during the general elections held in 2008. The PPP restarted its relations with Gaddafi, which paved way for President Asif Ali Zardari's state visit to Libya in 2009. During his visit, President Zardari termed Libya as his "second home".

==== 2010s–Present: Libyan Civil War ====
After the start of the civil war in Libya, Pakistan immediately adopted the policy of "non-belligerent" in 2011. In February 2011, following the protests in other Arab countries, widespread riots broke out against Gaddafi's 42-year rule resulting in loss of government control over most of eastern Libya.

In a press conference on 3 March 2011, the Foreign ministry of Pakistan spokesperson stated: "As far as the internal political situation of Libya is concerned, the Government of Pakistan would not like to offer any comment at this point in time". She stated that the current focus of the Pakistani government is on the safe repatriation of Pakistanis in Libya.

Defending his crackdown against the revolt during a lengthy speech, Gaddafi passed controversial remarks about the current situation of Pakistan. He also compared his crackdown to India's counterinsurgency in Indian-held Kashmir. Pakistan's Media did not welcome Gaddafi's speech, and Pakistan's Television channels heavily criticized Gaddafi's remarks, and accused Gaddafi of interfering in Pakistan's matters. During the civil war in Libya, the Pakistan Government initiated a cross-border operations, involving the Navy and the PAF to assure the safety of and safe evacuation of Pakistani community in Libya. During the same time, the Arab media circulated news reports alleging involvement of Pakistan military in the events of civil war in Libya, the Foreign Office emphatically stated that these were mischievous and totally baseless. There are no presence of any Pakistan military contingent forces in Libya.

During the Abu Salim Prison massacre remembrance, the Pakistan Embassy in Tripoli was attacked and bombed by the unknown Libyan terror group. No group claimed the responsibility of the act.

=== Economic and trade relations ===
Pakistan received economic assistance from Libya in the 1970s, aiding in the country's recovery after the Indo-Pakistani War of 1971. More recently, Libya has provided assistance to Pakistan to fight against floods, infections, disease, and other natural calamities in Pakistan.

In 1976, The Libyan Central Bank provided a loan of US$50 million to the Habib Bank of Pakistan as a form of aid. In the same year, an economic and cultural agreement was also signed, in which a combined shipping company was established.

There are around 30,000 Pakistanis who are residents of Libya. In 2009, the Pakistani government pledged to send 50,000 skilled workers to Libya by the end of the year under a Memorandum of Understanding signed between the two countries during a visit of the President of Pakistan to Libya.
