= Pakistanis in Libya =

- (Pakistan) (Libya)
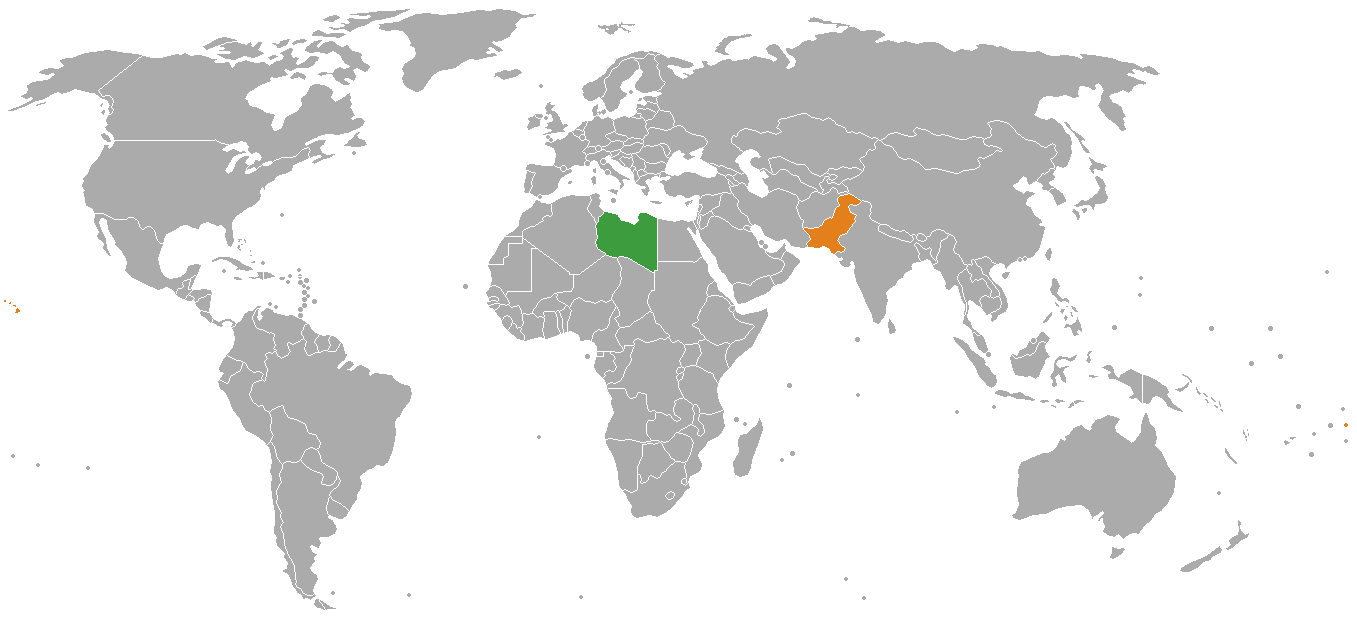

Total population
- 6,000

Regions with significant populations
- Tripoli, Benghazi.

Languages
- Urdu, Punjabi, Arabic others Languages of Pakistan.

Religion
- Islam

Related ethnic groups
- Overseas Pakistanis

In the 1970s there were more than 150,000 Pakistanis in Libya, primarily migrant workers. However, by 2009, that number had declined to just 10,000. The decline in numbers has been attributed to Pakistani government inaction in attempting to increase manpower exports. In May 2009, president of Pakistan Asif Ali Zardari visited Libya with the aim of increasing manpower exports, and proposed several measures including starting direct flights between the two countries and opening a joint Pakistani-Libyan bank to facilitate remittances. As of 2023, only 6,000 Pakistanis are in Libya.

There is a Pakistan Community School in the Libyan capital of Tripoli The school was established (in 1974) by the efforts of Pakistani community and Pakistan Embassy Tripoli .

== Notable people ==
- Nadia Ali - Pakistani American singer and songwriter

== See also ==
- Filipinos in Libya
- Italian Libyans
- Koreans in Libya
