= Pakistanis in South Africa =

- (Pakistan) (South Africa)

Total population
- 70,000–100,000

Regions with significant populations
- Johannesburg, Cape Town, Durban, East London, Port Elizabeth, Grahamstown

Languages
- Urdu · Pashto · English · Punjabi

Religion
- Islam

Related ethnic groups
- Overseas Pakistani

Pakistanis in South Africa include Overseas Pakistanis and people of Pakistani descent who reside in South Africa. The majority of them live in Cape Town, Johannesburg, Durban and Grahamstown.

Many expatriates run spaza shops and cellphone stores; Fordsburg is said to be a place in the country to find Pakistani cuisine. The number of people arriving from Pakistan has increased significantly in the last 10 years. Many have found work in grocery, electronics and cell phone businesses. Many Pakistanis are working in the field of medicine throughout the country, as well as the importing of cars from Japan in Durban.

In Feb 2010, a crowd of South African rioters, protesting unemployment issues, burnt tyres and barricaded roads in a northern township in Johannesburg. Local media reported that Pakistani shopkeepers were among those whose premises were looted.

The Pakistan South Africa Association (or PSSA) is an organization that represents Pakistanis in South Africa. It has 16 units that operate its offices from all provinces and has the central executive office in Pretoria. During the COVID-19 pandemic, the PSSA provided aid for the South African community with daily food parcels, medicine, and more. The city of Tshwane issued a letter of appreciation to acknowledge their efforts. Zahid Afzal is an emerging leader in the Pakistani community who is currently serving the association as chairman for social and welfare.

== See also ==
- Pakistan–South Africa relations
- Pakistani diaspora
- Immigration to South Africa
