= Pakistani diaspora =

Pakistani nationals and citizens who reside outside of Pakistan

Overseas Pakistanis بیرون ملک پاکستانی نژاد
- Map of overseas Pakistani diaspora around the world

Total population
- c. 9,993,362 (2022 estimate) (Note: calculated total for collected data of population by country, from different sources (censuses, migration data, etc.). See statistics by country.)

Regions with significant populations
- Saudi Arabia: 1,814,678 (2022 census)
- United Kingdom: 1,662,286 (2021); England: 1,570,285 – 2.8% (2021); Scotland: 72,871 – 1.3% (2022); Wales: 17,534 – 0.6% (2021); Northern Ireland: 1,596 – 0.08% (2021)
- UAE: 1,600,000 (2020 estimate)
- India (born in Pakistan): 918,982 (2011 census)
- United States: 684,438 (2023 American Community Survey)
- Kuwait: 339,033 (2020 estimate)
- Canada: 303,260 (2021 official census)
- Oman: 250,092 (2020 estimate)
- Qatar: 235,505 (2020 estimate)
- Afghanistan: 221,432 (2015 estimate)
- Italy: 162,413 (2024 official - foreign born only)
- Germany: 140,000 (2022 official)
- Spain: 135,696 (2025 official)
- Bahrain: 117,000 (2019-2020 estimate)
- France: 100,000 (official estimate)
- Australia: 89,633 (2021 official census)
- Malaysia: 148,887 (2026 official statistics)
- Norway: 46,300 (2023 official)
- Greece: 34,177 (2011 official census)
- Portugal: 30,000 (2024)
- Denmark: 29,418 (2026 official)
- Sweden: 27,292 (2022 official)
- Netherlands: 27,261 (2022 official)
- Japan: 23,417 (2023 official)

Languages
- English, Urdu, Punjabi, Pashto, Sindhi, Balochi, Hindko, other languages of Pakistan and languages spoken in respective country of residence.

Religion
- Predominantly Islam, with minorities of Christianity, Hinduism, and Sikhism.

Overseas Pakistanis (Urdu: بیرون ملک پاکستانی نژاد), or the Pakistani diaspora, refer to Pakistanis who live outside of Pakistan. These include citizens who have migrated to another country as well as people born abroad of Pakistani descent. They form a part of the broader South Asian diaspora, commonly referred to as the Desi diaspora.

According to a December 2017 estimate by the Ministry of Overseas Pakistanis and Human Resource Development, approximately 8.8 million Pakistanis live abroad. Data released in 2023 by the Ministry of Emigration and Overseas Employment states that more than 10.80 million Pakistanis have moved abroad since 1990.

The vast majority, over 4.7 million, reside in the Middle East. The second-largest community, around 1.6 million, lives in the United Kingdom, followed by the United States (especially in New York City, Chicago, and New Jersey) in third place. Other European countries such as Italy, Germany, Spain and Norway also host large Pakistani communities, as do Canada and Australia.

According to the UN Department of Economic and Social Affairs, Pakistan has the 6th largest diaspora in the world.

In 2021, overseas Pakistanis sent record remittances with growth at 26 percent and levels reaching US$33 billion.

== Terminology ==
The term Overseas Pakistani is officially recognised by the Government of Pakistan. It refers to Pakistani citizens who have not resided in Pakistan for a specified period (for the purpose of income tax) and to people born abroad who are of Pakistani descent.

=== National Identity Card for Overseas Pakistanis ===
The National Identity Card for Overseas Pakistanis, or NICOP, is a Computerised National Identity Card issued to workers, emigrants, citizens, or Pakistanis holding dual nationality. NICOP was conceived by NADRA in 2002 as a project of mutual resolve between the Overseas Pakistanis Foundation, the Ministry of Labour & Manpower, and the Ministry of Interior. All NICOP holders are registered in the NADRA database to provide authenticity of the individual and visa-free entry into Pakistan. Proof of family relationships is necessary for various legal and administrative purposes involving NICOP.

=== Pakistan Origin Card ===
The Pakistan Origin Card, or POC, is issued by Pakistani embassies or high commissions to people of Pakistani origin living abroad. POC are not issued to those with dual nationalities.

== Emigration from Pakistan ==
Emigration from the territories that now constitute Pakistan began as early as 3000 BC.

=== Prehistoric ===
The presence of Harappan merchants in Mesopotamia from the Indus Valley Civilisation is suggested by various forms of glyptic evidence. A recently discovered Mesopotamian cylinder seal inscription reveals that an interpreter from "Meluhha" (Harappa) was present. Several Indus-scripted seals have also been discovered in excavations.

=== Middle Ages ===
During the 10th century, Arabic chronicles mention tribes coming into contact with Baloch settlers. The majority of Baloch settlers originated from the Makran coast and settled in what is today Oman, forming part of the Bedoon community. Many of them worked in various trades, including barbers, fan operators, and shopkeepers. Some were even drafted as soldiers for the army of the Iman of Oman. A small population of Muslim clergy from Punjab, Kashmir, and Sindh settled in Mecca by the 14th century to aid travellers from the region making the journey for Hajj and to help expand Islam throughout the Indus Valley and its tributaries. Bankers and merchants from southern Punjab (Multan) and northern Sindh (Shikarpur) were present in Safavid Persia during the 15th century, living alongside Jews and Armenians. Pashtun traders arrived by boat in Batticaloa, Sri Lanka, as early as the 15th century. The Mukkuvar locals established an alliance with the Pashtun traders, enlisting their help to fend off incursions from rivals in the north. The traders were rewarded through marriages and settled in Eravur. Their settlement may have been deliberate, forming a buffer against future invasions from the north. When Arab and Persian merchants expanded maritime trade routes in the 16th century, Sindh became fully integrated into the inter-Asian trade network. This led to increased trade and navigational interactions between Sindhi merchants and Arab/Persian merchants. Sindh also maintained independent commercial relations with East Asia and Southeast Asia, particularly with the Kedah Sultanate on the Malay Peninsula.

=== Colonial era (1842–1947) ===
After the fall of Sindh in 1842 and Punjab in 1849, a large part of the territory of today's Pakistan came under rule of the British Empire. From 1842 to 1857, a small number of immigrants from Punjab, Sindh, and Kashmir began arriving in the British Isles as employees of the British East India Company, typically as lashkars and sailors in British port cities. After the establishment of the British Raj in 1858, Baloch and Pashtuns, along with Punjabis, Sindhis, and Kashmiris, continued coming to Britain as seamen, traders, students, domestic workers, cricketers, political officials, and visitors. A small number of them settled in the region. Many influential members of the Pakistan Movement, including Muhammad Iqbal and Muhammad Ali Jinnah, spent a considerable amount of time in Britain and Europe, studying at major British institutions. Between 1860 and 1930, camel caravans worked in Outback Australia, which included Pashtun, Punjabi, Baloch, and Sindhi men as well as others from Kashmir. By 1900, Punjabis and Pashtuns began migrating to other parts of the British Empire. Many were veterans of the British Army, but also included a small migrant population who were legally considered British subjects. Pashtun migrants opted for the British Trucial States, where the British used their subjects as a valuable human resource in running the administration. British Columbia became a destination for many Punjabi migrants as agents of the Canadian Pacific Railway and the Hudson's Bay Company guaranteed jobs for them between 1902 and 1905. However, many Punjabi migrants returned due to racism and the curtailing of migration of non-whites by the Canadian government. Others sought opportunities by moving to the United States, particularly Yuba City, California. Poor wages and working conditions convinced Punjabi workers to pool their resources, lease land, and grow their own crops, thereby establishing themselves in the newly budding farming economy of northern California.

Many people from modern Pakistan migrated and settled in Malaysia, which was also part of the British Empire. The Malays and Pakistanis share a strong Muslim identity. At the time of Malaysia's independence under the Federation of Malaya Independence Act 1957, there were more than two hundred thousand Pakistanis residing in Malaysia. Rather than forming a separate group under the categorized system, at the suggestion of the Malays themselves, Pakistanis immersed themselves into the Malay group. Thus, they became part of the Bumiputra elite, enriched by social ties, intermarriage, and shared economic and political aspirations. They also took positions in the civil service administration and gradually rose to the upper echelons of government, becoming inextricably intermixed with the Malay majority. Many elite Malay families have at least one grandparent who was Pakistani. Diplomats, judges, legislators, and other government cadres include people with recognized Pakistani-Malay bloodlines.

=== Post independence ===
==== 1947 to 1970 ====
Emigration from Pakistan was relatively small between 1947 and 1970. The rapid industrialization of Pakistan during the 1950s and 1960s, coupled with the introduction of modern agricultural practices, pushed out surplus labor, leading to mass rural-to-urban migration, primarily to Karachi. During this period, the majority of Pakistanis who went abroad considered themselves "sojourners", who left to earn money but did not intend to settle, or were students who planned to return to Pakistan after completing their degree programs. By 1971, no more than 900,000 Pakistanis lived abroad, with most residing in the United Kingdom and Saudi Arabia. In 1959, small numbers of Pakistanis were found working in Bahrain, Kuwait, and elsewhere in the Persian Gulf. By 1960, the Pakistani community in Bahrain numbered 2,200, while almost half of the population in Kuwait comprised non-nationals, including a small number from Pakistan. Pakistan was already the single most important source of non-Arab expatriate labor in the Kuwait Oil Company (representing about 19% of the workforce) and trailed only Americans among those working for Saudi Aramco in Saudi Arabia, representing 6% of the workforce.

The first mass migration of Pakistanis began in 1965 during the construction of the Mangla Dam in Azad Jammu & Kashmir. Over 280 villages around Mirpur and Dadyal were submerged, which led to the displacement of over 110,000 people from the region. Pakistanis also emigrated from these areas and the regions of Attock and Nowshera due to high levels of unemployment and harsh terrain that made farming difficult. During the same period, the British government actively sought workers from abroad for industrial towns in north-west England, which were suffering from labor shortages. Many Pakistani emigrants relocated to work in towns like Rochdale, Newcastle, Bristol, High Wycombe, Birmingham, Dewsbury, Huddersfield, and Bradford. Consequently, many work permits for Britain were awarded to the displaced population of Mirpur. Close to 50,000 Pakistanis from Mirpur emigrated to northern England between 1965 and 1970. Those who emigrated during this time were aided by the 1948 British Nationality Act, which allowed people from British Commonwealth countries, such as Pakistan, to travel and settle in Britain as they were considered British citizens.

==== 1971 to present ====
The availability of a large-scale labor force from Pakistan resulted from a combination of economic, social, and institutional factors at home. By 1970, Pakistan was passing through a serious economic and political crisis, which eventually led to the secession of East Pakistan in 1971. The rapid economic development of the 1950s and 1960s could not be sustained by 1970, and a wave of nationalization of business and industry was unfolding under Prime Minister Zulfiqar Ali Bhutto. This led to slower large-scale industrialization due to a new wave of industrial unrest and disaffection between industrialists and Bhutto's government, which favored the nationalization of banking, large-scale trading, and industry.

Rural-to-urban migration into Karachi slowed during the 1970s and 80s and was replaced by a rising wave of international migration to Saudi Arabia, Kuwait, or Libya. The profile of the workforce and their places of origin followed the established patterns of internal migration routes. These included people from NWFP, northern Punjab (Potohar Plateau), the Seraiki belt in southern Punjab, and the hill tracts of Azad Jammu & Kashmir. Institutionally, a network of information chains to seek work and the channels for remitting money to families back in Pakistan already existed. The majority of migrants were young males who sought work abroad while families remained in Pakistan. These channels soon expanded and adapted to new requirements and conditions. During the 1960s and 1970s, the remaining Pakistani Jewish community of 2000 began emigrating to Israel and settled in Ramla.

Today's Pakistani diaspora is substantial, with over 9 million Pakistanis residing abroad, including an estimated 4 million in the Persian Gulf region. This represents a significant portion of the population seeking opportunities beyond their homeland. Emigration trends indicate a continued outflow, with 325,142 individuals departing in the first half of 2024 alone. The year 2015 witnessed a peak in outbound migration, as 946,571 Pakistanis left the country primarily in pursuit of employment and enhanced career prospects.

The expatriate labor force in the Persian Gulf has followed a "circulating work force" pattern. Workers come in, work for a few years, periodically visit Pakistan for short or long breaks, and then return permanently.

== Ministry of Overseas Pakistanis and Human Resource Development ==
The Ministry of Overseas Pakistanis and Human Resource Development is a ministry of the Government of Pakistan that oversees matters concerning Overseas Pakistanis and human resource development in Pakistan. Aun Chaudhry is the current minister. The ministry was created in June 2013 from a merger of the Ministry of Overseas Pakistanis and the Ministry of Human Resource Development, which was established in 2008. The Bureau of Emigration & Overseas Employment appoints Community Welfare Attachés (CWA) around the world to establish and maintain close contacts with foreign firms in need of manpower for their ventures in different countries, and to aid in the welfare of overseas Pakistanis. CWAs are currently located in:

- Bahrain (Manama)
- Canada (Toronto, Vancouver)
- Germany (Frankfurt)
- Greece (Athens)
- Italy (Milan)
- Kuwait (Kuwait City)
- Malaysia (Kuala Lumpur)
- Norway (Oslo)
- Oman (Muscat)
- Qatar (Doha)
- Saudi Arabia (Jeddah, Riyadh)
- Spain (Barcelona)
- United Arab Emirates (Abu Dhabi, Dubai, Sharjah)
- United Kingdom (London, Manchester, Birmingham, Glasgow)
- United States (New York City, Washington, D.C., Chicago, Houston, Los Angeles)

== Overseas Pakistanis Foundation ==
The Overseas Pakistanis Foundation (OPF) was established in July 1979, with its head office in Islamabad and regional offices in all provincial capitals as well as Mirpur, Azad Jammu and Kashmir. The objective of the OPF is to advance the welfare of Pakistanis working or settled abroad and their families in Pakistan by identifying their problems and contributing to their solutions. These include health care, financial aid, foreign exchange remittance, and education. The Overseas Pakistanis Foundation operates more than 24 schools in and across Pakistan, offering preschool, primary, secondary, and preparation for local SSC and the international GCE education. Most of its students opt to take the GCE O and AS/A Levels organized by the CIE of UCLES. It has also established international projects in the United Arab Emirates, Saudi Arabia, and the United Kingdom. The head office of the OPF schools is located in Islamabad, administering the system through six main regional offices:

- Regional Office Karachi, Sindh (ROK)- Karachi Metropolitan Area and Sindh
- Regional Office Lahore, Punjab (ROL) - Punjab
- Regional Office Multan, Punjab (ROM) - some divisions of Punjab under ROM like Multan, Bahawalpur, Dera Ghazi Khan
- Regional Office Northern Areas, Mirpur (AJK) - Gilgit-Baltistan, Azad Jammu and Kashmir
- Regional Office Peshawar, Khyber-Pakhtunkhwa (ROP) - Khyber Pakthunkhwa
- Regional Office Quetta, Balochistan (ROQ) - Balochistan

== Relations with Pakistan ==
Millions of Pakistanis emigrated to various countries during the 1970s and 1980s. Unlike European immigrants who settled permanently in the new world, many Pakistanis who emigrated considered themselves "sojourners", who left to earn money abroad but not to settle, or were students who intended to return to Pakistan upon completing their degree programs.

=== Little Pakistan ===
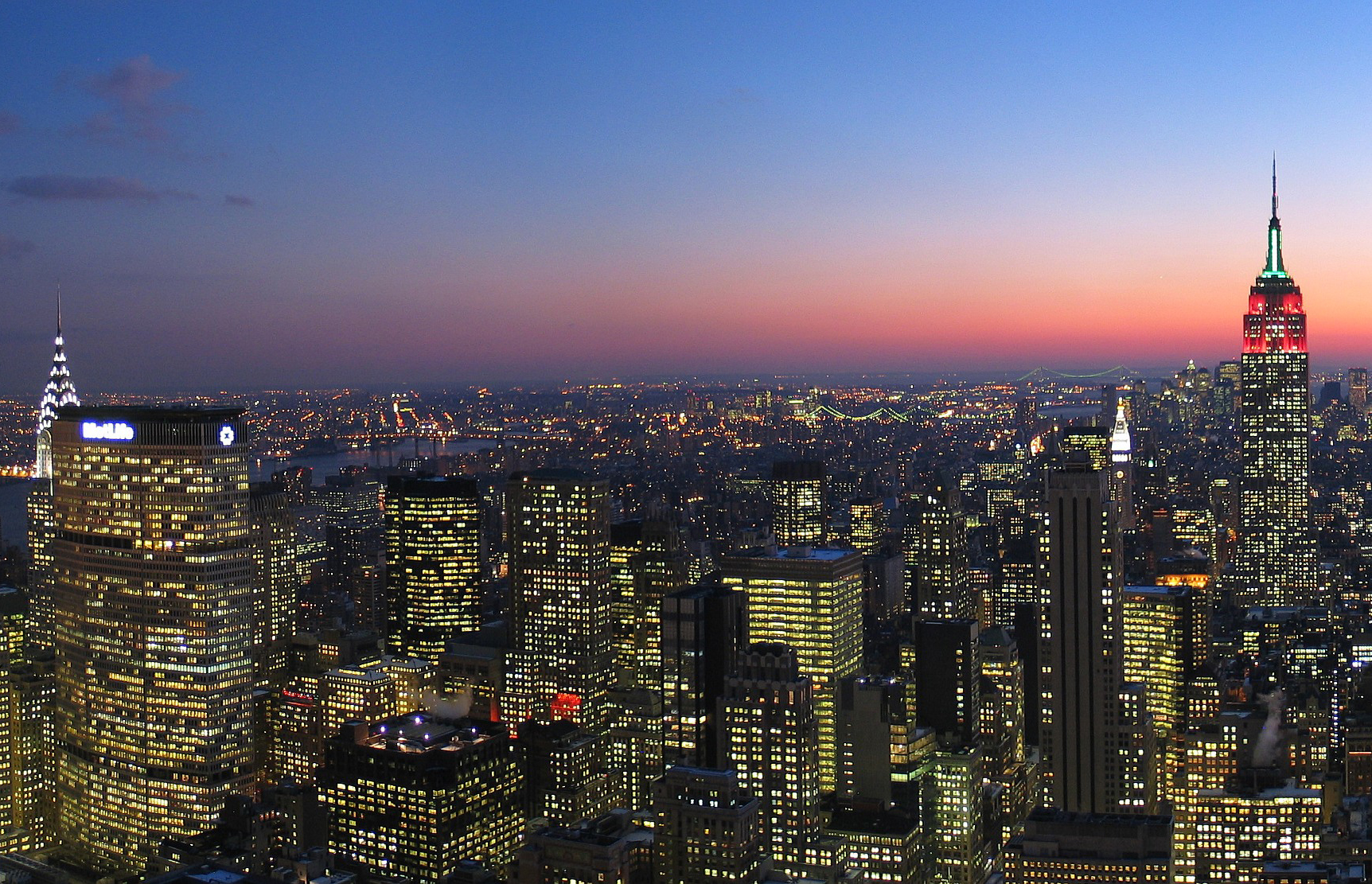
The New York City Metropolitan Area, including New York City, Central New Jersey, as well as Long Island in New York, is home to the largest Pakistani American population.

Little Pakistan is a general name for an ethnic enclave primarily populated by Pakistanis or people of Pakistani ancestry abroad, usually in an urban neighborhood all over the world

=== Pakistan International School ===
Pakistan International Schools are schools based outside Pakistan that promote the national curriculum. These schools fall under the jurisdiction of the Federal Board of Intermediate and Secondary Education and mainly cater to students who are not nationals of the host country, such as children of the staff of international businesses, organizations, embassies, missions, or missionary programs. For overseas Pakistani families, these schools provide continuity in education from Pakistan, as most prefer to stay within the same curriculum, especially for older children. Pakistan International Schools typically use curricula based on the Federal Board of Intermediate and Secondary Education and offer both Urdu and English language classes. There are notable Pakistani International Schools in Oman, Saudi Arabia and Qatar

=== From the Middle East ===
Since the independence of Pakistan in 1947, there has been a large population of Pakistanis in the Middle East, mainly in Saudi Arabia. However, since the 1990s, many have opted for countries like the United Arab Emirates, Bahrain, and Kuwait. Pakistanis who immigrated to these countries or were born there tended to stay close to Pakistani culture. Many "Pakistan International Schools" were opened to cater to the large population and allow them to study under the same boards as students in Pakistan. As a result, those returning to Pakistan from the Middle East have found it much easier to adjust. Pakistanis from the Middle East can be found throughout the country today, usually fluent in Urdu, English, and their regional language. They are mostly involved in trading, media, telecommunications, banking, and aviation.

=== From Europe ===
Since the 1990s, a large number of Pakistanis who settled in Europe have been returning to Pakistan. Those born in Europe have also maintained close links to Pakistani culture. However, there are instances where children did not learn Urdu while growing up or were not accustomed to Pakistani culture. As a result, those returning from Europe experience "culture shocks". Returnees from Norway and Denmark are mostly settled around Kharian in Punjab province, whereas those from northern England (Bradford) can be found in Azad Kashmir (mainly Mirpur), Khyber Pakhtunkhwa, and upper Punjab (Jhelum, Chakwal, Attock, and Rawalpindi).

=== From the Americas ===
Historically, only a small number of Pakistanis from Canada and the United States have returned to Pakistan. While they frequently visit during the summer and winter vacations, permanent settlement was not popular among them until 2001. However, since the September 11 attacks and the 2008 financial crisis, many Pakistani Americans and Pakistani Canadians have begun to return. The population of returning expatriates from the Americas, who often have excellent credentials, has increased significantly due to new job opportunities in Pakistan. Many of these returnees can be found in major cities such as Karachi, Lahore, Rawalpindi, Islamabad, Faisalabad, and Peshawar, as well as in smaller cities and towns like Sialkot. Those returning from North America generally find it easier to secure jobs in Pakistan and are involved in a wide range of fields, including healthcare, engineering, law, banking, information technology, mass media, and industry.

=== Remittances ===
Remittances sent by year ($US billion)
| Year | Remittance ($ billion) |
|---|---|
| 2003 | 4.23 |
| 2004 | 3.87 |
| 2005 | 4.17 |
| 2006 | 4.61 |
| 2007 | 6.51 |
| 2008 | 7.81 |
| 2009 | 8.91 |
| 2010 | 9.32 |
| 2011 | 11.21 |
| 2012 | 13.19 |
| 2013 | 13.90 |
| 2014 | 15.80 |
| 2015 | 18.72 |
| 2016 | 19.92 |
| 2017 | 22.30 |
| 2018 | 19.9 |
| 2019 | 21.7 |
| 2020 | 23.1 |
| 2021 | 29.4 |
| 2022 | 31.2 |
| 2023 | 27 |

== Population by country ==
A map showing the distribution and population of Pakistan diaspora by country.: Pakistan + 1,000,000 + 100,000 / + 10,000 + 1,000 No data

Population of Pakistanis abroad, by country, according to the 2019-20 Ministry of Overseas Pakistanis and Human Resource Development Yearbook, or other estimates (if indicated).

| Country | Article | Overseas Pakistani population | World Region | Total population in the region |
|---|---|---|---|---|
| Indonesia | Pakistanis in Indonesia | 8,645 (2020 estimate) | Southeast Asia | 110,488 |
| Malaysia | Pakistanis in Malaysia | 85,013 (2020 estimate) | Southeast Asia | 110,488 |
| Thailand | Pakistanis in Thailand | 6,500 | Southeast Asia | 110,488 |
| Singapore | Pakistanis in Singapore | 4,562 (2012) | Southeast Asia | 110,488 |
| Myanmar | Pakistanis in Burma | 3,101 (2020 estimate) | Southeast Asia | 110,488 |
| Brunei | Pakistanis in Brunei | 893 (2020 estimate) | Southeast Asia | 110,488 |
| Vietnam | Pakistanis in Vietnam | 622 (2020 estimate) | Southeast Asia | 110,488 |
| Philippines | Pakistanis in Philippines | 451 (2020 census) | Southeast Asia | 110,488 |
| Cambodia | Pakistanis in Cambodia | 350 | Southeast Asia | 110,488 |
| East Timor | Pakistanis in East Timor | 301 (2020 estimate) | Southeast Asia | 110,488 |
| Laos | Pakistanis in Laos | 50 | Southeast Asia | 110,488 |
| Japan | Pakistanis in Japan | 22,118 (2022 official) | East Asia | 69,738 |
| Hong Kong | Pakistanis in Hong Kong | 18,178 (2021 census) | East Asia | 69,738 |
| China | Pakistanis in China | 15,000 | East Asia | 69,738 |
| Taiwan | Pakistanis in Taiwan | 259 (2022 official) | East Asia | 69,738 |
| South Korea | Pakistanis in South Korea | 13,990 (2019 official) | East Asia | 69,738 |
| North Korea | Pakistanis in North Korea | 172 (2020 estimate) | East Asia | 69,738 |
| Mongolia | Pakistanis in Mongolia | 21 (2020 estimate) | East Asia | 69,738 |
| Bhutan | Pakistanis in Bhutan | 21 (2020 estimate) | South Asia | 1,035,444 |
| Bangladesh | Pakistanis in Bangladesh | 11,196 (2011 census) | South Asia | 1,035,444 |
| India | Pakistanis in India | 918,982 (2011 census) | South Asia | 1,035,444 |
| Afghanistan | Pakistanis in Afghanistan | 102,500 (2020 estimate) | South Asia | 1,035,444 |
| Nepal | Pakistanis in Nepal | 1,212 (2020 estimate) | South Asia | 1,035,444 |
| Sri Lanka | Pakistanis in Sri Lanka | 1,083 (2020 estimate) | South Asia | 1,035,444 |
| Maldives | Pakistanis in Maldives | 450 | South Asia | 1,035,444 |
| Saudi Arabia | Pakistanis in Saudi Arabia | 2,714,684 | West Asia | 5,359,721 |
| United Arab Emirates | Pakistanis in the United Arab Emirates | 1,600,000 | West Asia | 5,359,721 |
| Kuwait | Pakistanis in Kuwait | 339,033 (2020 estimate) | West Asia | 5,359,721 |
| Oman | Pakistanis in Oman | 250,092 (2020 estimate) | West Asia | 5,359,721 |
| Qatar | Pakistanis in Qatar | 235,505 (2020 estimate) | West Asia | 5,359,721 |
| Bahrain | Pakistanis in Bahrain | 117,000 | West Asia | 5,359,721 |
| Jordan | Pakistanis in Jordan | 16,500 | West Asia | 5,359,721 |
| Iran | Pakistanis in Iran | 14,320 (2016 census) | West Asia | 5,359,721 |
| Libya | Pakistanis in Libya | 6,000 | West Asia | 5,359,721 |
| Cyprus | Pakistanis in Cyprus | 4,000 | West Asia | 5,359,721 |
| Yemen | Pakistanis in Yemen | 3,024 (2017 estimate) | West Asia | 5,359,721 |
| Syria | Pakistanis in Syria | 481 | West Asia | 5,359,721 |
| Lebanon | Pakistanis in Lebanon | 721 (2020 estimate) | West Asia | 5,359,721 |
| Iraq | Pakistanis in Iraq | 688 (2020 estimate) | West Asia | 5,359,721 |
| Georgia | Pakistanis in Georgia | 27; 86 (2002 census) | West Asia | 5,359,721 |
| Azerbaijan | Pakistanis in Azerbaijan | 274 (2022 official) | West Asia | 5,359,721 |
| (Turkey) Türkiye | Pakistanis in Türkiye | 17,290 (2021 official) | West Asia | 5,359,721 |
| Uzbekistan | Pakistanis in Uzbekistan | 357 | Central Asia | 2,824 |
| Kazakhstan | Pakistanis in Kazakhstan | 350 | Central Asia | 2,824 |
| Kyrgyzstan | Pakistanis in Kyrgyzstan | 2000 | Central Asia | 2,824 |
| Tajikistan | Pakistanis in Tajikistan | 103 (2020 estimate) | Central Asia | 2,824 |
| Turkmenistan | Pakistanis in Turkmenistan | 14 | Central Asia | 2,824 |
| Sudan | Pakistanis in Sudan | 2,000 | Africa | 49,467 |
| Algeria | Pakistanis in Algeria | 2,500 | Africa | 49,467 |
| Mauritania | Pakistanis in Mauritania | 50 | Africa | 49,467 |
| Morocco | Pakistanis in Morocco | 176 (2017 estimate) | Africa | 49,467 |
| Egypt | Pakistanis in Egypt | 619 (2020 estimate) | Africa | 49,467 |
| Tunisia | Pakistanis in Tunisia | 500 | Africa | 49,467 |
| South Africa | Pakistanis in South Africa | 11,157 (2016 official) | Africa | 49,467 |
| Kenya | Pakistanis in Kenya | 10,000 | Africa | 49,467 |
| Uganda | Pakistanis in Uganda | 5,000 | Africa | 49,467 |
| Mozambique | Pakistanis in Mozambique | 4,423 (2020 estimate) | Africa | 49,467 |
| Tanzania | Pakistanis in Tanzania | 3,050 | Africa | 49,467 |
| Nigeria | Pakistanis in Nigeria | 2,050 | Africa | 49,467 |
| Mali | Pakistanis in Mali | 1,500 | Africa | 49,467 |
| Zimbabwe | Pakistanis in Zimbabwe | 700 | Africa | 49,467 |
| Malawi | Pakistanis in Malawi | 515 | Africa | 49,467 |
| Burundi | Pakistanis in Burundi | 500 | Africa | 49,467 |
| Rwanda | Pakistanis in Rwanda | 500 | Africa | 49,467 |
| Liberia | Pakistanis in Liberia | 500 | Africa | 49,467 |
| Botswana | Pakistanis in Botswana | 464 (2020 estimate) | Africa | 49,467 |
| Lesotho | Pakistanis in Lesotho | 419 (2020 estimate) | Africa | 49,467 |
| Mauritius | Pakistanis in Mauritius | 378 | Africa | 49,467 |
| Zambia | Pakistanis in Zambia | 350 | Africa | 49,467 |
| Djibouti | Pakistanis in Djibouti | 300 | Africa | 49,467 |
| South Sudan | Pakistanis in South Sudan | 250 | Africa | 49,467 |
| Ethiopia | Pakistanis in Ethiopia | 240 | Africa | 49,467 |
| Namibia | Pakistanis in Namibia | 173 (2020 estimate) | Africa | 49,467 |
| Madagascar | Pakistanis in Madagascar | 138 | Africa | 49,467 |
| Senegal | Pakistanis in Senegal | 122 | Africa | 49,467 |
| Congo DR | Pakistanis in Democratic Republic of the Congo | 115 | Africa | 49,467 |
| Gambia | Pakistanis in Gambia | 109 | Africa | 49,467 |
| Eritrea | Pakistanis in Eritrea | 100 | Africa | 49,467 |
| Sierra Leone | Pakistanis in Sierra Leone | 86 (2020 estimate) | Africa | 49,467 |
| Ghana | Pakistanis in Ghana | 76 (2020 estimate) | Africa | 49,467 |
| Angola | Pakistanis in Angola | 75 | Africa | 49,467 |
| Somalia | Pakistanis in Somalia | 72 (2017 estimate) | Africa | 49,467 |
| Niger | Pakistanis in Niger | 68 | Africa | 49,467 |
| Ivory Coast | Pakistanis in Ivory Coast | 66 | Africa | 49,467 |
| Réunion (France) | Pakistanis in Réunion | 45 (2015 census) | Africa | 49,467 |
| Guinea | Pakistanis in Guinea | 29 (2014 census) | Africa | 49,467 |
| Seychelles | Pakistanis in Seychelles | 28 | Africa | 49,467 |
| Comoros | Pakistanis in Comoros | 14 | Africa | 49,467 |
| Guinea Bissau | Pakistanis in Guinea Bissau | 10 | Africa | 49,467 |
| Brazil | Pakistanis in Brazil | 2,348 (2022 official) | Latin America | 4,220 |
| Chile | Pakistanis in Chile | 653 (2017 census) | Latin America | 4,220 |
| Mexico | Pakistanis in Mexico | 331 (2020 census) | Latin America | 4,220 |
| Ecuador | Pakistanis in Ecuador | 225 | Latin America | 4,220 |
| Peru | Pakistanis in Peru | 153 (2017 official) | Latin America | 4,220 |
| Panama | Pakistanis in Panama | 99 (2020 estimate) | Latin America | 4,220 |
| Dominican Republic | Pakistanis in Dominican Republic | 75 (2010 census) | Latin America | 4,220 |
| Uruguay | Pakistanis in Uruguay | 75 | Latin America | 4,220 |
| Argentina | Pakistanis in Argentina | 64 (2010 census) | Latin America | 4,220 |
| Bolivia | Pakistanis in Bolivia | 40 | Latin America | 4,220 |
| Venezuela | Pakistanis in Venezuela | 40 | Latin America | 4,220 |
| Colombia | Pakistanis in Colombia | 37 (2018 census) | Latin America | 4,220 |
| Paraguay | Pakistanis in Paraguay | 30 | Latin America | 4,220 |
| Guatemala | Pakistanis in Guatemala | 26 (2020 estimate) | Latin America | 4,220 |
| Nicaragua | Pakistanis in Nicaragua | 14 | Latin America | 4,220 |
| Puerto Rico (USA) | Pakistanis in Puerto Rico | 10 (2021 census) | Latin America | 4,220 |
| United States | Pakistani Americans | 684,438 (2023 American Community Survey) | Northern America | 987,698 |
| Canada | Pakistani Canadian | 303,260 (2021 official census) | Northern America | 987,698 |
| Trinidad and Tobago | Pakistanis in Trinidad and Tobago | 88 | Caribbean | 209 |
| Bermuda (UK) | Pakistanis in Bermuda | 29 (2020 estimate) | Caribbean | 209 |
| Guyana | Pakistanis in Guyana | 25 | Caribbean | 209 |
| Suriname | Pakistanis in Suriname | 25 | Caribbean | 209 |
| Grenada | Pakistanis in Grenada | 21 | Caribbean | 209 |
| Cayman Islands (UK) | Pakistanis in Cayman Islands | 11 (2019 official) | Caribbean | 209 |
| Barbados | Pakistanis in Barbados | 10 | Caribbean | 209 |
| United Kingdom | British Pakistanis, Pakistanis in London | United Kingdom: 1,662,286 (2011 official UK census) (Note: This census figure may not include recent immigrants or people of partial Pakistani ancestry.); England: 1,570,287 (2021 census); Scotland: 49,381 (2011 census); Wales: 17,535 (2021 census); Northern Ireland: 1,596 (2021 census) | Europe | 2,243,152 |
| Italy | Pakistanis in Italy | 162,413 (2024 official) | Europe | 2,243,152 |
| Germany | Pakistanis in Germany | 140,000 (2022 official) | Europe | 2,243,152 |
| Spain | Pakistanis in Spain | 135,696 (2025 official) | Europe | 2,243,152 |
| Norway | Pakistanis in Norway | 46,300 (2023 official) | Europe | 2,243,152 |
| Greece | Pakistanis in Greece | 34,177 (2011 official census) | Europe | 2,243,152 |
| Portugal | Pakistanis in Portugal | 30,000 (2024 official Pakistani embassy estimate) | Europe | 2,243,152 |
| France | Pakistanis in France | 29,387 (2019 official) | Europe | 2,243,152 |
| Sweden | Pakistanis in Sweden | 27,292 (2022 official) | Europe | 2,243,152 |
| Netherlands | Pakistanis in the Netherlands | 27,261 (2022 official) | Europe | 2,243,152 |
| Denmark | Pakistanis in Denmark | 26,714 (2023 official estimate) | Europe | 2,243,152 |
| Belgium | Pakistanis in Belgium | 19,247 (2012 official estimate) | Europe | 2,243,152 |
| Republic of Ireland | Pakistanis in Ireland | 12,891 (2016 official census) | Europe | 2,243,152 |
| Austria | Pakistanis in Austria | 5,914 (2021 census) | Europe | 2,243,152 |
| Finland | Pakistanis in Finland | 4,726 (2022 official estimate) | Europe | 2,243,152 |
| Switzerland | Pakistanis in Switzerland | 3,217 (2020 official estimate) | Europe | 2,243,152 |
| Ukraine | Pakistanis in Ukraine | 2,000 | Europe | 2,243,152 |
| Russia | Pakistanis in Russia | 1,878 (2015 official) | Europe | 2,243,152 |
| Hungary | Pakistanis in Hungary | 1,719 (2022 official) | Europe | 2,243,152 |
| Poland | Pakistanis in Poland | 1,318 | Europe | 2,243,152 |
| Romania | Pakistanis in Romania | 1,032 (2020 estimate) | Europe | 2,243,152 |
| Czech Republic | Pakistanis in Czech Republic | 979 (2022 official) | Europe | 2,243,152 |
| Estonia | Pakistanis in Estonia | 555 (2021 census) | Europe | 2,243,152 |
| Malta | Pakistanis in Malta | 549 (2020 estimate) | Europe | 2,243,152 |
| Albania | Pakistanis in Albania | 491 (irregular foreigners) (2019 official) | Europe | 2,243,152 |
| Bulgaria | Pakistanis in Bulgaria | 456 (2022 official) | Europe | 2,243,152 |
| Luxembourg | Pakistanis in Luxembourg | 206 (2020 official) | Europe | 2,243,152 |
| Latvia | Pakistanis in Latvia | 144 (2023 official) | Europe | 2,243,152 |
| Iceland | Pakistanis in Iceland | 137 (2022 official) | Europe | 2,243,152 |
| Slovakia | Pakistanis in Slovakia | 130 (2020 official) | Europe | 2,243,152 |
| Belarus | Pakistanis in Belarus | 120 | Europe | 2,243,152 |
| Lithuania | Pakistanis in Lithuania | 51 (2021 census) | Europe | 2,243,152 |
| Slovenia | Pakistanis in Slovenia | 41 (2022 official) | Europe | 2,243,152 |
| Serbia | Pakistanis in Serbia | 28 | Europe | 2,243,152 |
| Bosnia and Herzegovina | Pakistanis in Bosnia and Herzegovina | 25 | Europe | 2,243,152 |
| Moldova | Pakistanis in Moldova | 16 (2021 official) | Europe | 2,243,152 |
| Croatia | Pakistanis in Croatia | 10 | Europe | 2,243,152 |
| Australia | Pakistani Australian | 120,440 (2023 official census) | Oceania | 130,401 |
| New Zealand | Pakistani New Zealander | 8,094 (2023 census) | Oceania | 130,401 |
| Fiji | Pakistanis in Fiji | 1,867 (2020 estimate) | Oceania | 130,401 |
| Total overseas Pakistani population | | 9,993,362 | | 9,993,362 |

== See also ==
=== Diasporas of Pakistani ethnic groups ===
- Baloch diaspora
- Kashmiri diaspora
- Hazara diaspora
- Muhajir diaspora
- Pashtun diaspora
- Punjabi diaspora
- Sindhi diaspora
- Saraiki diaspora

=== Other ===
- NADRA
- Demographics of Pakistan
- Pakistani students abroad
- Little Pakistan
- Pakistan International Schools

== Bibliography ==
- Mehmood, Maryyum (2021). "Mapping Muslim Moral Provinces: Framing Feminized Piety of Pakistani Diaspora". Religions. 12 (5): 356. doi:10.3390/rel12050356.
