= Pakistanis in Kuwait =

Total population
- 109,853 (2016 official estimate)

Regions with significant populations
- Kuwait City · Khaitan · Salmiya · Jaleeb al shoyoukh · Farwaniya · Mangaf

Languages
- Urdu · Sindhi · Punjabi · Arabic · English · Pashto · Balochi · Languages of Pakistan

Religion
- Islam

The community of Pakistanis in Kuwait includes Pakistani expatriates in Kuwait, as well as Kuwaiti citizens of Pakistani origin or descent. The majority of these originate from the provinces of Punjab (Pakistan) and Khyber Pakhtunkhwa

== Overview ==
Professionals like engineers, doctors, teachers, lawyers, chartered accountants, scientists, software experts, management professionals and consultants, architects, retail traders and businessmen mainly constitute the Pakistani community in Kuwait. During the COVID-19 pandemic, Pakistan sent hundreds of doctors, nurses and technicians to Kuwait.

== Numbers ==
According to official figures published by the Kuwaiti government, the population of Pakistanis in Kuwait as of 2016 was revealed to stand at 109,853. This made Pakistanis the 9th largest group of foreigners in Kuwait.

== Education ==
There are a number of Pakistani schools in Kuwait few of them are listed below:

- Pakistan school and College, Salmiya
- Pakistan English School & College, Jaleeb
- Gulf Pakistan English School, Fahaheel
- Hawally Pakistan English School, Hawally
- New Pakistan International School, Hawally
- Pakistan National English School, Hawally
- Pakistan Sunshine School, Hawally
- International School of Pakistan, Khaitan
- Pakistan Academy School, Ahmadi
- Hadaf Al Munir Pakistan School, Mangaf
- Pakistan Excel English School, Jaleeb

== See also ==
- Kuwait–Pakistan relations
- Pakistani diaspora
- Immigration to Kuwait
