= Germans in Pakistan =

Regions with significant populations
- Karachi · other areas

Languages
- German · Urdu · Sindhi

Religion
- Christianity · Sunni Islam

Related ethnic groups
- Germans in India

There are a number of Germans in Pakistan, consisting of German expatriates in Pakistan, students, families, dual national Pakistani-Germans and Pakistani citizens of German ancestry. Their number may be as much as 100,000 in entire Pakistan. There are Germans in Peshawar. Germany maintains a healthy diplomatic presence in the country, with an embassy in Islamabad, a consulate in Karachi and honorary-consulate in Lahore.

== Militants in the Northwest ==
There have been various reports of unregistered German militants living in the northwest regions of the country near Afghanistan.

In 2009, intelligence investigators discovered a German "village" in Federally Administered Tribal Areas, consisting of hundreds of German al-Qaeda insurgents and Muslim converts. According to the German foreign ministry, a growing number of German families, especially of North African descent, have moved into those regions and live there. The village presents a desirable lifestyle with schools, hospitals, pharmacies and day care centres at a nearby distance.

== Notable people ==
- Atif Bashir - Pakistani footballer of German-Turkish descent
- Peter Finke - German nuclear scientist based in Islamabad
- Elsa Kazi
- Ruth Pfau - Christian nun and social worker
- Esther Rahim

== See also ==
- Pakistan German Business Forum
- Germany–Pakistan relations
- German diaspora
- Immigration to Pakistan
- Pakistanis in Germany
