= Abrar Hassan =

Pakistani biker and travel vlogger

Personal information
- Born: c. 1988
- Birth place: Nankana Sahib, Punjab, Pakistan
- Nationality: German-Pakistani
- Marital status: Married
- Children: Two daughters

Education
- Undergraduate education: Bachelor of Science in Aerospace Engineering
- Alma mater: Institute of Space Technology, Islamabad, Pakistan
- Graduate education: Master of Science in Computational Mechanics, Germany

Career
- Occupation: Travel vlogger, adventure motorcyclist, and digital content creator
- Former occupation: Mechanical engineer in the automotive sector
- Years active: 2008–present (digital); 2020–present (full-time moto-vlogging)

Digital presence
- Subscribers: 2.31 million
- Total views: 574.59 million

Abrar Hassan (Note: Urdu: ابرار حسن, Punjabi: ابرار حسن) is a German-Pakistani biker and vlogger, known for his travel and adventure content. His YouTube channel, WildLens by Abrar, (Note: Urdu: وائلڈ لینز بائے ابرار, Punjabi: وائلڈ لینز بائے ابرار) documents his extensive biking tours across various countries of the Americas, Asia, Africa, Europe, and the Middle East.

== Early life and career ==
Abrar Hassan is a mechanical engineer with over 12 years of experience in the automobile industry.

He moved to Germany in 2008 for further studies after obtaining a bachelor’s degree in aerospace engineering from Institute of Space Technology (IST; ادارہ خلائی ٹیکنالوجی) in Islamabad, Pakistan. He completed his Master's in computational mechanics and worked in the automotive sector in Frankfurt. It was during this time that his interest in travel grew.

In 2019, he decided to leave his job and fully commit to vlogging from Germany to Pakistan and started career in travelling. He learned motorcycle riding and commenced his motorcycle travels in 2020.

== Travels and adventures ==
Abrar has traveled to over 90 countries, with motorcycle journeys in at least 24 of them. His travel journey started in 2020 when he travelled from Germany to Pakistan on his motorbike and he gained popularity during that time. He values connecting with locals, sharing stories, meals, and experiences.

=== Friendship tour of India ===
In 2023, he undertook a 'friendship tour' across India, covering 7,000 kilometers in 30 days. Despite the historical tensions between India and Pakistan, he was warmly welcomed throughout his journey.

=== Journey to Saudi Arabia ===
In the same year, Abrar embarked on a 50-day motorbike journey to Saudi Arabia for the Umrah pilgrimage. Starting from his hometown Nankana Sahib in Pakistan’s Punjab province, he traveled across three countries (Iran, Iraq, Kuwait) before reaching Madinah. He then proceeded to Mecca, where he performed the Umrah pilgrimage.
