= Pakistan–South Africa relations =

- Pakistan: South Africa

Pakistan–South Africa relations refers to the current and historical relationship between the Republic of South Africa and the Islamic Republic of Pakistan. Both are former British colonies and full members of the Commonwealth of Nations.

Relations between South Africa and Pakistan are cordial and go back more than six decades. Since its independence, Pakistan has voiced its opposition against apartheid and racial discrimination in South Africa. Due to embargoes imposed against apartheid South Africa by the Commonwealth of Nations, the two nations did not establish official diplomatic relations until 1994, after the end of apartheid in South Africa. Relations between the two nations are cordial. South Africa exports US$240 million worth of goods to Pakistan on a yearly basis. Pakistan exports slightly less to South Africa (US$210 million), with major items including cotton yarn, woven fabrics, leather, rice and textiles.

== High Commissions ==
Pakistan has a High Commission in Pretoria.

South Africa has a High Commission in Islamabad.

== Economic relations ==
=== Trade and investment ===
	2007		2008		2009		2010		2011		2012		2013		2014		2015		2016	
Pakistan Exports	$233 M	▲	$191 M	▼	$141 M	▼	$221 M	▲	$292 M	▲	$270 M	▼	$316 M	▲	$313 M	▼	$234 M	▲	$181 M	▼
South Africa Exports	$390 M	▲	$357 M	▲	$361 M	▲	$504 M	▲	$465 M	▼	$451 M	▼	$432 M	▼	$674 M	▲	$689 M	▲	$558 M	▼
Total Trade	$623 M	▲	$548 M	▼	$502 M	▼	$725 M	▲	$757 M	▲	$721 M	▼	$748 M	▲	$987 M	▲	$932 M	▲	$739 M	▼
Note: All values are in million U.S. dollars.

== See also ==
- Pakistanis in South Africa
  - Memons in South Africa
