= Pakistan–Spain relations =

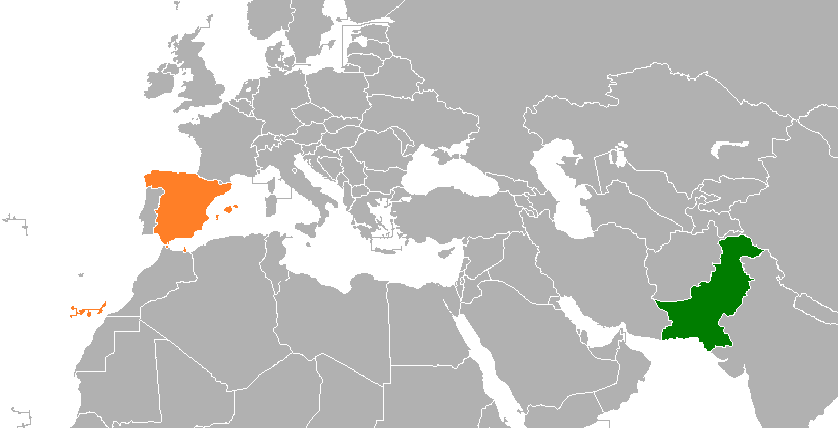
- Pakistan: Spain

Spain and Pakistan have diplomatic and bilateral relations. They enjoy extremely cordial and friendly ties.

== History ==
After the Partition of India in 1947, the Spanish city of Ceuta received a substantial influx of Sindhi Hindus from current-day Pakistan.

Even though diplomatic relations between both countries were established relatively early after the independence of Pakistan, they lacked in real substance for quite a while. According to documentation from the Spanish Ministry of Foreign Affairs, they date from 17 September 1951.

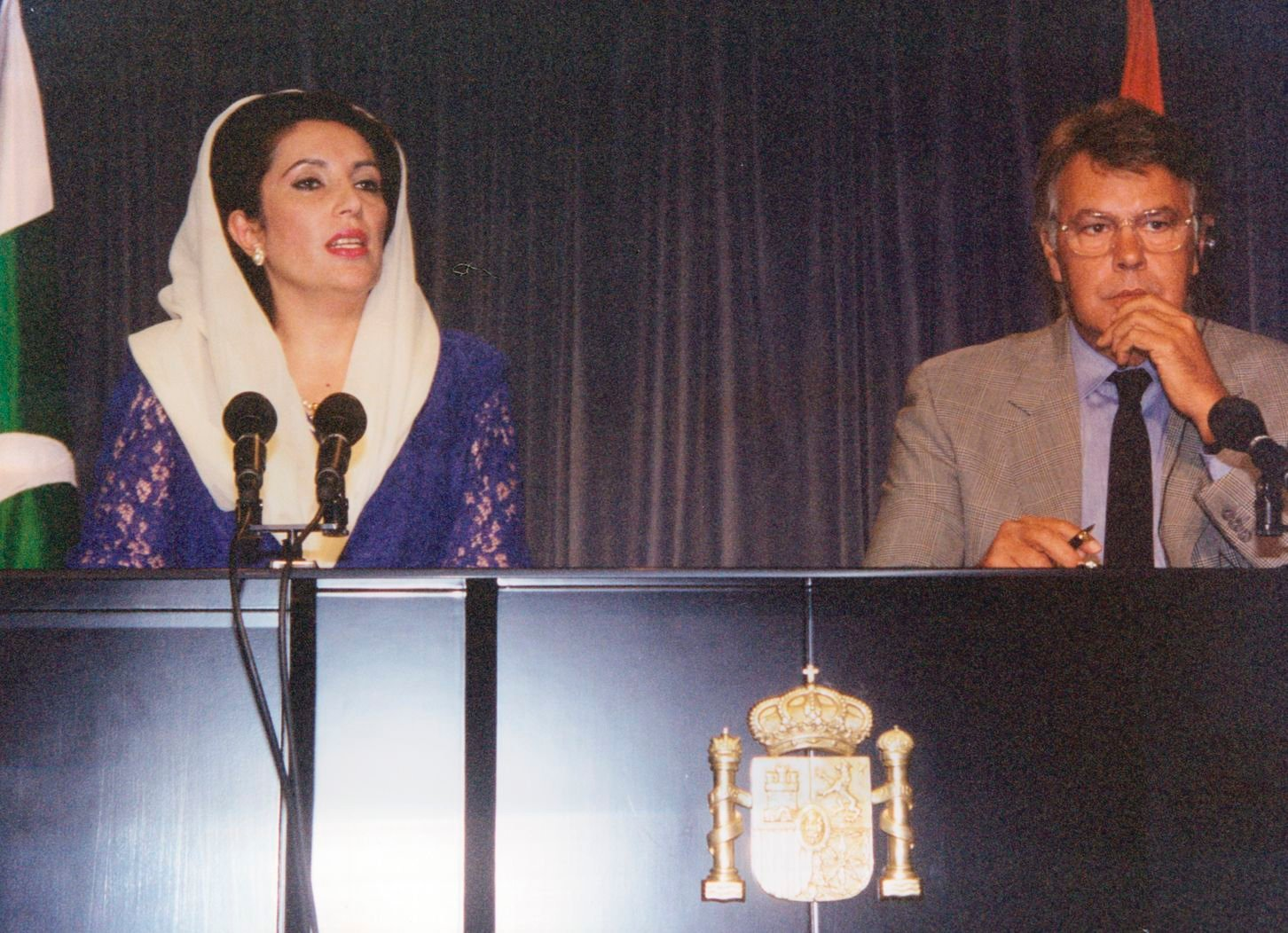
Pakistani and Spanish prime ministers Benazir Bhutto and Felipe González during a press conference in 1994 in Madrid

Pakistani prime minister Benazir Bhutto made an official visit to Spain in 1994. During her mandate as prime minister, a Bilateral Agreement for the Promotion and Reciprocal Protection of Investments and a Memorandum of Understanding on Financial Cooperation were signed in 1995.

Spain, particularly Catalonia, received a substantial influx of immigrants from Pakistan in the early 2000s.

Pakistan President Pervez Musharraf made an official visit to Spain in April 2007, visiting Madrid and Córdoba and meeting Spanish prime minister José Luis Rodríguez Zapatero and king Juan Carlos I. Prime minister Yousaf Raza Gillani made an official visit in June 2010, signing an agreement to remove double taxation.

As of 2017, the volume of trade between Pakistan and Spain stood at $1.1 billion, of which approximately $700 million was in Pakistan's favour.

As of 2021 the ambassador of Pakistan to Spain was Rafat Mahdi, Ambassador Extraordinary and Plenipotentiary.

In September 2021, José Manuel Albares made an official visit to Pakistan, the first one by a Spanish foreign minister, seeking to meet prime minister Imran Khan, foreign minister Shah Mahmood Qureshi and the Pakistani Army's Chief of Staff Qamar Javed Bajwa. He intended to somehow secure safe ways out of Afghanistan for the remaining Afghan collaborators with Spain in the wake of the Taliban takeover of the country.

== Resident diplomatic missions ==
- Pakistan has an embassy in Madrid and a consulate-general in Barcelona.
- Spain has an embassy in Islamabad.

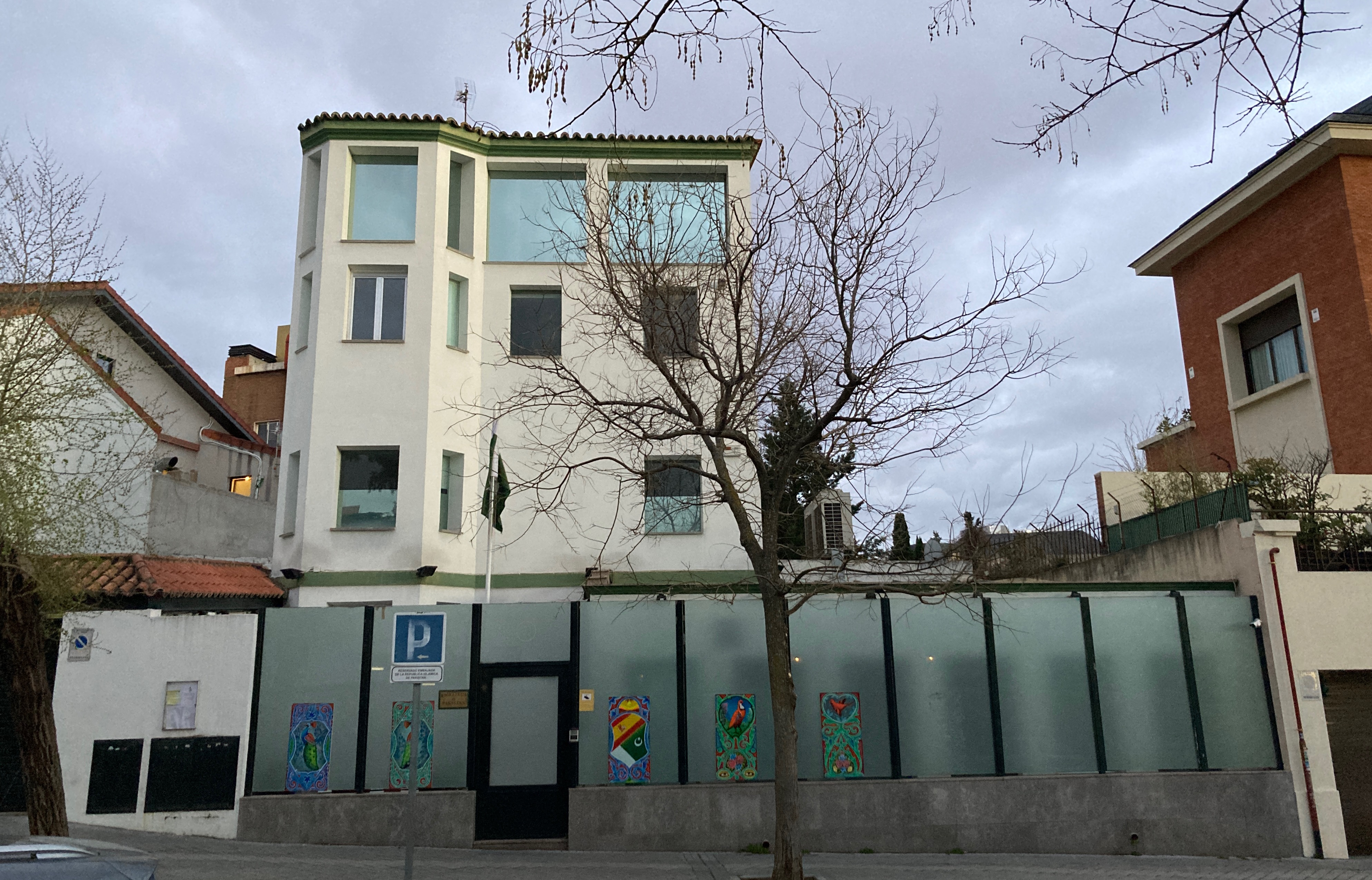
Embassy of Pakistan in Madrid

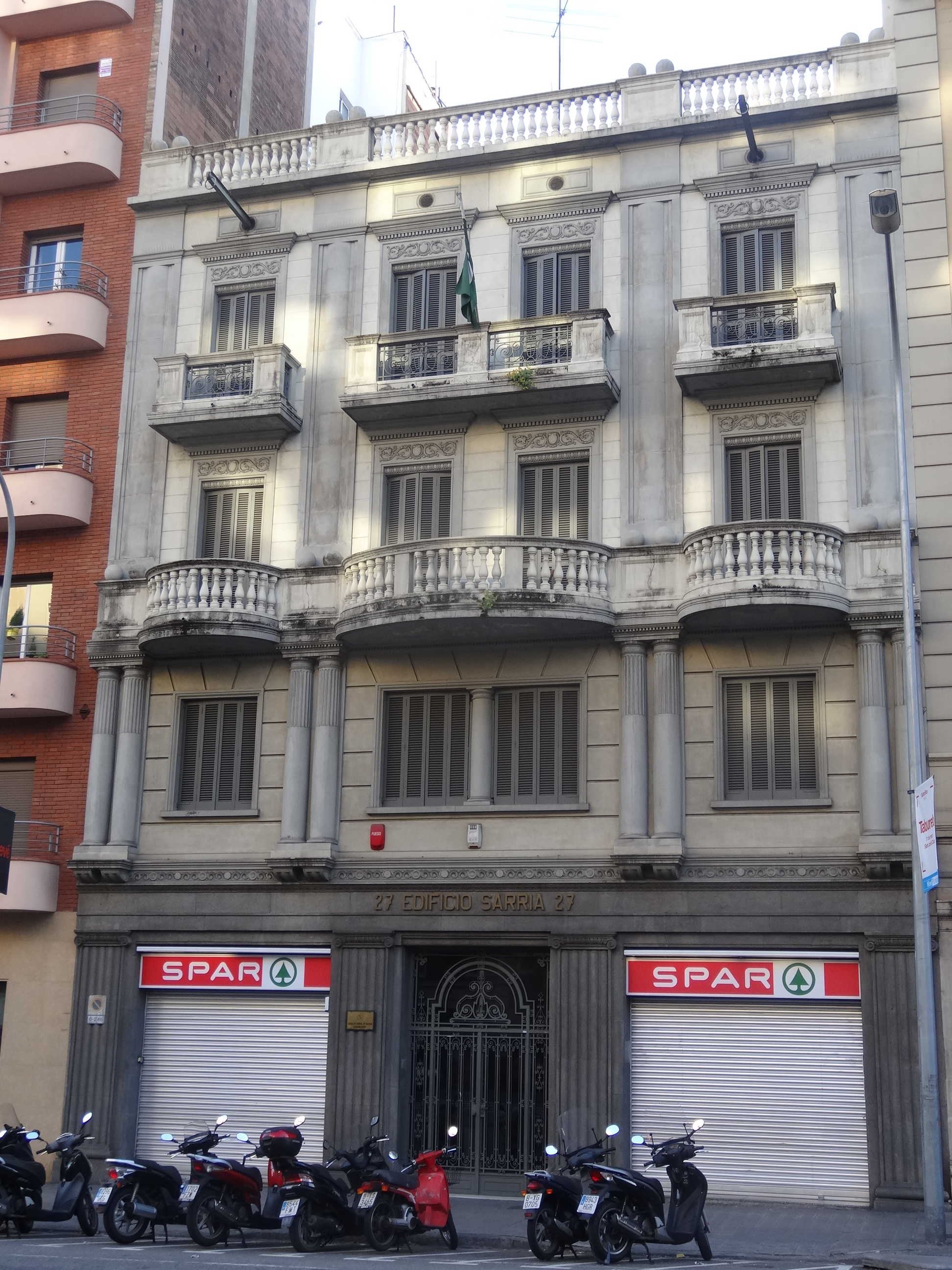
Consulate-General of Pakistan in Barcelona

== See also ==
- Foreign relations of Pakistan
- Foreign relations of Spain
- Pakistanis in Spain
