= Filipinos in Libya =

Total population
- 2,300 (2020)

Regions with significant populations
- Tripoli, Benghazi

Languages
- Tagalog, English and Arabic

Religion
- Roman Catholicism · Islam · Buddhism

Related ethnic groups
- Filipino people, Overseas Filipinos

Filipinos in Libya consist of migrant workers in the construction, medical, and tourism sectors, as well as their children. From 5,000 people in 2003, the population had grown to 7,913 people by 2006; men outnumbered women by roughly two-to-one. During the SARS outbreak in 2003, Libyan authorities banned Filipinos from travelling to the country, causing 700 workers to lose jobs they had arranged. Since 2005, the Philippine embassy has sponsored annual get-togethers for Filipino workers in the country in an attempt to foster a greater spirit of community among them. Filipinos working in Libya who bring their children with them are served by a school set up specifically for Filipinos, the Philippine Community School. 794 Filipino children lived in Libya as of 2006.

== See also ==
- Libya–Philippines relations
- Filipino diaspora
- Demographics of Libya
