= Pakistanis in Spain =

Pakistanis in Spain Pakistaníes en España
Total population
- 135.696 (2025)

Regions with significant populations
- Barcelona (especially El Raval)

Languages
- Punjabi, Urdu, English, other languages of Pakistan; Spanish

Religion
- Islam

Related ethnic groups
- Pakistani diaspora

Pakistanis in Spain form one of the country's larger migrant communities. In 2025 there were 135.696 Pakistanis people living in Spain.

== Migration history ==
Pakistanis began settling in Spain, mainly in the city center of Barcelona, as early as the 1970s, and most Pakistanis in Spain still reside there However, it took until November 2006 for the Pakistani government to approve plans to open a consulate there. They primarily trace their origins to the province of Punjab. Migrants largely consist of men; according to Spain's Instituto Nacional de Estadística (INE), only 13% are women. There are various conflicting data regarding the size of their community. 2004 figures from Pakistan's Ministry of Labour, Manpower, and Overseas Pakistanis show just 2,000 Pakistanis in Spain, which would make them the 15th-largest Pakistani community in Europe, or just 0.2% of the total number of Pakistanis in Europe. In contrast, the INE gave a figure for the year 2009 of more than twenty-six times that, 53,691, which represented growth of 27.5% over the 2007 figure of 42,105. Finally, some media reports around 2007 and 2008 give a figure of 70,000.

== Employment ==
Common areas of employment among the Pakistanis in Barcelona include in agriculture, as skilled tradespersons such as mechanics, carpenters, or welders, and in construction. A small proportion are engaged in the liberal professions, mainly medicine, law, and engineering. About four-tenths also run their own businesses. Grocery stores, butchers' shops, clothing stores, mobile phone shops, and discount shops are some of the more common types of businesses. The first halal butcher's shop in Barcelona was opened in 1983 by a Pakistani businessman. About half remit money to their families in Pakistan.

== Language ==
Punjabi is the most common first language among Pakistanis in Spain, reported by 63.6% of one survey group in Barcelona. The national language Urdu is also widely spoken, but very few have it as their first language. In the same survey, 95.4% stated that they could speak at least some Spanish, and 54.6% could also speak English; 12.9% also claimed some knowledge of Catalan, the language spoken in Barcelona where much of the Pakistani population in Spain lives.

== Religion ==
Islam is by far the most common religion among Pakistanis in Spain, and serves as an important marker of identity and community belonging. In Solé Aubia and Rodríguez Roca's 2005 study, every single one of their 280 interviewees stated that he or she was a Muslim; of them, 82.5% indicated that they continued to practise Islam normally, while 13.2% claimed that they would like to practise it properly but were prevented by various constraints, and 4.3% did not practise the religion because they did not want to and simply identified as being "culturally Muslim".

In Barcelona, the two mosques most frequented by Pakistanis are the Tariq ben Zyad Mosque and the Minhaj ul-Quran Mosque. The Tariq ben Zyad Mosque, on the calle Elisabets, was founded in 1981. It is named for Tariq ibn Ziyad, the general who led the Muslim conquest of Spain beginning in 711, and belongs to the Tablighi Jamaat movement. The Minhaj ul-Quran Mosque, founded in 1997, is, as its name indicates, part of the Minhaj-ul-Quran International movement.

== Community relations ==
The presence of Pakistanis in Spain was not much noted by mainstream society until late in the year 2000. That year, the government passed amnesty laws which would enable foreigners residing in Spain illegally to regularise their status; however, as a result of being unable to meet the requirements, a group of about a hundred, among them many Pakistanis, barricaded themselves in two churches in Barcelona and declared a hunger strike, which would last from 20 January to 8 March 2000 and would attract an additional seven hundred protestors during that time. Due to the limited knowledge of Spanish and Catalan languages among them, most Pakistanis do not have many personal relationships with Spaniards; in Barcelona, only 28.2% stated that they knew any Spaniards personally. There are few bloggers who translate the Spanish news in Urdu language and publish in there blog for the guidance of Urdu community in Spain. Nowadays Pakistani community is taking part in political activities in mainstream political parties. Few Pakistanis have intermarried with local people and have children in Barcelona.

== See also ==
- Pakistan–Spain relations
- Pakistani diaspora
- Immigration to Spain
- Spain national cricket team, many of whose players are of Pakistani origin.

== Bibliography ==
- Moreras Palenzuela, Jordi (January 2005), "¿Ravalistán? Islam y configuración comunitaria entre los paquistaníes en Barcelona" (PDF), Revista CIDOB d'Afers Internacionals (68)
- Solé Aubia, Montserrat; Rodríguez Roca, Josep (January 2005), "Pakistaníes en España: un estudio basado en el colectivo de la ciudad de Barcelona" (PDF), Revista CIDOB d'Afers Internacionals (68)
- Year Book, 2004-2005, Islamabad: Ministry of Labour, Manpower & Overseas Pakistanis, Government of Pakistan, 2005
- "Población extranjera por sexo, país de nacionalidad y edad (hasta 85 y más).", Revisión del Padrón municipal 2007. Datos a nivel nacional, comunidad autónoma y provincia., Spain: Instituto Nacional de Estadística, 2008
- "Población extranjera por sexo, país de nacionalidad y edad (hasta 85 y más).", Avance del Padrón a 1 de enero de 2009. Datos provisionales, Spain: Instituto Nacional de Estadística, 2009
