= Japan–Pakistan relations =

Bilateral relations between Pakistan and Japan

- Pakistan: Japan

Diplomatic mission
- Embassy of Pakistan, Tokyo: Embassy of Japan, Islamabad

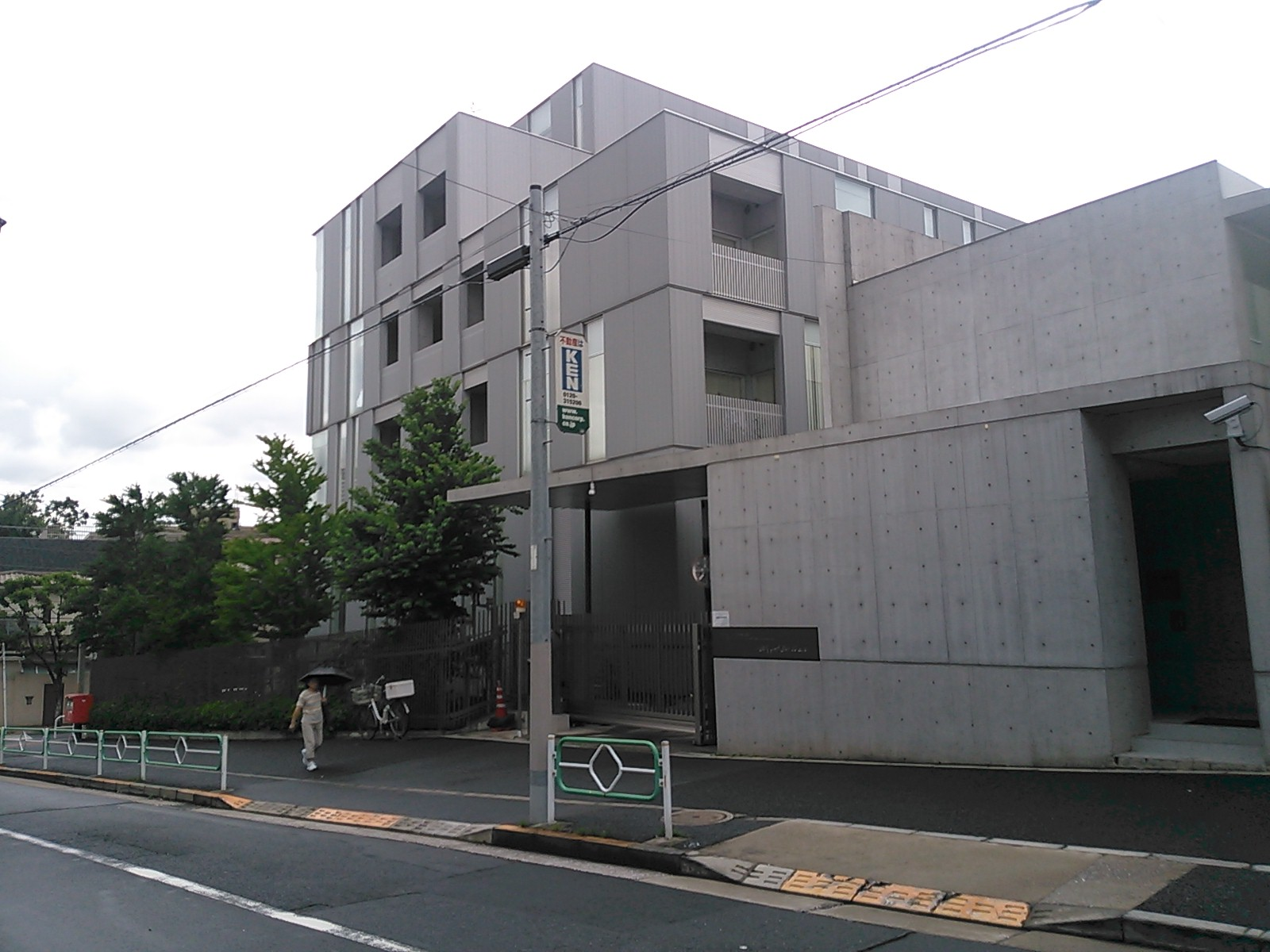
Embassy of Pakistan, Tokyo

Japan and Pakistan established bilateral relations on 28 April 1952. The Dominion of Pakistan had made significant efforts to lift the Allied occupation of Japan. During the Cold War, both countries were part of the Western Bloc. Pakistan played a major role in rebuilding the Japanese economy via mass exports and waiving war reparations owed to the country by Japan. Relations between Japan and Pakistan have generally remained stable, with the exception of the time period in which India and Pakistan were subject to Japanese sanctions due to their nuclear weapons tests in 1998. Relations have once again improved since then, with Pakistan receiving over ¥260 billion in grants and aid from Japan as well as around ¥3 billion in investments. As of 2022, there are 993 Japanese nationals residing in Pakistan whereas 22,118 Pakistani nationals are residing in Japan. About 20,000 Japanese tourists visited Pakistan between 2007-2008 and continue to express an interest in doing so, focusing on Pakistan's Buddhist sites. Pakistan is primarily represented through its embassy in Tokyo and Japan is represented through its embassy in Islamabad. As of 2015, bilateral trade between Japan and Pakistan stood at US$1.9 billion.

== Timeline ==
Japan was among the first nations to recognize Pakistan's sovereignty, doing so three days after the latter's independence on 14 August 1947. Diplomatic relations between the two were officially established in April 1952 following the end of the Allied occupation of Japan.

The newly founded Dominion of Pakistan played a significant role from 1947 to 1951 in efforts to lift the Allied occupation of Japan and restoring Japan's sovereignty. Pakistan was described by U.S. Secretary of State John Foster Dulles as the 'tower of strength' on the Treaty of San Francisco, a peace treaty signed between Japan and the Allies on 8 September 1951 in San Francisco. Unlike many other Asian countries, Pakistan waived war reparations from Japan to help the latter build its economy. Pakistan was also among the first few countries that ratified the Japanese peace treaty. Pakistan was a member of Southeast Asia Treaty Organization (SEATO).

Pakistan played a leading role in Japan's postwar economic revival in the 1950s by majorly exporting cotton and jute to Japan as textiles was practically the only industry allowed to continue under the Allied occupation. SCAP-Japan sent its first trade mission to Pakistan in May 1948, headed by R. Eaton. Two months later, Japan signed a trade agreement with Pakistan, which was also the first trade agreement signed by Japan with any country after the war. Much of Pakistan's export was on deferred payment as Japan was short of foreign exchange. In exchange for cotton and jute, Pakistan imported textile machinery from Japan. Therefore, a mutually beneficial trade relationship emerged between them. Furthermore, a Japanese trading liaison agency was established in Karachi in 1948, which also served as a diplomatic source for Japan after the war. Pakistan sent its first trade mission to Japan under Mirza Abul Isphahani in September 1948 to review the Japanese textile industry for Pakistan's benefit. Another SCAP-Japan trade mission, headed by E.B. Blatcheley, visited Pakistan in February 1949 and two more trade missions, led by B.W. Adams and A.B. Snell respectively, visited Pakistan to negotiate cotton and jute for the Japanese industry. These visits paved the way for many other trade delegations to Pakistan to enhance trade and to promote other economic activities between the two countries.

=== Mutual diplomacy ===
Before regular diplomatic relations were established between Pakistan and Japan, the trade liaison offices in Karachi and Tokyo, working since 1948, were the only sources of trade and diplomatic contacts. Both countries established regular diplomatic missions on 18 April 1952, just ten days after the ratification of the Japanese peace treaty. Therefore, Pakistan established diplomatic and trade contacts with Japan since 1948 – long before Japanese sovereignty was restored by the Allied Powers.

In order to meet the acute shortage of food in Japan caused after the war, Pakistan shipped 60,000 tons of rice through Nichimen vessels to Japan in 1952 and 1953 carrying the signboard ‘Donated Rice to the Emperor of Japan by the Government of Pakistan’. Such was the national sentiment between the two sides in the 1950s.

=== High level exchanges ===
Pakistan appointed Mian Ziauddin as its first Ambassador to Japan on 18 April 1952 and Japan Ambassador Kiyoshi Yamagata arrived in Karachi on 4 September 1952. Pakistan and Japan exchanged high level visits in April and May 1957. Pakistan's Prime Minister Hussain Shaheed Suharawardy was the first Asian leader to visit Japan in April 1957, which opened up the door for Japan to come back to Asia after World War II. Within a month in May 1957, Japanese Prime Minister Nobusuke Kishi undertook a visit to Pakistan, which was also the first ever visit by a Japanese Prime Minister to Asia after the end of World War II. However, they differed on the Kashmir dispute, One China policy, and the creation of an Asian Development Bank. Japan remained neutral on Kashmir and initially advocated a plebiscite in Kashmir but later changed its stance. Japan supported Taiwan against the People’s Republic of China (PRC) but Pakistan recognized the PRC as the sole and legitimate government of the people of China. Regarding the setting up of an Asian development bank, Pakistan wanted Japan to first establish and restore diplomatic relations with all Asian countries as they should not see an aggressive but a cooperative Japan. The mutual diplomacy, however, further encouraged the two sides to promote trading and economic ties, creating the environment for normalizing Japanese ties with other Asian nations such as China and the two Koreas. Moreover, Pakistan and Japan were important players in the US-led Cold War strategy in Asia — Pakistan in South Asia and Japan in North East Asia.

President Muhammad Ayub Khan paid a visit to Japan on 12–19 December 1960. The invitation was extended by Japanese Emperor Hirohito in February 1960, another unique aspect in their bilateral relations. Japan wanted to show that it had fully assimilated the spirit of the San Francisco treaty and was willing to boost relations with other Asian nations. For Pakistan, the visit was motivated by economic reasons. Moreover, the United States was encouraging cooperation between its two allies. Ayub's visit was the ‘grandest’ event ever seen in Japan those days. He was received by the Emperor – an extraordinary welcome as dignitaries were received by the prime minister. During this visit, Hirohito reportedly conferred the Order of the Chrysanthemum on Khan; in return Khan reportedly conferred the Nishan-e-Pakistan on Hirohito. Strategically important was Ayub's stopover at Okinawa, a US marine base, where US High Commissioner General Donald Prentice Booth welcomed a non-American and non-Japanese leader to the base for the first time and offered him a Guard of Honour. This showed an explicit trust between Japanese, Americans, and Pakistanis during the Cold War.

Following Ayub's visit to Japan, Prime Minister Hayato Ikeda visited Pakistan on 17–20 November 1961 as part of his Asian tour. He offered a loan of 20 million yen – Japan's first ever to Pakistan (besides India).

Crown Prince Akihito and Princess Michiko visited Pakistan on 23–29 January 1962, while war reparations and the normalization of diplomatic relations remained points of contention in Japan's relations with other Asian countries. In his welcome address the Emperor admired Japan–Pakistan ties: “Bonded not only by age of old relationship of culture and civilization but also by the modern ties of trade and cooperation, both Japan and Pakistan have first developed a unique identity of thought and we are emphatic in our belief that in between themselves both the governments and the people of these two countries are by virtue of their deep-rooted love for peace capable of exercising an irresistible influence on world opinion”.

=== Divergence ===
The One China policy continued to drag Pakistan's relations with Japan on a different path, affecting the civil aviation agreement as Japan did not grant landing rights to Pakistan International Airlines (PIA) to fly from inside China in the 1960s. China was supportive of PIA's proposed route but Japan did not agree, apparently under US pressure. Pakistan's civil aviation route proposal was actually a step toward Sino-Japanese rapprochement, which Japan did not appreciate, thus creating cracks in Japan–Pakistan relations and pushing more Pakistan towards China and mending fences with Eastern Bloc countries sourced by the Cold War activities.

=== East Pakistan debacle ===
Nevertheless, Pakistan remained high on the Japanese Official Development Assistance (ODA) program and received around 18 percent of assistance disbursed during 1961–71. War in the former East Pakistan and Japanese Red Cross's (Seki Juji) assistance to refugees who fled to Calcutta in India, however, created differences between Pakistan and Japan. Japan viewed the crisis in East Pakistan on the basis of Bengali nationalism and supported it. On the other hand, Japan did not support Vietnamese self-determination. Unlike with what Pakistan terms “the Kashmir dispute”, Japan did not adopt complete neutrality toward the issue of East Pakistan. Japanese political parties and social groups rendered support for the cause of the creation of Bangladesh. The Bangladesh Liberation War soon broke out in East Pakistan; Japan closed its Consulate-General in Dhaka and cut-off aid to Pakistan. Japan recognized Bangladesh within two months on 10 February 1972, inviting more Pakistan's criticism. Half of Japan's loans were consumed in East Pakistan and it refused to honor and payback those loans as Japan recognized Bangladesh before Pakistan made any decision.

=== Decline of Japanese interest ===
Moreover, Pakistan's anti-West stance in the 1970s under the dynamic leadership of Prime Minister Zulfikar Ali Bhutto and his industrial nationalization policy resulted in the decline of Pakistan-Japan diplomatic interaction and decreased the interest of Japan entrepreneurs towards Pakistan. No high level exchanges took place during this period. In spite of these strategic changes in Pakistan's foreign relations, Japan continued to be an important destination of Pakistan's trade. Furthermore, the normalization of China–Japan relations in the 1970s sent a positive message to promoting Japan–Pakistan ties, which were further strengthened during the Soviet occupation of Afghanistan in 1979. The Soviet invasion of Afghanistan renewed the moment of Japan–Pakistan ties once again, and high level exchanges were made. Japan saw a common danger in the presence of Soviet forces in Afghanistan, since Japan's energy lane passing through the Persian Gulf could have been jeopardized if the Soviets came to the warm-water ports in the Arabian Sea. Therefore, Japan extended full diplomatic and political support to Pakistan.

=== Renewal of ties ===
President General Muhammad Zia ul Haq visited Japan on 17–22 July 1983. Reciprocating, Prime Minister Yasuhiro Nakasone visited Pakistan on 30 April 3-May 1984, the first visit by a Japanese Minister in 23 years. His visit clearly indicated that Japan endorsed Pakistan's policy toward Afghanistan. This was the revival of the Cold War understandings. After the Soviet withdrawal from Afghanistan in 1989, Japan focused more on Pakistan's nuclear ambitions at a time when Pakistan just devised the ‘Look East policy’ with an aim to emulate the example of Japan and other East Asian countries to up-lift its economy after it was badly shattered during the war in Afghanistan.

=== Pakistan's East Policy after the Cold War ===
Pakistani prime minister Benazir Bhutto attended the state funeral of Hirohito in February 1989. Prime Minister Toshiki Kaifu visited Pakistan on 2–3 May 1990, the first by a Japanese leader after the demise of the Cold War. He also wanted to mediate in the complicated issues between Pakistan and India as Japan became assertive after the end of the crisis in Afghanistan. Another notable diplomatic visit was undertaken by President Ghulam Ishaq Khan to Japan in November 1990 to participate in the coronation ceremony of the Emperor.

Soon after becoming prime minister in November 1990, Prime Minister Muhammad Nawaz Sharif decided to visit Japan in July 1991, introducing a new dimension in Pakistan's foreign relations. The visit was, however, put off as a result of domestic upheaval. The visit was made on 16–19 December 1991, which was purely investment and business related. There was some controversy stirred up about Pakistan's nuclear program and Japan also linked up its aid policy with Pakistan's nuclear program and delayed its loan package until bilateral discussions were held on the Nuclear Proliferation Treaty (NPT). In fact, Japan followed the American lines on the nuclear issue after the withdrawal of Soviet forces in Afghanistan. Pakistan's motorway project between Lahore and Islamabad also invited Japanese criticism as the project was awarded to a South Korean multinational, Daewoo in 1991.

In an effort to consolidate further Pakistan-Japan ties, Prime Minister Benazir undertook an official visit to Japan in January 1996 to hold talks with her counterpart, Ryutaro Hashimoto, who eschewed from the complicated Pakistan-India issues especially after nuclear developments in South Asia. Japan wanted that both Pakistan and India should sign the anti-nuclear treaties. Following Pakistan's nuclear detonation on 28 May 1998, Japan placed economic sanctions on Pakistan.

=== War on Terror ===
Prime Minister Yoshiro Mori visited Pakistan on 20–21 August 2000, which was a diplomatic breakthrough in Pakistan-Japan relations after the nuclear blast. The 9/11 events put additional security and economic pressure on Pakistan. The event helped converge Pakistan-Japan security linkages once again like the renewal of their cooperation during the Afghan war. Japan realized the importance of Pakistan to drive the Taliban out from Kabul when the International Conference on Reconstruction was held in Tokyo on 21–11 January 2002.

President General Pervez Musharraf visited Japan on 12–15 March 2002. The visit was heavily loaded with the task related to combating terrorism in Afghanistan. Pakistan joined Japan's Operation Enduring Freedom – Maritime Interdiction Operation (OEF-MIO), aiming at combating terrorists in the Indian Ocean. Under the operation, Pakistan received fuel and fresh-water facility from Japanese vessels up to January 2010 besides the vessels of other 26 allied countries. The mission was scrapped as domestic differences rose high in Japan.

Prime Minister Junichiro Koizumi visited Pakistan on 30 April-1 May 2005. On the economic side, a major breakthrough made with regard to the resumption of Japanese new yen loan assistance to Pakistan. In response to Koizumi's visit to Pakistan, Prime Minister Shoukat Aziz paid a visit to Japan on 8–11 August 2005. Therefore, Pakistan toed a complicated alliance with Japan from 1951 through to 2010 with many ups and downs and setbacks.

=== 2022 Pakistan floods ===
After the 2022 Pakistan floods in September 2022, Japan provided US$ 7 million in emergency assistance and sent urgent humanitarian aid to Pakistan including tents and plastic sheets through Japan International Cooperation Agency (JICA).

== Issues ==
=== Illegal immigration ===
In January 2024, 17 Pakistanis entered Japan posing as football players and subsequently disappeared, marking an early instance of using fake sports teams for illegal migration. In June 2025, a group of 22 Pakistanis attempting to enter Japan under similar pretenses were detained and deported from Osaka’s Kansai Airport after failing to prove their membership in a football team. The case represented the first known organized case of illegal migration from Pakistan to Japan involving forged documents from the Pakistan Football Federation. Migrants reportedly paid smugglers $15,000 each to obtain visas through the Japanese Embassy in Islamabad. Experts have noted that this method demonstrates increasing sophistication in human smuggling tactics as traditional European routes become more difficult to access.

Tahir Naeem Malik, a professor at the National University of Modern Languages in Islamabad, stated that Japan has emerged as a new destination for illegal migration from Pakistan due to its "demand for human resources."

=== Illegal Mosque Inauguration ===
In June 2026, a mosque that was being constructed from October 2024 in Kawagoe, Saitama Prefecture, was scheduled for demolition after there was no application submitted and no permission was granted, with the land-ownership being linked to a Pakistan based company. The mosque was reportedly inaugurated by Pakistan Ambassador to Japan Abdul Hameed in April 2026, with the Pakistan Embassy clarifying that the acceptance of invitation was based on the information that all necessary permits were obtained.

== Economic relations ==
In 1949, Pakistan's exports to Japan increased to $14.9 million.

== See also ==
- Foreign relations of Japan
- Foreign relations of Pakistan
- Pakistanis in Japan
