= Pakistanis in Japan =

Total population
- 34,911 (in December, 2025)

Languages
- Japanese, English, various languages of Pakistan

Religion
- Islam

Related ethnic groups
- Pakistani diaspora

Pakistanis in Japan (在日パキスタン人, Zainichi Pakisutanjin) form the country's third-largest community of immigrants from a Muslim-majority country, trailing only the Indonesian community and Bangladeshi community. As of December 2025, official statistics showed 34,911 registered foreigners of Pakistani origin living in the country.

== Migration history ==
As early as 1950, only three years after the independence of Pakistan in 1947 which created the Pakistani state, there were recorded to be four Pakistanis living in Japan.

=== Illegal immigration ===
Pakistani citizens once enjoyed the privilege of short-term visa-free entry to Japan, but when controversy arose in Japanese society over illegal foreign workers, the Japanese government revoked this privilege. With little chance of acquiring a work visa or even permission to enter the country, Pakistanis paid as much as ¥300,000 to people smugglers in the late 1980s and early 1990s to enter the country. According to Japanese government statistics, the number of Pakistanis illegally residing in Japan peaked in 1992 at 8,056 individuals and declined after that. However, Pakistani sources suggest that as late as 1999, the total population of Pakistanis was 25,000 and still included a significant number of illegal immigrants. Some Pakistanis were able to obtain legal resident status by finding Japanese spouses.

In recent years, Pakistan witnessed a shift in irregular migration trends, with Japan emerging as a new destination driven by economic hardship and increasingly creative smuggling tactics. A notable example involved Pakistani migrants posing as football players—first in January 2024, when 17 individuals disappeared after entering Japan, and again in June 2025, when 22 were deported from Osaka after failing to prove their team affiliation. Pakistani authorities later arrested the alleged mastermind behind the operation, which relied on forged documents from the Pakistan Football Federation and payments of around $15,000 per migrant. “Japan emerged as a new destination for illegal migration from Pakistan due to its demand for human resources,” said Tahir Naeem Malik, a professor at the National University of Modern Languages in Islamabad. Analysts noted that the case reflected a growing sophistication in human smuggling methods in response to stricter enforcement.

== Demographics ==
Pakistan festival in Ueno Park, Tokyo

According to 2008 Japanese government figures, 19.9% of registered Pakistanis lived in Saitama, 17.8% in Tokyo, 12.3% in Kanagawa, 10.4% in Aichi, 8.98% in Chiba, 7.59% in Gunma, 6.02% in Ibaraki, 4.44% in Tochigi, 4.21% in Toyama, 3.27% in Shizuoka and the remaining 4.98% in other prefectures of Japan.

== Business and employment ==
Many Pakistanis in Japan run used car export businesses. This trend was believed to have begun in the late 1970s, when one Pakistani working in Japan sent a car back to his homeland. The potential for doing business in used cars also attracted more Pakistanis to come to Japan in the 1990s.

== Religion ==
The number of Muslims in Japan grew rapidly in the mid-1980 during the bubble economy. At that time young men from Muslim countries including Pakistan, Bangladesh, and Iran came to Japan and worked in small businesses or factories which experienced labor shortages. But when the controversy over illegal foreign workers began, the Japanese government halted entry on short-term visits without a visa for citizens of Pakistan, Bangladesh and Iran. Following the collapse of the Japanese asset price bubble in 1990, a number of Muslims acquired resident status, and some obtained legal residence in Japan by marrying Japanese women. Muslim families live and work with Japanese and send their children to Japanese schools.

== Notable people ==
- Hussain Shah, professional boxer, represented Pakistan in 1988 Seoul Olympics & won a bronze medal, moved to Japan to become a boxing coach afterwards.
- Shah Hussain Shah, son of Hussain Shah, judoka, represented Pakistan at Rio Olympics in 2016

== See also ==
- Japan–Pakistan relations
- Pakistani diaspora
- Immigration to Japan
