= Germany–Pakistan relations =

- Pakistan: Germany

Diplomatic mission
- Embassy of Germany, Islamabad: Embassy of Pakistan, Berlin

Envoy
- Bernhard Schlagheck: Jauhar Saleem

Germany–Pakistan relations are the bilateral relations between the Federal Republic of Germany and the Islamic Republic of Pakistan. The two states have established diplomatic relations in the 1950s, with a focus on social, educational and economic development. Despite strong co-operation and historical ties, the two nations have experienced growing tensions, primarily due to disagreements and differing policies regarding the War in Afghanistan, including as the post-2014 drawdown and 2021 withdrawal of United States-led coalition troops. However, Germany remains one of Pakistan's largest trading partners.

There are approximately 140,000 Pakistanis living in Germany according to official estimates in 2022.

== History ==
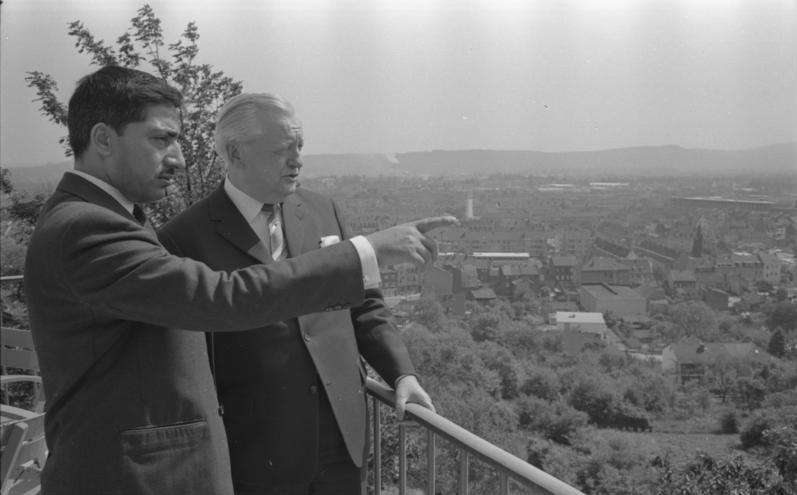
State secretaries of the two countries during a reception in Bonn, 1964

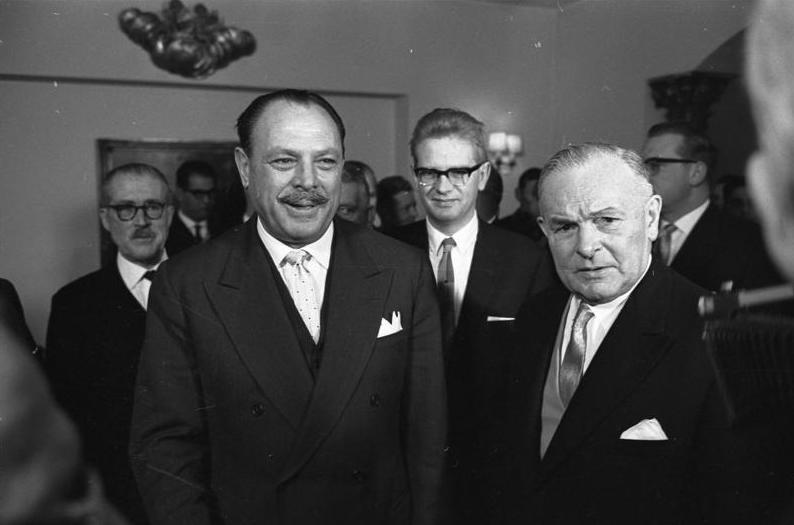
Ayub Khan in Germany on January 22, 1961

=== Relations during cold war:1950s–1990s ===
The bilateral relationships were succeeded by historical relations in the 1940s, during the British Raj, and finally restored in the 1950s after the establishment of both the countries in the late 1940s. Both, East and West, Germany had tilted toward forming alliance with India in the 1950s.

Although Pakistan's relations with West-Germany was relatively healthy and based on mutual cooperation; the relations with East-Germany were deteriorated. In contrast, East-Germany maintained strong relations with East-Pakistan in the 1950s.

In 1961, President Ayub Khan paid a first state visit to West Germany, meeting with German president Heinrich Lübke and Chancellor Konrad Adenauer. During this time, Germany partnered with Pakistan to launched industrial development program; hence becoming one of the first economic partners of Germany.

In the 1960s, West Germany started a prolonged and heavy industrial programme to aid Pakistan in its industrialization growth. West Germany idealised Pakistan as "an example of successful development policy in the developing country.". Meanwhile, Pakistani and East Germany civil society started to produce friendly impulses: In 1968 a book exhibition focused on the GDR was organised in Karachi and the Leipzig Trade fair added an office which was headed by a Pakistani. The following year was the beginning of a series of foundations of Pakistan-GDR Friendship Societies.

Although, Germany retained neutrality policy during the 1971 war of India and Pakistan; East Germany became the third country in the world, and the first country in Europe, to recognise Bangladesh officially in 1972 after it gained independence in 1971. This was only mildly surprising, since the GDR's government had shown unequivocal support for the Indian-backed separatists in the Awami League as the conflict played out. Later in the 1970s, Pakistan normalised its relations with East-Germany and Soviet bloc. In January 1973, the Embassy of the GDR in Pakistan opened its doors under the chargé d'affaires Walter Schmidt, who was replaced the following April by the first regular ambassador, Hans Maretzki. A few weeks before, in the beginning of April, Pakistan had opened its embassy in East Berlin; Jamshed K.A. Marker, the former ambassador in Ottawa, was its first ambassador.

== Cultural relations ==
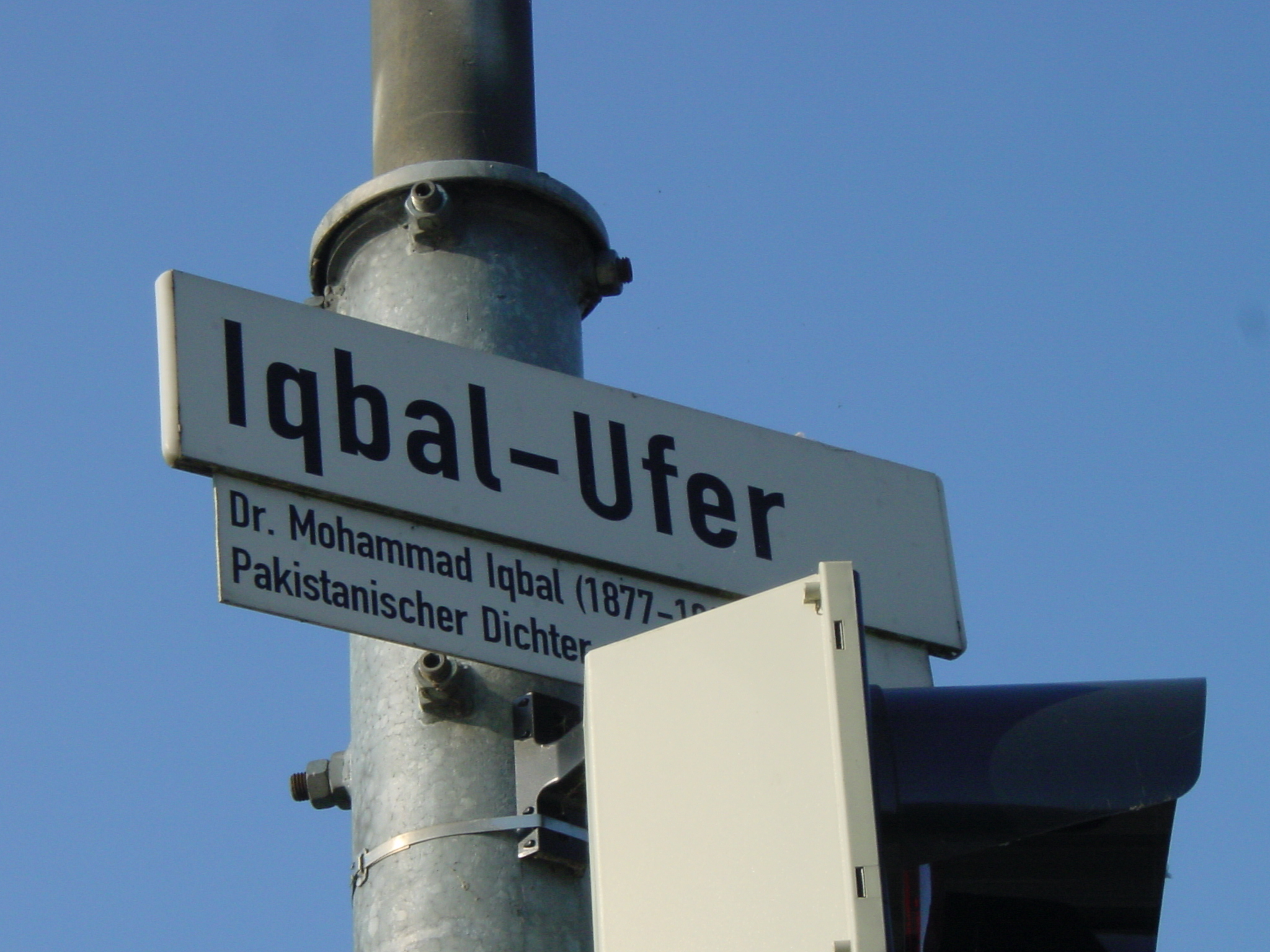
Street named in Allama Iqbal' s honour in Heidelberg, Germany.

Since they established diplomatic relations, Germany and Pakistan have both enjoyed extremely closed and cordial relationships. Before the re-unification of Germany, Pakistan maintained warm and cordial relationships with both sides. There is an underpass in Karachi named Schön circle underpass.

=== Archaeology ===
German archaeologists have been active in Pakistan for decades. Since 1979, for example, the project Rock Carvings and Inscriptions along the Karakorum Highway has been conducted with the support of the Heidelberg Academy of Sciences and Humanities. German researchers regularly travel to Gilgit-Baltistan as part of this project.

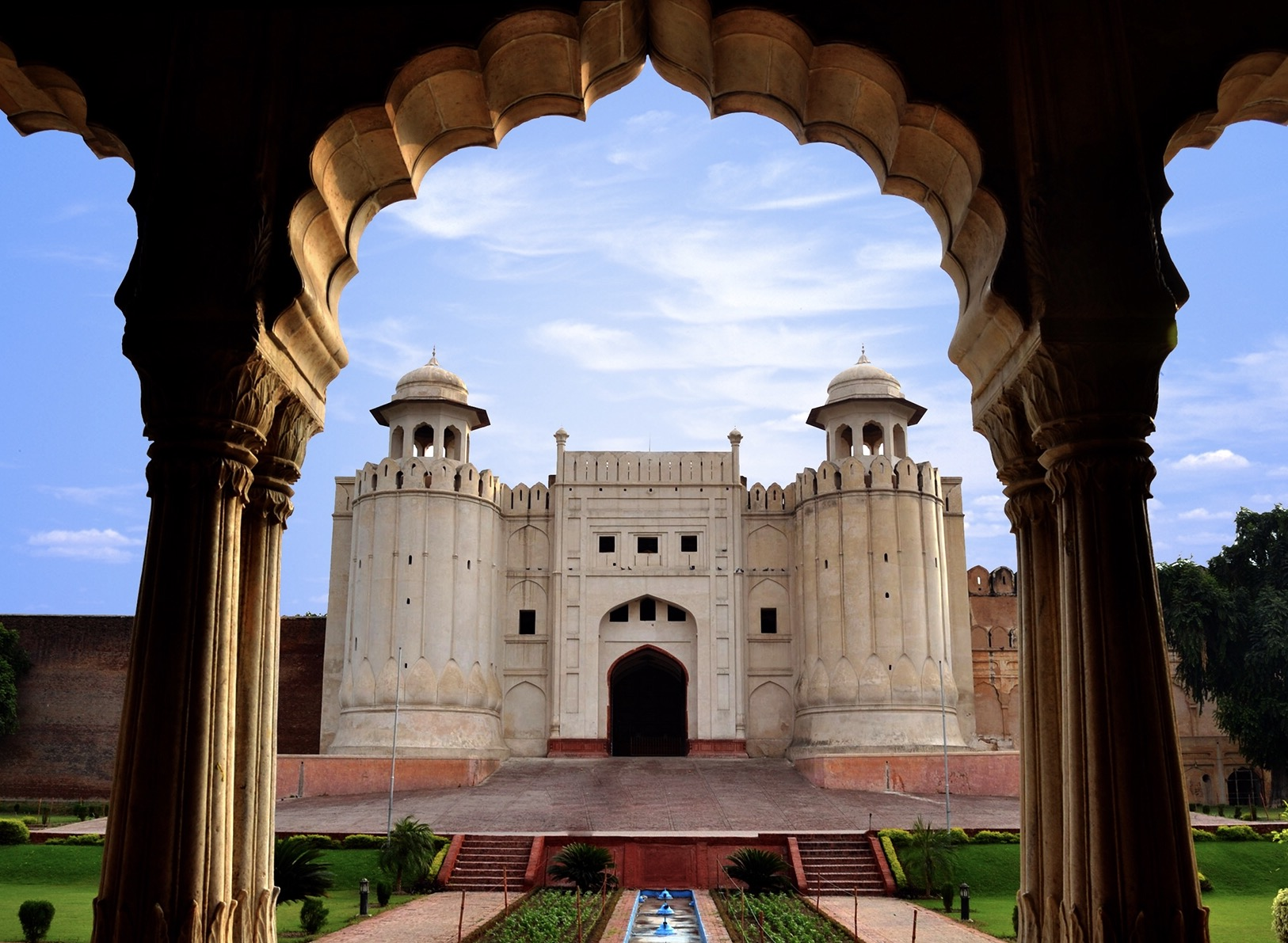
Germany assisted in restoration of Lahore Fort

For a number of years, the Federal Foreign Office has been funding cultural preservation projects in Pakistan. The main projects in recent years include the restoration of the Lahore Fort frescoes and a historical Amburiq Mosque in Gulabpur, Baltistan. In 2010 and 2011, the Federal Foreign Office provided funding to renovate and restore traditional residential buildings in Lahore's historical Old City in cooperation with the Aga Khan Foundation (AKF). The two projects received the UNESCO Asia-Pacific Award for Cultural Heritage Conservation in 2010 and 2014, respectively. Since 2017, a project has been underway to restore part of the Lahore Fort frescoes – also in cooperation with the AKF. This project is scheduled to continue through 2018.

==== Goethe-Institut ====
The main institution promoting bilateral cultural relations is the Goethe-Institut in Karachi. In the building housing the Goethe-Institut, which is from the Bauhaus era and classified as a historical monument, numerous cultural events are held in addition to the language courses. Another institution active in cultural cooperation is the Goethe-Institut-affiliated Annemarie Schimmel House in Lahore, which also offers language courses and a cultural programme.

Among European languages, German has seen a steady rise in popularity in Pakistan, particularly as a language pursued for higher education opportunities. According to the head of the German Language Department at the National University of Modern Languages (NUML), enrollment in German-language courses had increased significantly as of 2018, with the number of students reportedly doubling since 2012 and reaching approximately 500 students per year. This growth has been attributed to factors such as Germany’s higher education policies toward international students, promotional and educational activities conducted by the Goethe-Institut, and the availability of tuition-free or low-cost higher education in Germany.

=== Broadcasting ===
There has long been close cooperation in training between German broadcaster Deutsche Welle (DW) and the Pakistan Broadcasting Corporation (PBC). Deutsche Welle has its own office in Islamabad.

== Economic relations ==
Pakistan was one of the first countries with which Germany began development cooperation. The German-Pakistan development partnership was launched in 1961, the year the Federal Ministry for Economic Cooperation and Development (BMZ) was founded.

With trade investment exceeding € 2.3 billion. Germany is now Pakistan's fourth largest trade partner.

Germany has provided a total of around 3 billion euros to Pakistan since 1961. That makes Germany the fourth largest bilateral donor.

German multinational companies based in Karachi mostly through franchise rights are:

- BASF (Chemicals)
- Audi (Automobile)
- BMW (Automobile)
- Daimler AG (Automotive)
- DB Schenker (Logistics)
- DHL (Courier)
- deugro (Industrial Project Logistics)
- Linde plc (Chemicals)
- Lufthansa Cargo (Cargo airline) (Not currently flying to Pakistan)
- Bayer (Pharmaceutical)
- Merck Group (Pharmaceutical)
- Metro Cash and Carry (Wholesale)
- Siemens (Conglomerate)

The following bilateral agreements are in place between Germany and The following bilateral agreements were set up between Germany and Pakistan:

- Air Transport Agreement
- Double Taxation Agreement
- Investment Protection and Promotion Agreement
- Framework Agreement on Technical and Financial Cooperation (as amended by the annual agreements on financial and technical cooperation)
- Agreement on Cooperation in Scientific Research and Technological Development

In the 1990s, Germany and Pakistan sought a business alliance, known as the Pakistan German Business Forum. It was formed in 1997 with the humble initiatives of the German ambassador to Pakistan. Commercial trade between Islamabad and Berlin has also been very essential in recent years, as Germany is Pakistan's fourth largest trade partner. In 2000, Germany became one of Pakistan's most important allies surrounding the war in North-West Pakistan between Pakistan and the Taliban. In recent years, the Germany—Pakistan trade and science relations have developed greatly with Germany investing in and trading with Pakistan. Germany is actively involved in Pakistan's socio-economic development and is an active member of the Friends of Democratic Pakistan Forum.

Pakistan and Germany also enjoy good economic relations. Germany is the sixth largest importer of Pakistan goods. Pakistan's main exports to Germany are textiles and leather goods, while Germany's main exports to Pakistan are machinery and chemical products. Furthermore, around 30 German companies are operating in Pakistan – not only large firms but also small and medium-sized enterprises.

In August 2014 German Ambassador in Pakistan Dr Cyrill Nunn informed Finance Minister Senator Ishaq Dar in order to foster economic energies German businessmen were launching 'Pakistan Gate' in Berlin on August 24, 2014, which would provide business contacts between the two countries.

Sajjad Khan is a board member at Porsche Group AG and technology expert, a Lufthansa First Class flyer too.

=== China–Pakistan Economic Corridor (CPEC) ===
In November 2018, Pakistan proposed China–Pakistan Economic Corridor (CPEC) partnership to Germany. Pakistan offered German companies to invest in the Special Economic Zones (SEZs) of CPEC, the landmark framework of regional connectivity seen as a game-changer for the region.

=== Business ===
==== Pakistan German Business Forum (PGBF) ====
In 1997, the Pakistan German Business Forum (PGBF) was founded. Since then it has been engaged in becoming a central instrument for the promotion and expansion of bilateral economic relations between Germany and Pakistan.

==== Generalized System of Preferences (GSP+) ====
In 2014, Pakistan was included in the European Union's Generalized System of Preferences (GSP+). This gives Pakistan's export sector better access to the European market for various products, in particular textiles. Within the EU, Germany had spoken in favour of admitting Pakistan to the system.

=== Trade and investment ===
Germany exports to Pakistan worth around 1.8 billion and imports from Pakistan 1.1 billion. It is Pakistan’s 4th largest export partner, trade amounted to $1.6 billion in 2021.

	2007		2008		2009		2010		2011		2012		2013		2014		2015		2016		2017	
Germany Exports	$1.25 B	▲	$1.37 B	▲	$1.1 B	▼	$995 M	▼	$1.09 B	▲	$1.05 B	▼	$1.06 B	▲	$1.09 B	▲	$1.13 B	▲	$1.21 B	▲	$1.29 B	▲
Pakistan Exports	$939 M	▲	$1.04 B	▲	$943 M	▼	$1.16 B	▲	$1.57 B	▲	$1.26 B	▼	$1.42 B	▲	$1.71 B	▲	$1.62 B	▼	$1.7 B	▲	$1.9 B	▲
Total Trade	$2.19 B	▲	$2.41 B	▲	$2.04 B	▼	$2.15 B	▲	$2.66 B	▲	$2.47 B	▼	$2.31 B	▼	$2.48 B	▲	$2.75 B	▲	$2.91 B	▲	$3.19 B	▲
Note: All values are in U.S. dollars.

=== Relief work ===
To mitigate the effects of the flood disaster in Pakistan in late summer 2014, the German Government provided a total of more than 6 million euros in assistance. In 2015 and 2016, the total amount of the federal budgetary allocations for humanitarian aid projects in Pakistan exceeded 11 million euros. The relief measures are implemented by German non-governmental organisations and international organisations such as the United Nations Refugee Agency and the World Food Programme.

== Energy ==
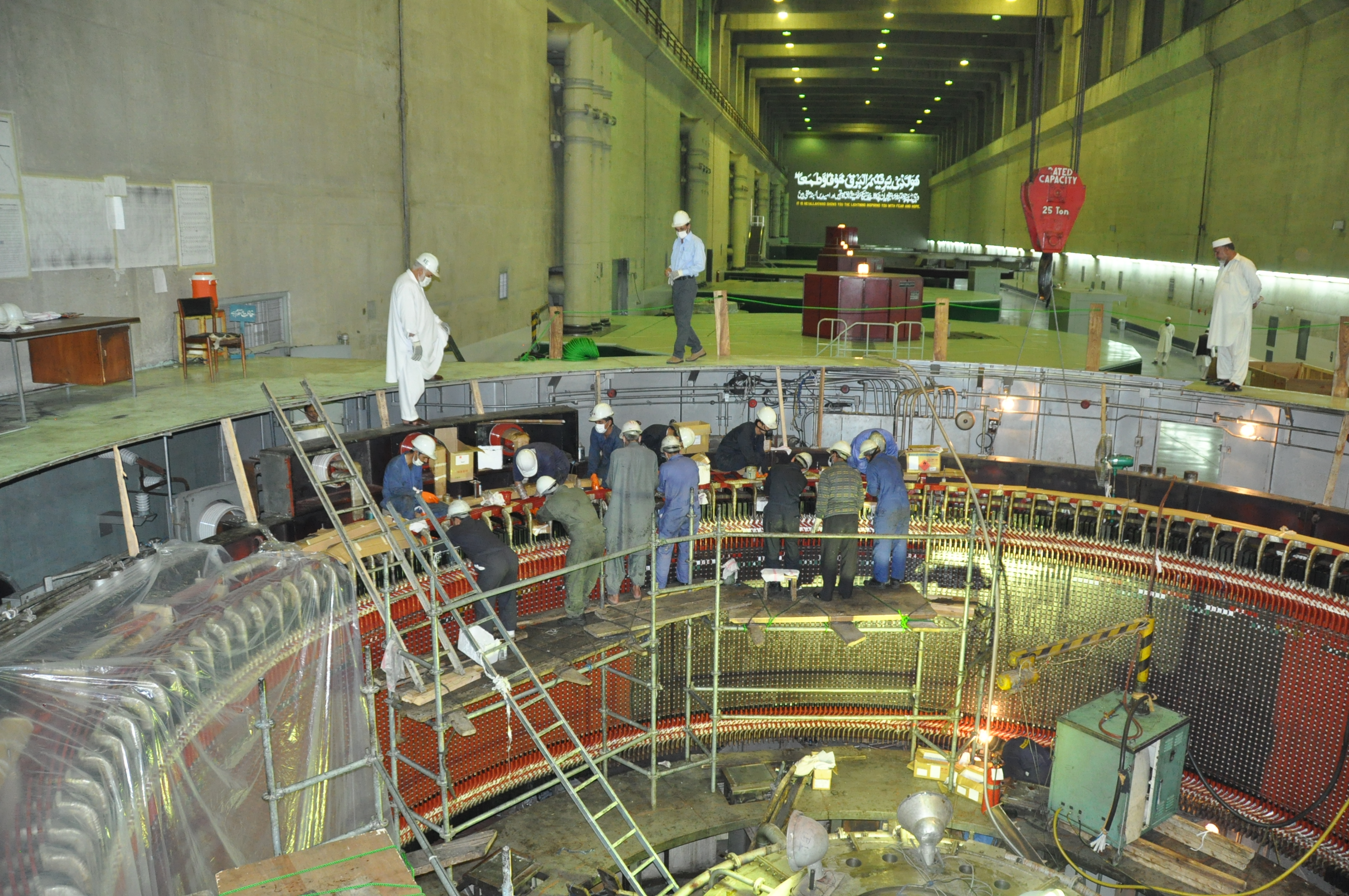
German bank assisted in construction of Tarbela Dam

Germany has been supporting Pakistan in energy sector for decades. Germany has helped to build a whole generation of hydro-electric power plants by providing reduced-interest loans. Further plants are either already under construction or are in the planning stage.

German commitment in Pakistan in recent years has already brought sustainable results in the development of hydropower. German expertise is widely recognised in the country. German bank KfW co-funded both Pakistan's hydropower projects Tarbela Dam and Ghazi-Barotha Hydropower Project. Together with European partners, KfW is currently involved in the construction of another two hydropower plants. KfW can also influence the structures of the Pakistani energy supply system. It played a role in instigating a reorganisation of the state-run energy utility WAPDA.

=== Pakistan-German Renewable Energy Forum (PGREF) ===
In November 2014, the German and Pakistan governments concluded an agreement to create a Pakistan-German Renewable Energy Forum (PGREF). The Forum is to be launched in Lahore in 2016. It will serve as a point of contact in Pakistan for the German energy sector, for associations and for non-governmental organisations. In the long term, it is to provide training and information and facilitate cooperation between partners from Germany and Pakistan.

== Educational relations ==
Germany is a popular study destination for young Pakistanis, with 32 cooperation arrangements between German and Pakistani universities. Every year, hundreds of Pakistani students and doctoral candidates go to Germany for their education. As of 2018, there are 4,100 Pakistani students and doctoral candidates in Germany.

Academic cooperation and research exchanges between Germany and Pakistan date back to the 1930s. Notably, in 1960, the Institute of Physics (IoP) was established at the University of Islamabad as part of this cooperation. German scientists collaborated with Pakistani scientists, contributing to the advancement of physics in Pakistan. Germany also supported Pakistan’s involvement in CERN projects and facilitated research opportunities for Pakistani physicists and mathematicians at DESY. During Ayub Khan's tenure as Chief Martial Law Administrator, strategic ties were established with both East and West Germany.

In 1907, Muhammad Iqbal, regarded as Pakistan's intellectual father, spent several months in Germany. In Heidelberg, he learned German and studied philosophy and literature. His poem "Darye Naika Ke Kinare Par" (Greeting to the Neckar) and a commemorative plaque in Heidelberg commemorate his time there. Iqbal described his stay in Heidelberg as "like a beautiful dream."

=== Vocational training ===
Germany is helping Pakistan to fundamentally reform its vocational training system in cooperation with the Netherlands, Norway and the EU. German Corporation for International Cooperation (GIZ) has been commissioned by the German Ministry for Economic Cooperation and Development (BMZ) to advise Pakistan's National Vocational and Technical Training Commission and vocational training agencies at provincial level on how vocational training can be better aligned with the needs of the labour market. More than 100 vocational careers advice and job centres have been established throughout the country. Uniform standards and material for examinations have been developed for nearly 60 vocational profiles in agriculture, energy and services; 87,000 young people have completed a training programme; 4,000 vocational training instructors have already been trained, with at least that many set to receive training in the near future.

==== Germany-Pakistan Training Initiative (GPATI) ====
In June 2013, 13 German multinational and Pakistani national companies on Thursday formally launched the Germany-Pakistan Training Initiative (GPATI), a new skills development project aiming at equipping young Pakistani men and women with employable skills.

=== NGO cooperation ===
The Friedrich Ebert Foundation, the Friedrich Naumann Foundation, the Heinrich Böll Foundation, the Hanns Seidel Foundation and the Konrad Adenauer Foundation have all seconded staff to Pakistan and run their own offices there, and in some cases have done so for decades. They support projects in areas including the strengthening of democratic institutions, human rights and the advancement of women, climate change, deradicalisation, regional cooperation and the media.

== Defence relations ==
During the 1970s, Zulfikar Ali Bhutto took extensive initiatives to strengthen Pakistan's ties with Germany. Under Bhutto, the military academies of each country signed a strategic and military training pact. German military officials and cadets frequently visit the Pakistan military academy and Pakistanis visit Germany in return. In the 1980s, the Germany—Pakistan relations saw a military alliance and supported each other while running clandestine operations against the Soviet Union's presence in the Democratic Republic of Afghanistan. At a later time and as a result Lufthansa and Pakistan International Airlines signed a memorandum of understanding with plans to code share in future.

The Pakistani Chief of Army Staff General Raheel Sharif visited Germany on the invitation of his counterpart German Inspector of the Army Lieutenant General Jörg Vollmer, from 19 June to 22 June 2016. On arrival at the Ministry of Defence, a contingent of German Army presented Guard of Honor to COAS followed by wreath-laying at Ministry of Defence War Memorial. Besides holding meeting with his German counterpart, the COAS also had detailed meetings with German Minister of Defence Ursula von der Leyen and German Foreign Minister.

== Perception on relations ==
In 2012, the relations had been down and cooled when Pakistan's police detained three alleged German intelligence agents near the Afghan border. All three agents were interrogated by the FIA agents before being deported from the country with "Persona non grata" after Germany loaded a protest.

=== Attack on Pakistani consulate by Afghan migrants ===
In July of 2024, a mob of Afghan protesters attacked the Pakistani consulate in Frankfurt. A few of the Afghans climbed the consulate premise and hurled stones at the building and attempted to vandalize the Pakistani flag.

The Pakistani government condemned the attack and criticized German authorities for failing to prevent the attack as required under international law. The German police stated that the protest was allowed as a form of expression. The Pakistani government criticized the German authorities for failing to inform the consulate of the demonstration. The German ambassador was summoned in Islamabad by the Pakistani government to lodge a formal protest. German police claimed to have arrested two of the culprits and seeking to find the rest. The ones who were caught were deported back to Afghanistan.

Separately, Germany has been stepping up its deportations of Afghan migrants deemed as troublesome as they are seen as a threat to German society.

=== Support for Terror Groups ===
In 2025 Germany turned down Pakistan’s request for AIP technology for its submarines due to its support for Lashkar-e-Taiba. Germany instead, sold this technology to India for the submarines of its own navy.

== Diplomatic relations ==
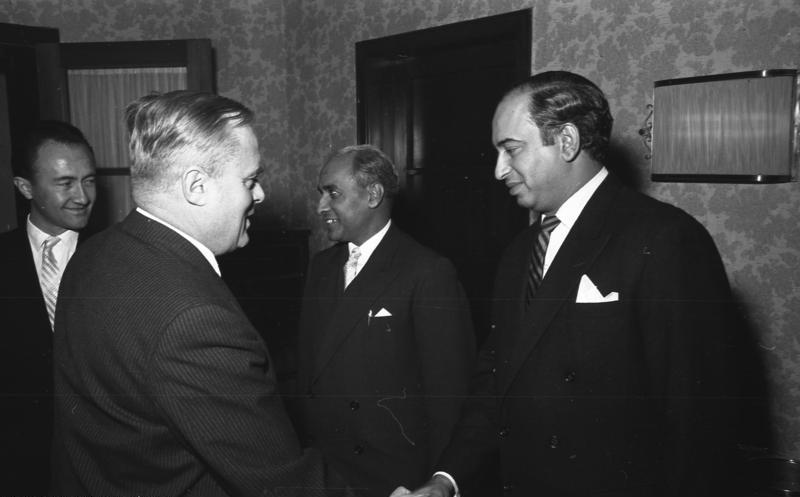
Bhutto meeting with German official.

=== Pak-Germany Strategic Dialogue ===
In January 2011, Germany and Pakistan agreed on initiating Pak-Germany Strategic Dialogue on yearly basis to enhance defense, economy, education, energy, investment and infrastructure. Four rounds of Strategic Dialogue have taken place with last one in November 2018, at Islamabad.

=== Embassies ===
- Germany: Germany has an embassy in Pakistan, specifically in Islamabad and has consulates-generals in Karachi, Lahore, Peshawar and Quetta;
- Pakistan: Pakistan is represented through an embassy in Berlin and a consulate-general in Frankfurt.

== See also ==
- Germans in Pakistan
- Pakistan–European Union relations
- Pakistanis in Germany
