= Libya–Philippines relations =

- Libya: Philippines

The Libya–Philippines relations refers to the bilateral relationship between Libya and the Republic of the Philippines. Libya has an embassy in Manila and the Philippines has an embassy in Tripoli.

== Gaddafi era ==
Libyan leader Muammar Gaddafi's foreign policy significantly covered the Philippines, particularly Mindanao. After the 1971 Manili massacre, claiming the lives of many Filipino Muslims in Cotabato, Gaddafi provided military aid to the secessionist group, Moro National Liberation Front (MNLF), and provided them shelter and training in Tripoli. In subsequent meetings of the Organization of Islamic Conference (OIC), Libya took the lead to discuss the issues being faced by Filipino Muslims. Libya also got support from its fellow OIC member, Malaysia, which at that time was experiencing diplomatic tension with Manila over the foiling of Operation Merdeka, a destabilisation program to encourage dissent on non-Malay ethnic groups on the Malaysian state of Sabah. In 1972 in Jeddah, Saudi Arabia, the OIC officially expressed for the first time its “serious concern for the plight of the Filipino Muslims.”

At the Fourth Islamic Conference in Benghazi in 1973, Libya took a strong initiative for the OIC to adopt a strong resolution against the Philippines expressing resolution expressing “deep concern over the reported repression and mass extermination of Muslims in Southern Philippines and (urging) the Philippine government to halt these operations immediately.” Indonesia, persuaded the OIC to put the issue of Filipino Muslims into the OIC's agenda.

Through Philippine president Ferdinand Marcos's diplomacy, the OIC soften its stance against the Philippines and took advantage of the MNLF's membership in the organization to start negotiations between the secessionist group and the Philippine government. Diplomatic relations between Libya and the Philippines were formally established in 1976 with the signing of a Joint Communique. An agreement was signed in 1976 in Tripoli which made the MNLF drop its secessionist goal in favor of autonomy. However the pact was short-lived due to President Marcos's insistence to hold a plebiscite to determine which province wanted to be part of the autonomous region. By 1978, the ceasefire was broken until the signing of the GRP-MNLF Peace Agreement in 1996.

In August 1986, in a 30-minute interview with Brazilian TV Bandeirantes in Tripoli, Muammar Gaddafi admitted that he supported Moro secessionists in Southern Philippines. Gaddafi was interviewed at his home in Tripoli, which was bombed by the United States in April.

== Libyan Civil War and post-Gaddafi era ==
The Philippines was hesitant to switch recognition from Muammar Gaddafi's government to the National Transitional Council(NTC) as the sole legitimate representative of Libya even as many governments, including the United States and the European Union, has already recognized the council. The Philippines' main concern was to ensure the safety of its Overseas Filipino Workers. About 10,000 overseas workers were repatriated from Libya while about 2,000 insisted on staying despite safety reasons.

The Philippine Department of Foreign Affairs, expressed support on the NTC on August 24, 2011, following the defection of the Libyan embassy in Manila to the NTC. The embassy changed Gaddafi's green flag to the current red-black-green tricolor flag on the same date. The NTC sent representatives to the Philippine embassy in Tripoli to assure the safe repatriation of Filipinos from Libya.

Finally, the Philippines officially recognized the NTC as the sole legitimate government of Libya over Muammar Gaddafi's government on August 30, 2011. The Philippines extended its gratitude to the Libyan people for keeping its overseas Filipinos safe amidst the conflict. The Philippine government also requested Libya to once again accept Filipino workers and hoped to help in rebuilding a new Libya "in the form of Filipino professionals in the construction, energy and medical fields," Newly instated Libyan President of the General National Congress of Libya, Mohammed Magariaf lauded the important contributions of Filipino nurses and medical workers in the Libyan society on October 22, 2012.

== Others ==
There are sizable community of Filipinos in Libya consist of migrant workers in the construction, medical, and tourism sectors, as well as their children. From 5,000 people in 2003, the population had grown to 7,913 people by 2006; men outnumbered women by roughly two-to-one. During the SARS outbreak in 2003, Libyan authorities banned Filipinos from travelling to the country, causing 700 workers to lose jobs they had arranged. Since 2005, the Philippine embassy has sponsored annual get-togethers for Filipino workers in the country in an attempt to foster a greater spirit of community among them. Filipinos working in Libya who bring their children with them are served by a school set up specifically for Filipinos, the Philippine Community School. 794 Filipino children lived in Libya as of 2006.
