= Italy–Pakistan relations =

- Pakistan: Italy

The term Italy–Pakistan relations refers to bilateral relations between the Republic of Italy and the Islamic Republic of Pakistan. The nations have cordial relations.

Italy is an active investor in Pakistan. Italy provided Pakistan US$100 million under the Pakistan Italian Debt for Development Swap Agreement to social development projects in health, education and sanitation, in Pakistan. The Italian government has agreed to provide a credit line equivalent to $10 billion for Italian investors willing to invest in Pakistan. Italy has also supported Pakistan's bid for free trade agreement between Pakistan and the EU.

There are over 150,000 Pakistanis living in Italy, mainly in the cities of Milan and Brescia, of whom a vast majority belong to the Punjab province of Pakistan. Pakistan has an embassy in Rome and a Consulate-General in Milan for representation, whilst Italy maintains an embassy in Islamabad, a Consulate-General in Karachi and an honorary consulate in Lahore. Italy has been a major participant in Pakistan's scientific contribution to the world, and both countries established the International Conference on Astrophysics and Relativity in 2011.

Italy favours a free trade agreement with Pakistan, within the context of the European Union.

== Triple Helix Association ==
Triple helix model of innovation, launched by Henry Etzkowitz and Loet Leydesdorff, began in 1996 when a workshop was organized in Amsterdam to discuss the Triple Helix model. It has been used as a lens through which evolving relationships between university, industry and government can be analyzed. Triple Helix Association was subsequently established in 2009 and headquartered in Rome, Italy as a non-for-profit, non- governmental association with scientific purpose and a global reach under a main scope is to advance the scientific knowledge and practical achievements related to all aspects of the interaction between academy-industry-government (Triple Helix) for fostering research, innovation, economic competitiveness and growth.

== THA South Asian Chapter ==
The Triple Helix Association - South Asian Chapter was headquartered in Pakistan at University of Management and Technology (Lahore) in a result of discussions and presentations made at THA conference held in Tomsk, Russia in September 2014. South Asia Triple Helix Association (SATHA) has been established to spur research, innovation economic growth and regional competitiveness in the region to cope the challenges of growing population and poverty. Among the major challenges of South Asian countries are the weak political, social and economic institutional base which has caused poverty and stagnation. SATHA through its knowledge based activities builds coordinated interactions among the suppliers and users of knowledge. SATHA facilitates the regional universities, industries and governments to articulate strategies for better performance through which more competitiveness, innovation and higher living standards can be achieved. SATHA works with the sub chapters of each country to ensure its regional objectives.

== SATHA Innovation Award for Pakistani Innovators ==
SATHA Innovation Award was established by South Asian Triple Helix (SATHA) for Pakistani innovators to encourage them for their extraordinary works (having substantial impact on human life) in the respective fields. Separate award programmes were launched in the provincial capitals of Punjab, Sindh, Khyber Pakhtunkhwa and Balochistan.

== Coronavirus crisis ==
In March 2020, the Italian ministry of foreign affairs reported Pakistan was sending 500,000 chloroquine tablets to help Italian patients with the coronavirus.

== Twin cities and towns ==
Pakistan and Italy have many sister cities and twin towns.

- (Pakistan) Multan and (Italy) Rome
- (Pakistan) Skardu and (Italy) Cortina

== See also ==
- Pakistanis in Italy
- Holy See – Pakistan relations
