= Pakistanis in Italy =

Total population
- 200,000 (estimate)

Regions with significant populations
- Milan · Brescia

Religion
- Majority: Islam

Related ethnic groups
- Pakistani diaspora, Punjabi diaspora

Pakistanis in Italy form one of Europe's larger Pakistani diaspora communities. Estimates for the number of Pakistanis living in Italy vary. Pakistan's Ministry of Foreign Affairs repeats the Italian government's 2003 figure of 30,500 individuals, while their embassy in Rome speculated to a reporter of Pakistani newspaper Dawn as early as 2002 that the number might have already reached as high as 50,000. Media reports in 2017 gave numbers higher than 130,000 .

Most of the workers are of Punjabi background with accounting for 72 percent share of migrants in 2016 and 76 percent in 2017.

According to the Italian ambassador to Pakistan, Andreas Ferrarese, as of February 2021, there are around 200,000 Pakistanis in Italy, of them 140,000 are documented.

== Cultural integration ==
A monthly Urdu-language magazine called Azad (which means "free" in Urdu) has been launched. It aims to bridge the two cultures by helping Pakistani immigrants who either cannot speak Italian or have limited interaction with the locals. It also helps Pakistanis to learn about Italy and its culture.

According to media commentator Ejaz Ahmad, himself a Pakistani with two decades of residence in Italy, roughly 10,000 Pakistani migrants have purchased homes in Italy, which he analyses as a signal of their intention to remain in the country.

== Services to Italy ==
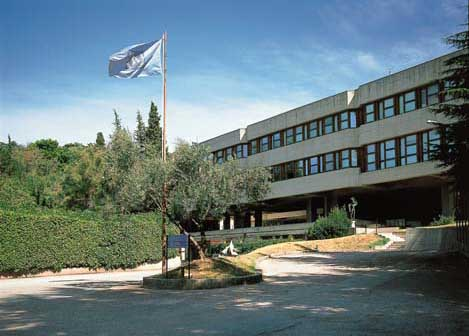
ICTP, founded in 1964 by Pakistani physicist and Nobel Laureate, Abdus Salam

The Abdus Salam International Centre for Theoretical Physics (ICTP) was founded in 1964 by Pakistani scientist and Nobel Laureate Abdus Salam. It operates under a tripartite agreement among the Italian Government, UNESCO, and International Atomic Energy Agency (IAEA). It is located near the Miramare Park, about 10 kilometres from the city of Trieste, Italy.

== Notable people ==
- Akhlaq Qureshi - Italian cricketer
- Prince Aly Khan - The Italian-born son of Aga Khan III

== See also ==
- Pakistani students
- Italy–Pakistan relations
