= Pakistanis in Germany =

Ethnic group in Germany

- Distribution of Pakistani citizens in Germany (2021)

Total population
- 140,000 (2022 official estimate)

Regions with significant populations
- Frankfurt am Main, Berlin and Hamburg

Languages
- German, Pashto, Urdu, Saraiki, Sindhi, Punjabi, English, Balochi

Religion
- Majority Islam Minority Christianity, Hinduism, Others

Related ethnic groups
- Overseas Pakistani, Indians in Germany, Chinese in Germany, Afghans in Germany, Iranians in Germany, Sinti
- The figure given above of Pakistanis in Germany includes only people holding a Pakistani passport. German citizens of Pakistani origin or descent are not included.

Pakistani-Germans refers to the community in Germany of Pakistani heritage or citizenship.

== History ==
There are 140,000 Germans that have a Pakistani migration background. Roughly every fifth Pakistani in Germany (21%) has been living in Germany for over 15 years prior to 2011. Just over 25% or around every fourth Pakistani living in Germany today came to Germany less than four years ago. Many young Pakistanis have come to Germany recently as students of science and technology in prestigious universities. The German government has established German Academic Exchange Service in Islamabad. These highly educated Pakistanis are serving in various sectors of the German economy.

In 2021, 2,055 Pakistanis were naturalized as German citizens. Almost a third of all Pakistanis in Germany live in Hesse. There are approximately 1900 Pakistanis living in the northern city-state of Hamburg, about 1500 in Frankfurt am Main and almost 1400 in Berlin and its suburbs. In 2009, the German government estimated the number of people of Pakistani descent residing in Germany at 76,173.

The tradition of Pakistanis coming to Germany for higher education was pioneered by the famous poet and philosopher Muhammad Iqbal. In 1907, Iqbal traveled to Germany to pursue a doctorate from the Faculty of Philosophy of the Ludwig-Maximilians-Universität München. Working under the supervision of Friedrich Hommel, Iqbal published a thesis entitled The Development of Metaphysics in Persia.

=== International students ===
The Government of Pakistan through its Higher Education Commission has sent hundreds of Pakistani researchers and scientists for training in German universities. Most major German universities have Pakistani student societies. Hundreds of institutes in Pakistan teach students German as their primary foreign language as part of an effort by Germany's top technical colleges to attract more Pakistani students.

A recent study by Germany's Federal Employment Agency concluded that Pakistanis have been the most successful at finding work in the EU country over the past couple of years.

== Religion ==
Most Pakistanis in Germany are Muslim, including majority Ahmadi Muslims, Sunnis, Shias and other sects. There are also many Hindus, Zoroastrians, and Sikhs, as well as a strong Christian community.

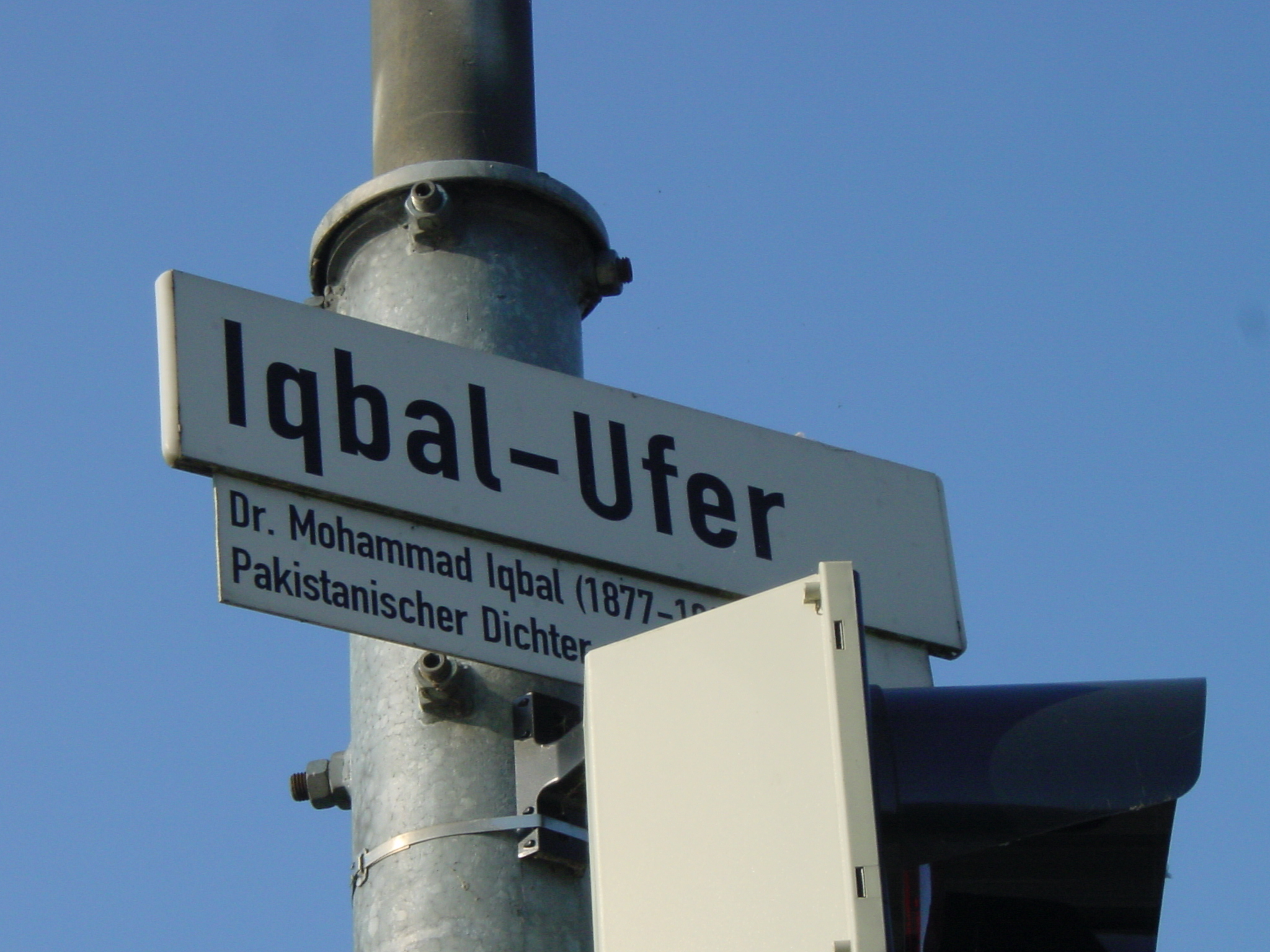
Street named in Muhammad Iqbal's honour in Heidelberg.

== Notable people ==
- Asifa Akhtar, researcher at the Max Planck Society, and Vice President of its Biology and Medicine Section
- Mojib Latif, Professor, meteorologist and oceanographer
- Jamal Malik, Professor of Islamic Studies and chair of Religious Studies, University of Erfurt, Germany.
- Atif Bashir, footballer (Turkish German mother and Pakistani British father)
- Hasnain Kazim, author and journalist, correspondent of the German news magazine DER SPIEGEL and SPIEGEL ONLINE.
- Yasmeen Ghauri, model born in Canada of mixed Pakistani and German descent
- Vaneeza Ahmad, Pakistani model, brought up in Germany
- Misbah Khan, Politician for Alliance 90/The Greens and since 2021 member of the German Bundestag.
- Abrar Hassan, Biker and Vlogger

== See also ==
- Demographics of Germany
- Pakistan-Germany relations
- Pakistanis
