= Foreign relations of Pakistan =

The Islamic Republic of Pakistan emerged as an independent country through the partition of India in August 1947 and was admitted as a United Nations member state in September 1947. It is currently the second-most populous country within the Muslim world, and is also the only Muslim-majority country openly in possession of nuclear weapons. The country shares land borders with India, Iran, Afghanistan, and China.

The country has extensive trade relations with the European Union and with several countries globally. As of 2026, Pakistan does not recognize Israel and its ties with India remain frozen since 2019.

From a geopolitical perspective, Pakistan's location is strategically important as it is situated at the crossroads of major maritime and land transit routes between the Middle East and South Asia, while also serving as a bridge between the Arabian Sea and the energy-rich regions of Central Asia. Since the partition of India, the Kashmir conflict has defined the India–Pakistan relationship: the two countries claim each other's zones of control in Kashmir, but are separated by a ceasefire boundary known as the Line of Control. Pakistan has close bilateral ties with China and the Muslim world, including Turkey, Azerbaijan, and the Gulf Arab countries. As a part of the First World during the Cold War, Pakistan cooperated with the United States to combat the global influence of the Soviet Union, though this relationship later became strained over the course of the war on terror. Pakistan is an active member of the Commonwealth of Nations, Organization of Islamic Cooperation, and the Shanghai Cooperation Organization.

== Foreign policy of Pakistan ==
Pakistan's foreign policy seeks the "promotion of Pakistan as a dynamic, progressive, moderate, and democratic Islamic country; developing friendly relations with all countries of the world, especially major powers and immediate neighbors; consolidating our commercial and economic cooperation with international community."

Pakistan's foreign policy is meant to formalize and define its interactions with foreign nations and standardize interactions with organizations, corporations and individual citizens. Backed by the semi-agricultural and semi-industrialized economy, Pakistan is the 44th largest (nominal GDP, 2025) and 26th largest (purchasing) economic power and 7th largest military in the world in terms of active personnel, with a defense budget of US$10.2 billion (2024), 2.7% of its GDP (2024). The Foreign Minister of Pakistan is the official charged with state-to-state diplomacy, although the Prime Minister maintains ultimate authority over foreign policy. The state foreign policy includes defining the national interest, as well as the economic interest and strategies chosen both to safeguard that and to achieve its policy goals. Following the general election held in May 2013, Tariq Fatimi and NSA Sartaj Aziz were designated as advisers to the Prime Minister on foreign and strategic policies. After the dismissal of Nawaz Sharif's government in July 2017, Khawaja Muhammad Asif held the portfolio of foreign minister under the premiership of Shahid Khaqan Abbasi. After the victory of Imran Khan in the 2018 general elections, Shah Mehmood Qureshi was named the Minister of Foreign Affairs. Subsequently, Bilawal Bhutto Zardari became foreign minister after the political crisis-a position previously held by his grandfather, Zulfikar Ali Bhutto, and Hina Rabbani Khar.

=== Muhammad Ali Jinnah's Vision ===
In 1947, Muhammad Ali Jinnah, founder of the state of Pakistan, clearly described the principles and objectives of Pakistan's foreign policy in a broadcast message, which is featured prominently in a quotation on the homepage of Pakistan's Ministry of Foreign Affairs website: "The foundation of our foreign policy is friendship with all nations across the globe."

On 15 August 1947, outlining the foreign policy of Pakistan, Quaid-e-Azam observed:

"Our objective should be peace within and peace without. We want to live peacefully and maintain cordial and friendly relations with our immediate neighbours and with (the) world at large. We have no aggressive designs against any one. We stand by the United Nations Charter and will gladly make our contribution to the peace and prosperity of the world."

=== Historical overview ===
Since its independence in 1947, Pakistan's foreign policy has encompassed difficult relations with the neighbouring Soviet Union (USSR) who maintained a close military and ideological interaction with the neighbouring countries such as Afghanistan (in the West) and India (in East). During most of 1947–1991, the USSR support was given to Republic of India, over which it has fought three wars on Kashmir conflict. During the 1960s, Pakistan's relations with and neighbouring Afghanistan have also been extremely difficult due to the latter's contest over the Durand Line. The foreign relations with Iran, Turkey, Saudi Arabia and China remain important and based on the extensive cooperation in national security and economical interests in the Persian Gulf and wide-ranging bilateral relations with the United States and other Western countries. With the growing influence of the USSR in the region, Pakistan cemented close security relations with China in Asia and United Kingdom and Germany in Europe during most of the Cold War. Pakistan has had a fluctuating relationship with the United States, Pakistan played a crucial role in the establishment of US-China relations in the 1970s, mediating between the Henry Kissenger and Mao Zedong. At the same time, it also assisted in establishing relationships with other East Asian countries.

In recent years, Pakistan's ties with Russia have moved away from Cold War-era hostilities, and the chill in the relations between Pakistan and the U.S. has further pushed the country towards Russia and China. Prime Minister Imran Khan visited Moscow to meet President Vladimir Putin as Russia was launching the invasion of Ukraine. He has previously criticised America's "war on terror". After the fall of the Pakistan Tehreek-e-Insaf (PTI) -led coalition government in 2022, the emergence of multiple crises has exacerbated the instability of its foreign policy.

=== Pakistan–China relations ===
China has played a significant role in the development, economy and security of Pakistan, with relationship beginning in 1951 when Pakistan was among the first countries to sever diplomatic ties with the Republic of China (on Taiwan Island) and recognizes the People's Republic of China (PRC) on Mainland China as the sole representative. Since then, both countries have placed considerable importance on the maintenance of an extremely close and supportive special relationship and the two countries have regularly exchanged high-level visits resulting in a variety of agreements. The PRC has provided economic, military, and technical assistance to Pakistan, and each country considers the other a close strategic ally. Since the advent of the 21st century, Pakistan and China have strengthened their relations through bilateral trade, military agreements and supporting each other on key issues. The intensifying US-China Strategic Rivalry has put Pakistan in an extremely difficult situation to maintain ties with both of these states. Bilawal Bhutto Zardari accused UN Human Rights Office report on Xinjiang were "taken out of context", and Pakistan supports China's activities for socio-economic development, harmony and peace, and stability.

A cornerstone of the success of China's Belt and Road Initiative (BRI) is the China-Pakistan Economic Corridor (CPEC). CPEC contains initiatives worth a total of $62 billion, such as infrastructure, energy, economic zones, and the development of the Gwadar port. A Chinese spokesperson said in 2022 that "the bond of friendship and mutual assistance between the Chinese and Pakistani people is stronger than gold, and the two countries' iron-clad friendship is deeply rooted in the people and boasts strong vitality.

=== Muslim world ===
After Independence, Pakistan vigorously pursued bilateral relations with other Muslim countries and made a wholehearted bid for leadership of the Muslim world, or at least for leadership in achieving its unity. The Ali brothers had sought to project Pakistan as the natural leader of the Islamic world, in large part due to its large manpower and military strength. A top-ranking Muslim League leader, Khaliquzzaman, declared that Pakistan would bring together all Muslim countries into Islamistan – a pan-Islamic entity. Such developments (alongside Pakistan's creation) did not get American approval and British Prime Minister Clement Attlee voiced international opinion at the time by stating that he wished that India and Pakistan would re-unite. Since most of the Arab world was undergoing a nationalist awakening at the time, there was little attraction to Pakistan's Pan-Islamic aspirations. Some of the Arab countries saw the 'Islamistan' project as a Pakistani attempt to dominate other Muslim states.

Pakistan vigorously championed the right of self-determination for Muslims around the world. Pakistan's efforts for the independence movements of Indonesia, Libya, Algeria, Tunisia, Egypt, Morocco, Somalia, Azerbaijan, and Eritrea were significant and initially led to close ties between these countries and Pakistan. However, Pakistan also masterminded an attack on the Afghan city of Jalalabad during the Afghan Civil War to establish an Islamic government there. Pakistan had wished to foment an 'Islamic Revolution' which would transcend national borders covering Pakistan, Afghanistan and Central Asia.

On the other hand, Pakistan's relations with Iran have been strained at times due to sectarian tensions. Iran and Saudi Arabia used Pakistan as a battleground for their proxy sectarian war and by the 1990s, Pakistan's support for the Sunni Taliban organization in Afghanistan became a problem for Shia-led Iran which opposed a Taliban-controlled Afghanistan. Tensions between Iran and Pakistan intensified in 1998, when Iran accused Pakistan of war crimes as Pakistani warplanes bombarded Afghanistan's last Shia stronghold in support of the Taliban. Although Iran later established ties with the reestablished Taliban government in Afghanistan, the insurgency in Balochistan has increased friction in relations between Iran and Pakistan. In the 1960s, the problems over the Durand Line escalated with Afghanistan which led to open hostilities in the 1970s. After the Taliban took power in 2021, border clashes between Pakistan and Afghanistan have increased sharply.

=== Major alliances ===
In 1947 after gaining independence from the United Kingdom, Pakistan still had close ties with the country. The Prime Minister Liaquat Ali Khan also paid a historical and friendly state visit to the United States, and held meetings with President Harry Truman and the American military officials for the purpose of the military aid in 1951. Ideologically, Prime Minister Ali Khan was opposed to communism; and his government was struggling with issues concerning the matters of uplifting the national economy and protecting interests of national security. In 1954–56, the United States and Pakistan signed the Mutual Defense Assistance Agreement which saw the dispatching of the Military Assistance Advisory Group to provide military training to the Pakistan Armed Forces in 1955–56.

In 1955, Pakistan joined the CENTO and the SEATO alliances. Also, in 1956, when Pakistan declared itself a republic, it continued as a member of the Commonwealth of Nations. In 1971, Pakistan withdrew itself from the two alliances in a vision of exercising an independent foreign policy. In 1964, Pakistan signed the Regional Cooperation for Development (RCD) Pact with Turkey and Iran, when all three countries were closely allied with the U.S., and as neighbours of the Soviet Union, wary of perceived Soviet expansionism. To this day, Pakistan has a close relationship with Turkey. RCD became defunct after the Iranian Revolution, and a Pakistani-Turkish initiative led to the founding of the Economic Cooperation Organization (ECO) in 1985. In 1974, Pakistan became a critical entity in the militarization of the OIC and has historically maintained friendly relations with all the Arab and Muslim countries under the banner of OIC. Pakistan rejoined the Commonwealth in 1989. In 2004, Pakistan became a Major non-NATO ally of the United States.

Pakistan was a member of the Commonwealth from 1947 to 1956 under the name 'Dominion of Pakistan'. From 1956 to 1972, the Islamic Republic of Pakistan was a republic in the Commonwealth of Nations, when it withdrew in protest at the Commonwealth's support of East Pakistan's secession and Bangladesh's independence. In 1989, Pakistan rejoined, despite Pakistan's suspension from the Commonwealth of Nations between 1999 and 2008.

At the Astana Summit on 9 June 2017, Pakistan became a full member of the Shanghai Cooperation Organisation (SCO). Pakistan, Iran and China have also established a 'Trilateral Consultation' to discuss counter-terrorism and security.

=== Major dissensions ===
==== Tensions with India ====
Since 1947, Pakistan's relations have been difficult with neighbour India over regional issues. India and Pakistan have fought three conventional wars throughout the 20th century over the issue of Kashmir. There have been attempts to unite the countries but since 1940, Muhammad Ali Jinnah and his Muslim League had demanded an independent Pakistan, whose Muslims would have their own government rather than remaining subordinate to India's Hindu majority. There are many sources of tension between the two countries but the issues over terrorism, size disparities and three geostrategic issues: Kashmir, water, and the Siachen Glacier, are the major ones resulting in the attenuated volume of trade and trust deficit. The continuing dispute over the status of Kashmir inflames opinions in both nations and makes friendly relations difficult. Since 2019, Pakistan has frozen in relations with India after India revoked the autonomy of its administered Kashmir. Pakistan is also a member of the Coffee Club to oppose Indian membership in the United Nations Security Council.

==== Trust Deficit with U.S. ====
The United States has played an important role in the young history of Pakistan, being one of the first countries to recognize their independence on 14 August 1947. Pakistan consistently found themselves on the United States side of issues faced during the Cold War. At the time, Pakistan served as a geostrategic position for United States military bases since it bordered the Soviet Union and China. The relationship between the two countries went through varying levels of friendliness, but these positive relations would fall apart following successful cooperation in fighting the Soviet Union's influence in Central Asia and the subsequent fall of the Soviet Union.

In reaction to Pakistan's new nuclear capacity, the United States in 1992 passed the Pressler Amendment approving sanctions against Pakistan, Relations would restrengthen following 9/11 with Pakistan's warm response following the tragedy. Aid was given to Pakistan for the first time again in 2002, and the 2000s saw an extension of this friendly relationship. The Bush and Obama administrations has concerns regarding Pakistan include regional and global terrorism; Afghan stability; democratization and human rights protection; the ongoing Kashmir problem and Pakistan-India tensions; and economic development. This dynamic would reach a head following a few incidents highlighted by the operation to kill Osama bin Laden in Abbottabad. While America's troubled relationship with Pakistan continues to be eroded by crisis after crisis, bilateral relationship persists of promoting trade and regional economic cooperation, this type of relationship is beneficial for both countries and gives incentive for continuing friendly relations in the early 2010s. However, with the U.S. troops withdrawal, its role in serving as a conduit for the U.S. in Afghanistan has ended.

Recently U.S. stopped military aid to Pakistan, which was about US$2 billion per year. America's deference to India reflects its importance to counter China's influence in Asia. This imposes a ceiling on cooperation with Pakistan, limiting it to the non-strategic domain. Former Prime Minister Imran Khan had named senior U.S. diplomat Donald Lu as the person who was allegedly involved in the "foreign conspiracy" to topple his government through a no-confidence vote tabled by the Opposition. The U.S. has repeatedly dismissed Khan's allegations.

==== World governance initiatives ====
Pakistan signed the agreement to convene a convention for drafting a world constitution, leading to the establishment of the Constitution for the Federation of Earth in 1968. Ayub Khan, then president of Pakistan, endorsed the agreement to convene a World Constituent Assembly. Member of Parliament and adviser to the Prime Minister, Ahmed Ebrahim Haroon Jaffer, represented Pakistan at the World Constituent Assembly in Interlaken, Switzerland in August 1968.

In 1982, the inaugural Provisional World Parliament (PWP) convened in Brighton, United Kingdom, with Pakistani jurist and diplomat Sir Chaudhry Mohammad Zafarullah Khan presiding over the session at the Royal Pavilion.

== Diplomatic relations ==
List of countries which Pakistan maintains diplomatic relations with:

#	Country	Date
1	Myanmar	1 August 1947
2	United Kingdom	14 August 1947
3	Australia	15 August 1947
4	India	15 August 1947
5	United States	15 August 1947
6	Iran	22 August 1947
7	Saudi Arabia	September 1947
8	Egypt	20 October 1947
9	Turkey	30 November 1947
10	France	2 December 1947
11	Jordan	29 December 1947
12	Iraq	1947
13	Belgium	20 February 1948
14	Netherlands	28 February 1948
15	Afghanistan	29 February 1948
16	Italy	7 April 1948
17	Russia	1 May 1948
18	Sri Lanka	3 May 1948
19	Serbia	15 May 1948
20	Lebanon	15 September 1948
21	Norway	18 December 1948
22	Chile	5 February 1949
23	Switzerland	13 May 1949
24	Philippines	8 September 1949
25	Denmark	13 October 1949
26	Sweden	25 October 1949
27	Portugal	4 November 1949
28	Canada	8 December 1949
29	Syria	December 1949
30	Indonesia	28 April 1950
31	Czech Republic	27 September 1950
32	Finland	12 January 1951
33	Brazil	January 1951
34	New Zealand	18 April 1951
35	China	21 May 1951
36	Spain	17 September 1951
—	Holy See	6 October 1951
37	Thailand	10 October 1951
38	Argentina	15 October 1951
39	Germany	15 October 1951
40	Yemen	4 February 1952
41	Japan	28 April 1952
42	Cambodia	28 May 1952
43	Libya	16 July 1952
44	Austria	13 June 1953
45	Cuba	5 February 1954
46	Mexico	19 January 1955
47	Sudan	24 October 1956
48	Morocco	19 August 1957
49	Malaysia	31 August 1957
50	Ethiopia	28 December 1957
51	Tunisia	25 March 1958
52	Ghana	1 September 1958
53	Luxembourg	5 May 1959
54	Greece	12 February 1960
55	Nepal	20 March 1960
56	Somalia	18 December 1960
57	Senegal	1960
58	Nigeria	22 March 1961
59	Cyprus	1961
60	Sierra Leone	1961
61	Mongolia	6 July 1962
62	Rwanda	July 1962
63	Madagascar	16 August 1962
64	Poland	17 December 1962
65	Cameroon	1962
66	Ireland	1962
67	Jamaica	19 January 1963
68	Kuwait	21 July 1963
69	Algeria	16 August 1963
70	Benin	10 December 1963
71	Guinea	1963
72	Mali	1963
73	Trinidad and Tobago	1963
74	Kenya	31 January 1964
75	Venezuela	15 April 1964
76	Togo	8 May 1964
77	Romania	15 October 1964
78	Uruguay	1964
79	Hungary	26 February 1965
80	Bulgaria	15 June 1965
81	Laos	15 July 1965
82	Albania	24 July 1965
83	Uganda	1 August 1965
84	Niger	15 October 1965
85	Malawi	1965
86	Malta	January 1966
87	Maldives	26 July 1966
88	Singapore	17 August 1966
89	Tanzania	20 February 1967
90	Paraguay	23 October 1967
91	Panama	7 November 1967
92	Guyana	10 November 1967
93	Gambia	1967
94	Mauritius	12 March 1968
95	Ivory Coast	20 December 1968
96	Colombia	19 June 1970
97	Fiji	10 October 1970
98	Mauritania	November 1970
99	Bahrain	14 October 1971
100	Oman	15 October 1971
101	United Arab Emirates	13 January 1972
102	Vietnam	8 November 1972
103	North Korea	9 November 1972
104	Qatar	16 December 1972
105	Zambia	1972
106	Costa Rica	9 November 1973
107	Gabon	February 1974
108	Central African Republic	2 April 1974
109	Chad	30 June 1973
110	Peru	1 September 1974
111	Guinea-Bissau	1974
112	Bolivia	14 January 1975
113	Mozambique	9 August 1975
114	Bangladesh	3 October 1975
115	Republic of the Congo	1975
116	Seychelles	29 June 1976
117	Nicaragua	27 September 1976
118	Papua New Guinea	4 October 1976
119	Iceland	7 December 1976
120	Suriname	7 April 1977
121	Djibouti	27 June 1977
122	Angola	20 October 1977
123	El Salvador	5 February 1979
124	Ecuador	23 July 1979
125	Zimbabwe	November 1980
126	Samoa	7 March 1983
127	Comoros	19 October 1983
128	South Korea	7 November 1983
129	Brunei	9 February 1984
130	Lesotho	4 July 1984
131	Botswana	20 August 1986
132	Cape Verde	30 October 1987
133	Bhutan	15 December 1988
—	State of Palestine	18 January 1989
134	Namibia	22 March 1990
135	Equatorial Guinea	9 October 1990
136	Kazakhstan	24 February 1992
137	Ukraine	16 March 1992
138	Turkmenistan	9 May 1992
139	Kyrgyzstan	10 May 1992
140	Uzbekistan	10 May 1992
141	Slovenia	11 May 1992
142	Tajikistan	6 June 1992
143	Azerbaijan	9 June 1992
144	Moldova	21 December 1992
145	Slovakia	1 January 1993
146	North Macedonia	12 August 1993
147	Estonia	20 September 1993
148	Eritrea	1 December 1993
149	Belarus	3 February 1994
150	South Africa	23 April 1994
151	Georgia	12 May 1994
152	Lithuania	31 May 1994
153	Croatia	20 July 1994
154	Bosnia and Herzegovina	16 November 1994
155	Liechtenstein	4 December 1995
156	Latvia	29 April 1996
157	Timor-Leste	2002
158	Andorra	22 July 2003
159	Bahamas	10 February 2005
160	Burundi	9 March 2005
161	San Marino	12 April 2006
162	Montenegro	23 October 2006
163	Burkina Faso	6 May 2008
164	Monaco	24 February 2009
165	Guatemala	14 October 2011
166	South Sudan	4 June 2012
—	Kosovo	27 January 2013
167	Haiti	10 January 2014
168	Honduras	14 January 2014
169	Belize	21 October 2015
170	Solomon Islands	19 February 2016
171	Vanuatu	8 August 2016
172	Antigua and Barbuda	23 September 2016
173	Kiribati	3 June 2021
174	Palau	22 November 2021
175	Dominican Republic	18 November 2022
176	Saint Kitts and Nevis	25 January 2024
177	Marshall Islands	26 January 2024
178	Dominica	6 February 2024
179	Saint Lucia	28 May 2024
180	Saint Vincent and the Grenadines	3 June 2024
181	Federated States of Micronesia	14 August 2025
182	Armenia	31 August 2025
183	Democratic Republic of the Congo	Unknown
184	Eswatini	Unknown
185	Liberia	Unknown
186	São Tomé and Príncipe	Unknown
187	Tonga	Unknown
188	Tuvalu	Unknown

== Bilateral relations ==
=== Africa ===
Country	Formal relations began	Notes
Algeria		Main article: Algeria–Pakistan relations
Botswana	20 August 1986	Both countries established diplomatic relations on 20 August 1986 when Mr. Tayyab Siddiqui, the then Pakistani Ambassador to Zimbabwe, presented his credentials to President of Botswana Dr. Quett Masire. Botswana has diplomatic relations with Pakistan which is covered by the Botswanan Embassy in Beijing, China and an embassy located in Islamabad within the Republic of Yemen. Pakistan's embassy in Botswana is located in Sana'a, Yemen Trade between the 2 nations in 2001/02 accounted for $20 million Mehru Khan of Pakistan and Botswana was crowned Miss NRI Global 2005 winner at an international pageant.
Central African Republic	2 April 1974	Both countries established diplomatic relations on 2 April 1974 when Pakistan's first ambassador to the Central African Republic, Mr. Sha Ansani presented credentials to President Jean Bedel Bokassa. Pakistani troops were deployed by the UN's Multidimensional Integrated Stabilization Mission in the Central African Republic (MINUSCA) to CAR in 2014, as a peacekeeping force.
Democratic Republic of the Congo		Pakistan's embassy in Zimbabwe is also accredited to Congo. Pakistan maintains an honorary consulate in Kinshasa. Pakistan also has up to 3500 troops in Congo under United Nations Operation in Congo
Egypt	20 October 1947	Both countries established diplomatic relations on 20 October 1947 when the Egyptian Government has agreed to the establishment of a Pakistan Embassy in Cairo and to the appointment Mr. J. A. Rahim as Chargé d'Affaires. Main article: Egypt–Pakistan relations Pakistan and Egypt, both being Muslim countries, share cordial relations. Both are also members of the OIC (Organisation of Islamic Cooperation), as well as "the next eleven" and "D8". After the foundation of Pakistan, it has established diplomatic and trade relations with Egypt.
Ethiopia	28 December 1957	Both countries established diplomatic relations on 28 December 1957
Kenya	31 January 1964	Both countries established diplomatic relations on 31 January 1964 when Mr. K.K.Panni, High Commissioner of Pakistan to Kenya presented his credentials. Main article: Kenya–Pakistan relations Relations between Pakistan and Kenya were first historically established in the 1960s, when Pakistan expressed its support for Kenya in getting independence from British rule. Ever since from that time, relations between the two nations have been warm, with both countries having had discussed previously in the Pakistan-Kenya Joint Ministerial Commission session which was hosted in Nairobi in 2004, about boosting bilateral trade and economic relations.
Lesotho	4 July 1984	Both countries established diplomatic relations on 4 July 1984 Pakistan and Lesotho maintain honorary consulates in each other's country.
Libya	16 July 1952	Both countries established diplomatic relations on 16 July 1952. Main article: Libya–Pakistan relations Pakistan and Libya share warm relations characterized by mutual respect, expanding economic ties, and collaboration at multilateral fora. Our diplomatic relations with Libya were established in December 1951. Joint Ministerial Commission agreement between the two countries was signed in 1974. The MoU on Bilateral Political Consultations between Pakistan and Libya was signed on 2 May 2009. The total Bilateral Trade volume between Pakistan and Libya in2022-23 stood at US$19.04 million with Exports US$9.53 million and Imports US$9.51 million Pakistan has been providing training courses to Libyan officers. Under Pakistan Technical Assistance Programme (PTAP), Pakistan offers scholarships to the Libyan students. There are approximately 4500 Pakistanis living in Libya.
Madagascar		Pakistan maintains an honorary consulate in Madagascar.
Malawi		Pakistan maintains an honorary consulate in Malawi. The Pakistani embassy in Zimbabwe is also accredited as High Commission to Malawi.
Mauritius		Main article: Mauritius–Pakistan relations Pakistan has a High Commission in Port Louis and Mauritius has a High Commission in Islamabad. The two countries are progressing the finalisation of a Free Trade Agreement.
Morocco	19 August 1957	Both countries established diplomatic relations on 19 August 1957 Main article: Morocco–Pakistan relations Pakistan had a pivotal role in the plea for independence for Morocco; in 1952, Moroccan delegate Ahmed Bulferg attempted to address the UN security council and was shut down by the French. Pakistani Foreign Minister Sir Zafaullah Khan arranged for Bulferg to receive a Pakistani nationality, and the latter was then able to address the UN in favor of Morocco's independence. Currently the two countries maintain a robust economic and diplomatic relationship, with collaborations in agriculture, import/export, mining, tourism, and more.
Mozambique	9 August 1975	Both countries established diplomatic relations on 9 August 1975 Pakistan maintain cordial relations with Mozambique. In 1976, on the eve of independence of Mozambique, technical support of Pakistani pilots, engineers and maintenance persons were despatched to Mozambique for making their helicopters airworthy and training of their pilots/ technicians. Pakistan also gave nationality to many Muslim Indians in Mozambique after 1961 Indian annexation of Goa.
Niger	15 October 1965	Both countries established diplomatic relations on 15 October 1965 Pakistan has an embassy in Niamey, although Niger does not maintain a permanent embassy in Islamabad.
Nigeria	22 March 1961	Both countries established diplomatic relations on 22 March 1961 Main article: Nigeria–Pakistan relations Pakistan has a High Commission in Abuja and Nigeria has a High Commission in Islamabad, as well as a consulate-general in Karachi. The two states have maintained a close relationship, a relationship which is described by the Nigerian Defence Minister as "friendly" and like a "family tie"
Sao Tome and Principe	12 December 2006	Pakistan maintains an export cooperation with São Tomé and Príncipe.
Somalia	27 June 1962	Main article: Pakistan–Somalia relations Pakistan recognizes the Federal Government of Somalia as the official national government of Somalia. It maintains strong relations with the Somalian federal authorities, who also have an embassy in Islamabad.
South Africa	23 April 1994	Pakistan maintains a High Commission in Cape Town, and South Africa maintains a High Commission in Islamabad. South Africa is also home to more than 2,500 Pakistanis.
South Sudan		Pakistan and South Sudan maintain an economic, import-export relationship. The countries share a cordial relationship as Muslim-majority countries. Pakistan recognised South Sudan after South Sudan was added as a candidate in the United Nations General Assembly.
Sudan	24 October 1956	Both countries established diplomatic relations on 24 October 1956. Main article: Pakistan–Sudan relations Sudan maintains a positive relationship with Pakistan on the basis of religion, as they are both Muslim-majority states. The relationship relies on shared values of anti-colonialism and common allies. Pakistani troops were also deployed to Sudan as part of the UN peacekeeping force during the second Sudanese civil war.
Tanzania		Pakistan maintains a High Commission in Dar es Salaam, Tanzania.
Tunisia	19 August 1957	Diplomatic relations between the two states were established on 28 May 1958. Main article: Pakistan–Tunisia relations The two countries are members of the OIC, and the Commonwealth of Nations and share similar regional and international concerns. There is also a preferential trade agreement between the two states.
Uganda	1 August 1965	Both countries established diplomatic relations on 1 August 1965 Pakistan maintains an honorary consulate in Kampala. Pakistan also provide scholarships to Ugandan students under its technical assistance programme.
Zambia	1972	Both countries established diplomatic relations in 1972 Zambia maintains a General Honorary Consulate in Islamabad, whereas Pakistan's embassy in Zimbabwe is also accredited as High Commission to Zambia. In February 2008, an 11-member Pakistan Trade Delegation visited Lusaka for exploring bilateral trade cooperation.
Zimbabwe	November 1980	Both countries established diplomatic relations in November 1980 Main article: Pakistan–Zimbabwe relations Pakistan is represented in Zimbabwe by an embassy in Harare. The Pakistani government has pledged to always "stand by Zimbabwe in its challenging times and continue to render assistance in every way possible in an effort to cement the already cordial relations between the two countries. Pakistan has also helped in structuring Zimbabwe's Armed Forces, The first Head of the Air Force of Zimbabwe was also a Pakistan Air Force Officer Air Marshal Azim Daudpoto who served as a Commander of the Air Force of Zimbabwe from July 1983 to January 1986."

=== Americas ===
Country	Formal relations began	Notes
Argentina	15 October 1951	Both countries established diplomatic relations on 15 October 1951. In 2002, the countries signed an agreement to boost their trade relations. Main article: Argentina–Pakistan relations A memorandum of Understanding with the National Academy of Exact, Physical and Natural Sciences of Argentina and the Pakistan Academy of Sciences was signed in 2008 The two states signed another memorandum of understanding on cooperation in sanitary and phyto-sanitary issues in relation to trade ties between the Ministry of National Food Security and Research of Pakistan and the Ministry of Agriculture, Livestock and Fisheries of Argentina.
Belize	21 October 2015	Both countries established diplomatic relations on 21 October 2015.; Both countries are members of the Commonwealth of Nations.
Brazil	1948	Diplomatic relationship between Brazil and Pakistan commenced in 1948. Trade Relations between Brazil and Pakistan were established in 1982. Pakistan's current Commercial Counsellor to Brazil is Dr Muhammad Babar Chohan. Main article: Brazil–Pakistan relations Brazil was the first nation in South America to recognize Pakistan, in 1948, and to establish an embassy in Pakistan's former capital Karachi The two states cooperate in fields like defense, education, and import/export, despite some objection from India.
Canada	May 1949	Main article: Canada–Pakistan relations Pakistan is represented through its High Commission in Ottawa and consulates in Toronto, Montreal and Vancouver. Canada is represented through its High Commission in Islamabad and consulate in Karachi. The value of the bilateral trade relationship between Pakistan and Canada was close to C$694 million (approximately US$701 million) in 2007. There are also extensive people to people links between Canada and Pakistan with an estimated 22,000 Pakistanis living in Canada.
Cuba	28 October 1955	Both countries established diplomatic relations on 28 October 1955 Main article: Cuba–Pakistan relations Relations between the two countries strengthened after Cuba provided humanitarian assistance to the victims of the 2005 Kashmir earthquake. In 2008, the Pakistani cabinet authorized negotiations for the establishment of a Joint Economic Commission, that was finalized in 2009. Both nations continue to strengthen the bilateral relations especially in the fields of higher education, agriculture, industry and science and technology and have also held talks for military cooperation.
Guyana	10 November 1967	Both countries established diplomatic relations on 10 November 1967. Guyana along with Suriname is one of the only 2 member states of the OIC in the Americas. Pakistan maintains an honorary consulate in Guyana. The Muslims of Guyana provided moral support for the Independence of Pakistan. Many of the Muslims from British Guiana even took Pakistani citizenship after the Independence of Pakistan in 1947 and migrated to Pakistan.
Jamaica	19 January 1963	Both countries established diplomatic relations on 19 January 1963. Pakistan's ambassador to the USA is accredited as Pakistan's non-resident High Commissioner to Jamaica.
Mexico	19 January 1955	Both countries established diplomatic relations on 19 January 1955 Main article: Mexico–Pakistan relations Pakistan maintains an embassy in Mexico City, and Mexico is accredited to Pakistan from its embassy in Tehran. Both countries are also working on Mechanism of Bilateral Consultations on Issues of Mutual Interest for Mexico and Pakistan.
Paraguay	23 October 1967	Both countries established diplomatic relations on 23 October 1967. Pakistan maintains an embassy in Argentina which is accredited to Paraguay and a consulate in Asunción. Paraguay maintains an embassy in Egypt accredited to Pakistan and an honorary consulate in Islamabad. Government ministers met in 2005 to explore potential trade opportunities. Bilateral trade in 2010 totaled US$2.4 million per year and growing yearly. Pakistan exports carpets, and has one of the most feared militaries in the world also g side with surgical instruments to Paraguay, whereas Paraguay exports pharmaceuticals
Suriname	25 April 1977	Both countries established diplomatic relations on 25 April 1977. Pakistan and Suriname both maintain friendly and cooperative relations. Many of Suriname Hindustani Muslim speak Urdu, and maintain cultural link in Pakistan. Surinamese Islamic Association maintains its umberalla headquarters in Islamabad, Pakistan
Trinidad and Tobago	1963	Both countries established diplomatic relations in 1963 when Mr. S. M. Khan, Pakistan High Commissioner in Canada, had been cross-appointed concurrently as High Commissioner to Trinidad and Tobago. Pakistan maintains a consulate general in North Trinidad. Trinidad is also home to a sizeable number of South Asian Muslims who draw links with Pakistan. During the 2010 Pakistan floods, Trinidad Congress of the People party donated US$33,000 worth of aid to Pakistan flood victims.
United States	15 August 1947	Both countries established diplomatic relations on 15 August 1947 Main article: Pakistan–United States relations
Uruguay	1964	Pakistan has an honorary consulate in Montevideo. As of 2014 the Pakistani ambassador to Argentina, Imtiaz Ahmad was accredited to Uruguay. In 2006 a commercial agreement was celebrated between Pakistan and Mercosur (a trade bloc of which Uruguay is part). There is a Pakistan-Uruguay Chamber of Commerce.

=== Asia ===
Country	Formal relations began	Notes
Afghanistan	29 February 1948	Both countries established diplomatic relations on 29 February 1948. Main article: Afghanistan–Pakistan relations
Armenia	31 August 2025	Main article: Armenia–Pakistan relations: Both countries established diplomatic relations on 31 August 2025.; On 29 August 2025, the foreign ministers of the two nations "agreed to consider establishing diplomatic relations".
Azerbaijan	9 June 1992	Both countries established diplomatic relations on 9 June 1992 Main article: Azerbaijan–Pakistan relations Pakistan recognized independence of Azerbaijan 1991 (the second country after Turkey) and the two countries established full diplomatic relations in 1992. Pakistan was one of the first countries to open its embassy in Baku.
Bahrain	14 October 1971	Both countries established diplomatic relations on 14 October 1971. Main article: Bahrain–Pakistan relations Islamabad and Manama enjoy close co-operations between the two in many fields of brotherhood. Joint initiatives between Bahraini and Pakistani governments have started to further bilateral trades that reached $250 million in 2007. Pakistan Army also maintains an Infantry Battalion and a Squadron of Tanks in Bahrain
Bangladesh	3 October 1975	Both countries established diplomatic relations on 3 October 1975. Main article: Bangladesh–Pakistan relations Relations between the Islamic Republic of Pakistan and the People's Republic of Bangladesh are influenced by the fact that Bangladesh was a part of Pakistan until 1971, when it achieved independence after the Bangladesh Liberation War and the Indo-Pakistani War of 1971. As part of Shimla Agreement, India sought to make sure that Pakistan would take steps to recognize Bangladesh. Pakistan established full diplomatic relations with Bangladesh on 18 January 1976, and relations improved in the following decades. Both Bangladesh and Pakistan are members of the Commonwealth.
Bhutan	15 December 1988	Both countries established diplomatic relations on 15 December 1988. Main article: Bhutan–Pakistan relations Both countries are member of SAARC. Trade and bilateral relationship between the two countries can be largely regarded as being insignificant, and the diplomatic relationship as being largely symbolic.
Brunei	9 February 1984	Both countries established diplomatic relations on 9 February 1984. Main article: Brunei–Pakistan relations Diplomatic relationship between Pakistan and Brunei are very warm and friendly, this is primarily because both are Muslim countries and member of the Organisation of Islamic Cooperation. Pakistan maintains a High Commission in Brunei, and Brunei has a High Commission in Islamabad, Pakistan. To further foster ties between the 2 countries, Brunei-Pakistan Friendship Association (BPFA) was created in 2008.
Cambodia	18 January 1957	Main article: Cambodia–Pakistan relations Pakistan has an embassy in Phnom Penh although Cambodia does not have an embassy in Pakistan.
China	21 May 1951	Main article: China–Pakistan relations Diplomatic relations between Pakistan and the People's Republic of China (PRC) were established on 21 May 1951, shortly after the retreat of the Republic Of China in 1949. While initially ambivalent towards the idea of a Communist country on its borders, Pakistan hoped that the PRC would be a reliable friend. India had recognised the PRC a year before, and Indian Prime Minister Nehru also hoped for closer relations because India was afraid of the PRC. However, with escalating border tensions leading to the 1962 Sino-Indian war, the PRC and Pakistan formed an alliance and India got badly beaten by China. India surrendered and called for retreat. China controlled the area that belonged to China. However, Pakistan and China sorted their border lines Trans-Karakoram Tract professionally.
Cyprus	1961	Pakistan's support for Northern Cyprus creates tension between the two countries.
Georgia	12 May 1994	Georgia is accredited to Pakistan from its embassy in Tehran, Iran.; Pakistan is accredited to Georgia from its embassy in Baku, Azerbaijan.
India	15 August 1947	Both countries established diplomatic relations on 15 August 1947 when has been appointed first Pakistan's High Commissioner to India Mr. Zahid Hussain. Main article: India–Pakistan relations Relations between India and Pakistan have been strained by a number of historical and political issues, and are defined by the violent partition of British India in 1947, the Kashmir dispute and the numerous military conflicts fought between the two nations. Consequently, even though the two South Asian nations share historic, cultural, geographic, and economic links, their relationship has been plagued by hostility and suspicion. India and Pakistan have fought in numerous armed conflicts since their independence. There are three major wars that have taken place between the two states, namely in 1947, 1965 and the Bangladesh Liberation War in 1971. In addition to this was the unofficial Kargil War and some border skirmishes. Both India and Pakistan are member states of the Commonwealth of Nations.
Indonesia	28 April 1950	Main article: Indonesia–Pakistan relations Indonesia has its embassy in Islamabad and a consulate in Karachi and Pakistan has its embassy in Jakarta and a consulate in Medan. Bilateral trade between the two countries is US$800 million but they hope to increase this to US$2 billion. Both nations are members of the Developing 8 and Next Eleven countries.
Iran	23 August 1947	Both countries established diplomatic relations on 23 August 1947 when Pakistan and Iran have agreed to exchange diplomatic representatives. Main article: Iran–Pakistan relations
Iraq	1947	Main article: Iraq–Pakistan relations
Israel	No formal diplomatic relations	Main article: Israel–Pakistan relations
Japan	28 April 1952	Both countries established diplomatic relations on 28 April 1952 Main article: Japan–Pakistan relations Tokyo and Islamabad have had healthy relations with each other since the foundation of their diplomacy in 1952. Japan has been part of funding the country with machines to access ground water, as well as aid for improving its sewer and drainage systems. Other major projects funded by the Japanese government include the Indus Highway Project, a number of power projects in various provinces of Pakistan, Rural Roads Construction Project and the Children Hospital PIMS Islamabad Project. Presently the Kohat Tunnel Project and the Ghazi Brotha Dam Project are being completed with the help of the Japanese private and government contractors.
Jordan	29 December 1947	Main article: Jordan–Pakistan relations Both countries established diplomatic relations on 29 December 1947 when Mr. Mohammad Pasha El Shuraiki, Envoy Extraordinary and Minister Plenipotentiary of Transjordan to Pakistan, presented his credentials. There are close relations between Jordan and Pakistan. Princess Sarvath wife of Prince Hassan is originally a Pakistani. At the international level Pakistan and Jordan have similar views such as the Israel/Palestine issue.
Kazakhstan	24 February 1992	Main article: Kazakhstan–Pakistan relations Relations between the two countries began when Pakistan recognized Kazakhstan on 20 December 1991. On 24 February 1992, diplomatic and consular relations were established during an official visit by Kazakhstani president Nursultan Nazarbayev to Pakistan. Kazakhstan is an emerging market for Pakistani goods.
North Korea	9 November 1972	Main article: North Korea–Pakistan relations
South Korea	7 November 1983	Main article: Pakistan–South Korea relations
Kuwait	21 July 1963	Both countries established diplomatic relations on 21 July 1963 when Kuwait opened an embassy in Islamabad. Main article: Kuwait–Pakistan relations After the end of the first Gulf War in 1991, Pakistani army engineers were involved in a programme of mine clearance in the country. Kuwait was also the first country to send aid to isolated mountain villages in Kashmir after the quake of 2005, also offering the largest amount of aid in the aftermath of the quake, US$100 million.
Kyrgyzstan	10 May 1992	Main article: Kyrgyzstan–Pakistan relations Pakistan extended diplomatic recognition to the Kyrgyz Republic on 20 December 1991. A Protocol for the establishment of diplomatic relations between Pakistan and Kyrgyzstan was signed on 10 May 1992.
Laos	15 July 1955	Main article: Laos–Pakistan relations
Lebanon	15 September 1948	Both countries established diplomatic relations on 15 September 1948. Main article: Lebanon–Pakistan relations Lebanon and Pakistan have good relations. Pakistan has also been a steadfast supporter of Lebanon particularly when it was invaded by Israel. Additionally, Pakistan has extended moral, diplomatic and material support to Lebanon and refuses to recognize Israel officially, as a legitimate country in solidarity with the Palestinian, Lebanese and other Middle Eastern countries.
Malaysia	1957	Main article: Malaysia–Pakistan relations Pakistan has its High Commission in Kuala Lumpur, and Malaysia has its High Commission in Islamabad. Pakistan has brotherly relations with Malaysia. Both are members of the Organisation of Islamic Cooperation and the Commonwealth of Nations. There is a trade and cultural pact between the two countries, under which the import and export of various goods is done on fairly large scale. Both countries enjoy close relations and links of mutual friendship and the cooperation has further strengthened.
Maldives	26 July 1966	Both countries established diplomatic relations on 26 July 1966. Main article: Maldives–Pakistan relations The Maldives and Pakistan are culturally very close in sharing a Sunni majority. Islamabad supports the Maldivian position in the territorial dispute over the southern Indian colony of Minicoy Island in the Lakshadweep, whose population is Muslim by faith. Both the Maldives and Pakistan are member states of the Commonwealth of Nations.
Mongolia	6 July 1962	Both countries established diplomatic relations on 6 July 1962. Pakistan and Mongolia maintain cordinal diplomatic relationship.
Myanmar	1 August 1947	Both countries established diplomatic relations on 1 August 1947. Main articles: Burma–Pakistan relations and Burmese people in Pakistan Pakistan has an embassy in Yangon, and Burma has an embassy in Islamabad. In January 2012, President Asif Ali Zardari paid a state visit to Yangon, Burma where he met Aung San Suu Kyi and conferred her the "Shaheed Benazir Bhutto Award for Democracy" for her long struggle for democracy. Zardari's children were also present in the ceremony.
Nepal	20 March 1960	Both countries established diplomatic relations on 20 March 1960 Main article: Nepal–Pakistan relations Despite an extensive 1982 trade agreement, the volume of bilateral trade remains comparatively small at US$4.8 million. Pakistan's total exports to Nepal are worth US$1.631 million while Nepal's exports to Pakistan tally US$3.166 million. Both countries have recently stepped up efforts to promote bilateral trade, especially in textiles, oilseeds, extraction of oil and tourism; Pakistan also offered a US$5 million line of credit to Nepal. Nepal and Pakistan are signatories to the South Asia Free Trade Agreement (SAFTA) and members of the South Asian Economic Union.
Oman	15 October 1971	Both countries established diplomatic relations on 15 October 1971, when Pakistani Consulate-General in Muscat upgraded to Embassy Main article: Oman–Pakistan relations The relationship between Muscat and Islamabad is warm, because it is the nearest Arab country to Pakistan and the fact that some 30% of Omanis are of Balochi origin from Pakistan's Balochistan province having settled in Oman over a hundred years ago. Until 1958, Gwadar was part of Oman but was transferred to Pakistan in that year after being sold.
Palestine	18 January 1989	Diplomatic relations established on 18 January 1989 Main article: Pakistan–Palestine relations Pakistan fully supports the proposal of the creation of an independent Palestinian state. Due to Pakistan's pro-Palestinian stance, bilateral relations between Pakistan and Israel have continuously wavered over the last few years. Pakistan has also declined to recognise the state of Israel until the "liberation of Palestine" will take place. In September 2025, Pakistan, along with fifteen other countries, issued a joint statement supporting the Global Sumud Flotilla to Gaza and warning against any unlawful actions targeting it.
Philippines	8 September 1949	Both countries established diplomatic relations on 8 September 1949. Main article: Pakistan–Philippines relations
Qatar	16 December 1972	Both countries established diplomatic relations on 16 December 1972.
Saudi Arabia	September 1947	Both countries established diplomatic relations in September 1947 Main article: Pakistan–Saudi Arabia relations Saudi Arabia has also provided extensive religious and educational aid to Pakistan. Saudi Arabia remains a major destination for immigration amongst Pakistanis, the number of whom living in Saudi Arabia stands between 900,000 and 1 million. Saudi Arabia is the largest source of petroleum for Pakistan. It also supplies extensive financial aid to Pakistan and remittance from Pakistani migrants to Saudi Arabia is also a major source of foreign currency.
Singapore	17 August 1966	Main article: Pakistan–Singapore relations
Sri Lanka	May 1948	Main article: Pakistan–Sri Lanka relations Sri Lanka's ties with Pakistan have always been good, ever since Pakistan established its small mission in then-Ceylon (later Sri Lanka) in circa 1948–1949. Since then, these relations have gradually developed into very close and cordial ties. Pakistan has been supplying military equipment to the Sri Lanka Armed Forces since 1999. Pakistan has pledged since 2009 to assist in military training and intelligence to form a joint terror fighting force for their two countries. There is a Pakistani High Commission located in Sri Lanka and a Sri Lankan High Commission sit"Sri Lanka"uated in Pakistan.
Syria	1948	Main article: Pakistan–Syria relations Both countries were on the silk route through which civilizational exchanges took place for centuries, Islamic missionaries that introduced Islam after 711 AD were from Syria. During the Yom Kippur War of 1973 (usually referred to as the Ramadan war in Pakistan) several Pakistani pilots assisted the Syrian air force. In 2005 Syria and Pakistan agreed on mutual cooperation in the fields of science and technology.
Taiwan	14 August 1947 – 4 January 1950	Main article: Pakistan-Taiwan relations
Tajikistan	6 June 1992	Both countries established diplomatic relations on 6 June 1992. Main article: Pakistan–Tajikistan relations The Islamic Republic of Pakistan, established diplomatic relationship with the Republic of Tajikistan in 1992, but cooperation between these two countries started from 1991. Geographically Tajikistan is the nearest Central Asian State to Pakistan – fourteen kilometres between two countries. Many Tajiks have immigrated to Pakistan, notably in the city of Ishkoman where they have integrated into the local population.
Thailand	10 October 1951	Both countries established diplomatic relations on 10 October 1951. Main article: Pakistan–Thailand relations Establishing cordial relationships started in 1951, and since has grown into a close diplomacy as trade value between the two nations has grown over US$1 billion. Pakistani universities account for 600 students from Thailand. Thailand enjoyed in 2013 over seventy five thousand tourists from Pakistan. Overall, relations are warm and social and economic exchanges are well developed and continuing to grow.
Turkey	November 1947	Main article: Pakistan–Turkey relations: Pakistan has an embassy in Ankara and a Consulate General in Istanbul.; Turkey has an embassy in Islamabad and Consulates General in Karachi and Lahore.; Both countries are members of Asia Cooperation Dialogue, Economic Cooperation Organization, OIC and WTO.; Trade volume between the two countries was US$856 million in 2019 (Pakistan's exports/imports: 306/550 million USD).; Yunus Emre Institute has a local headquarters in Karachi and Lahore.
Turkmenistan	9 May 1992	Both countries established diplomatic relations on 9 May 1992. Main article: Pakistan–Turkmenistan relations Pakistan was one of the first countries to recognize Turkmenistan as an independent country in December 1991. Exchange of high-level visits during the last 10 years give credence to the fact that Pakistan and Turkmenistan have laid foundation of mutually beneficial relations, friendship and understanding. The two countries have signed 21 Agreements and Memoranda of understanding in the fields of oil and gas, transport, energy, trade, science and culture.
United Arab Emirates	13 January 1972	Both countries established diplomatic relations on 13 January 1972 Main article: Pakistan–United Arab Emirates relations Pakistan was the first country to accord formal recognition to the UAE on its achieving independence. Bilateral relations and mutually beneficial cooperation have progressed steadily ever since. These relations date back to the UAE's formation in 1971, and have since evolved into wide-ranging co-operation in various fields. UAE has been a major donor of economic assistance to Pakistan.
Uzbekistan	10 May 1992	Both countries established diplomatic relations on 10 May 1992. Main article: Pakistan–Uzbekistan relations Relations between the two states were established when the republic of Uzbekistan became independent following the collapse of the USSR, the relations between the two countries were initially strained by the situation in Afghanistan which both countries border as they supported different factions Afghan factions. However relations improved after the fall of the Taliban, both countries seeking to improve relations for the sake of trade, Pakistan wishing to gain access to Central Asian markets and landlocked Uzbekistan to access ports on the Indian Ocean.
Vietnam	8 November 1972	Both countries established diplomatic relations on 8 November 1972. Main article: Pakistan–Vietnam relations
Yemen	4 February 1952	Both countries established diplomatic relations on 4 February 1952

=== Europe ===
Country	Formal relations began	Notes
Albania	27 July 1965	Pakistan's diplomatic relations with Albania are very cordial given that Albania is the, and only European country with OIC membership. In Dec 2006, Albanian Deputy Foreign Minister Mr. Anton Gurakqui visited Pakistan to hold bilateral consultation with Pakistani political leadership. Pakistan also offers training facilities to young Albanian bureaucrats in the field of banking, finance, management and diplomacy.
Austria	13 June 1953	Both countries established diplomatic relations on 13 June 1953 Main article: Austria–Pakistan relations
Belgium	20 February 1948	Both countries established diplomatic relations on 20 February 1948. Main article: Belgium–Pakistan relations
Bosnia and Herzegovina	16 November 1994	Both countries established diplomatic relations on 16 November 1994. Main article: Bosnia and Herzegovina–Pakistan relations Both nations share close relations on the grounds of religion and politics. Pakistan was a staunch supporter of Bosnia during the civil war. Pakistan sent in UN Peacekeeping forces to the former Yugoslavia during the Yugoslav wars. Pakistan and Bosnia have a free trade agreement.
Belarus	3 February 1994	Both countries established diplomatic relations on 3 February 1994. Main article: Belarus–Pakistan relations Belarus' Minsk Tractor Works has played a key role in supplying tractor to Pakistan and establishing the tractor assembly plant in Pakistan. Belarus and Pakistan have also signed agreements on trade-economic cooperation and investments protection. Pakistan ambassador to Russia is accredited as a non-residential ambassador to Belarus; however, Belarus maintains an embassy in Islamabad since 2014. In May 2007, Pakistan Minister of State for Foreign Affairs, Makhdum Khusro Bakhtyar made an official visit to Belarus and meet with high-ranking government officials of Belarus.
Bulgaria	15 June 1965	Both countries established diplomatic relations on 15 June 1965
Croatia	20 July 1994	Both countries established diplomatic relations on 20 July 1994 Pakistan maintains an honorary consulate in Zagreb.
Czech Republic	27 September 1950	Both countries established diplomatic relations on 27 September 1950 Main article: Czech Republic–Pakistan relations
Denmark	13 October 1949	Both countries established diplomatic relations on 13 October 1949. Main article: Denmark–Pakistan relations
Finland	12 January 1951	Both countries established diplomatic relations on 12 January 1951. Main article: Finland–Pakistan relations
France	2 December 1947	Both countries established diplomatic relations on 2 December 1947 Main article: France–Pakistan relations Pakistan and France have high levels of diplomatic meetings and are in good terms with one another. However, these good relations haven't been around very long. Trade between Pakistan and France is increasing and France has donated large funds to help Pakistan with its economic problems.
Germany	15 October 1951	Both countries established diplomatic relations on 15 October 1951. Main article: Germany–Pakistan relations Germany and Pakistan enjoy closely cordial relations. Germany has taken large measures to aid the South Asian country in its economic and governmental hardship. Commercial trade between Berlin and Islamabad has also been very essential in recent years seeing as Germany is Pakistan's fourth largest trade partner. Also, Germany is home to 35,081 Pakistani immigrants. Overall, the two nations have almost always had a friendly bond.
Greece		Main article: Greece–Pakistan relations In modern times, Pakistan's first embassy in Athens was opened in 1975. Greece established an embassy in Islamabad in 1987. There are around 32,500 Pakistani people living and working in Greece.
Holy See	6 October 1951	Both countries established diplomatic relations on 6 October 1951 Main article: Holy See–Pakistan relations
Hungary	26 November 1965	Both countries established diplomatic relations on 26 November 1965 Main article: Hungary–Pakistan relations Since 1970, Hungary has an embassy in Islamabad and an honorary consulate in Karachi. Pakistan has an embassy in Budapest
Iceland	1976	Pakistan maintains cordinal diplomatic relations with Iceland.
Ireland		Main article: Ireland–Pakistan relations Ireland is represented in Pakistan through its embassy in Riyadh (Saudi Arabia) and an honorary consulate in Karachi. Pakistan has an embassy in Dublin. Pakistanis continue to support the idea of unification of Northern Ireland to the Republic of Ireland which remains part of the United Kingdom after the Republic of Ireland left the Commonwealth of Nations.
Italy	7 April 1948	Both countries established diplomatic relations on 7 April 1948. Main article: Italy–Pakistan relations Both nations have established respective embassies in Pakistan and Italy. Italy has offered assistance in Pakistan's private sector in extending credit lines to finance technologies in machinery for manufacturing. Additionally, Italy has given Pakistan the opportunity to be financed the equivalent of US$100 million to advance over fifty development projects in the nation, such as assisting acid attack victims in Punjab. Italy has shown interest in expanding energy and pharmaceutical businesses to the expansive market in Pakistan. There is even an Italian government desire for the implementation of an Italian Chamber of Commerce in the Pakistani economic sphere.
Latvia	29 April 1996	Both countries established diplomatic relations on 29 April 1996 Latvia maintains an honorary consul in Karachi. Whereas the Pakistani ambassador to Sweden is accredited as a non-residential ambassador to Latvia. There is also a growing number of Pakistanis (mostly university students) living in Riga.
Liechtenstein		The Pakistani ambassador to Switzerland is accredited as a non-residential ambassador to Liechtenstein. Pakistan diplomatic relations with Liechtenstein is important, despite the small size of Liechtenstein, as Liechtenstein is member of the European Free Trade Association, with which Pakistan is seeking a free trade agreement.
Lithuania	31 May 1994	Both countries established diplomatic relations on 31 May 1994 Pakistan maintains friendly diplomatic relations with Lithuania.
Luxembourg	22 November 1956	Pakistan maintains cordial diplomatic relations with the Grand Duchy of Luxembourg. Pakistan also maintains an honorary consulate in Luxembourg.
Malta	January 1966	Main article: Malta–Pakistan relations
Moldova	16 February 1992	Both countries established diplomatic relations on 16 February 1992. The Pakistani ambassador to Romania is accredited as a non-residential ambassador to Moldova.
Netherlands	1948	Main article: Netherlands–Pakistan relations: the Netherlands has an embassy in Islamabad.; Pakistan has an embassy in The Hague.
Norway	18 December 1948	Both countries established diplomatic relations on 18 December 1948. Main article: Norway–Pakistan relations Norway and Pakistan have strengthened ties. Norway has an embassy in Islamabad and an honorary consulate in Lahore, whereas Pakistan has an embassy in Oslo.
Portugal	26 September 1949	Relationships between Portugal and Pakistan have turned cordial since 2015. The two nations recognize a potential growth in trade and social exchanges. In order to start economic relations in the right direction, investment policy and opportunities for Portuguese companies are now present.
Romania	15 October 1964	Both countries established diplomatic relations on 15 October 1964Pakistan has an embassy in Bucharest and an honorary consulate in Iaşi. Romania has an embassy in Islamabad and an honorary consulate in Lahore.
Russia	1 May 1948	Main article: Pakistan–Russia relations Relations between these two countries have been strained in the past, because of Pakistan's close ties to America and its support for the Afghan rebels during the invasion by the USSR. However, the relations became cordinal in recent years and the Russian Army has been training in Pakistan.
San Marino	12 April 2006	Pakistan established diplomatic relations with San Marino on 12 April 2006. The Pakistani ambassador to Italy is accredited as a non-residential ambassador to San Marino.
Serbia	15 May 1948	Both countries established diplomatic relations on 15 May 1948. Main article: Pakistan–Serbia relations Since July 2001, Pakistan has an embassy in Belgrade. Serbia has now closed its embassy in Pakistan after 2001 due to financial or reciprocal reasons because Pakistan's role in the desire for Sanjak's merger with their brethren of Bosnia and Herzegovina and is now represented in Pakistan through its embassy in Beijing (China). However, there is a bone of contention between the two, because of the latter's close relations with, India.
Slovakia	1 January 1993	Both countries established diplomatic relations on 1 January 1993 The Pakistani ambassador to Austria is cross-accredited be the non-residential ambassador to Slovakia. Relations between Pakistan and the Slovak Republic are cordial and friendly. The two countries have agreements on cultural cooperation and visa abolition (for diplomatic/official passport holders). Some well known Slovak companies like Matador and Mediprogress are active in Pakistan through their agents.
Spain	2 September 1951	Main article: Pakistan–Spain relations: Pakistan has an embassy in Madrid.; Spain has an embassy in Islamabad.
Switzerland	1 February 1949	Main article: Pakistan–Switzerland relations
Sweden	1949	
Ukraine	16 March 1992	Main article: Pakistan–Ukraine relations Pakistan recognized Ukraine's independence in 1991. Pakistan has an embassy in Kyiv. Ukraine has an embassy in Islamabad. Ukraine and Pakistan have been cooperating with each other in educational sector as well as cultural exchanges. Pakistan and Ukraine are also heavily cooperating with each other in aerospace engineering, aerospace technologies, bio-medical sciences and science and technology.
United Kingdom	14 August 1947	Main article: Pakistan–United Kingdom relations Pakistani Prime Minister Shehbaz Sharif with British Prime Minister Keir Starmer at a United Nations General Assembly in New York City, September 2024. Pakistan established diplomatic relations with the United Kingdom on 14 August 1947.: Pakistan maintains a high commission in London.; The United Kingdom is accredited to Pakistan through its high commission in Islamabad, as well as a deputy high commission in Karachi.; The UK governed Pakistan from 1824 to 1947, when Pakistan achieved full independence. Both countries share common membership of the Commonwealth, the United Nations, and the World Trade Organization. Bilaterally the two countries have a Development Partnership, a Double Taxation Convention, and an Investment Agreement.

=== Oceania ===
Country	Formal relations began	Notes
Australia	15 August 1947	Both countries established diplomatic relations on 15 August 1947 Main article: Australia–Pakistan relations Former Pakistani President Pervez Musharraf visited Australia in 2005 and the former Prime Minister of Australia, John Howard, also having extended a visit to Pakistan in 2005 as well, following the 2005 Kashmir earthquake which had immensely targeted the northern areas of Pakistan. He also announced 500 new scholarships for students in Pakistan to study in Australia.
Fiji	8 March 1971	Pakistan and Fiji maintain formal diplomatic relationship, they have diplomatic missions in each other's countries. Pakistan used to designate their High Commissioner to Australia as a non-residential High Commissioner to Fiji. Many of Fiji's large Muslim population maintain family links with Pakistan.
New Zealand	18 April 1951	Both countries established diplomatic relations on 18 April 1951. Main article: New Zealand–Pakistan relations Pakistan has a High Commission located in Wellington whilst New Zealand has a consulate-general in Karachi. New Zealand was party to the Commonwealth Heads of Government decision to readmit Pakistan to the Councils of the Commonwealth after the restoration of civilian rule in May 2008.
Palau	22 November 2021	Both countries established diplomatic relations on 22 November 2021.
Samoa	7 March 1983	Both countries established diplomatic relations on 7 March 1983.
Solomon Islands	19 February 2016	Both countries established diplomatic relations on 19 February 2016.
Tonga	before 1992	Both countries established diplomatic relations before 1992 when the High Commissioner to Australia was cross-accredited as High Commissioner of Pakistan to Tonga (resident in Canberra). While Pakistan and Tonga maintain diplomatic relationships, they do not have diplomatic missions in each other's country. Pakistan exports to Tonga in 2007 was T$11,655 (approximately US$7,000). Pakistan also has bilateral visa-abolition scheme with Tonga, for all passport types of both the countries.

=== International organizations ===
Country	Formal relations began	Notes
Arab League	Non-member	Main article: Arab League–Pakistan relations Pakistan is neither a member nor an observer of the Arab League, but the two entities share a strong relationship. Many of the Arab League nations send soldiers to train in Pakistan's prestigious military academies, and Pakistan is frequently in contact and collaboration with many of the Arab League nations; Pakistani pilots flew in the two Arab-Israeli Wars. Pakistan has also lobbied for greater representation of the Arab League within the United Nation Security Council.
ASEAN	Non-member	Pakistan is not a member of ASEAN, but frequently serves as a bridge for the organization to communicate with Asian countries further to the west, with bilateral agreements between ASEAN and Pakistan. While links could still be stronger between Pakistan and the nations that compose ASEAN, both sides have expressed interest in furthering that relationship. Commonwealth of Nations - Member - See Pakistan and the Commonwealth of Nations
European Union	Non-member	Main article: Pakistan–European Union relations Pakistan and the EU share a strong economic bond that has been emphasized by both parties while sharing similar foreign policies. The two are engaged in serious trade, and frequently work together to enhance each other's economic capability. There have been multiple summits and strategic dialogues between Pakistan and the EU to continue to push the relationship.
IMF	1950	Pakistan is a full member of the IMF, and has received monetary assistance from IMF multiple times, each time resulting in a successful bailout for Pakistan. IMF also maintains a Resident Representative Office in Pakistan
Economic Cooperation Organization	1985	Pakistan, Turkey, and Iran founded the ECO in 1985, with plans for economic and political cooperation in the region. Through the work of this organization, Iran has free trade agreements with Iran, Turkey, and Afghanistan forthcoming shortly.
NATO	Non-member	Pakistan is a major non-NATO ally, a special designation from the US for certain non-NATO states, earning the status shortly into the war on terrorism by George W. Bush. This designation comes with certain benefits highlighted by special access to particular military technology or collaboration. The two have cooperated and continue to cooperate on projects like eradicating terrorism in Bosnia and Afghanistan, and offer each other logistic and military support.
OIC	1969	Main article: Pakistan and the Organisation of Islamic Cooperation Pakistan has used the Organization for Islamic Cooperation in the past to strengthen alliances and settle disputes or disagreements. The 2nd summit of the OIC was in Pakistan, during a time in which Pakistan still did not recognize Bangladesh. Under pressure from other nations, Pakistan would invite a delegation from Bangladesh and here at this summit Pakistan would come to recognize the nation. Pakistan also uses the OIC to push their position on the controversial region of Kashmir.
SAARC	1985	Pakistan is one of the founding members of SAARC, an organization focused on the economic activities of South Asia. In 2016, a SAARC summit in Pakistan was canceled following boycotts by India, Afghanistan, Bhutan, and Bangladesh, causing some to worry about the future of the organization.
SCO	2015	Pakistan and India signed on to be full members of the Shanghai Cooperation Organization in 2015, with the process for instatement ending in 2017. The organization shares many interests with Pakistan, and the new membership has been supported within Pakistan and the other members of the organization.
United Nations	1947	Main article: Pakistan and the United Nations

== See also ==
- History of Pakistan
- Ministry of Foreign Affairs
- List of diplomatic missions in Pakistan
- List of diplomatic missions of Pakistan
- List of foreign politicians of Pakistani origin
- List of diplomatic visits to Pakistan since 2024
- Visa requirements for Pakistani citizens
- Pakistan and the Commonwealth of Nations
- Pakistan and the United Nations
- Public diplomacy of Pakistan
