= List of ambassadors of Mexico to India =

Ambassador of Mexico to India
- Flag of Mexico
- Incumbent; Federico Salas Lotfe since 12 September 2019
- Nominator: President of Mexico

The ambassador of Mexico to India (Spanish:Embajador de México ante la India) is the highest ranking diplomatic representative of the United Mexican States to India. The mission is hosted in New Delhi, and is currently concurrent with Bangladesh, Sri Lanka, Pakistan, Nepal, and the Maldives. Mexico entered diplomatic relations with India on 1 August 1950, after the establishment of the modern nation of India January of that year.

== List of diplomatic representatives to India ==
The following list should include every head of the legation recognized by the Mexican Secretariat of Foreign Affairs.

Diplomatic representatives of Mexico in New Delhi
Representative	Nomination/ratification	Presentation of credentials	End of mission	Nominated by
Emilio Portes Gil	4 October 1951 (Note: Appointed to assist India in a celebration of the anniversary of the creation of its new constitution; considered first Mexican diplomatic representative in the country)	— (Note: No date)	1 December 1951	Miguel Alemán Valdés
Luis Fernández McGregor (interim)	1 December 1951	N/A	15 May 1956	Miguel Alemán Valdés
Salvador Pardo Bolland (interim)	1 May 1956	N/A	10 September 1962	Adolfo Ruiz Cortines
Octavio Paz	26 April 1962 (Note: Concurrent with Afghanistan and Sri Lanka (then Ceylon))	10 September 1962	18 October 1968	Adolfo López Mateos
Carlos César Gutiérrez Macías	9 December 1968	—	16 May 1977	Gustavo Díaz Ordaz
José Antonio Lara Villarreal	1 July 1977 (Note: Accredited to Sri Lanka)	2 February 1978	23 May 1979	José López Portillo
Jesús García Chávez (interim)	23 May 1979	N/A	8 July 1980	José López Portillo
Graciela de la Lama Gómez	9 July 1980	2 March 1982 (Note: Accredited to Bangladesh)	16 March 1988	José López Portillo
Luis Dantón Rodríguez Jaime	16 March 1988	1 July 1988	15 June 1989	Miguel de la Madrid Hurtado
Pedro González-Rubio Sánchez	28 April 1990	7 July 1990	9 May 1995	Carlos Salinas de Gortari
Edmundo Font López	10 March 1995	11 September 1995	18 June 1999	Ernesto Zedillo Ponce de León
Pedro González-Rubio Sánchez	16 July 1999 (Note: Accredited to Sri Lanka)	11 February 2000	13 December 2001	Ernesto Zedillo Ponce de León
Julio Faesler Carlisle	6 August 2001	22 January 2002	31 October 2004	Vicente Fox Quesada
Rogelio Granguillhome Morfín	8 November 2004	18 February 2005	November 2009	Vicente Fox Quesada
Jaime Nualart	8 October 2009	20 November 2009	2015	Felipe Calderón Hinojosa
Melba Pría Olavarrieta	3 March 2015	30 April 2015	30 November 2018	Enrique Peña Nieto
Federico Salas Lotfe	31 July 2019	12 September 2019	Current (as of 2021)	Andrés Manuel López Obrador
Federico Salas Lotfe	31 July 2019	12 September 2019	Current (as of 2021)	Claudia Sheinbaum

=== Representatives of Mexico to Pakistan (Concurrent with mission in Iran) ===
Representative	Nomination/ratification	Presentation of credentials	End of mission	Nominated by
José Alfonso Zegbe Camarena	14 December 2016	11 August 2017	30 November 2018	Enrique Peña Nieto
Guillermo Alejandro Puente Ordorica	28 July 2020	11 February 2022	Current (as of 2023)	Andrés Manuel López Obrador
Guillermo Alejandro Puente Ordorica	28 July 2020	11 February 2022	Current (as of 2023)	Claudia Sheinbaum

== See also ==
- India–Mexico relations
- Mexico–Pakistan relations
- Bangladesh–Mexico relations
