= Arab Pakistani =

Arab Pakistani or Pakistani Arab may refer to:

- Arabs in Pakistan
- Iraqi Biradari
- Multiracial people of Arab and Pakistani descent in any country

== See also ==
- Arab–Pakistan relations
