= Pakistan–Ukraine relations =

- Pakistan: Ukraine

Diplomatic mission
- Embassy of Pakistan, Kyiv: Embassy of Ukraine, Islamabad

Pakistan and Ukraine formally established diplomatic relations in 1992, one year after the Ukrainian Declaration of Independence. In recent years, the two countries have increasingly developed close economic and military ties. In 2021, their bilateral trade turnover stood at US$411.8 million.

The Pakistani government has an embassy in Kyiv, while the Ukrainian government has an embassy in Islamabad and honorary consulates in Karachi and Lahore. Since the Russian invasion of Ukraine began in 2022, Pakistan has mostly voiced support for Ukrainian territorial integrity, but has avoided criticizing Russia directly. Though it initially limited aid to Ukraine for humanitarian purposes only, some reports have alleged that Pakistan has delivered military equipment to Ukraine by funneling it through NATO countries, particularly the United Kingdom; the Pakistani Ministry of Foreign Affairs has consistently denied supplying armaments to the Ukrainian military and has emphasised its neutrality in the conflict repeatedly. Pakistan's government has also called for a peaceful resolution via bilateral negotiations, noting that the country has been affected by the lack of Ukrainian wheat imports since Russia's invasion—a shortcoming that was temporarily relieved by the Black Sea Grain Initiative, which expired in July 2023.

== Overview ==
=== Economic ties ===
The bilateral trade between the two countries started on 16 March 1992. In 2021, the volume of Pakistan-Ukraine trade turnover had reached US$411.814 million.

Pakistan is also a major importer of Ukrainian wheat, almost 40 percent of Pakistan’s wheat imports in 2021 came from Ukraine.

=== Military ties ===
In the late 1990s, Ukraine sold Pakistan 320 Ukrainian T-80UD main battle tanks in a deal worth US$650 million. According to Kyiv Post, the deal saved Kharkiv Malyshev Tank Factory from bankruptcy.

According to Stockholm International Peace Research Institute (SIPRI) databases, from 1991 to 2020, Ukraine completed arms contracts with Pakistan with a total value of nearly US$1.6 billion. During that period, Pakistan was described as Ukraine's biggest arms customer right next to Russia, China, India, and Thailand.

In December 2008, Pakistan signed an agreement with Ukraine to purchase four Il-78 refueling aircraft outfitted with Russian-designed UPAZ refueling pods. All of the purchased aircraft were delivered by 2012.

In June 2020, Ukrspecexport and Pakistani officials signed a multimillion-dollar contract to upgrade one of Pakistan Air Force's Il-78 aerial refueling tanker aircraft. The aircraft was modernised by Ukroboronprom’s Nikolaev Aircraft Repair Plant and was delivered back to Pakistan by 4 February 2022. Ukrspetsexport called this event an important stage of cooperation with Pakistani partners.

In February 2021, UkrOboronProm signed a contract worth US$85.6 million with Pakistani officials to repair T-80UD main battle tanks of the Pakistan army. The newly signed contract was also a sign of relief for Malyshev Factory as the enterprise was suffering from debt worth US$67 million since the start of the year 2021.

== Pakistan and the Russian invasion of Ukraine ==
=== Humanitarian aid ===
During the war, Pakistan sent humanitarian aid to help the people of Ukraine affected by Russia's invasion of Ukraine in 2022. Pakistan Air Force C-130 Hercules aircraft were flown to Poland where the aid was dispatched to help Ukrainian civilians. Ukraine's foreign minister Dmytro Kuleba, during his visit to Pakistan, thanked Pakistan for providing humanitarian aid to Ukraine, especially at a time when Pakistan itself was struggling politically and economically.

=== Position on the Russo-Ukrainian War ===
Pakistan supports Ukraine's sovereignty and territorial integrity. Ukraine's foreign minister Dmytro Kuleba, during his visit to Pakistan, thanked Pakistan for supporting Ukraine’s stance on its sovereignty and security. Pakistan has also been largely consistent in abstaining on UN resolutions on Russia, and has avoided criticising Moscow. Throughout the war, Pakistan adopted a neutral stance and avoided taking sides of any of the parties involved in the conflict. Pakistan has also stressed that negotiations are the only way through which the Ukraine-Russia conflict can be resolved. Pakistan's foreign minister Bilawal Bhutto Zardari says that Pakistan hopes for a peaceful resolution of the Russia-Ukraine conflict.

On 20 July 2023, Ukraine's foreign minister Dmytro Kuleba arrived in Pakistan on an official visit. He was offered exceptional protocol, a gesture rarely bestowed upon dignitaries from friendly nations visiting Pakistan. Kuleba was able to secure Pakistan's support for Ukraine's effort to preserve the grain corridor. On 27 July 2023, Pakistan's foreign minister Bilawal Bhutto Zardari held a telephone conversation with Russia's foreign minister Sergey Lavrov and urged him to restore Black Sea Grain Initiative.

==== Allegations ====
In August 2025, Ukrainian President Volodymyr Zelenskyy said that foreign mercenaries, including individuals from Pakistan, were fighting alongside Russian forces in northeastern Ukraine. During a visit to the frontline in the Kharkiv region, Zelenskyy highlighted Pakistan among several countries allegedly involved, stating, “Our warriors in this sector are reporting the participation of mercenaries from China, Tajikistan, Uzbekistan, Pakistan, and African countries in the war. We will respond.” Pakistan's Foreign Ministry rejected the allegation, calling it "baseless and unfounded".

=== Military assistance ===
During the war, the United Kingdom purchased an unspecified number of 122mm howitzer projectiles from Pakistan, which were later supplied by the United Kingdom to Ukraine. Later on, M107 155-mm projectiles along with M4A2 propellant charges manufactured by Pakistan Ordnance Factories were also spotted being used by the armed forces of Ukraine on the front lines. Experts note that it is very likely that one of Ukraine's NATO allies may have purchased ammunition from Pakistan and supplied it to Ukraine.

The Economic Times, an Indian newspaper, reported that Pakistan was reportedly planning to dispatch 159 containers of ammunition in early half of January, out of which 146 containers of ammunition were delivered by the later half of same month. The containers contained 155-mm projectiles, M4A2 propelling bag charges, M82 primers and PDM fuses, and were transferred to Ukraine through a port in Poland. The newspaper later also reported that Pakistan had supplied more than 10,000 missiles for the BM-21 Grad MLRS of armed forces of Ukraine in February 2022. BW Businessworld, an Indian magazine, reported that DMI Associates, an agent for Pakistan Ordnance Factories, has signed an MoU with the Government Strategic Reserves Agency of Poland with Polish firm PHU Lechmar LLC acting as an intermediary purchaser, and Tradent Global Solutions, based in Canada, acting as an intermediary consultant. The magazine also reports that Pakistan is in the process of exporting Anza Mark-II to Poland for transport to Ukraine, and Millennium Technologies of Karachi and Omida Sea and Air of Poland are negotiating the transportation agreement. On 6 March 2023, the magazine reported that Pakistan had reportedly shipped 162 containers with ammunition, including artillery rockets, through a port in Germany to Ukraine. The magazine also reported that UK’s ministry of defence signed a pact with Pakistan Ordinance Factories recently to supply ammunition to Ukraine. Dr. Riina Kionka, European Union's ambassador to Pakistan, in an interview with local media in Pakistan on 21 February 2023 said that Pakistan has been helping Ukraine in its protracted conflict with Russia by sending military and humanitarian aid.

However, Pakistan's Ministry of Foreign Affairs has formally denied reports of arms supply to Ukraine. Ukrainian Foreign Minister Dmytro Kuleba also said "No arms deal with Pakistan" during his visit to Pakistan, rejecting media speculations.

== See also ==
- Pakistanis in Ukraine
- Foreign relations of Pakistan
- Foreign relations of Ukraine
- Al-Khalid MBT - A Pakistani Tank with Ukrainian equipment
- List of foreign aid to Ukraine during the Russo-Ukrainian War
