= Egypt–Pakistan relations =

- Pakistan: Egypt

Egypt–Pakistan relations refers to the bilateral relations between the Arab Republic of Egypt and the Islamic Republic of Pakistan. Modern relations date back to 1947 when the founder of Pakistan Muhammad Ali Jinnah paid a farewell visit to Egypt on a special invitation by King Fuad II. Egypt has an embassy in Islamabad and Pakistan has an embassy in Cairo. Both countries are members of the Organisation of Islamic Cooperation (OIC) and the "D8". Pakistan and Egypt are both designated Major Non-NATO allies, giving them access to certain levels of hardware and surplus military equipment from the United States.

Both Egypt and Pakistan have a close nationalist bond; the two nations were founded as modern nation-states in an era of nationalism, with a pre-dominant Muslim population. Modern Egypt regards its founder as Muhammad Ali of Egypt while Muhammad Ali Jinnah is regarded as Pakistan's founder.

== History ==
=== Antiquity ===
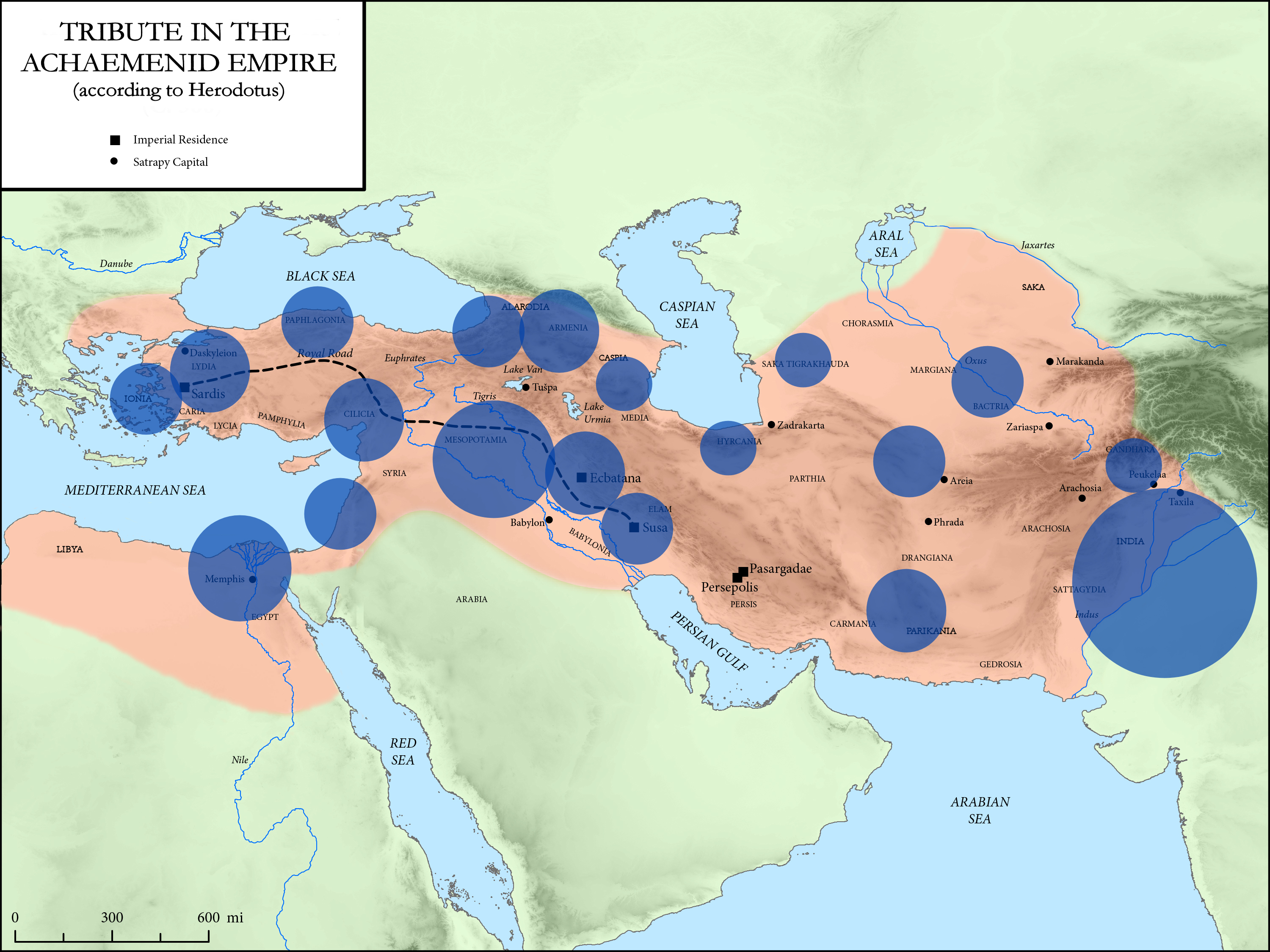
Map showing the distribution of Achaemenid tax revenues, according to the Greek historian Herodotus

The regions that comprise today's Egypt and Pakistan have been under the rule of contiguous Eurasian polities at various points in history, as they are both part of the Greater Middle East. The Persian Achaemenid Empire, which spanned (among other regions) the area between the Balkans and the area of the Indus River (known to the Persians as Hind) at its height, conquered the regions comprising modern-day Egypt, as well as the Pakistani provinces of Balochistan and Khyber Pakhtunkhwa during the reign of Darius I. They had also both become part of the Umayyad Caliphate during the Islamic Golden Age, allowing for the spread of Islam and Arabization to both regions.

Egypt and Pakistan have had political, commercial and cultural relations since antiquity, including long-lasting trade through the Red Sea-Indian Ocean maritime routes and conquest by the Persians, Alexander the Great and Arabs. The ancient Greeks commented that the people living along the Indus River were most similar to ancient Egyptians in appearance.

=== Modern Relations ===
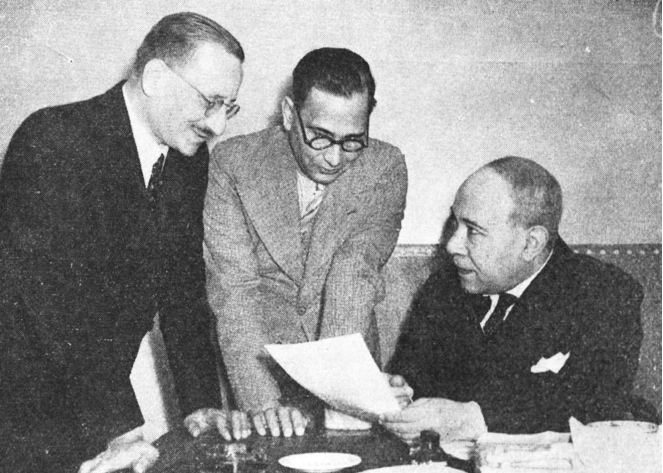
From left to right: Abdurrahman Siddiqi, Choudhry Khaliquzzaman, and Muhammad Ali Alluba, Cairo, 1938

Members of the Pakistan movement supported Egyptian demands for Independence against British colonialism. As Muhammad Ali Jinnah put it: "The liberation of Egypt is our liberation and success in Cairo will have its echo in Karachi". A treaty of friendship was signed between the two countries on 28 August 1951. However, Egypt felt that Pakistan was too close to the British Commonwealth. After the Commonwealth Prime Ministers' Conference in January 1951. Liaquat Ali Khan stopped by Cairo and publicly supported Egypt in the Anglo-Egyptian negotiations. Demonstrations broke out in Pakistan in support for the abrogation of the 1936 Anglo-Egyptian treaty in 1951 and demand for the complete withdrawal of British forces on the Suez Canal. Meanwhile, the government urged moderation. Pakistani Foreign Minister Zafrulla Khan told warned both London and Cairo to avoid clashes. Pakistan worked behind the scenes to support the Egyptian viewpoint in negotiations between Cairo and London during the following couple of years.

Pakistan was a member of the Baghdad pact in the 1950s, a pro-capitalist Cold-War alliance of which Britain was a member. However, Egypt was skeptical and against committing to any formal Western military alliance. Egyptian president Gamal Abdel Nasser was a critic of the pact; his close relationship with Indian prime minister Nehru following the Bandung Conference angered many Pakistanis.

While Pakistan had a foreign policy based on Islamic unity and anticommunism, Nasser was against pan-Islamism, stating privately that "I do not want to use Islam in international politics". A smilar notion was also held by Muhammed Ali Jinnah according to Pakistani historian, Umair Khan. While Nasser's nationalization of the Suez Canal in 1956 was received with jubilation by the Pakistani public, the government was caught between supporting its relationship between Britain on one hand and Egypt on the other, thus chose a muted response. Foreign Minister Hamidul Huq Chowdhury stated that while he was not against the nationalization per se, he supported preserving the rights of canal users with discrimination. Pakistan's middle ground approach was harshly criticized in the Egyptian press.

Once the Suez Crisis started, Pakistani Prime Minister Huseyn Suhrawardy condemned the aggression against Egypt. The Pakistani President Iskander Mirza delivered a statement to the Iranian Majilis on 1 November also condemning the attack. Mirza organized a meeting between the prime minister and foreign ministers of Iraq and Iran in Tehran in the first week of November, calling for the return of Israeli forces to the 1949 armistice lines and the termination of the British invasion. However, Suhrawardy was completely against a Pakistani withdrawal from the pact. Nasser, on his end, approved Indian troop involvement in UNEF but was against Pakistani involvement, who offered to send a full battalion to Suez. The Egyptian embassy explained that Pakistan was not on the list submitted by the UN Security Council for approval and that Egypt was against any Muslim troop involvement to avoid them being targeted. Nasser also rejected Suhrawardy's request for a meeting on the next Baghdad pact meeting, which insulted the prime minister.

Relations attempted to normalize following two events in 1958, the formation of the United Arab Republic with the unification of Syria and Egypt as well as the 1958 Pakistani military coup. Nasser's visited to Pakistan in April 1960 and President Ayub Khan visit to Egypt in November 1960 helped improve relations, though they remained rocky, especially when the UAR abstained from a vote on a Security Council resolution favorable to Pakistan on the Kashmir issue. Though relations were cordial during the June 1965 visit of the Pakistani president to the UAR, the UAR accused Pakistan of supporting the royalists in the North Yemeni civil war while Egypt supported the republicans, though Pakistan argued that the weapons it sold to Saudi Arabia, who did support the royalists, were sold before the war broke out.

During the 1967 and 1973 wars, Pakistan and sent Egypt military aide, technicians, and personnel to aid the Egyptian military at war with Israel. Pakistani pilots such as Saiful Azam and Sattar Alvi fought for Arab forces during the 1967 war and 1973 war. During war Egypt war with Israel, Pakistan Army sent weapons and fighter planes to Egypt.

In 1974, President of Egypt Anwar Sadat visited Pakistan to attend the second OIC meeting held in Lahore, Punjab, and generally supported Pakistan's plans to become a nuclear power. But the relations with Pakistan deteriorated when Pakistan initiated ties with the former Soviet Union. The worsening of relations of Pakistan with the United States further played a key role.

Nonetheless, the relations were normal with Egypt after the removal of Prime minister Zulfikar Ali Bhutto. In the 1980s, President Hosni Mubarak and President Zia-ul-Haq further enhanced the relations; Egypt also played a vital role in Soviet–Afghan War where Egypt widely provided manpower (see Afghan Arabs) and military equipment to Afghan mujahideen in their fight against the Soviets. In 1988–1990 and 1993–1996, Egypt's relations were soured with Pakistan Peoples Party formerly led by Benazir Bhutto who was generally close with the Soviet Union.

In May 2023, Pakistan praised Egypt for boycotting a G20 tourism meeting held by India in Kashmir.

== 1995 Egyptian embassy bombing ==
In 1995, a car bombing in Islamabad targeted the Egyptian Embassy, which the Egyptian Islamic Jihad claimed responsibility for. A massive manhunt was initiated by the FIA and all assailants were arrested in 2001 and extradited to Egypt.

== Military relations ==
The Pakistani and Egyptian militaries maintain close relations in the fields of defence production, and the two nations frequently maintain contacts of high-level delegations of military chiefs. In a meeting with General Raheel Sharif, Egypt's president affirmed his wish to further promote military co-operation with Pakistan.

== Economic relations ==
Egypt and Pakistan have agreed to enhance the existing co-operation between the two countries which include economic and commercial relations, investment opportunities, co-operation in public and civil services, health sector, agriculture, and postal. Both countries would further enhance their co-operation in the alternative energy sector particularly wind power generation.

There are over 700 Pakistanis living in Egypt, mainly in Cairo and Alexandria. Relations are helped by the fact that both states have Muslim majorities and there is a strong people-to-people contact between both countries.

== See also ==
- Foreign relations of Egypt
- Foreign relations of Pakistan

== Bibliography ==
- Bishku, Michael B. (Summer 1992). "In Search of Identity and Security: Pakistan and the Middle East, 1947-77" (PDF). Journal of Conflict Studies. 12 (3).
- Chaudhri, Mohammed Ahsen (1957). "Pakistan and the Muslim World". Pakistan Horizon. 10 (3): 156–166. ISSN 0030-980X.<
- Dar, Saeeduddin Ahmad (1990). "Anglo-Egyptian Dispute and Pakistan". Pakistan Horizon. 43 (3): 59–66. ISSN 0030-980X.
- Faheem, Farrukh; Xingang, Wang; Wasim, Muhammad; Hussain, Sajjad (2021). "Identity and interests: History of Pakistan's Foreign Policy and the Middle Eastern Muslim States, 1947 to 1956". Cogent Social Sciences. 7 (1). doi:10.1080/23311886.2021.1967567.
- Hashmi, Sohail H. (2011). "'Zero Plus Zero Plus Zero': Pakistan, the Baghdad Pact, and the Suez Crisis". The International History Review. 33 (3): 525–544. ISSN 0707-5332.
- Khan, N. (2011). Egyptian-Indian Nationalist Collaboration and the British Empire. Springer. ISBN 9780230339514.
- Khan, Hafeez-ur-Rahman (1960). "Pakistan's Relations with the U.A.R". Pakistan Horizon. 13 (3): 209–226. ISSN 0030-980X.
- Mahmoud, Sara Mahmoud Abdelhalim (2025). "Egyptian-Pakistani Relations during the Era of President Anwar Sadat 1970–1981 (Sadat – Bhutto)". Asian Journal of Middle Eastern and Islamic Studies. 19 (1): 93–113. doi:10.1080/25765949.2025.2514294.
- O'Halloran, Erin M.B. (2025). East of Empire: Egypt, India, and the World Between the Wars. Stanford University Press. ISBN 9781503640542.
- Qureshi, Khalida (1966). "Pakistan and the Middle East". Pakistan Horizon. 19 (2): 156–166. ISSN 0030-980X.
- Wellhausen, Julius (1927). The Arab Kingdom and Its Fall. Translated by Margaret Graham Weir. Calcutta: University of Calcutta.
