= Malta–Pakistan relations =

- Pakistan: Malta

Malta–Pakistan relations are the bilateral relations between Malta and Pakistan. Neither country has a resident ambassador. Pakistan is concurrently accredited to Malta through its embassy in Tunis with an Honorary Consulate in Attard (Malta) since September 2015. Both countries are full members of the Commonwealth of Nations.

== High level interaction ==
Bilateral meetings have always emphasized the need for increasing commercial and economic collaboration, chiefly through encouraging the exchange of trade delegations. In a meeting in Valletta in 2007 between the respective Foreign Ministers, the two countries concurred to "continue the ongoing cooperation between the two countries in the United Nations and other international forums as well and reviewed bilateral ties with a view to strengthening relations between Pakistan and Malta in all spheres, especially trade and investment."

== Aviation ==
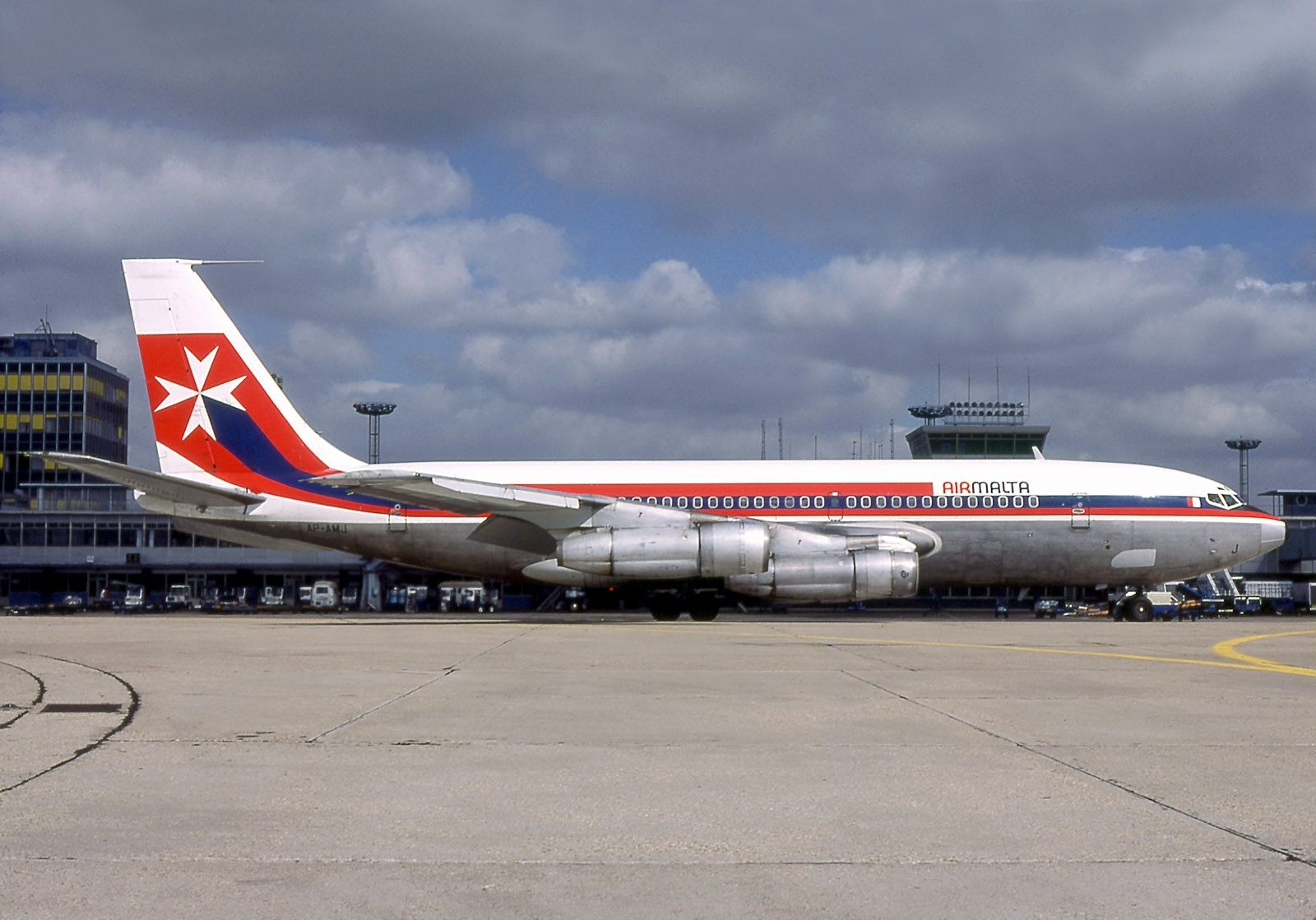
An Air Malta Boeing 720B with Pakistani registration AP-AMJ, leased from Pakistan International Airlines in the 1970s

Malta's national airlines, Air Malta, was established in the 1970s with the help and expertise of Pakistan International Airlines (PIA). At that time, the government of Malta had made several attempts to establish a national flag carrier with the possible assistance of an established foreign airline.

Accordingly, PIA emerged with the most favourable contract conditions and upon commencement, offered to invest 20% in shares. PIA provided a management team which would run the airline from its inception. The early generation of Air Malta pilots, as well as flight and ground engineers, owe their training and initial knowledge to PIA. The first batches of novices were dispatched to Pakistan where they undertook extensive training. Two Boeing 720s were also leased from PIA for a five-year period. In 1973, PIA assigned a general manager and four senior managers to Air Malta who would be responsible for the airline's marketing, financing, flight and ground operations.

== Human trafficking ==
Malta is a major transit point onwards to the southern reaches of Italy and Spain. Pakistan's Federal Investigation Agency (FIA) also corroborated the modus operandi.

This trafficking network eventually has resulted in widespread arrests. In December 2002, a boat transporting approximately 110 undocumented Pakistanis was stopped by the Maltese Army and the illegal passengers were detained under the immigration act. Relatives of the detainees pleaded with the Pakistani government to provide consular assistance and other relief.

== Fundraisers for flood victims ==
Following the 2010 Pakistan floods, a dinner was patronised by the President of Malta in support of and as a mark of solidarity with the victims. This flood support initiative has been quoted as "a milestone in the history of Pakistan and Malta relations." Several fundraisers have since been organized by members of Malta's political elite, corporate sector and entertainment industry. A substantial figure was generated as a result of a donation drive in July 2016 for victims of the deluge that ravaged northern Pakistan.

== See also ==
- Foreign relations of Malta
- Foreign relations of Pakistan
- Malta and the Non-Aligned Movement
