= Public diplomacy of Pakistan =

Public diplomatic goals of Pakistan

Public diplomacy of Pakistan refers to a set of foreign relations, in particular non-military mutual trust and productive relationships with the other nations for secure international relations or to maintain a hybrid legal system, with which federal government, explicitly civil authority, private or state-owned agencies, groups and an individual can directly or indirectly influence public opinions in any form of political relations, involving traditional diplomatic consensus. Pakistani citizens also seem to practice cultural diplomacy to develop the ideals and sponsor government initiatives in an attempt to build broad support for their diplomatic goals.

Since people's diplomacy is practiced publicly, the country's international ranking appears to have been stabilised compared to the previous years due to the multiple military coup attempts in the past, which involved the dictators weaken democratic status of the nation, leading the citizens to not raise their public diplomatic concerns.

== Overview ==
In the recent years, the Ministry of Foreign Affairs of government of Pakistan took several initiatives to increase the scope of public diplomacy. It reorganised foreign policies by establishing Public Diplomacy Division between 2019 and 2020. It was primarily introduced to formulate state policy, build a favourable environment, promote national interest, and implement policies within the country and abroad. These measures, according to the government are aimed at to highlight diplomatic interactions within the governmental and non-governmental actors.

=== Objectives ===
In 2020, the federal government introduced Public Diplomacy Consultative Group to conduct negotiations between governmental and non-governmental actors such as representatives and groups, including decision-makers and public opinion leaders to diversify culture, economy, political stability and to utilize scientific method to reach out to the other nations through means of communications.

== Analysis ==
In the past, Pakistan remained among the other nations that have not benefited from public diplomacy over several other issues, including domestic instability and security challenges, despite being a multi-cultural society with diverse culture. In January 2020, the prime minister of Pakistan formed new divisions to implement public and information policy, including media staff within the country and aboard. The Strategic Communications Division (SCD), a new branch of the Ministry of Foreign Affairs, comprising all the senior officers at federal-level was also established, designed to adopt public diplomacy in specific areas.

The Permanent Representative of Pakistan to the United Nations, New York, London, Berlin, Beijing, and Manama set up diplomatic programs to promote public diplomacy of the country.

== See also ==
- United Nations peacekeeping missions involving Pakistan
