= List of diplomatic visits to Pakistan =

This is a list of head of states and head of governments who have visited the Islamic Republic of Pakistan. These visits are classified as state visit, official visit or working visits by the Ministry of Foreign Affairs of Pakistan.

== 2024 ==
Country	Title	Leader	Date/s	Visit type	Engagements	Ref.
Iran	President	Ebrahim Raisi	22-24 April	Official	Met with President Asif Ali Zardari and Prime Minister Shehbaz Sharif in Islamabad. Also visited Lahore and Karachi.	
Azerbaijan	President	Ilham Aliyev	11-12 July	State	Met with President and Prime Minister of Pakistan.	
Malaysia	Prime Minister	Anwar Ibrahim	2-4 October	Official	Met with President and Prime Minister of Pakistan.	
China	Premier	Li Qiang	14-16 October	Official	Attended 23rd Meeting of the Council of Heads of Government of Member States of the Shanghai Cooperation Organisation.	
Belarus	Prime Minister	Roman Golovchenko	15-16 October	Working	Attended 23rd Meeting of the Council of Heads of Government of Member States of the Shanghai Cooperation Organisation.	
Kazakhstan	Prime Minister	Oljhas Bektenov	15-16 October	Working	Attended 23rd Meeting of the Council of Heads of Government of Member States of the Shanghai Cooperation Organisation.	
Kyrgyzstan	Chairman of the Cabinet of Ministers	Akylbek Japarov	15-16 October	Working	Attended 23rd Meeting of the Council of Heads of Government of Member States of the Shanghai Cooperation Organisation.	
Russia	Prime Minister	Mikhail Mishustin	15-16 October	Working	Attended 23rd Meeting of the Council of Heads of Government of Member States of the Shanghai Cooperation Organisation.	
Tajikistan	Prime Minister	Kohir Rasulzoda	15-16 October	Working	Attended 23rd Meeting of the Council of Heads of Government of Member States of the Shanghai Cooperation Organisation.	
Mongolia	Prime Minister	Luvsannamsrain Oyun-Erdene	15-17 October	Working	Attended 23rd Meeting of the Council of Heads of Government of Member States of the Shanghai Cooperation Organisation.	
Uzbekistan	Prime Minister	Abdulla Aripov	16 October	Working	Attended 23rd Meeting of the Council of Heads of Government of Member States of the Shanghai Cooperation Organisation.	
Belarus	President	Aleksandr Lukashenko	25-27 November	Official	Met with Prime Minister of Pakistan.	

== 2025 ==
Country	Title	Leader	Date/s	Visit type	Engagements	Ref.
Turkey	President	Recep Tayyip Erdoğan	12-13 February	State	Met with President Asif Ali Zardari and Prime Minister Shehbaz Sharif.	
Iran	President	Masoud Pezeshkian	2-3 August	State	Met with President Asif Ali Zardari and Prime Minister Shehbaz Sharif.	
Jordan	King	Abdullah II	15-16 November	State	Met with President Asif Ali Zardari and Prime Minister Shehbaz Sharif.	
Kyrgyzstan	President	Sadyr Japarov	3-4 December	State	First Kyrgyz President to visit Pakistan, since 2005. Met with President Asif Ali Zardari and Prime Minister Shehbaz Sharif.	
Indonesia	President	Prabowo Subianto	8-9 December	Official	Met with President Asif Ali Zardari and Prime Minister Shehbaz Sharif.	
UAE	President	Mohamed bin Zayed Al Nahyan	26 December	Working	First Emirati President to pay a diplomatic visit to Pakistan, since 2005. Few hours stay. Held formal meeting with Prime Minister Shehbaz Sharif at Nur Khan Airbase, Rawalpindi.	

== 2026 ==
Country	Title	Leader	Date/s	Visit type	Engagements	Ref.
Kazakhstan	President	Kassym-Jomart Tokayev	3-4 February	State	First Kazakh President to visit Pakistan since 2003. Met with President Asif Ali Zardari and Prime Minister Shehbaz Sharif.	
Uzbekistan	President	Shavkat Mirziyoyev	5-6 February	State	Met with President Asif Ali Zardari and Prime Minister Shehbaz Sharif.	
Iran	President	Masoud Pezeshkian	23 June	Official	Met with President Asif Ali Zardari and Prime Minister Shehbaz Sharif.	

== See also ==
- Foreign relations of Pakistan
