= Bangladesh–Mexico relations =

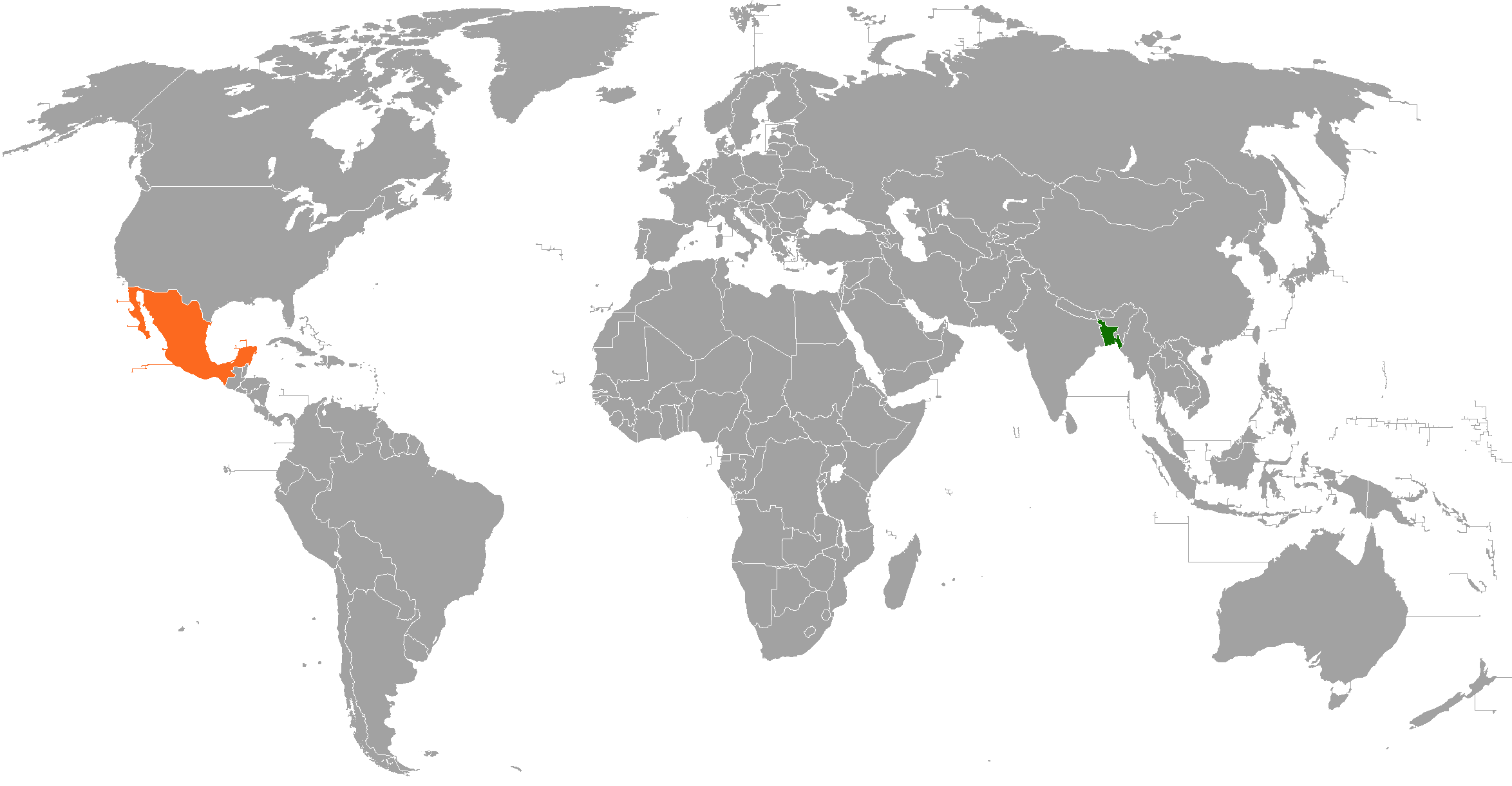

- Bangladesh: Mexico

The nations of Bangladesh and Mexico established diplomatic relations in 1975. Both nations are members of the United Nations and the World Trade Organization.

== History ==
Diplomatic relations between the two countries were officially established on 8 July 1975, four years after Bangladesh gained independence from Pakistan. Initial relations between both nations have taken place primarily in multinational organization such as the United Nations.

In 1981, Bangladeshi President Abdus Sattar visited Mexico to attend the North–South Summit in Cancún. In 2011, Bangladeshi Vice Foreign Minister Mohamed Mijarul Quayes paid a visit to Mexico and met with his counterpart Undersecretary Lourdes Aranda Bezaury to discuss promoting greater exchanges and cooperation actions between both countries, with the purpose of strengthening their bilateral relationship. In 2012, Bangladesh opened its first resident embassy in Mexico City.

In 2015, Bangladeshi Minister of State Shahriar Alam paid a visit to Mexico to celebrate 40 years of diplomatic relations both nations. While in Mexico, Minister Alam met with Mexican Foreign Minister José Antonio Meade and both officials highlighted the importance of intensifying political dialogue in order to increase economic, investment, and scientific and technological cooperation ties between both nations. In 2017, Mexican Senator Gabriela Cuevas Barron led a delegation to Bangladesh to attend the Inter-parliamentary Union Assembly which was held in Dhaka.

In 2021, both nations held their first meeting for bilateral consultation mechanism which was held virtually. That same year, Bangladeshi Minister of State Shahriar Alam returned to Mexico to attend the Bicentennial of Mexico's Independence. Minister Alam also held a bilateral meeting with the Secretary of Foreign Affairs Marcelo Ebrard.

== High-level visits ==
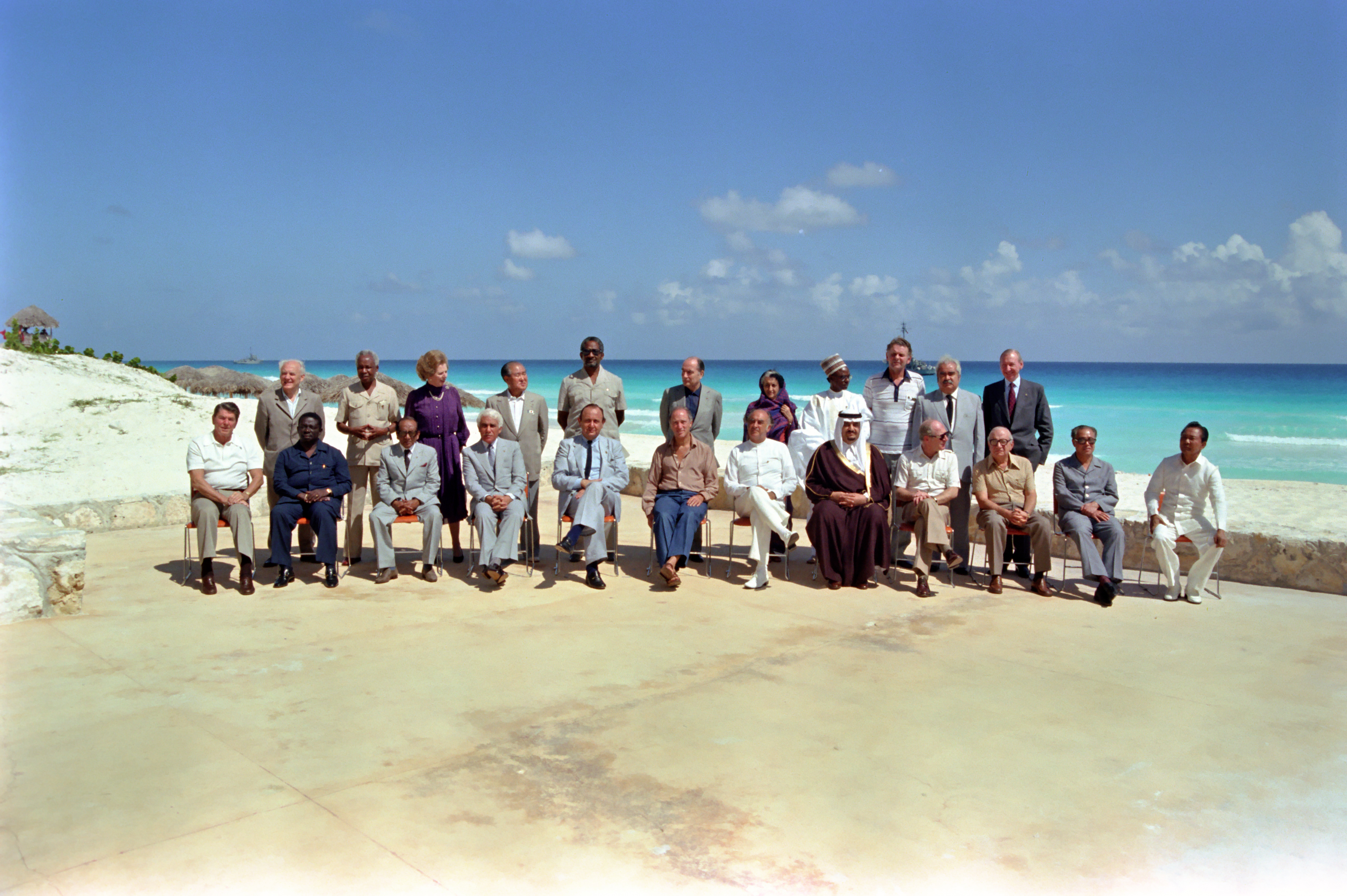
President Abdus Sattar attending the North–South Summit in Cancún along with his Mexican counterpart President José López Portillo; 1981.

High-level visits from Bangladesh to Mexico

- President Abdus Sattar (1981)
- Vice Foreign Minister Mohamed Mijarul Quayes (2011)
- Minister of Finance Abul Maal Abdul Muhith (2014)
- Minister of State for Foreign Affairs Shahriar Alam (2015, 2021)

High-level visits from Mexico to Bangladesh

- Senator Gabriela Cuevas Barron (2017)

== Bilateral agreements ==
Both nations have signed a few bilateral agreements such as an Agreement on the Elimination of Visa for Diplomatic and Official Passport Holders (2013); Agreement on Mutual Administrative Assistance in Customs Matters (2013) and a Memorandum of Understanding on Foreign Office Consultation (2015).

== Trade ==
In 2023, two-way trade between both nations amounted to US$674.6 million. Bangladesh's main exports to Mexico include: clothing, footwear, hides, kitchenware and gym equipment. Mexico's main exports to Bangladesh include: cotton, chemical based products, seeds, x-ray machines, medical equipment and telephones, including mobile phones.

== Resident diplomatic missions ==
- Bangladesh has an embassy in Mexico City.
- Mexico is accredited to Bangladesh from its embassy in New Delhi, India and maintains an honorary consulate in Dhaka.

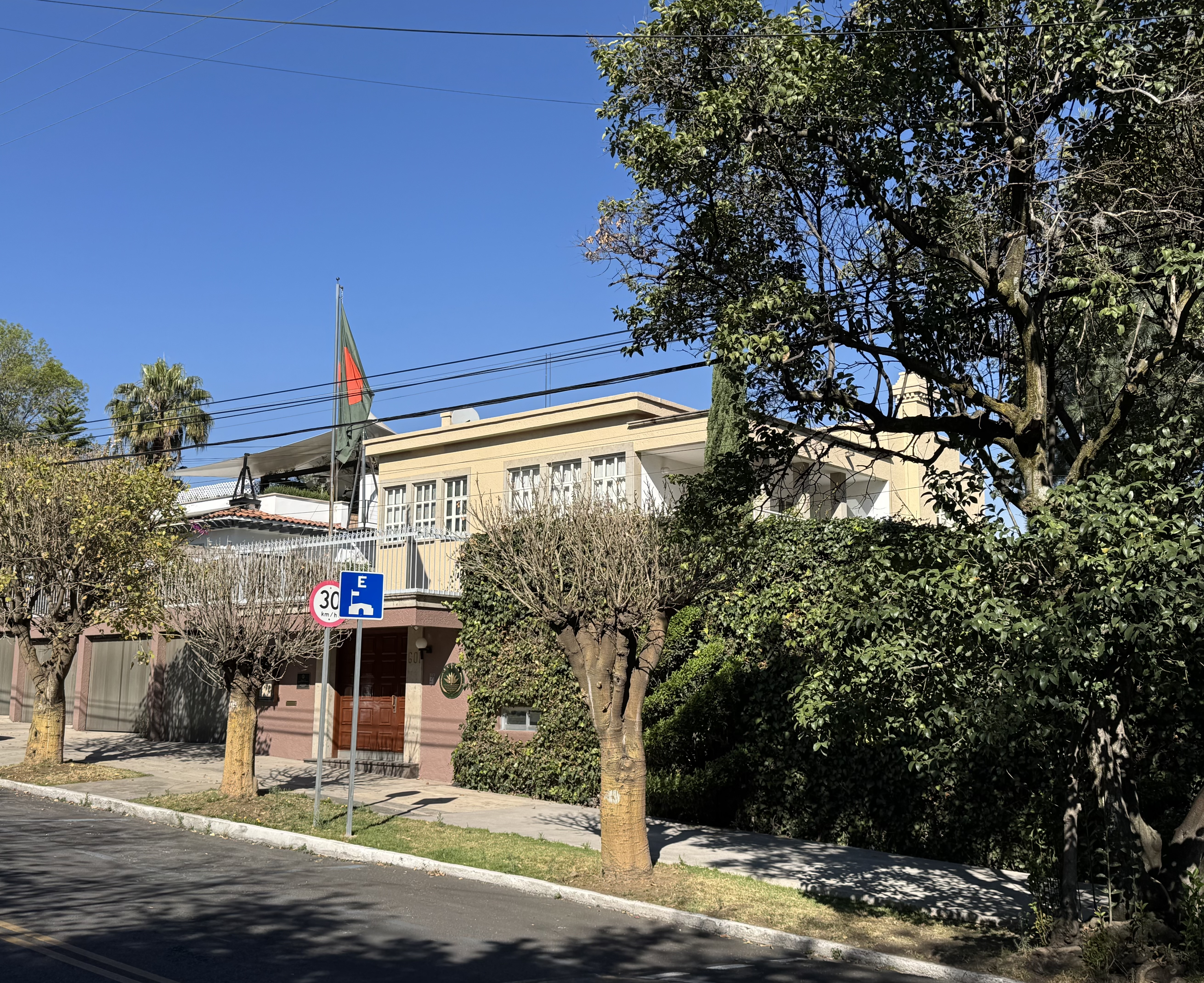
Embassy of Bangladesh in Mexico City

== Gallery ==
Bangladeshi Minister of State Shahriar Alam and Mexican Foreign Secretary José Antonio Meade in Mexico City; 2015

President of Bangladesh Mohammad Abdul Hamid accepting the credentials of Mexican Ambassador Federico Salas Lotfe; 2023

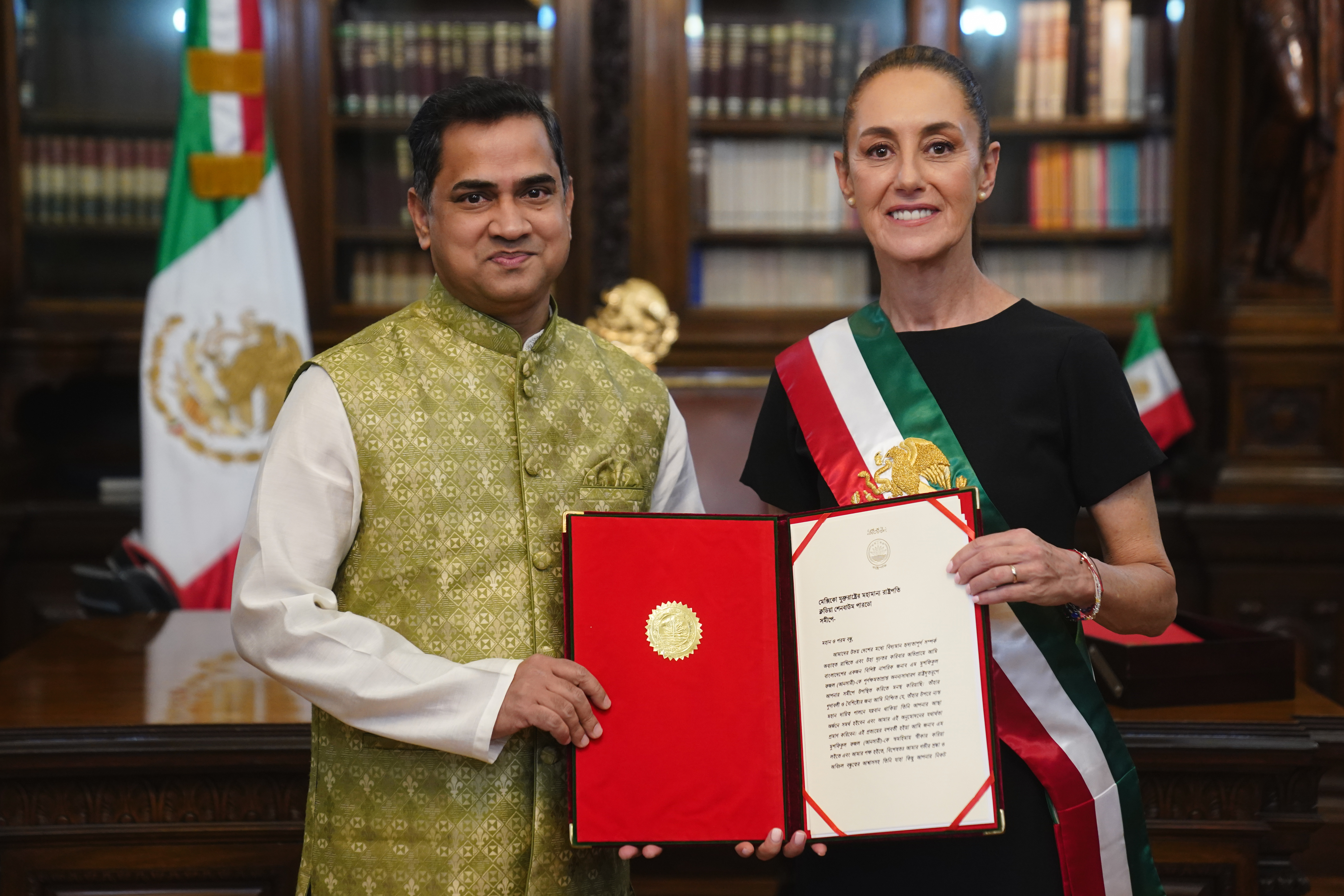
President of Mexico Claudia Sheinbaum accepting the credentials of Bangladeshi Ambassador Mushfiqul Fazal; 2025

Bangladesh's Victory Day celebration in Mexico City

Bangladesh booth at the Feria de las Culturas Amigas in Mexico City
