= Pakistan–Vietnam relations =

- Pakistan: Vietnam

Pakistan–Vietnam relations refers to the bilateral relations between Vietnam and Pakistan. The relationship is largely based on mutual trade and international political cooperation between the two countries. Pakistan is represented in Vietnam by its embassy in Hanoi, and Vietnam also maintains an embassy in Islamabad. During the Cold War, Pakistan (a non-aligned nation at the official level) maintained close ties with the United States-led Western Bloc to counter rival India's allegiance with the Soviet Union and Eastern Bloc. Throughout the 1960s and 1970s, the United States was involved in the Vietnam War against Soviet-backed North Vietnam (which emerged the victor of the war and its government superseded that of South Vietnam) while in the same time period, Pakistan had engaged in two major wars with neighbouring India in 1965 and 1971, the latter of which resulted in a devastating defeat for Pakistan and saw the emergence of an independent Bangladesh. Due to the fact that Pakistan was an ally with the United States and had begun to indirectly wage war against the Soviets in Afghanistan with heavy U.S.−backing, relations became strained between the two, with Pakistan closing its diplomatic mission in Vietnam in 1980 and Vietnam doing the same in 1984. However, relations greatly improved in the 2000s, and Pakistan reopened its embassy in Hanoi in October 2000. Vietnam also reopened its embassy in Islamabad and trade office in Karachi in December and November 2005, respectively. Relations between the two countries have continued to remain friendly, with Vietnam expressing an interest in increased economic and military cooperation with Pakistan. The heads of both nations have in recent times paid official visits to each other, with Pakistani President Pervez Musharraf visiting Vietnam in May 2001 and Vietnamese President Trần Đức Lương also paying an official visit to Pakistan in March 2004. Throughout the following decade, several visits were made by various Vietnamese and Pakistani ministries to each other. A major part of Pakistan's pursuit to enhance its relationship with Vietnam is outlined in Pakistan's "Vision East Asia" strategy. The emergence of such a strategy came as a result of Pakistan's desire to balance its relations with Vietnam and other East Asian / Southeast Asian states by making an effort to circumvent Pakistan's close relationship with China and Vietnam's growing relationship with India—the former being a cause of concern for Vietnam due to its tense relationship with China and the latter being a cause of concern for Pakistan due to its rivalry and history of armed conflict with India.

Vietnam provided US$50,000 worth of aid to Pakistan during the catastrophic 2010 floods.

== Trade links ==
In early 1998, Vietnam sent a group of businessmen to Pakistan, which had a meeting with the Ministry of Commerce of Pakistan and visited various factories and companies to study the economic environment and opportunities to do business with Pakistani companies.

Trade between the two countries increased from US$10 million in 1999 to US$150 million in 2008. Pakistan is Vietnam's largest tea importer. Vietnam's imports from Pakistan consist of cotton, leather and pharmaceutical products. Potential for imports from Pakistan include motorcycles, surgical instruments and investment in coal mining and aquaculture. Vietnam has also purchased military equipment and armaments from Pakistan, causing tensions in its relationship with India.

Meanwhile, Vietnam has the potential to export raw rubber and various rubber products and machinery to Pakistan.

In 2021, Pakistani-Vietnamese trade reached an all-time high of over $794 million, a boost of 54.41% from 2020.

== Political cooperation ==
In May 2001 General Pervez Musharraf, paid an official visit to Vietnam. In March 2004, President Trần Đức Lương, at the invitation of President Pervez Musharraf, also visited Pakistan. Pakistan considers Vietnam an important diplomatic partner, because of Vietnam full membership of ASEAN, and Vietnam support of Pakistan's bid to be a full dialogue partner of ASEAN. Therefore, under the Pakistan "East Asia Vision Strategy" foreign policy, Vietnam has the potential to promote Pakistan's mutual interests in ASEAN, whereas Pakistan supports Vietnam bid for non-permanent membership of the United Nations Security Council. Vietnam's support for Pakistan in 2011 for EU duty waiver for its textile products has also been seen as very critical by Pakistani diplomats.

=== Pakistan's counter to Indian influence in Vietnam ===
Pakistan has been seriously following Vietnamese diplomacy and has a sense of wary over the development of strong ties between India and Vietnam, consequently having the potential of deteriorating relations between Pakistan and Vietnam. This is due to the fact that Pakistan is a long-time close ally of China, the latter of which has tense relations with Vietnam. Developments in Vietnam's relations with Pakistan's rival India would prove to be a major problem for Pakistan. To circumvent this, Pakistan's "East Asia Vision Strategy" was projected in order to balance Pakistani-Vietnamese relations.

== Pakistanis in Vietnam ==
Areas with a significant population of Pakistanis in Vietnam include the cities of Hanoi and Ho Chi Minh City.

== Vietnamese in Pakistan ==
Many factors contribute to the limited presence of Vietnamese communities and culture within Pakistan, most notably the latter's close relationship with China. Due to the absence of a strong historical connection and no close relations between the two countries (as well as the geographical distance between them), there continues to be a lack of interaction between the Vietnamese and Pakistani people (not taking into account the diasporas of both communities that are present in countries such as the United States and Canada). Despite this, it is not uncommon for the two communities to cross paths as Pakistan regularly hosts a respectable amount of Vietnamese tourists and small communities of Vietnamese people and cuisine can be found in Karachi.
