= Pakistan–Taiwan relations =

- Taiwan: Pakistan

Diplomatic mission
- Taipei Economic and Cultural Representative Office in the Kingdom of Saudi Arabia: Pakistani Consulate General in Hong Kong

Envoy
- Representative, Teng Sheng-Ping: Abdul Qadir Memon

Pakistan–Taiwan relations mainly involves commerce and trade. The relationship between Pakistan and Taiwan is primarily characterized by economic importance rather than political significance, given Pakistan's close alliance with the People's Republic of China. The Pakistani government adheres to a "One-China" policy.

== History ==
Pakistan and Taiwan have had a weak relationship since 1951. When Pakistan became independent, it maintained a relationship with Taiwan from 1947 to 1951, until China emerged on the global map following the Second Chinese Civil War, Pakistan took the side of the People's Republic of China instead of the Republic Of China (Taiwan).

== Economic ties ==
Pakistan and Taiwan do not maintain any official embassy council, trade or cultural center, but maintain a trade relationship. In 2019, Taiwan expressed interest in relocating their textile industry from Vietnam to Pakistan, owing to cheap labour costs in Pakistan.

== Trade volume ==
The major imports between Pakistan and Taiwan include petroleum products, electrical machinery, plastics, iron, and steel. According to Taiwan External Trade Development Council (TAITRA) data, Pakistan's imports from Taiwan totalled US$626 million in 2019. In the same year, its exports to Taiwan were worth US$100 million.

== Ambassador ties ==
Taiwan established an embassy in Pakistan after 1951, Pakistan reciprocated by establishing its own embassy in Taiwan. However, Pakistan later opened General Council in Hong Kong, whose jurisdiction spreads across Hong Kong, Macau, and Taiwan. Pakistan comes under the jurisdiction of Taiwan's Taipei Economic and Cultural Representative Office in the Kingdom of Saudi Arabia.
