= Pakistan–Zimbabwe relations =

- Pakistan: Zimbabwe

Pakistan is represented in Zimbabwe by its embassy in the capital, Harare.

The two countries have noteworthy cultural and political ties, such as initiating and participating in joint defence pacts. The Pakistani government has pledged to always "stand by Zimbabwe in its challenging times and continue to render assistance in every way possible in an effort to cement the already cordial relations between the two countries."

Since 1983, both the countries have been involved in military and defence co-operation. This agreement was renewed once again in 2007 when Pakistan sent several senior military experts to help strengthen and train President Robert Mugabe's army. The experts were to be stationed in the country for two years and paid by the Zimbabwean government in US dollars.

In 2008, speaking in a function marking the first anniversary of the Pakistan-Zimbabwe Friendship Association, the Pakistani Ambassador to Zimbabwe, Mrs. Rifat Iqbal, had stated that "the formation of the friendship association was a symbol of continuing solidarity between the two countries."

There is a small Pakistani expatriate community living in Zimbabwe, numbering over 400 in 2005 that largely consists of professionals, businesspeople and traders. In addition, a sizeable number of Indo-Zimbabwean migrants who came from the South Asia and settled in Zimbabwe, originally hail from or have family connections in regions that now constitute present-day Pakistan.

President Mohammad Zia-ul-Haq, once addressing a small gathering of Pakistanis in Zimbabwe, is famously known to have said while addressing African stereotypes that his countrymen should not go by the natives' black colour because "They [Zimbabweans] are good at heart!".

== Investment and strategical interests ==
Despite specific economic hardships in Zimbabwe, Pakistani investors have since the past, continued to show interest in exploring investment opportunities in the country. There have recently been joint ventures in the fields of trade development, which have also been identified by Pakistan as an impetus to its aim in "fighting poverty in Zimbabwe."
