= Arab League–Pakistan relations =

- Arab League: Pakistan

Arab League–Pakistan relations refer to foreign relations between Pakistan and the various states of the Arab world which constitute the Arab League.

== Background ==
Pakistan has close ties to the Arab League, particularly Saudi Arabia, the United Arab Emirates, Syria, Jordan, Yemen, Oman, Qatar, Lebanon, Kuwait, and Iraq. These ties were tested in 2005 when a massive earthquake hit Pakistan's Northern Areas; Saudi Arabia and the UAE promptly sent critical aid—medicine and essential supplies—and injected billions of dollars for the reconstruction. Pakistan also has extensive cultural and defense ties with most Arab League members. It also has considerable trade ties, particularly with Saudi Arabia and the UAE; Saudi Arabia is its second-largest trading partner after the United States. In 2006, Russian President Vladimir Putin invited Pakistan to the First Session of the Russia-Islamic World Strategic Vision Group because of its close ties with the Arab world.

Army, Naval, and Air Force cadets of several Arab League countries routinely enroll in training courses in Pakistan's military academies. Pakistan Air Force pilots have flown Egyptian, Jordanian, Syrian, and Saudi fighter jets in two wars against Israel in1967 and 1973, and in peacetime as part of their 'foreign deployments'. Units from the Pakistan Army, Navy, and Air Force routinely serve in Saudi Arabia and the UAE as instructors, maintenance crews, etc. There are strong indications that a company of Elite Pakistani Commandos, the SSG, maintains a permanent unit in Saudi Arabia to safeguard Islam's holiest sites and the Saudi Royal Family. Much of the United Arab Emirates' Air Force and Army consists of Pakistani military personnel.

In 2007, Pakistani president Pervez Musharraf attended the Arab League summit held in Riyadh even though Pakistan had not become an 'Observer Member'. Pakistan is currently finalizing a free trade agreement with the GCC countries, many of which are part of the Arab League; talks on the 'Observer' status are continuing. The country also has a history of ardently supporting several Arab causes, including Palestine.

== See also ==
- Foreign relations of the Arab League
- Pakistan-OIC relations
- Iran–Pakistan relations
- Pakistan–Turkey relations
