= Mexico–Pakistan relations =

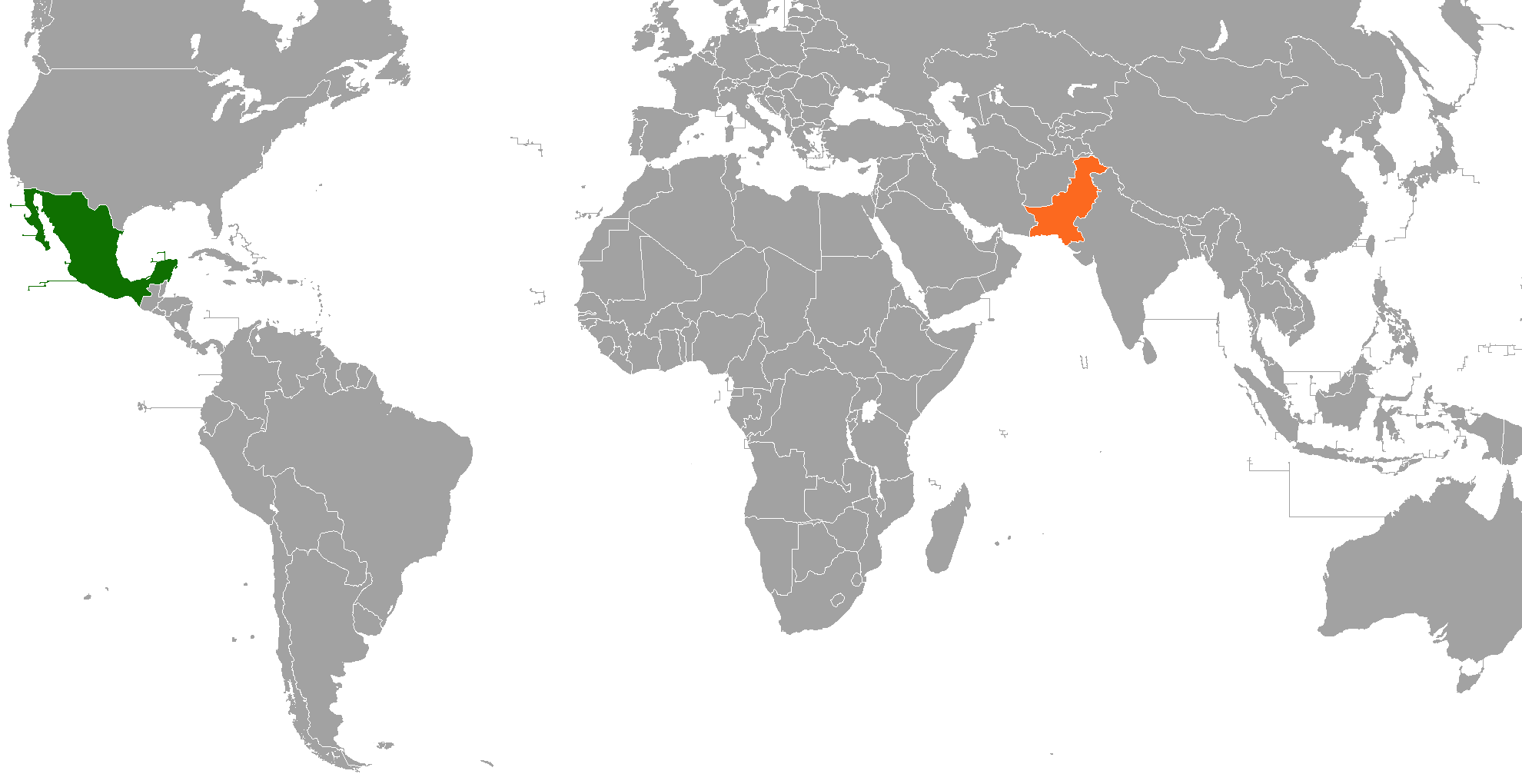

- Mexico: Pakistan

The nations of Mexico and Pakistan established diplomatic relations in 1955. Both nations are members of the United Nations and the World Trade Organization.

== History ==
In August 1947, the Dominion of Pakistan (today the Islamic Republic of Pakistan and modern-day Bangladesh) won independence from the British Empire. On 19 January 1955, Mexico and Pakistan established diplomatic relations. In May 1974, Pakistan opened an embassy in Mexico City. In 2007, Mexico opened an embassy in Islamabad, however, due to budget restraints, the embassy closed in 2009 and in its place, honorary consulates were opened in Karachi and Lahore.

In December 2004, Pakistani President Pervez Musharraf paid an official visit to Mexico and met with President Vicente Fox. During the visit, both leaders discussed supporting a proposal to reform the United Nations.

In April 2007, Mexican Foreign Undersecretary Lourdes Aranda Bezaury paid a visit to Pakistan to attend the second meeting for consultations mechanism on matters of common interest in Islamabad. In March 2015, Pakistani Foreign Vice-Minister Burhanul Islam paid a visit to Mexico and met with members of the Mexican Senate and expressed Pakistan's interest in negotiating a free trade agreement with Mexico.

In 2023, both nations held their 6th meeting for consultations mechanism on matters of common interest held in Islamabad and attended by the Director General for Africa, Central Asia and Middle East for the Mexican Secretariat of Foreign Affairs Jose Tripp Villanueva.

== High-level visits ==
High-level visits from Mexico to Pakistan

- Foreign Undersecretary Lourdes Aranda Bezaury (2007)
- Director General for Africa, Central Asia and Middle East Jose Tripp Villanueva (2023)

High-level visits from Pakistan to Mexico

- President Pervez Musharraf (2004)
- Foreign Vice-Minister Burhanul Islam (2015)
- Minister for Planning, Development and Reforms Ahsan Iqbal (2018)
- Deputy Chairman of the Senate of Pakistan Saleem Mandviwalla (2019)

== Bilateral agreements ==
Both nations have signed a few bilateral agreements such as an agreement on the elimination of visas for diplomatic and official passport holders (2008); Memorandum of Understanding between the Mexican Secretariat of Agriculture and Rural Development and the Pakistani Ministry of National Food Security & Research for rice export to Mexico (2008) and an Agreement on Scientific and Technical Cooperation (2015).

== Trade relations ==
In 2023, bilateral trade of the two nations amounted to US$372.4 million. Mexico's main exports to Pakistan include: cotton, chemical-based products, rolled stainless steel products, refrigerators, data processing machines, and plastic. Pakistan's main exports to Mexico include: textiles and clothing articles, medical instruments, tools, cement, minerals, salt, and pepper.

== Resident diplomatic missions ==
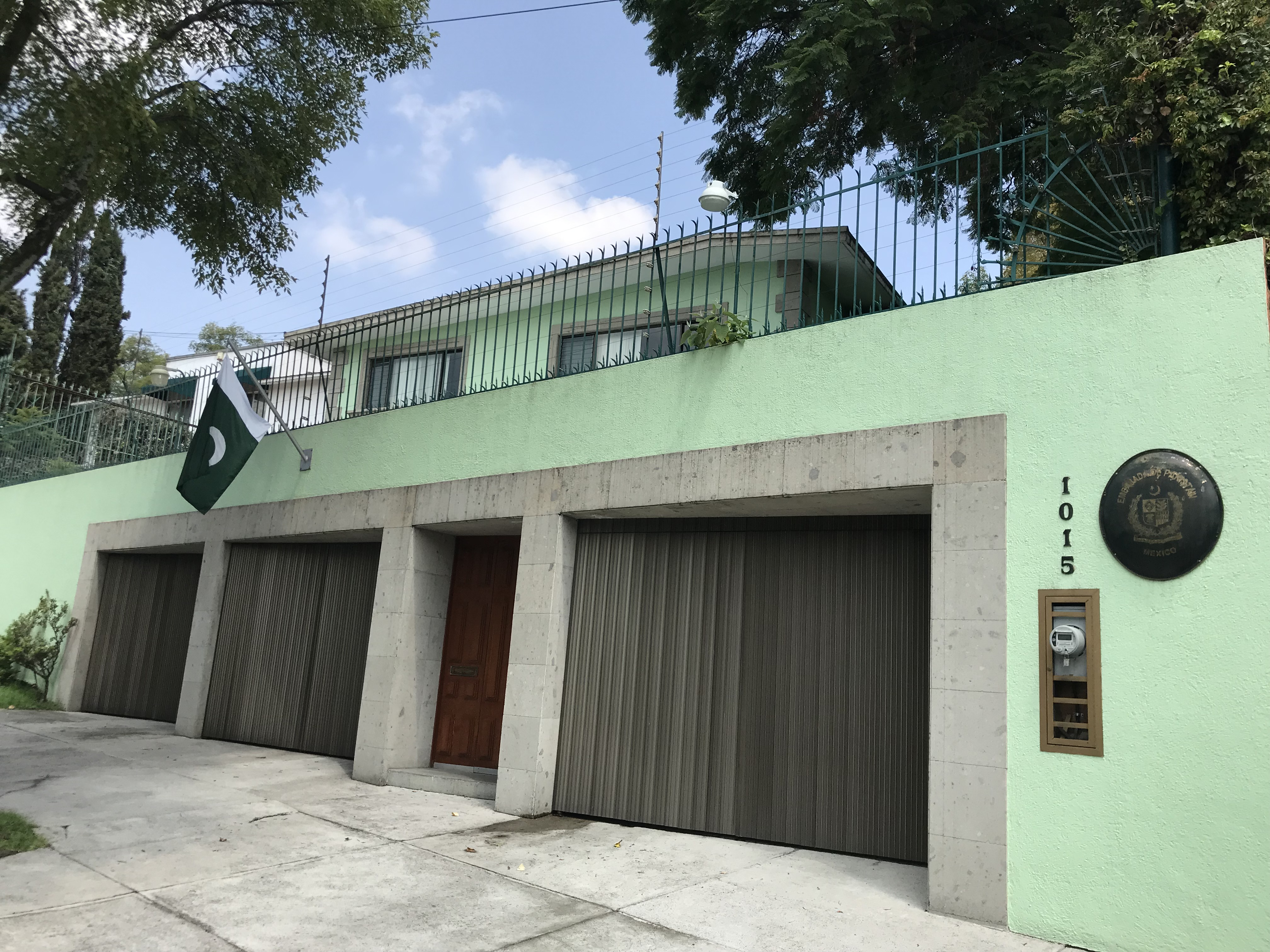
Embassy of Pakistan in Mexico City

- Mexico is accredited to Pakistan from its embassy in Tehran, Iran and maintains honorary consulates in Karachi and Lahore.
- Pakistan has an embassy in Mexico City.

== See also ==
- Overseas Pakistani
