= Pakistan and the Organisation of Islamic Cooperation =

Relations between Pakistan and the OIC

Flag of Pakistan

Pakistan continues to enjoy a privileged status in the Organisation of Islamic Cooperation (OIC, formerly the Organisation of the Islamic Conference). In terms of population, it is the OIC's second largest member. Pakistan is the only Muslim country to have detonated nuclear weapons, has the sixth-largest standing military force in the world and a large labour workforce working in various Muslim countries.

== OIC role in Pakistan-Bangladesh relationship ==
It was under the pretext of the 2nd summit of OIC held in Lahore between 22 and 24 February 1974 that Pakistan recognised the former or ex-Eastern Pakistan as the People's Republic of Bangladesh. Pakistan had initially not invited Bangladesh to attend the summit. However, as members of the OIC group gathered in Lahore, several heads of the state from the Arab world put pressure on Pakistan's then prime minister Zulfiqar Ali Bhutto, to invite Sheikh Mujibur Rehman to attend. A seven-member delegation from OIC in fact visited Dhaka to invite Sheikh Mujib to participate in the summit. As a result of the 2nd OIC summit, Pakistan formally recognised Bangladesh on 22 February 1974, and Sheikh Mujib was flown by a special aircraft from Dhaka to Lahore to attend the summit. Bhutto subsequently visited Dhaka in July 1974. Established relations on 18 January 1976.

Pakistan has raised many important issues at the second summit of OIC. Pakistan has had frayed relations with India and because of its involvement in civil war, East Pakistan seceded from West Pakistan in 1971. The intervention gave rise to the state of Bangladesh.

== Pakistan's solidarity with Palestine ==
Pakistan assisted Jordan in military operations to suppress freedom movement by Palestine Liberation Organisation. However, Pakistan is a critic of occupation of Palestinian territories by Jewish state of Israel. In line with OIC strong stance against the occupation of Palestine by Zionists, Pakistan has continuously adopted a stance against Israel.

== Military cooperation ==
Pakistan enjoys sound and steadfast military defence relations with many members of OIC.

=== Army collaboration ===
Army Service Corps School has trained up to 30 officers from Muslim countries like Bangladesh, Bosnia, Maldives, Palestine, Turkey. Pakistan Army Military College of Signals has trained more than 500 officers from places such as Burma, Bahrain, Bangladesh, Bosnia, Gambia, Ghana, Indonesia, Iraq, Iran, Jordan, Kenya, Libya, Malaysia, Oman, Nepal, Nigeria, Oman, Palestine, Sudan, South Africa, Sri Lanka, Saudi Arabia, Tanzania, Turkmenistan, Uganda, UAE and Zambia, most of these countries are member of OIC.

=== Naval collaboration ===
More than 1900 officers from Muslim countries such as Saudi Arabia, UAE, Bahrain, Qatar, Palestine, Turkmenistan, Lebanon, Iran, Ghana, Jordan, Kuwait, Libya and Oman have been trained in Pakistan Naval Academy. Pakistan SSGN has also trained officers from countries like Saudi Arabia, Egypt, Qatar and Iran.

=== Military technology collaboration ===
Pakistan is thought to have developed its atomic bomb programme with millions of dollars of contributory aid from (mostly) Saudi Arabia and Libyan oil wealth.

== OIC on the issue of Kashmir ==
Pakistan has always used OIC as a platform to gather support on the Kashmir conflict against the Republic of India. In 1969 King Hassan of Morocco invited the Government of India for the 1969 Summit in Rabat. But after Pakistan then ruler Gen Yahya Khan threatened to walk out, King Hassan requested the Indian delegates not to attend the meeting.

During the OIC 1994 Conference in Tehran, Pakistan succeeded in persuading the member countries to create the "OIC Contact Group on Kashmir". The Foreign Minister of Pakistan would discuss the possibility of cutting ties with any state that recognized Jammu and Kashmir as "Integral part of India" by safeguarding our national security and geo-strategic interests including Kashmir; some countries are not recognized by Pakistan because of their move towards against the self-determination of Kashmiris as a form of aggression. These countries are the State of Israel, Armenia, Costa Rica, Liberia and Zambia.

A suicide bombing on Indian Forces on 14 February 2019, followed by Indian claim Air Strike subsequently led to a military stand off between India and Pakistan.

India with its expanding diplomatic, economic and military clout, has been strengthening its relations with middle east. Hence, amid the tensions, Indian Foreign Minister Sushma Swaraj was invited as "Guest of Honour" by UAE to represent India as an observer state.

Pakistan rejected this development and demanded the expulsion of India from the summit citing Kashmir issue and Indian violation of airspace of Pakistan, a founding member of OIC. OIC called emergency meeting of Kashmir contact group on Pakistan's request, the meeting was on February 26, 2019. Although, OIC condemned Indian violation of Pakistani airspace by India, UAE refused to revert invitation to India.

Hence, for the first time in five decades, the United Arab Emirates invited foreign minister of India Sushma Swaraj to attend the inaugural plenary 46th meeting of OIC foreign ministers held in Abu Dhabi on 1 and 2 March. Pakistan boycotted the meet objecting to the invitation to India. Swaraj addressed the meet raising concern for spreading terrorism.

== See also ==
- Islamic Summit Minar
