= Androulla Kaminara =

Ambassador of the European Union

H.E. Androulla Kaminara
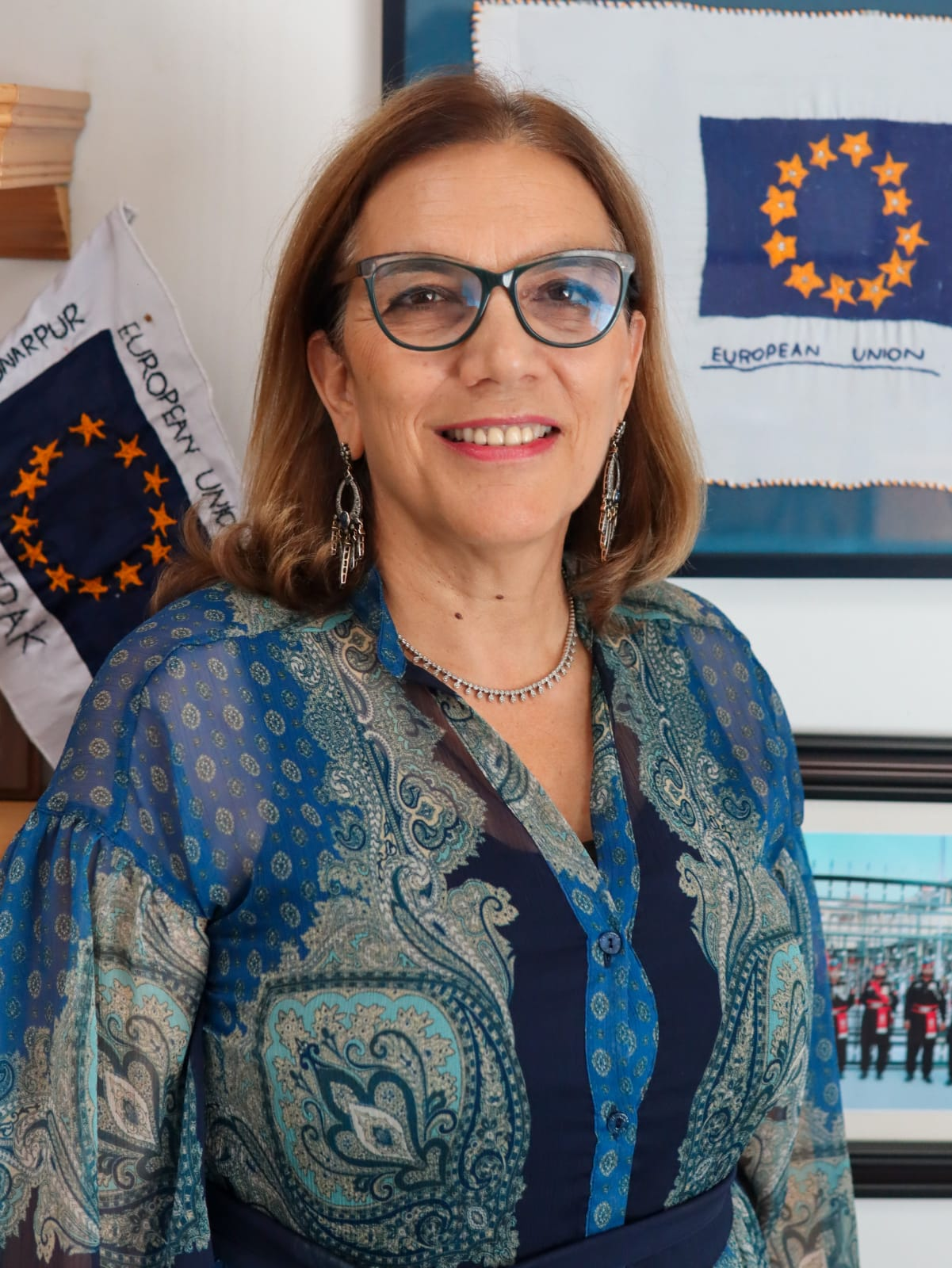

Ambassador of the European Union to Pakistan
- In office 17 September 2019 – May 2022
- Preceded by: Jean François Cautain (2015-2019)

Director of Humanitarian Aid Operations for Africa, Asia, Latin America, Caribbean and Pacific | DG ECHO
- In office July 2016 – August 2019

Principal Advisor and Head of Task Force on Knowledge, Performance and Results | DG DEVCO
- In office July 2014 – June 2016

Personal details
- Born: 29 April 1957 (age 69) Republic of Cyprus
- Education: Masters International Politics from Université libre de Bruxelles & MSc Diploma Management Science from Imperial College, University of London
- Alma mater: University of London & Université libre de Bruxelles
- Awards: International Peace Award Global Ambassadors Award

Androulla Kaminara (born 29 April 1957) is a former European civil servant who from September 2019 to May 2022 served as the Ambassador and Head of Delegation of the European Union to the Islamic Republic of Pakistan. As such, she was the first female ambassador of the European Union to Pakistan. Before her appointment to the European External Action Service, she joined the European Commission in 1991, where she has served in various Directorates General, including those dealing with technology, communications, development cooperation, international relations, and humanitarian aid.

Kaminara has held a number of high-level positions at the European Commission including five years as Director for Africa, Asia, Latin America, Caribbean and Pacific in the Directorate-General for European Civil Protection and Humanitarian Aid Operations (ECHO), and Principal Adviser and Head of the Task Force "Knowledge, Performance and Results" in the Directorate-General for International Cooperation and Development from 2014 to 2016. She has served as a member of Cabinet in the offices of two European Commissioners with portfolios in development cooperation and energy and small and medium-sized enterprises policy respectively. She served for two years as EU fellow/visiting academic at St. Antony's College, Oxford University, and as research associate of King's College London, specializing in EU policies and in geopolitics of energy. Before joining the European Commission, Kaminara was a special adviser to two cabinet ministers in Greece and managing director of a private consultancy firm.

== Early and personal life ==
Androulla Kaminara was born in Cyprus in 1957. Cypriot by birth, Kaminara also holds British and Greek citizenship. She is married. She takes a keen interest in arts and culture. Her hobbies include swimming and scuba diving and holds a captain's license for sailing. She can speak Greek, English, French, Spanish and Turkish.

== Education ==
Androulla Kaminara holds a Bachelor of Science (Hons.) in geology from King's College and in physics from University of London, a Master of Science degree in management science from Imperial College, University of London, as well as a Maîtrise in international relations from the Université libre de Bruxelles (ULB) in Brussels.

== European Commission ==
- Staff member - European Commission Directorate General Information and Communication Technologies (January 1991 - December)
- EU Fellow to the University of Pittsburgh, Pennsylvania, United States (September 1999 - December 1999)
- Member of Cabinet - Greek Commissioner Responsible for Transport, Energy and SME issues Christos Papoutsis (January 2000 - July 2000)
- Member of Cabinet - Danish Commissioner Responsible for Development Cooperation Poul Nielson (August 2000 - July 2003)
- Head of Unit - European Commission Directorate General - EuropeAid - Geographic Coordination for 44 West and Central African and Caribbean Countries (July 2003 - July 2006)
- Director for Quality of Operations of the European Commission's Directorate-General for International Partnerships|Directorate General - EuropeAid (July 2006 - April 2008)
- Head of the European Commission Representation in Cyprus (April 2008 - March 2012)
- European Commission Special Advisor, Directorate General for Communications (March 2012 - September 2012)
- Academic Visitor to St. Antony's College & European Union Fellow to St. Antony's College, Oxford University (October 2012 - July 2013 and October 2013 - July 2014)
- Principal Advisor and Head of Task Force on Knowledge, Performance and Results | Directorate General for International Cooperation and Development (DG DEVCO) (July 2014 - June 2016)
- Director of Humanitarian Aid Operations for Africa, Asia, Latin America, Caribbean and Pacific | Directorate General for European Civil Protection and Humanitarian Aid Operations (DG ECHO) (July 2016 - August 2019)

== EEAS - European External Action Service ==
Androulla Kaminara assumed the office as Ambassador and Head of the Delegation of the European Union to Pakistan on September 17, 2019. She presented her credentials to President of Pakistan Dr. Arif Alvi during a ceremony at the Aiwan-i-Sadr on November 7, 2019.

During her tenure as an Ambassador, Kaminara has been working for the promotion of EU-Pakistan Business & Trade. She launched an EU – Pakistan Business Forum, a series of one-day conferences to highlight both the potential of Pakistani SME's and the opportunities of the European Single Market as export destination. The EU-Pakistan Business Forum raised awareness about the European Single Market among Pakistani SMEs and to discuss the experiences and challenges SMEs are facing to be part of global supply chains and to export to Europe. During the three editions in Islamabad, Lahore and Karachi the Business Forum focused on a range of sectors, such as IT, gems and jewelry, surgical goods, auto-parts among others.

During her tenure as Ambassador, Kaminara also highlighted the importance of Generalized Scheme of Preferences (GSP+). She actively engaged with Pakistani lawmakers, the business community as well as journalists and the wider public to underline GSP+ being a central pillar of the EU-Pakistan relations. Highlighting the benefits Pakistan has drawn from the GSP+ system since Pakistan obtained the trade preference in 2014, she underlined the untapped potential for Pakistan.

In her efforts to promote Interfaith Harmony, Kaminara initiated, a series of interfaith roundtables, in collaboration with Maulana Abdul Khadir Azad, Grand Imam of Badshahi Mosque, with the first one taking place in Islamabad in December 2020 and last one in July 2021. This initiative brought together representatives and experts with very different backgrounds: religious leaders and human rights activists and they all shared the objective to advance interfaith harmony and the respect of the freedom of religion and belief.

Under her ambassadorship, the EU cooperated closely with the Economic Affairs Division on donor coordination, streamlining of programme approval procedures and other topics relevant to the cooperation of the Government of Pakistan with Development Partners. The EU signed five financing agreements in 2020–2021, worth €141 million, with the Government of Pakistan, related to public finance management, rule of law, education, water management and poverty reduction, ensuring funds commitments in a timely manner. Consultations were held at federal and provincial levels in 2020 and 2021 on the future multi-annual indicative programme for bilateral EU-Pakistan cooperation from 2021 to 2027, paving the way for funding of the coming seven years.

Kaminara was the chair of the Pakistan chapter of the Core Group - Support Platform for the Solutions Strategy for Afghan Refugees (SSAR) and is spearheading the multilateral Core Group platform on policy and operational dialogue to foster inclusive policies and resilience building measures for Afghan Refugees in Pakistan.

== Awards and recognition ==
=== International Peace Award ===
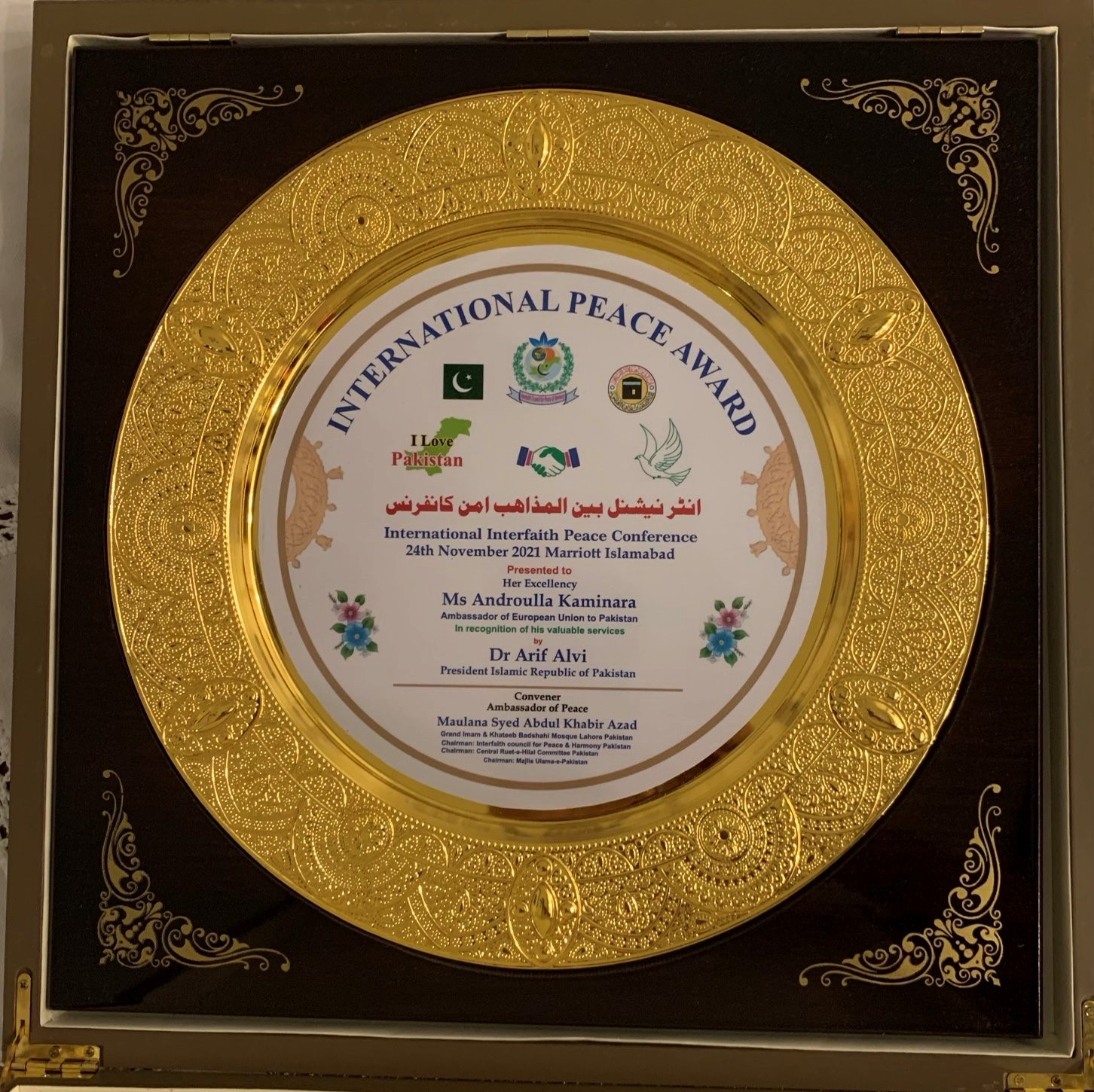
International Peace Award

On 24 November 2021, Androulla Kaminara was awarded the International Peace Award in recognition of her services for the cause of interfaith harmony during the International Interfaith Peace Conference in Islamabad organized by the Interfaith Council for Peace and Harmony and Majlis Ulema-e-Pakistan with financial support by the EU Delegation. The award was presented by President of Pakistan Dr. Arif Alvi, co-convener of the conference.

=== Global Ambassadors Award ===
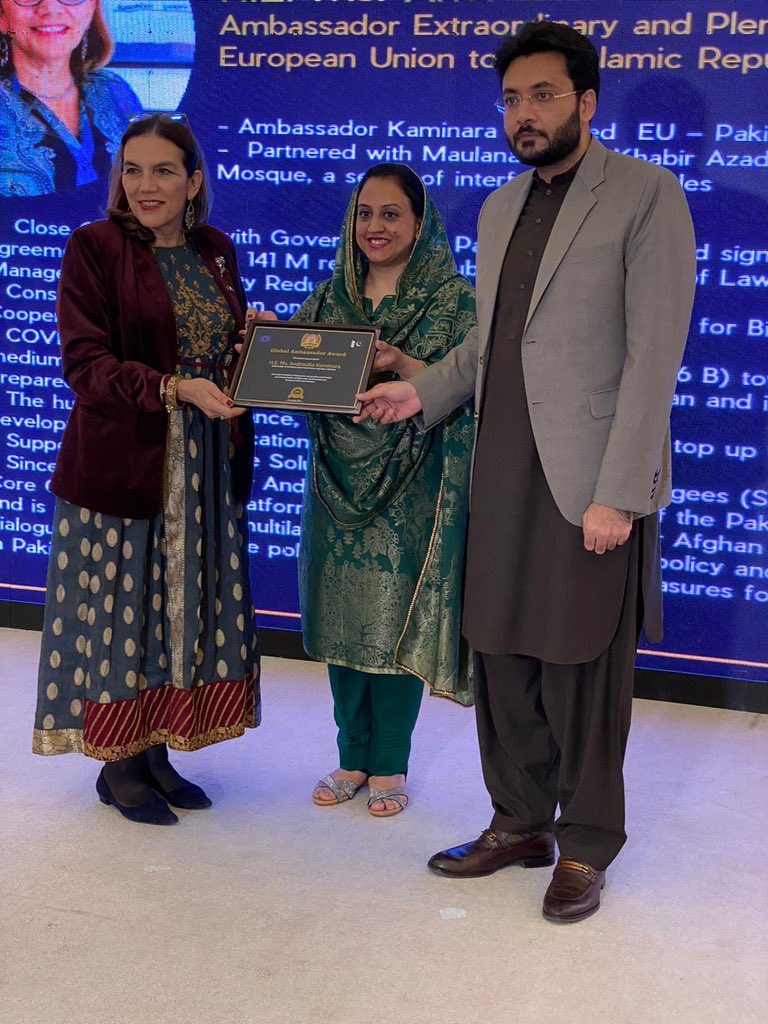
Minister of State for Information and Broadcasting Farrukh Habib presenting award to Androulla Kaminara in the fourth Global Ambassadors Award Ceremony 2021

On 25 November 2021, Androulla Kaminara received an award acknowledging the services of Foreign Diplomats in Pakistan. The award was presented by the Minister of State for Information and Broadcasting Farrukh Habib in the fourth Global Ambassadors Award Ceremony 2021 organized by The Diplomatic Insight Group. Androulla Kaminara was recognized for her work to promote the political, economic, cultural, educational, people-to-people contacts, trade, and development works in Pakistan. As well as her close coordination with Government of Pakistan to further strengthen the EU-Pakistan Relations. During the ceremony, Global Ambassadors Awards were also given to the Ambassadors of the Republic of Iraq, of the Kingdom of Morocco, of Romania, of the Federal Republic of Somalia, of the Kingdom of Spain, and of the Republic of Yemen, as well as the WHO Country Representative in Pakistan, the Consul General of Moldova, the Agricultural Commissioner of the Embassy of the People’s Republic of China, and the Third Secretary Embassy of Kazakhstan to Pakistan.

== Publications ==
Energy and security in the East Mediterranean: How energy will play an increasingly important role in the security of the East Mediterranean (March 2014) Opinion Piece by Androulla Kaminara in South East European Studies at Oxford (SEESOX)

Now there is a window of opportunity for decisions leading to the optimization of the benefits from East Mediterranean natural gas discoveries (March 2014) Article by Androulla Kaminara

The gender dimensions of energy policy" (July 2015) Opinion Piece by Androulla Kaminara in South East European Studies at Oxford (SEESOX)

== Opinion editorials (2019-2022) ==
- Time for real honour (2019-12-01) in Daily Times by Androulla Kaminara/Dr. Barrister Farogh Naseem on International Day for the Elimination of Violence Against Women - November 25
- Why women in sports matter (2020-03-08) in The News International by Androulla Kaminara & Hajra Khan on International Women's Day - March 8
- Pak-EU ties: fostering prosperity every day (2020-03-17) in The Express Tribune by Androulla Kaminara
- Europe Day (2020-05-09) in The News International by Ambassadors of EU and Member States on Europe Day - May 9
- Transgender rights during times of Covid-19 (2020-05-17) in The Express Tribune by Ambassadors of EU and Member States on International Day against Homophobia, Transphobia and Biphobia (IDAHOT) - May 17
- Against child labour – making a promise to Zohra (2020-06-12) in The Nation by Androulla Kaminara on World Day against Child Labour - June 12
- Further strengthening electoral processes (2020-09-15) in The Nation by Ambassadors of EU and Member States on International Day of Democracy - September 15
- Right to legal representation (2020-10-10) in The News International by Androulla Kaminara on World Day against Death Penalty - October 10
- Common grounds for religious and social harmony and its contemporary significance (2021-02-07) in The News International by Androulla Kaminara & Dr. Qibla Ayaz on UN Interfaith Harmony Week - first Week of Feb
- Brighter future (2021-03-11) in DAWN by Androulla Kaminara & Pamela Coke-Hamilton on GRASP
- The game changers (2021-06-16) in DAWN by Androulla Kaminara & Sharmeela Rassool
- Democracy vital for prosperity and sustainable development (2021-09-15) in The Express Tribune by Androulla Kaminara on International Day of Democracy - September 15
- COP26 as the turning point: From climate negotiations to solutions (2021-10-16) in The Nation by Androulla Kaminara on Climate Action Weeks 27 Nov-17 Oct
