= Dutch Pakistani =

Dutch Pakistani or Pakistani Dutch may refer to:

- Netherlands–Pakistan relations (cf. "a Dutch–Pakistani treaty")
- Pakistanis in the Netherlands (by analogy to "Pakistani American", though this is not a widely accepted usage)
- Dutch people in Pakistan (by analogy to "British Pakistani", though this is not a widely accepted usage)
- Multiracial people of Dutch and Pakistani descent
