= European Americans =

Americans of European ancestry

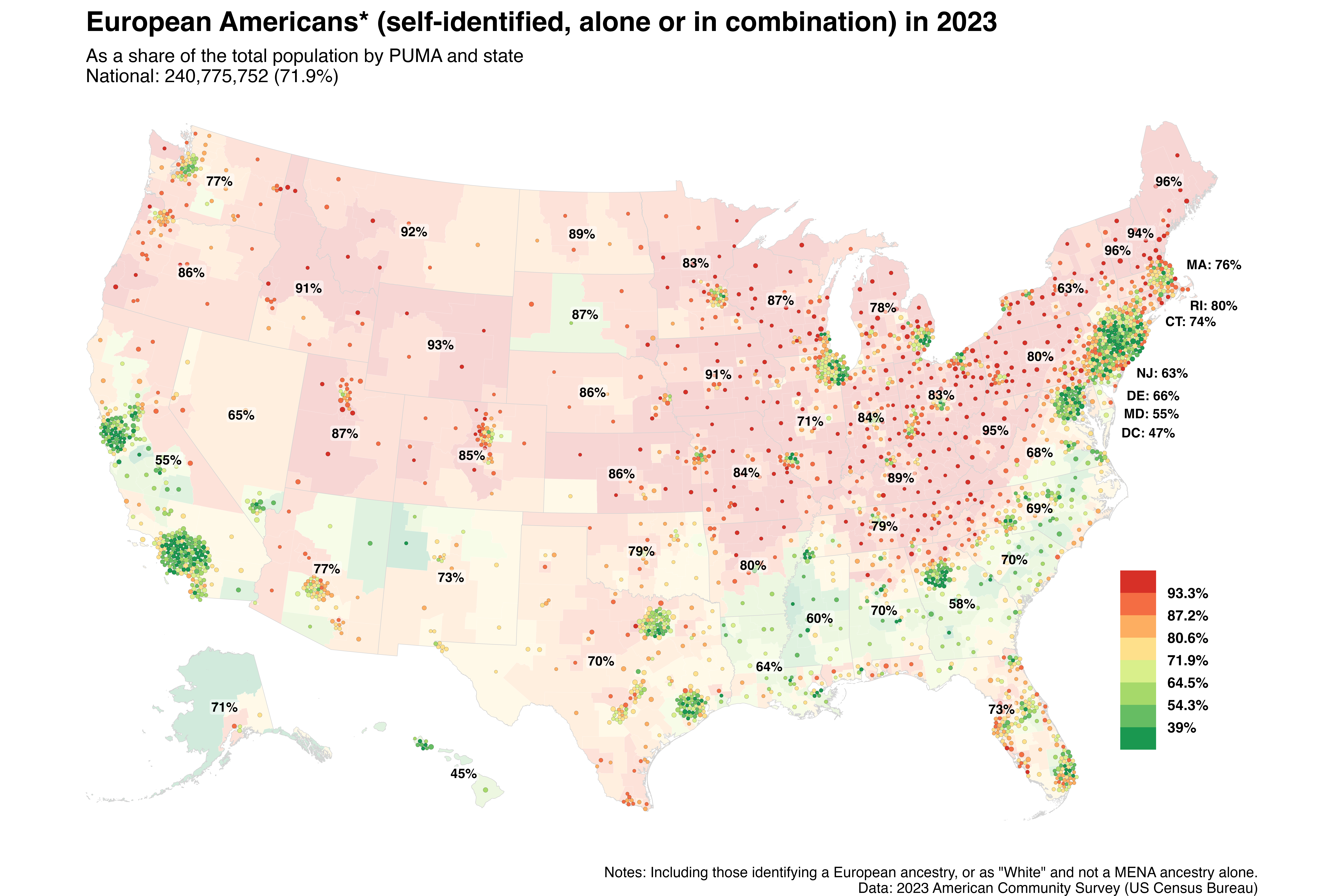
- European Americans by PUMA and state in 2023

Total population
- 120,114,876 (2020); Detailed European responses only^{(Note: The figure only includes those who gave a detailed write-in origins response)} 58.8% of the White alone population 204.3M white (one race); 235.4M White alone or in combination 96.5 million (Note: This group includes people who did not report a more detailed write-in response) (white population who did not report a more detailed write-in response)

Regions with significant populations
- Continental United States smaller populations in Hawaii and the territories

Languages
- Predominantly English, but also other languages of Europe

Religion
- Predominantly Christianity (Mainly Protestantism, Roman Catholicism, and Eastern Orthodoxy); Minority religions: Judaism, Mormonism, Islam, Neo-Paganism, Irreligion, Atheism

European Americans are Americans of European ancestry. This term includes both people who descend from the first European settlers in the area of the present-day United States and people who descend from more recent European arrivals. Since the 17th century, European Americans have been the largest panethnic group in what is now the United States. According to the 2020 United States census, 58.8% of the White alone population and 56.1% of the White alone or in combination gave a detailed European write-in response.

The Spaniards were the first Europeans to establish a continuous presence in what is now the contiguous United States, although arriving in small numbers, with Martín de Argüelles (b. 1566) in St. Augustine, then a part of Spanish Florida, and the Russians were the first Europeans to settle in Alaska, establishing Russian America. The first British child born in the Americas was Virginia Dare, born August 18, 1587. She was born in Roanoke Colony, located in present-day North Carolina, which was the first attempt, made during the reign of Queen Elizabeth I, to establish a permanent English settlement in North America.

In the 2020 United States census, British Americans (46.6 million), German Americans (45 million), Irish Americans (38.6 million), Italian Americans (16.8 million) and Polish Americans (8.6 million) were the five largest self-reported European ancestry groups in the United States.

The 2020 census was the first census to allow data collection on subtypes of Europeans. During previous surveys, the number of people with British ancestry was considered to be significantly under-counted, as many people in that demographic tended to identify themselves simply as Americans (20,151,829 or 7.2%). A 2015 genetic study of 148,789 European Americans concluded that British ancestry was the most common European ancestry among white Americans, with this component ranging between 20% and 55% of the total population in all 50 states, showing its highest levels in the same states where "American" ancestry predominated on the census. The same applies to the number Americans of Spanish ancestry, as most people in that demographic tend to identify themselves as Hispanic and Latino Americans (65,140,276 or 19.4%), especially since the vast majority of this group and their ancestors came to the U.S. from Latin American countries rather than immigrating directly from Spain. Studies show that European genetic ancestry, mainly from Spain, is the largest component in Hispanic Americans, with a mean of 65.1% European genetic ancestry according to one study from 2014. (Note: A different study published in 2019 reported a median Native American genetic ancestry of only 38% among Hispanics, but it did not specify the proportion of European ancestry.)

An increasing number of people ignore the ancestry or origins question or chose no specific ancestral group such as "American or United States". In the 2000 census this represented over 56.1 million or 19.9% of the United States population, an increase from 26.2 million (10.5%) in 1990 and 38.2 million (16.9%) in 1980 and are specified as "unclassified" and "not reported". In the 2020 U.S. census, 96.58 million people did not report any detailed white ethnic origins and are "Not specified".

== Terminology ==
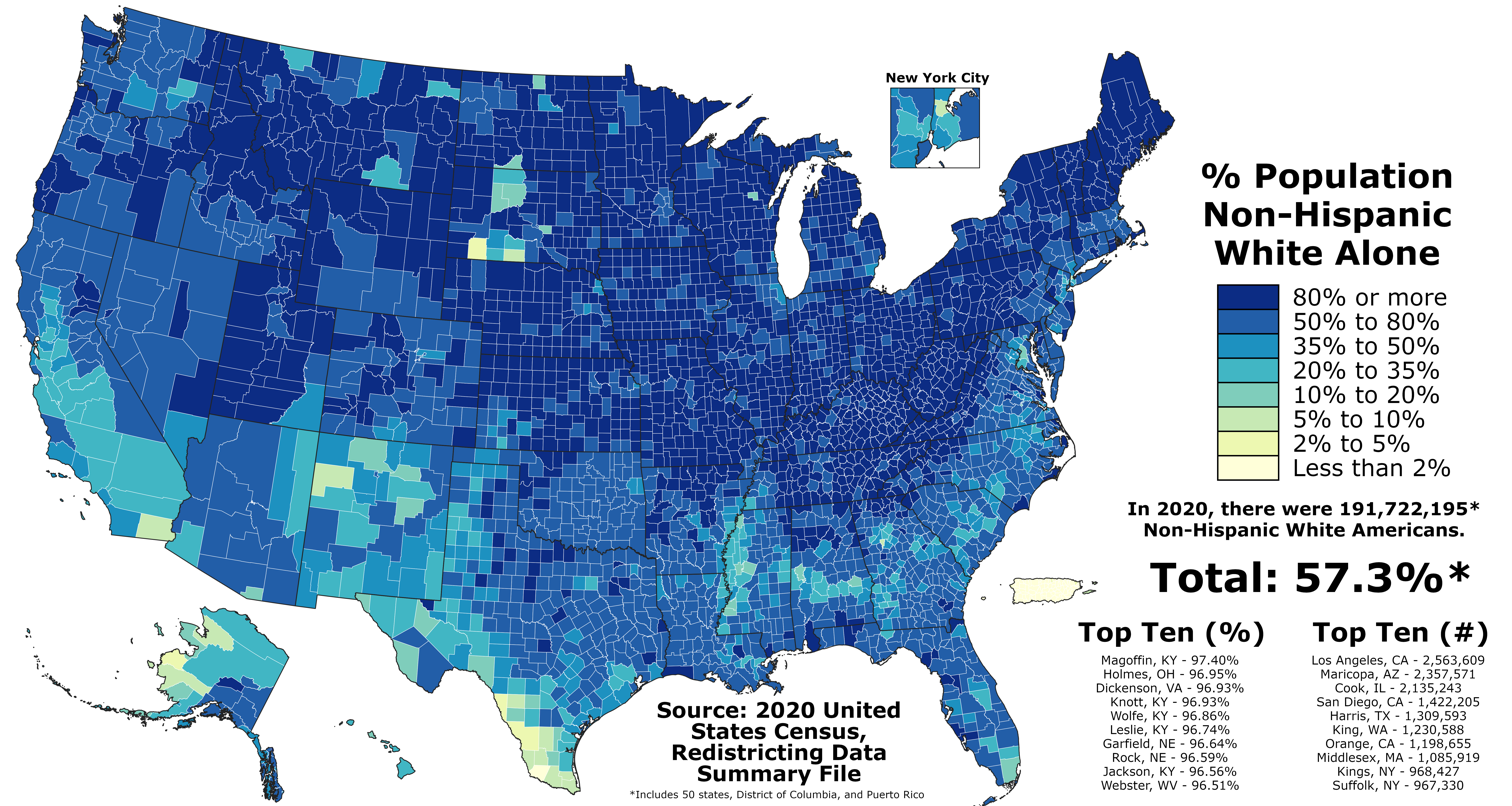
Proportion of White Americans in each county of the fifty states, the District of Columbia, and Puerto Rico as of the 2020 United States census

European Americans 1800–2010
Year	Population	% of the U.S.
1800	4,306,446	81.1
1850	19,553,068	84.3
1900	66,809,196	87.9
1950	134,942,028	89.5
2000	211,460,626	75.1
2010	223,553,265	72.4

=== Use ===
In 1995, as part of a review of the Office of Management and Budget's Statistical Policy Directive No. 15 (Race and Ethnic Standards for Federal Statistics and Administrative Reporting), a survey was conducted of census recipients to determine their preferred terminology for the racial/ethnic groups defined in the Directive. For the White group, European American came a distant third, preferred by only 2.35% of panel interviewees, as opposed to White, which was preferred by 61.66%.

The term is sometimes used interchangeably with Caucasian American, White American, and Anglo-American in the United States.

=== Origin ===
In contexts such as medical research, terms such as "white" and "European" have been criticized for vagueness and blurring important distinctions between different groups that happen to fit within the label. Margo Adair suggests that viewing Americans of European descent as a single group contributes to the "wonder-breading" of the United States, eradicating the cultural heritage of individual European ethnicities.

=== Subgroups ===
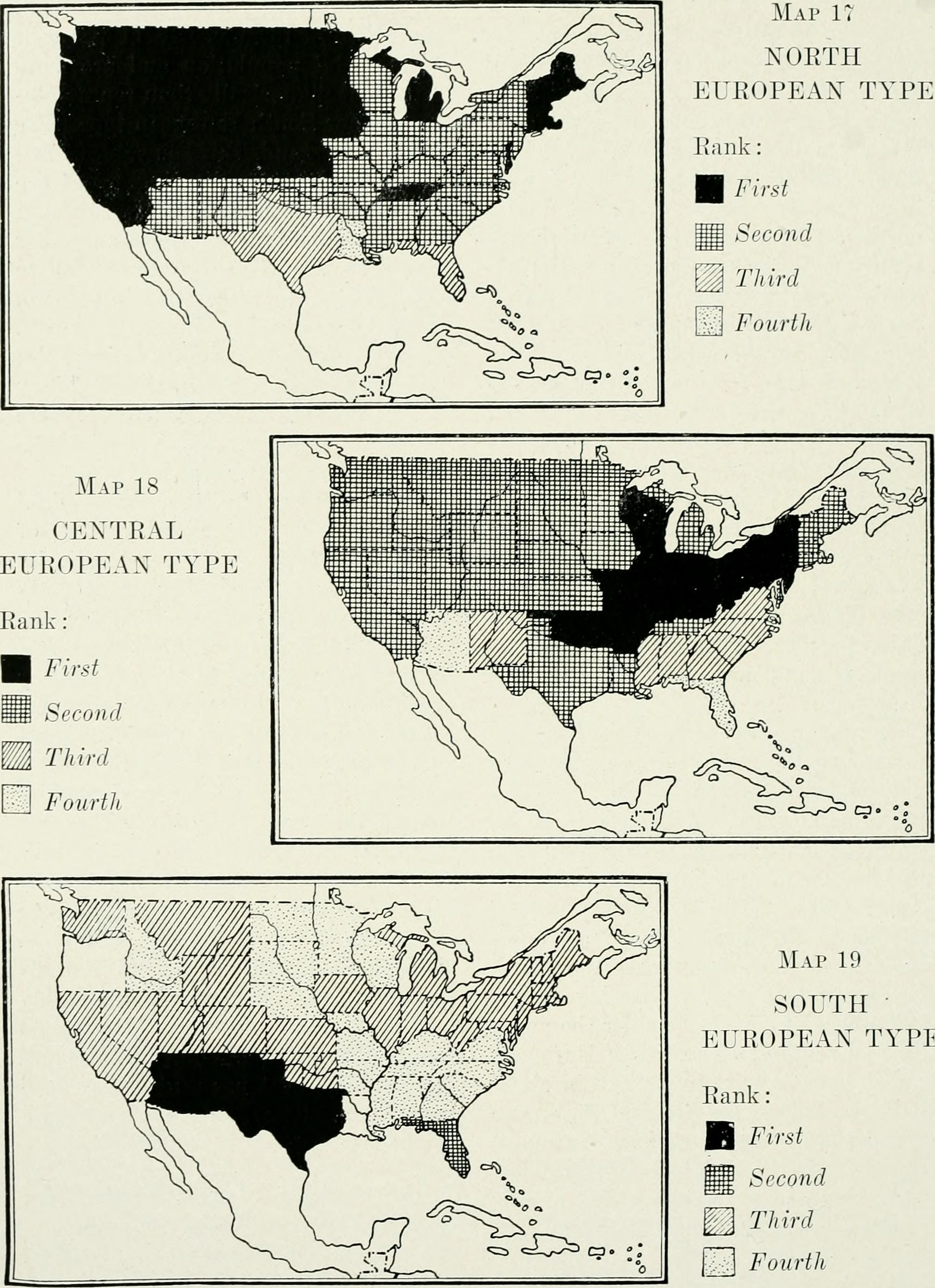
Racial types of European Americans as published in "The American Museum Journal" between 1900 and 1918.

There are several subgroupings of European Americans. While these categories may be approximately defined, often due to the imprecise or cultural regionalization of Europe, the subgroups are nevertheless used widely in cultural or ethnic identification. This is particularly the case in diasporic populations, as with European people in the United States generally. In alphabetical order, some of the subgroups are:

- Northwestern European Americans, including Austrian Americans, Belgian Americans, British Americans (Cornish Americans, English Americans, Manx Americans, Scotch-Irish Americans, Scottish Americans, Welsh Americans), Dutch Americans, French Americans (Breton Americans), German Americans, Irish Americans, Luxembourger Americans, Nordic and Scandinavian Americans (Danish Americans, Finnish Americans, Icelandic Americans, Norwegian Americans, Swedish Americans), and Swiss Americans, or "Old Immigrants" (the first waves of which arrived pre-1881)
- Eastern European Americans, including Belarusian Americans, Czech Americans, Estonian Americans, Hungarian Americans, Latvian Americans, Lithuanian Americans, Polish Americans, Russian Americans, Slovak Americans, and Ukrainian Americans, or "New Immigrants" (the first large waves of which arrived 1881–1965)
- Southern European Americans, including Albanian Americans, Bosnian Americans, Bulgarian Americans, Croatian Americans, Cypriot Americans, Greek Americans, Italian Americans, Maltese Americans, Macedonian Americans, Moldovan Americans, Montenegrin Americans, Portuguese Americans, Romanian Americans, Serbian Americans, Slovenian Americans, and Spanish Americans (Basque Americans, Catalan Americans, Galician Americans), also "New Immigrants" or "New Immigrants"(the first large waves of which arrived 1881–1965)

== History ==
Historical immigration estimates
Country	Before 1790	Ancestry (1790)
England*	230,000	1,900,000
France	150,000	500,000
Ulster Scotch-Irish*	135,000	320,000
Germany (Note: Germany in this time period consisted of a large number of separate countries, the largest of which was Prussia.)	103,000	280,000
Scotland*	48,500	160,000
Ireland	8,000	200,000
Netherlands	6,000	100,000
Wales*	4,000	120,000
Sweden and Other (Note: The Other category probably contains mostly English ancestry settlers. However, the loss of several states' census records makes closer estimates difficult. The summaries of the 1790 and 1800 censuses from all states surveyed.)	500	20,000
*Totals, British	417,500	2,500,000+
United States (Note: Total represents total immigration over the approximately 130-year span of colonial existence of the U.S. colonies as found in the 1790 census. At the time of the American Revolution, the foreign-born population was estimated to be from 300,000 to 400,000.)	950,000	3,929,214

Before the arrival of Europeans, Native Americans predominantly inhabited the United States. The earliest Europeans to colonize North America were the small number of Spaniards. The first Spanish colonization was in 1565 at St. Augustine, Florida. One of the most significant Spanish explorers was Hernando De Soto, a conquistador who accompanied Francisco Pizzaro during his conquest of the Inca Empire.

Leaving Havana, Cuba, in 1539, De Soto's expedition landed in Florida. It explored the southeastern area of the United States. They reached as far as the Mississippi River in search of riches and fortune. Another Spaniard who explored the United States, Francisco Vázquez de Coronado, set out from New Spain in 1540 in search of the mythical Seven Cities of Gold. Coronado's expedition traveled to Kansas and the Grand Canyon but failed to discover gold or treasure. However, Coronado left a gift of horses to the Plains Indians. Italian explorer Giovanni da Verrazano and Frenchman Jacques Cartier are other Europeans who explored the United States. The Spaniards viewed the French as threatening their trade route along the Gulf Stream.

Since 1607, some 57 million immigrants from other lands have come to the United States. Approximately 10 million passed through on their way to some other place or returned to their homelands, leaving a net gain of 47 million people.

During the 1600s and 1700s, Europeans arrived in North America in search of religious freedom, economic prospects, and political independence.

=== Shifts in European migration ===
Before 1881, the vast majority of immigrants, almost 86% of the total, arrived from Northwestern Europe, principally Great Britain, Ireland, Germany, and Scandinavia, known as "Old Immigration". Between 1881 and 1893, the pattern shifted in the sources of U.S. "New Immigration." Between 1894 and 1914, immigrants from Central, Eastern, and Southern Europe accounted for 69% of the total. Prior to 1960, the overwhelming majority came from Europe or of European descent from Canada. Immigration from Europe as a proportion of new arrivals has declined since the mid-20th century, with 75.0% of the total foreign-born population born in Europe compared to 12.1% recorded in the 2010 census.

=== Immigration since 1820 ===
European immigration to the U.S. 1820–1970
Years	Arrivals	Years	Arrivals	Years	Arrivals
1820–1830	98,816	1901–1910	8,136,016	1981–1990	
1831–1840	495,688	1911–1920	4,376,564	1991–2000	
1841–1850	1,597,502	1921–1930	2,477,853	2001-2010	
1851–1860	2,452,657	1931–1940	348,289	2011-2020	
1861–1870	2,064,407	1941–1950	621,704		
1871–1880	2,261,904	1951–1960	1,328,293		
1881–1890	4,731,607	1961–1970	1,129,670		
1891–1900	3,558,793	1971–1980			
			Arrivals	Total	35,679,763

Country of origin 1820–1978
Country	Arrivals	% of total	Country	Arrivals	% of total
Germany^{1}	6,978,000	14.3%	Norway	856,000	1.8%
Italy	5,294,000	10.9%	France	4,351,000	9.5%
Great Britain	4,298,000	9.4%	Greece	655,000	1.3%
Ireland	4,723,000	9.7%	Portugal	446,000	0.9%
Austria-Hungary^{1,} ^{2}	4,315,000	8.9%	Denmark	364,000	0.7%
Russia^{1,} ^{2}	3,374,000	6.9%	Netherlands	359,000	0.7%
Sweden	1,272,000	2.6%	Finland	33,000	0.1%
				Total	34,318,000

==== Population born in Europe ====
The figures below show that of the total population of the specified birthplace in the United States, 11.1% were born overseas.

Population / Proportion born in Europe in 1850–2020
Year	Population	% of foreign-born
1850	2,031,867	92.2%
1860	3,807,062	92.1%
1870	4,941,049	88.8%
1880	5,751,823	86.2%
1890	8,030,347	86.9%
1900	8,881,548	86.0%
1910	11,810,115	87.4%
1920	11,916,048	85.7%
1930	11,784,010	83.0%
1960	7,256,311	75.0%
1970	5,740,891	61.7%
1980	5,149,572	39.0%
1990	4,350,403	22.9%
2000	4,915,557	15.8%
2010	4,817,437	12.1%
2020	-	-

Birthplace	Population in 2010	Percent in 2010	Population in 2016	Percent in 2016
Totals, European-born	4,817,437	12.0%	4,785,267	10.9%
Northern Europe	923,564	2.3%	950,872	2.2%
United Kingdom	669,794	1.7%	696,896	1.6%
Ireland	124,457	0.3%	125,840	0.3%
Other Northern Europe	129,313	0.3%	128,136	0.3%
Western Europe	961,791	2.4%	939,383	2.1%
Germany	604,616	1.5%	563,985	1.3%
France	402,373	0.9%	575,383	1.2%
Other Western Europe	209,216	0.5%	200,148	0.4%
Southern Europe	779,294	2.0%	760,352	1.7%
Italy	364,972	0.9%	335,763	0.8%
Portugal	189,333	0.5%	176,638	0.4%
Other Southern Europe	224,989	0.6%	247,951	0.5%
Eastern Europe	2,143,055	5.4%	2,122,951	4.9%
Poland	475,503	1.2%	424,928	1.0%
Russia	383,166	1.0%	397,236	0.9%
Other Eastern Europe	1,284,286	3.2%	1,300,787	3.0%
Other Europe (no country specified)	9,733	0.0%	11,709	0.0%
Source: 2010 and 2016

== Demographics ==
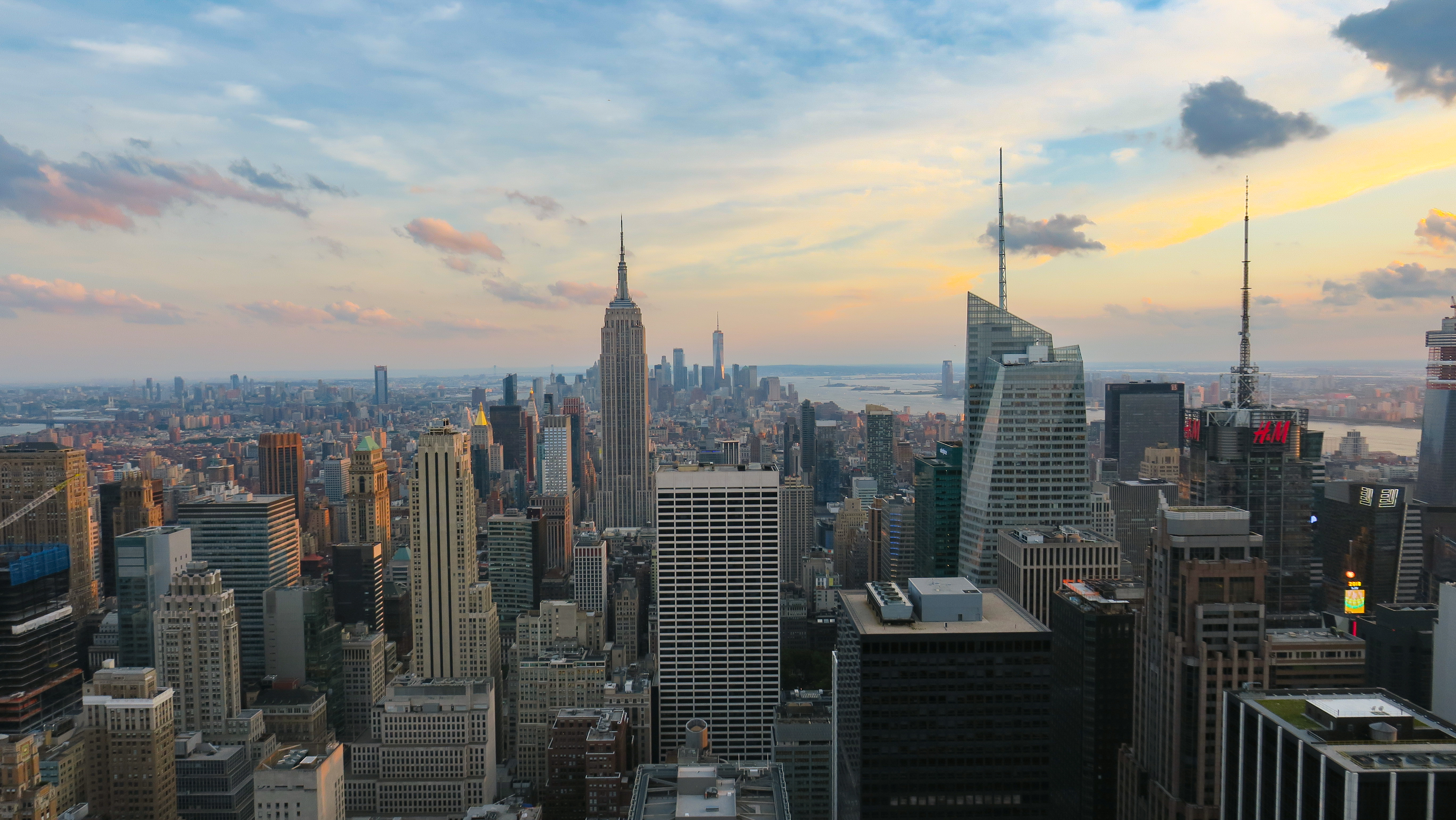
The New York City Metropolitan Area is home to the largest European population in the United States.

Breakdowns of the European American population into sub-components is a difficult and rather arbitrary exercise. Farley (1991) argues that "because of ethnic intermarriage, the numerous generations that separate respondents from their forebears and the apparent unimportance to many whites of European origin, responses appear quite inconsistent".

=== Ancestral origins ===
Ethnic origin	1980 / %		1990 / %		2000 / %		2020 / %		change 2000–2020
United States pop.	226,545,805	100.0	248,709,873	100.0	281,421,906	100.0	331,449,281	100.0	▲7.4%
At least one ancestry reported	188,302,438	83.1	224,788,502	90.4	225,310,411	80.1	TBA	TBA	
Acadian/Cajun	—N/a	—N/a	668,271	0.3	85,414	0.0	132,624	0.1	
Albanian	38,658	0.02	47,710	0.0	113,661	0.0	236,635	0.1	
Alsatian	42,390	0.02	16,465	0.0	15,601	0.0	12,056	0.00	
American (Note: The category "American" or "United States" was under "ancestry not specified" in the 1980 and 1990 census results. However they are shown separately in the 2000 census comparison brief showing 12,395,999 as American and 643,561 as United States in 1990.)	13,298,761	5.9	12,395,999	5.0	20,625,093	7.3	-	-	
Austrian	948,558	0.42	864,783	0.3	735,128	0.3	697,425	0.3	
Basque	43,140	0.0	47,956	0.0	57,793	0.0	52,559	0.0	
Bavarian	—N/a	—N/a	4,348	0.0	-	-	-	-	-
Belarusian	7,381	0.00	4,277	0.0	-	-	67,599	0.0	
Belgian	360,277	0.16	380,498 (Note: Excludes Flemish.)	0.2	360,642	0.1	384,224	0.2	
British	—N/a	—N/a	1,119,154	0.4	1,085,720	0.4	860,315	0.4	
British Islander	—N/a	—N/a	—N/a	—N/a	—N/a	—N/a	43,654	0.0	
Bulgarian	42,504	0.02	29,595	0.0	55,489	0.0	102,968	0.0	
Carpatho Rusyn	—N/a	—N/a	7,602	0.0			9,747	0.00	
Celtic	—N/a	—N/a	29,652	0.0	65,638	0.0	30,630	0.0	
Cornish	—N/a	—N/a	3,991	0.0	-	-	6,257	0.0	
Croatian	252,970	0.11	544,270	0.2	374,241	0.1	448,479	0.2	
Cypriot	6,053	0.00	4,897	0.0	7,663	0.0	10,384	0.00	
Czech	1,892,456	0.84	1,296,411 (Note: Excludes Moravian.)	0.5	1,262,527	0.4	1,397,780	0.6	
Czechoslovak	—N/a	—N/a	315,285	0.1	441,403	0.2	-	-	
Danish	1,518,273	0.67	1,634,669	0.7	1,430,897	0.5	1,314,209	0.6	
Dutch	6,304,499	2.78	6,227,089	2.5	4,542,494	1.6	3,649,179	1.6	
Eastern European (Note: This category represents a general type response, which may encompass several ancestry groups.)	62,404	0.03	132,332	0.1	-	-	-	-	
English	49,598,035	21.89	32,651,788	13.1	24,515,138	8.7	46,550,968	19.8	
Estonian	25,994	0.01	26,762	0.0	25,034	0.0	30,054	0.0	
European	175,461	0.08	466,718	0.2	1,968,696	0.7	-	-	
Finnish	615,872	0.27	658,870	0.3	623,573	0.2	684,373	0.3	
Flemish	—N/a	—N/a	14,157	0.0			384,224	0.2	
French	12,892,246	5.69	10,320,935	4.1	8,309,908	3.0	7,994,088	3.4	
French Canadian	780,488	0.34	2,167,127	0.9	2,349,684	0.8	933,740	0.4	
German	49,224,146	21.73	57,947,171 (Note: Excludes Bavarian, Prussian, Saxon, and West German.)	23.3	42,885,162	15.2	44,978,546	19.1	
German Russian	—N/a	—N/a	10,153	0.0	10,535	0.0			
Greek	959,856	0.42	1,110,373	0.4	1,153,307	0.4	568,564	0.2	
Hungarian	1,776,902	0.78	1,582,302	0.6	1,398,724	0.5	684,373	0.3	
Icelandic	32,586	0.01	40,529	0.0	42,716	0.0	55,602	0.0	
Irish	40,165,702	17.73	38,735,539 (Note: Excludes Northern Irish and Celtic.)	15.6	30,528,492	10.8	38,597,428	16.4	
Italian	12,183,692	5.38	14,664,550 (Note: Excludes Sicilian.)	5.9	15,723,555	5.6	16,813,235	7.1	
Latvian	92,141	0.04	100,331	0.0	87,564	0.0	92,944	0.0	
Lithuanian	742,776	0.33	811,865	0.3	659,992	0.2	711,089	0.3	
Luxemburger	49,994	0.02	49,061	0.0	45,139	0.0	57,359	0.0	
Macedonian	—N/a	—N/a	20,365	0.0	38,051	0.0	51,401	0.0	
Maltese	31,645	0.01	39,600	0.0	40,159	0.0	44,874	0.0	
Manx	9,220	0.00	6,317	0.0	6,955	0.0	8,704	0.0	
Moravian	—N/a	—N/a	3,781	0.0	-	-	-	-	
Northern Irelander	16,418	0.01	4,009	0.0	3,693	0.0	5,181	0.0	
Norwegian	3,453,839	1.52	3,869,395	1.6	4,477,725	1.6	3,836,884	1.6	
Pennsylvania German	—N/a	—N/a	305,841	0.1	255,807	0.1	169,821	0.1	
Polish	8,228,037	3.63	9,366,106	3.8	8,977,444	3.2	8,599,601	3.7	
Portuguese	1,024,351	0.45	1,153,351	0.5	1,177,112	0.4	1,454,262	0.6	
Prussian	—N/a	—N/a	25,469	0.0	-	-	-	-	
Romanian	315,258	0.14	365,544	0.1	367,310	0.1	416,545	0.2	
Russian	2,781,432	1.23	2,952,987	1.2	2,652,214	0.9	2,412,131	1.0	
Saxon	—N/a	—N/a	4,519	0.0	—N/a	—N/a	—N/a	—N/a	
Scandinavian	475,007	0.21	678,880	0.3	425,099	0.2	1,217,333	0.5	
Scots-Irish	—N/a	—N/a	5,617,773	2.3	4,319,232	1.5	794,478	0.3	
Scottish	10,048,816	4.44	5,393,581	2.2	4,890,581	1.7	8,422,613	3.6	
Serbian	100,941	0.04	116,795	0.0	140,337	0.0	204,380	0.1	
Sicilian	—N/a	—N/a	50,389	0.0	-	-	-	-	
Slavic	172,696	0.08	76,931	0.0	127,137	0.0	180,316	0.1	
Slovak	776,806	0.34	1,882,897	0.8	797,764	0.3	691,455	0.3	
Slovenian	126,463	0.06	124,437	0.1	176,691	0.1	196,513	0.1	
Soviet	—N/a	—N/a	7,729	0.0	-	-	-	-	
Spaniards	94,528	0.04	360,935	0.1	299,948	0.1	978,978	0.4	
Swedish	4,345,392	1.92	4,680,863	1.9	3,998,310	1.4	3,839,796	1.6	
Swiss	981,543	0.43	1,045,495	0.4	911,502	0.3	946,179	0.4	
Ukrainian	730,056	0.32	740,723	0.3	892,922	0.3	953,509	0.4	
Welsh	1,664,598	0.73	2,033,893	0.8	1,753,794	0.6	1,977,383	0.8	
West German	—N/a	—N/a	3,885	0.0	-	-	-	-	
Yugoslav	360,174	0.16	257,994	0.1	328,547	0.1	-	-	

== Culture ==
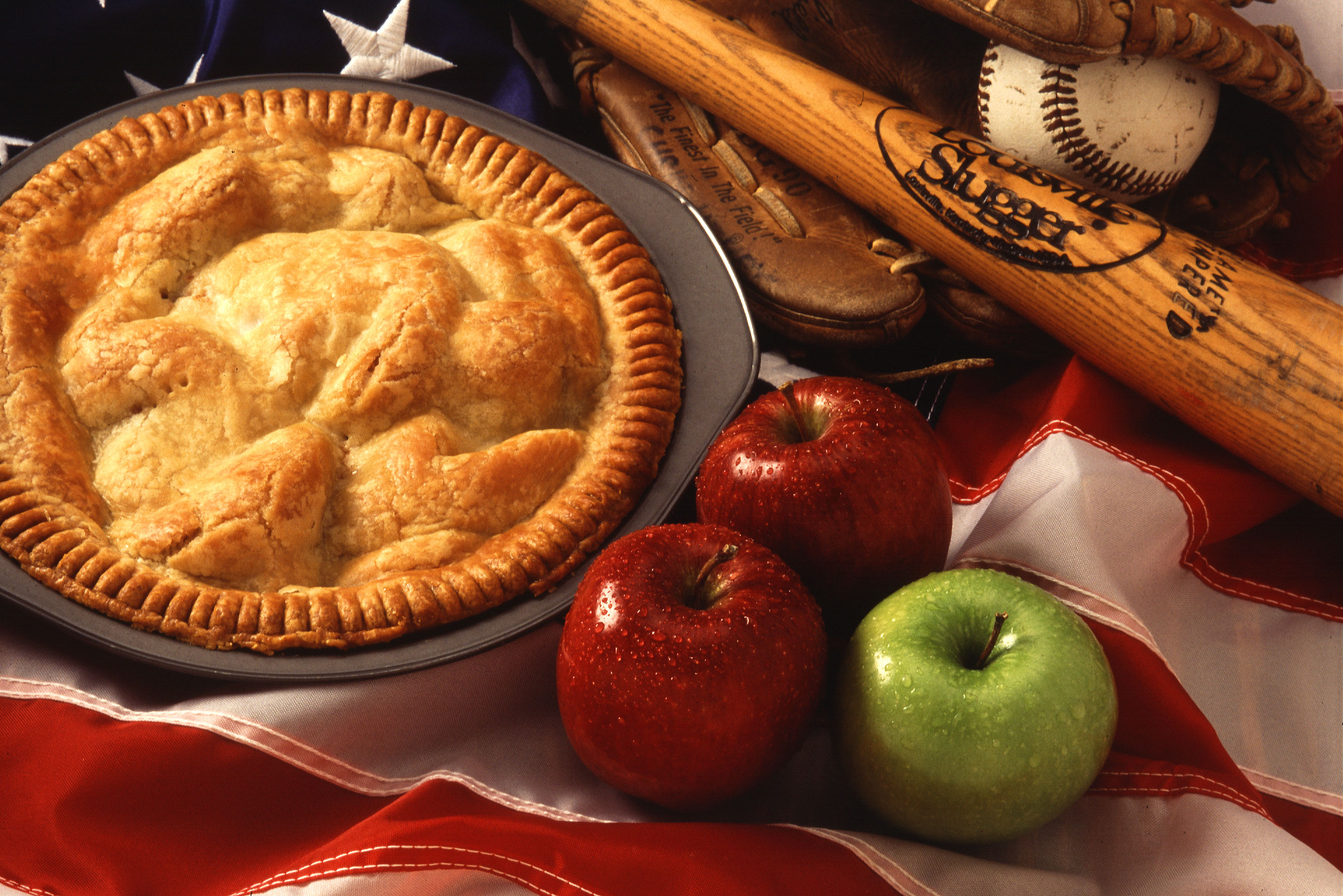
American cultural icons, apple pie, baseball, and the American flag. All have European influence, primarily from the British.

As the largest component of the American population, the overall American culture deeply reflects the European-influenced culture that predates the United States of America as an independent state. Much of American culture shows influences from the diverse nations of the United Kingdom and Ireland, such as the English, Irish, Cornish, Manx, Scotch-Irish, Scottish and Welsh. Colonial ties to the United Kingdom spread the English language, legal system and other cultural attributes.

Scholar David Hackett Fischer asserts in Albion's Seed: Four British Folkways in America that the folkways of four groups of people who moved from distinct regions of the United Kingdom to the United States persisted and provide a substantial cultural basis for much of the modern United States. Fischer explains "the origins and stability of a social system which for two centuries has remained stubbornly democratic in its politics, capitalist in its economy, libertarian in its laws and individualist in its society and pluralistic in its culture."

Much of the European-American cultural lineage can be traced back to Western and Northern Europe, which is institutionalized in the government, traditions, and civic education in the United States. Since most later European Americans have assimilated into American culture, many Americans of European ancestry now generally express their personal ethnic ties sporadically and symbolically and do not consider their specific ethnic origins to be essential to their identity; however, European American ethnic expression has been revived since the 1960s. Some European Americans such as Italians, Greeks, Poles, Germans, Ukrainians, Irish, and others have maintained high levels of ethnic identity. In the 1960s, the melting pot ideal to some extent gave way to increased interest in cultural pluralism, strengthening affirmations of ethnic identity among various American ethnic groups, European as well as others.

=== Entertainment ===
- Walt Disney was a cultural symbol in American film entertainment of Anglo-Irish, German and English descent. (Note: Disney was a descendant of Robert d'Isigny, a Frenchman who had traveled to England with William the Conqueror in 1066. The family anglicized the d'Isigny name to "Disney" and settled in the English village now known as Norton Disney in the East Midlands.) Through animation embodying 20th-century American values of optimism, innovation, and storytelling. Disney created iconic characters like Mickey Mouse and Donald Duck.

=== Law ===
The American legal system also has its roots in French philosophy with the separation of powers and the federal system along with English law in common law.

=== Cuisine ===
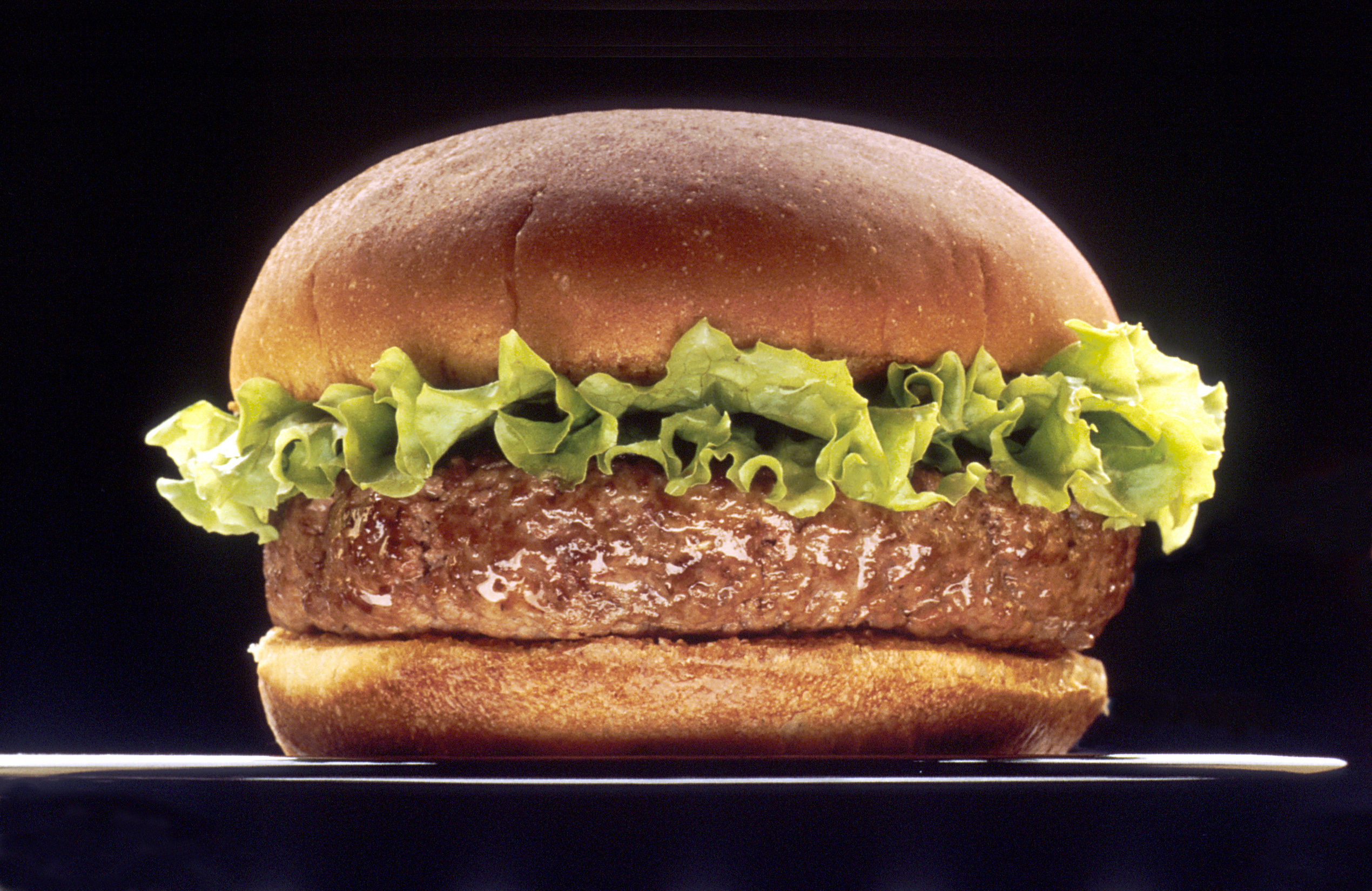
Hamburgers were invented by German immigrants.

- Apple pie – New England was the first region to experience large-scale English colonization in the early 17th century, beginning in 1620, and it was dominated by East Anglian Calvinists, better known as the Puritans. Baking was a particular favorite of the New Englanders and was the origin of dishes seen today as quintessentially "American", such as apple pie and the oven-roasted Thanksgiving turkey, a bird that although not found in Europe has become linked in tradition and symbolism to the early European immigrants. "As American as apple pie" is a well-known phrase used to suggest that something is all-American.
- Hamburger – Although the origins of the hamburger, including the country in which it was first served, are subjects of debate, the hamburger first became widely marketed in the United States and has been internationally known for decades as a symbol of American fast food.
- Buffalo wings – Invented in 1964 at Anchor Bar in Buffalo, New York by Italian-American Teressa Bellissimo. Now popular all over the country, it has become a symbol of American cuisine.
- Hot dog – Hot dogs were brought to New York by German immigrants.
- Pizza – Italian immigrants from Naples brought pizza to the United States.
- Fried chicken – Scottish immigrants brought fried chicken to the Southern United States. Enslaved African Americans began cooking fried chicken based on the recipes from white Scottish slaveholders.

=== Thanksgiving ===
- Thanksgiving – In the United States, it has become a national secular holiday (official since 1863) with religious origins. The first Thanksgiving was celebrated by British settlers to give thanks to God and the Native Americans for helping the Pilgrims of Plymouth Colony survive the brutal winter. The modern Thanksgiving holiday traces its origins from a 1621 celebration at the Plymouth Plantation, where the Plymouth settlers held a harvest feast with the Native Americans after a successful growing season. William Bradford is credited as the first to proclaim the American cultural event which is generally referred to as the "First Thanksgiving".

=== Sports ===
- Baseball – The earliest recorded game of base-ball involved the family of the Prince of Wales, played indoors in London in November 1748. The Prince is reported as playing "Bass-Ball" again in September 1749 in Walton-on-Thames, Surrey, against Lord Middlesex. English lawyer William Bray recorded a game of baseball on Easter Monday 1755 in Guildford, Surrey; Bray's diary was verified as authentic in September 2008. This early form of the game was apparently brought to North America by English immigrants. The first appearance of the term that exists in print was in "A Little Pretty Pocket-Book" in 1744, where it is called Base-Ball.
- American football – can be traced to modified early versions of rugby football played in England and Canadian football mixed with and ultimately changed by American innovations which led over time to the finished version of the game from 1876 to now. The basic set of rules was first developed in American universities in the mid-19th century.
- Golf - Golf originated from Scotland in the 15th century, the first course in Scotland being St Andrews. The first golf course in America was founded by a Scot John Reid in 1888, and was named after the first Scottish golf club Saint Andrew's Golf Club located in Yonkers, New York, from here golf soared as a national hobby, and by the turn of the 20th Century there was more than 1,000 golf courses in North America.

=== Music ===
Another area of cultural influence are American Patriotic songs:

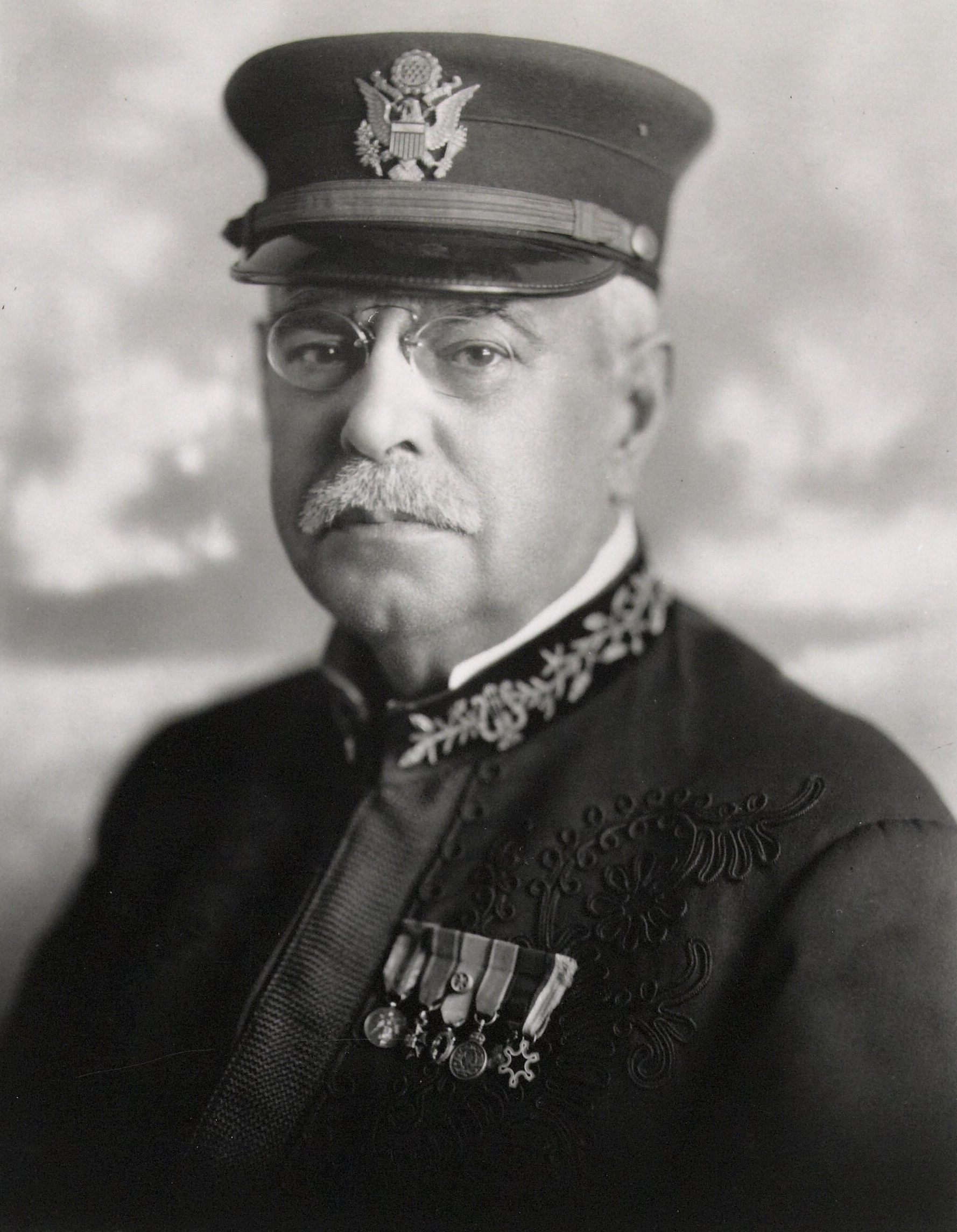
John Philip Sousa composed The Washington Post, a patriotic American march.

- The Star-Spangled Banner – takes its melody from the 18th-century English song "To Anacreon in Heaven" written by John Stafford Smith for the Anacreontic Society, a men's social club in London and lyrics written by American Francis Scott Key. This became a well-known and recognized patriotic song throughout the United States, which was officially designated as the American national anthem in 1931.

Before 1931, other songs served as the hymns of American officialdom.

- Amazing Grace – written by British poet and clergyman John Newton. Popular among African Americans, it became an icon in American culture and has been used for a variety of secular purposes and marketing campaigns.
- Hail, Columbia – initial presidential inauguration song up until early 20th century. Now used for the Vice President.
- Battle Hymn of the Republic – Patriotic song sung during the civil war time between 1861 and 1865.

=== American Space program ===
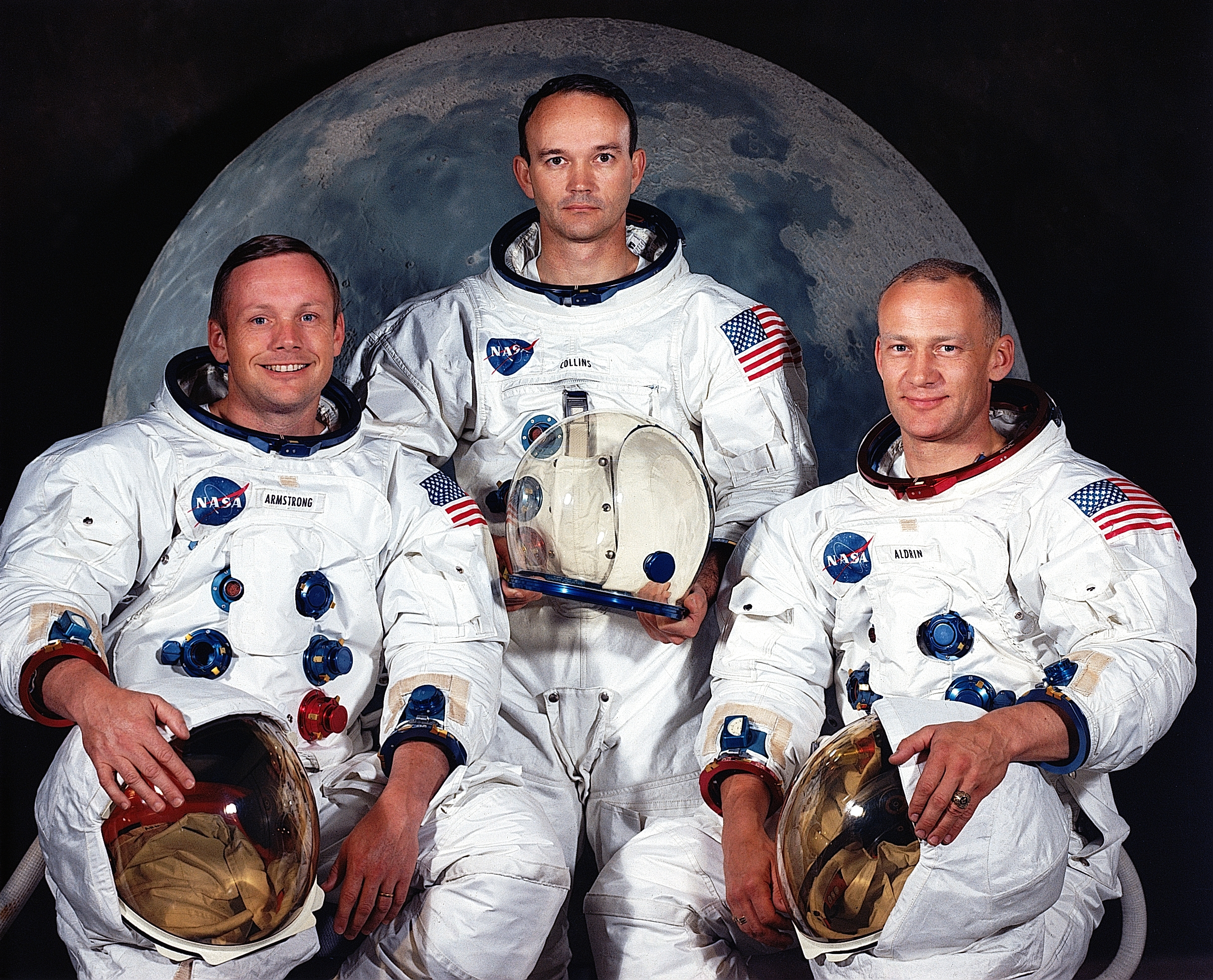
Apollo 11 crew, Commander Neil Armstrong, Michael Collins and Buzz Aldrin.

All of the astronauts who have walked on the moon have been of European descent. The first landing on the moon was by the Apollo 11 crew, Commander Neil Armstrong, civilian test pilot, Command Module Pilot Michael Collins and Lunar Module Pilot Buzz Aldrin (Swedish descent). Armstrong and Aldrin were the first to walk on the moon.

== Admixture in Whites ==
Some European Americans have varying amounts of Native American and Native African ancestry. From the 23andMe database, about 5 to at least 13 percent of self-identified European American Southerners have greater than 1 percent native African ancestry. Southern states with the highest African American populations tended to have the highest percentages of hidden African ancestry. European Americans on average are: "98.6 percent Native European, 0.19 percent Native African and 0.18 percent Native American." Inferred British/Irish ancestry is found in European Americans from all states at mean proportions of above 20%, and represents a majority of ancestry, above 50% mean proportion, in states such as Mississippi, Arkansas, and Tennessee. Scandinavian ancestry in European Americans is highly localized; most states show only trace mean proportions of Scandinavian ancestry, while it comprises a significant proportion, upwards of 10%, of ancestry in European Americans from Minnesota and the Dakotas.

== See also ==
- American ancestry
- Anglo
- Ancestral background of presidents of the United States
- Ethnic groups in Europe
- European Canadians
- European Oceanians
- Immigration to the United States
- Melting pot
- Non-Latino whites
- Stereotypes of white Americans
- White Americans
- White Anglo-Saxon Protestant
- White ethnic
- White Latino Americans
- White Southerners
- Romani Americans
- American Jews
- European Mexicans
- White Americans in California
- White Latin Americans
- Colonial history of the United States
- Hispanic and Latino Americans
- White demographic decline
- European emigration
- European Australians
- Argentines of European descent
- Venezuelans of European descent
- European Moroccans
- European Pakistanis
- European Tunisians
- Peruvians of European descent
- Hyphenated American
