= Armenians in Afghanistan =

There was a small community of Afghan Armenians (Note: Pashto: افغان ارمنیان, romanized: Afǧān Armanyān, pronounced [ɐvˈɣɑn ɐɾmɐnˈjɑn]; Dari: ارمنی‌های افغانستان, romanized: Armanīhā-yi Afǧānistān, pronounced [ɐɾˌmɐniːˈhɑːjɪ ɐvˌɣɑːnɪsˈtʰɑːn]; Armenian: Աֆղանահայեր, romanized: Afghanahayer, pronounced [ɑfʁɑnɑhɑˈjɛɾ]) centred in Kabul, Afghanistan.

== Pre-modern settlements ==
During the rule of the Arsacid dynasty in Armenia (AD 1st–5th centuries), Armenians, among other peoples, were forcibly resettled in the eastern territories of Iran, such as Sakastan (modern-day Sistan) and Khorasan. Some of these deportees settled in the territories that later became known as Afghanistan. These Armenians eventually assimilated into the local population. Another deportation of Armenians to Afghanistan occurred under Timur in the 14th century; the deportees were mainly settled in Kandahar and Kabul. These deportees, too, assimilated into the local population.

== Modern community ==
With the development of Armenian mercantile activity in the 17th century, Armenian merchants, especially those from New Julfa (a suburb of the Safavid capital of Isfahan), began to pass through Afghanistan more frequently, as one of the overland caravan routes traversed that country, specifically through Kabul and Kandahar. Armenian merchants established their own caravansaries in those settlements, which eventually grew into permanent Armenian communities. By 1670 there was a "thriving" Armenian community at Kabul. By 1707 the Armenians had received certain privileges from the Mughal rulers of Kabul, such as freedom of movement, freedom from sartorial restrictions, and tax concessions.

In the first quarter of the 18th century, much of Safavid Iran was overrun by Afghan tribes. In 1722, the Afghan leader Mahmud Hotak conquered the Safavid capital of Isfahan and exacted heavy tributes from the Armenians of New Julfa. Mahmud also forcibly resettled from there about sixty families of Armenian merchants and craftsmen to Kabul. Sometime later, either the Afghans or Nader Shah took another 200–300 Armenian families to Afghanistan to encourage the overland trade with India. In 1737, the Armenians of Kabul were allowed to build their own church. The church was located on a street in the Bala Hissar fortress. In 1755, Jesuit missionary Joseph Tiefenthaler reported that Sultan Ahmad Shah Bahadur took several Armenian gunners from Lahore to Kabul.

In 1763, the Armenian catholicos Hakob V (r. 1759–1763) sent a vardapet (celibate priest) named Anania to tend to the spiritual needs of the Armenian community in Afghanistan, but the priest died on the way. The next year, another vardapet named Grigor of Sanahin was sent to Afghanistan, but nothing is known about his activities there. Three other noted Armenian clergymen of the 18th century attempted, without success, to address the needs of the Afghan Armenian community: Catholicos Simeon of Yerevan, Archbishop Hovsep Arghutian, and the prelate of New Julfa, into whose diocese the Armenians of Afghanistan fell. Archbishop Arghutian sent two priests from Astrakhan to Afghanistan, but their fate is unknown. At the end of the 18th century there were 30–40 Armenian families in Kabul, and a smaller number in Kandahar. The Indo-Persian diocese at Julfa sent Armenian priests to the community; however, after the priest died in the 1830s, no replacement was sent and services were conducted by the deacon.

A number of early British explorers and travellers stayed with the Kabul Armenians including George Forster (1793), Edward Stirling (1828) and Charles Masson (1832). When the Anglican missionary Joseph Wolff arrived in Kabul shortly after Masson, he preached in the Armenian church and by his account the community numbered about 23 people. In 1793 George Foster said there were around 100 Armenians in Kabul and there were also a few living in Kandahar and Herat. Alexander Burnes reported that there were 21 Armenians in Kabul while General Josiah Harlan claims there were 15. Early travellers noted that the Armenians made wine, some were members of the Amir's personal body guard, the ghulam khana, others were traders and some owned land between the Bala Hisar and But Khak. They also served as bankers in Kabul and had colonies in Ghazni. Letters from Armenian merchants in Afghanistan show that in 1799 they had trade links with Transcaucasia (especially Tiflis) and the Ottoman Empire (Istanbul). Later sources show that their mercantile activities reached trading centres like Dera Ismail Khan and beyond the Central Asian khanates.

The British traveller Charles Masson (real name James Lewis) visited Afghanistan in the 19th century and documented his interactions with the Armenians of Afghanistan during his time in Kabul:

Living with the Armenians of the city, I witnessed every day the terms of equality on which they dwelt amongst their Máhomedan neighbours. The Armenian followed the Máhomedan corpse to its place of burial; the Máhomedan showed the same mark of respect to the deceased of the Armenian community. They mutually attended each others' weddings, and participated in the little matters which spring up in society. The Armenian presented gifts on Id Noh Roz [i.e. Nowruz], or the Mahomedan new year's day [sic]; he received them on his own Christmas-day. If it had happened that a Máhomedan had married an Armenian female who was lost to the Church of the Cross, I found that the Armenians had retaliated, and brought Máhomedan females into their families, and inducted them into their faith. An Armenian, in conversation with the present head of the Wais family said, that some perms had called him a kâfr or infidel. The reply was, "He that calls you a kâfr is a kâfr himself." It is something for a Christian to reside with Máhomedans so tolerant and unprejudiced. Wine, prohibited to be made or sold in the city, is permitted to be made and used by Armenians, who are simply restricted to indulge in their own houses.

In 1839 during the First Anglo-Afghan War (1839–1842) the Rev. G. Piggott, army chaplain of Bombay Army Division, visited the Armenian church in Kabul and baptised two Armenian children. In 1843 the Rev. I. N. Allen, who accompanied General Pollock's Army of Retribution, also visited the Armenian church and recorded that:

After some inquiry, we discovered them in a street in the Bala Hissar, leading from the Jellalabad Gate; their buildings were on the north side of the street. We went up an alley, and turned into a small court on the left, surrounded by buildings, and filled with the implements of their trade. A little door led from this court into their church, a small dark building, but on procuring lights, I found that it was carpeted, and kept clean, apparently with great care. Its aspect was due east to west, and an altar stood on the east, surmounted by a small picture of a Holy Family, much dimmed by smoke and dust. Upon the altar were six candlesticks, two small crosses, and two copies of the Holy Gospels. In front, without the altar rails, was a small desk, on which lay a book of Daily Prayer, in Armenian. The altar was not against the wall, but had a space behind and stood on a raises step. Our guides showed me a volume containing the gospels in Armenian, and another with the epistles, also a small English pocket Bible with clasps, Oxford edition, which I think was said to have been bought from an Hindoostanee. They state that their body came into Affghanistan [sic] with Nadir Shah; that they were then two hundred families, but were now reduced to four, comprising 35 persons, men, women and children.

During the British occupation, two leading members of Kabul's Armenian community supplied the British army with fodder, a fact which did not go unnoticed and after the British withdrawal the community suffered increased persecution and many were allowed to leave for Persia or India. However, at least three families remained behind. In 1848 Major G. Lawrence in Peshawar received a newsletter from his agent in Kabul reporting that Amir Dost Muhammad Khan's fourth son, Sardar Muhammad Azim Khan, planned to marry one of the daughters Timur, a leader of the Armenian community. Timur apparently appealed for Lawrence to use his influence with the Amir to prevent the marriage, but while Lawrence wrote to the Amir he satisfied himself that the marriage was not forced and the wedding went ahead. However, Timur's daughter was not forced to convert to Islam and continued to practice her Christian faith. Later she gave birth to a son, Muhammad Ishaq Khan who in 1888, as governor of Afghan Turkistan, rebelled against his cousin, Amir 'Abd al-Rahman Khan, only for the revolt to be crushed. Ishaq Khan fled to Russian-controlled Samarkand but his mother. Lucas and his brother, were imprisoned in Ghazni for several years.

British missionaries were interested in using the Armenian community as a base from which to conduct missionary work in Kabul; however, the community themselves reported that they had only converted one Afghan to Christianity, a robber who fell three times while attempting to break into their church to steal the valuable silver vessels stored therein, and then upon being discovered, begged for mercy and baptism. As late as 1870, British reports showed 18 Armenian Christians remaining in Kabul. One Armenian man named Lucas A. Joseph, also known by the name Sarwar ad-din Khan, managed the gunpowder factory at Jalalabad. The Armenian church at Bala Hisar was levelled by order of General Roberts in the spring of 1880 during the Second Anglo-Afghan War; the community did not receive any compensation from the British despite Roberts' promise of allocating them a new building. Prior to the church's destruction the Rev. Imam Shah, the first 'native' Anglican priest of All Saints Church, Peshawar, visited the Kabul community where he administered Holy Communion and baptised a number of individuals, including adults. According to Mesrovb Jacob Seth, in 1896 Amir Abdur Rahman Khan, sent a letter to the Armenian community at Calcutta, India, asking that they send ten or twelve families to Kabul to "relieve the loneliness" of their fellow Christians whose numbers had continued to dwindle. However, despite an initial reply of interest, in the end, none of the Armenians of Calcutta accepted the offer.

An Armenian, who has been identified as Yahya, and who designated himself as 'translator of the Amir' on the British traveller John Alfred Gray's marriage certificate and who may have been a son or close relative of Lucas A. Joseph, acted as interpreter for Gray during his time in Kabul. Gray published a photograph of himself and "the Armenian" in his book, though he never names his interpreter. Yahya accompanied Gray when he returned to England to get married, he also later accompanied Sardar Nasr Allah Khan on his state visit to England. According to an unpublished letter in the hands of Dr Gray's descendants, Yahya was approached by British intelligence who wanted him to send confidential reports to India about the situation in Kabul, only for him to refuse as it was far too dangerous. However, on his return to Kabul the paranoid Amir 'Abd al-Rahman Khan suspected him of spying and in December 1897 he and all his extended family were expelled to Peshawar. Yahya, Lucas and all his family, including at least one babe-in-arms, arrived in Peshawar destitute and were eventually housed in the CMS Zenana Mission's hujra in Gor Khatri Bazaar. Lucas and his heirs eventually adopted the surname of Joseph and became citizens of India and later Pakistan.

Some Armenians came with the Red Army during the Soviet invasion of Afghanistan; these veterans were reportedly interested in returning to Afghanistan again when Armenia announced in July 2009 that it would deploy medical specialists and interpreters in aid of the United Nations' International Security Assistance Force. In 2010 an Armenian Orthodox chapel was established for the use of ISAF's Armenian contingent in Qunduz.

== See also ==
- Afghanistan–Armenia relations
- Turks in Afghanistan
- Russians in Afghanistan
