= Czech Republic–Pakistan relations =

- Czech Republic: Pakistan

Diplomatic mission
- Pakistani Embassy, Prague: Czech Embassy, Islamabad

Envoy
- Ambassador: Ambassador H.E. Mr. Mohammad Khalid Jamali

Czech Republic–Pakistan relations are bilateral relations between the Czech Republic and Pakistan. Czech diplomatic relations with Pakistan were formally established on 27 September 1950 by Czechoslovakia and re-established by the Czech Republic in 1991. Pakistan has an embassy in Prague and the Czech Republic has an embassy in Islamabad.

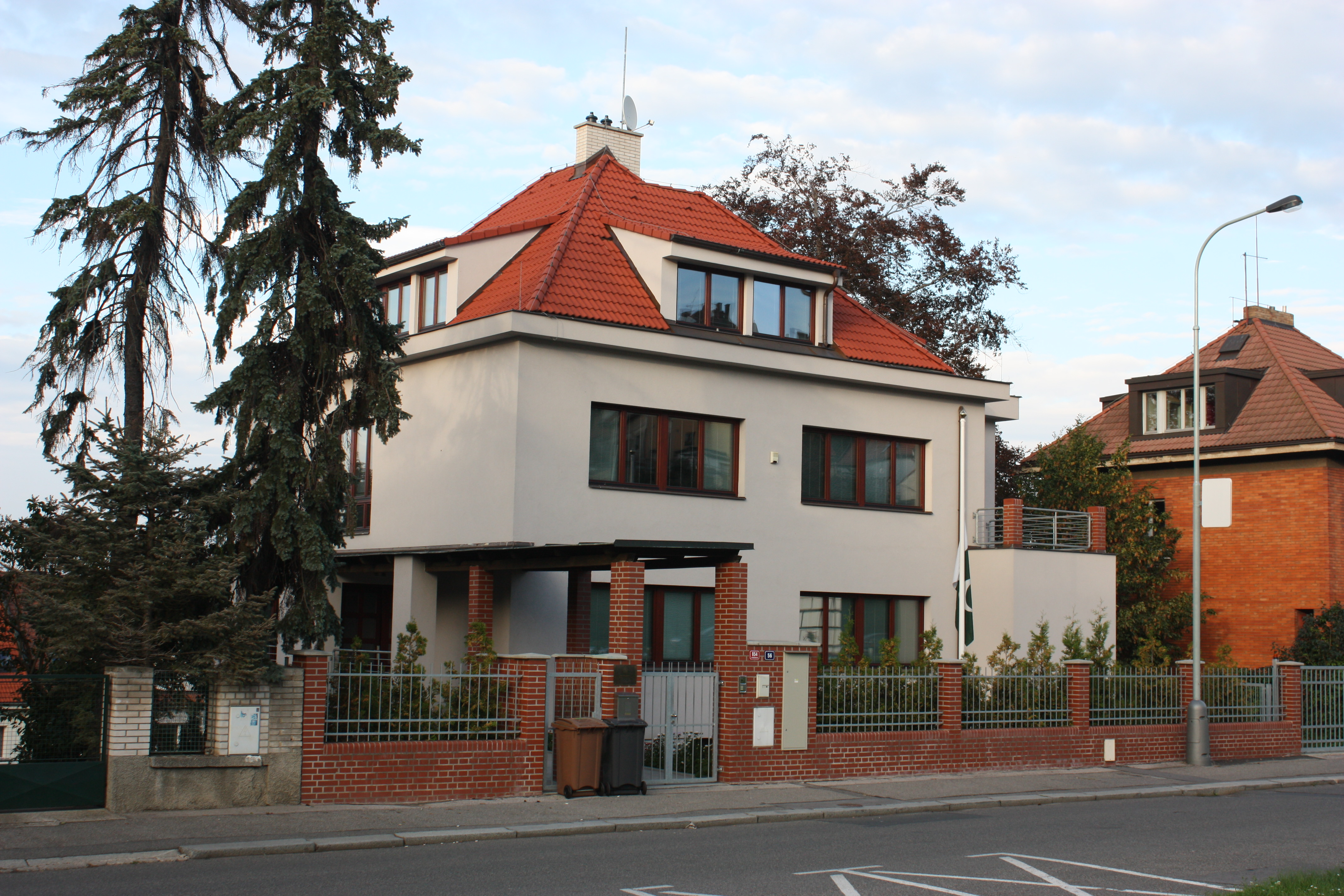
Pakistani Embassy in Prague

== Trade ==
Bilateral annual trade between the two countries is around US$100 million. Czech major imports from Pakistan include textile and leather, whereas Pakistan main imports from Czech Republic include machinery, paper & paperboard and electrical and electronic equipment. Czech Republic has made investment in medical equipment, pharmaceuticals and textiles in Pakistan.

== Diplomatic missions ==
- Pakistan has an embassy in Prague.
- Czech Republic has an embassy in Islamabad, and three honorary consulates in Karachi, Lahore and Peshawar.

== Defense cooperation ==
Pakistan and Czech Republic have also signed a memorandum of understanding (MoU) to increase military and defence cooperation between the two countries. Pakistan Minister for Defence Production, Abdul Qayyum Jatoi and Czech Republic visiting deputy prime minister and defence minister of Czech Republic Martin Bartak and signed the MoU on behalf of their countries. In 2017, the Česká zbrojovka (CZ) confirmed that it had finalized agreements over the sale of arms technology to the Pakistan Ordnance Factories (POF). The Czech company PBS Velká Bíteš has also sold 100 miniature turbofan engines for Pakistani drones.

In 2016, the Czech defense ministry expressed interests in having Czech troops trained by the Pakistani military.

== Cultural relations ==
Both countries try to develop their cultural relations through tourism and education.

== People of Czech-Pakistani descent ==
- Nargis Fakhri - American actress born to a Pakistani father and Czech mother.

== Resident diplomatic missions ==
- the Czech Republic has an embassy in Islamabad.
- Pakistan has an embassy in Prague.

== See also ==
- Foreign relations of the Czech Republic
- Foreign relations of Pakistan
- Pakistan–European Union relations
- List of diplomatic missions of the Czech Republic
- List of diplomatic missions of Pakistan
