= Russians in Afghanistan =

- (Russia) (Afghanistan)

Total population
- 1,500 (2009 est.)

Regions with significant populations
- Balkh Province and Kabul

Languages
- Russian, Pashto, Dari

Religion
- Russian Orthodoxy, Sunni Islam

There are currently estimated to be 1,500 Russians in Afghanistan, which in this article refers not only to ethnic Russians, but also to any citizens of Russia.

In the 1960s and 1970s, due to cooperation between the Soviet Union and Afghanistan, there were roughly 10,000 Russian expatriate engineers, interpreters, construction workers, and other similar professionals living in the country, a figure which had grown to 15,000 by the eve of the Soviet–Afghan War in 1979. However, they mostly left the country during or after the war.

There was also some Russian-language media, but it closed down during the period of Taliban government in the late 1990s.

Some Russians remained. A peculiar example of one is Noor Mohammad, previously named Sergei Yurevich Krasnoperov, who lives in Afghanistan and considers himself a proud Afghan. He fought in the Soviet–Afghan War, before converting to Islam and deserting to the Mujahideen. After the war, he decided not to return to Russia. He now has a wife and 6 children in Afghanistan. According to estimates there are about 500 Russian derserters or POWs now living in Afghanistan, who have even converted to Islam and married local woman and seemingly integrated into Afghan society. Nikolai Bistrov, was personal bodyguard of Ahmad Shah Massoud, Khakim Bakhretdinov is now Sheikh Abdula, Sergei Kransnoperov, whose local name is Noormomad lives in Chaghcharan, and Alexander Levenets, whose local name is Ahmad has done Hajj to Mecca. Many deserters chose not to return as they feared not to be hailed as "war heroes," despite the amnesty for them announced in 1989. While most are happy, some like Gennady Tsevma or Nek Mohammad, originally from Ukraine are not happy yet chose to stay back.

In Balkh Province, near the border with Uzbekistan, there are also reported to be numerous Russian businessmen, who have established ventures in the food, transport, and tourism industries. There are also Russian Jews with dual Russian and Israeli passports, who have been reported to be occasionally harassed by the local security forces following discovery of Israeli citizenship. Afghanistan does not recognise Israeli passports, although bribery is not uncommon.

== See also ==
- Afghans in Russia
- Armenians in Afghanistan
- Demographics of Afghanistan
- Russians in Pakistan
