= Portuguese in Pakistan =

Total population
- 64 (Portuguese nationals) + several thousand descendants.

Regions with significant populations
- Karachi, Islamabad, Hyderabad and Lahore.

Languages
- Urdu, Punjabi, and other Languages of Pakistan, minority still speak Portuguese, Indo-Portuguese.

Religion
- Mostly Roman Catholicism, minority of Islam and Irreligion.

Related ethnic groups
- Portuguese people, Luso-Indian, Burgher people.

Portuguese in Pakistan are citizens or residents of Pakistan who are of Portuguese background. As of 2021 there are only 64 Portuguese citizens registered as living in Pakistan.

== Background ==
The presence of a small Portuguese community in what is modern-day Pakistan is historically known. Most people of Portuguese extract can be found among the country's Goan community, concentrated in Karachi much before the independence of Pakistan. These settlers hailed from Goa in Western India and in order to avail economic opportunities, migrated to major commercial centres during the British Raj, Karachi being among them. In 1510, Goa was annexed by the Portuguese as one of its overseas colonies in India, and remained under Portuguese rule until the Indian annexation of Goa in 1961. During that period, the Goans remained Portuguese subjects and many who had settled in Karachi carried Portuguese passports, which they later relinquished for Pakistani citizenship. Portuguese rule in Goa established the presence of a Goan Catholic community, and exhibited Portuguese influences in Goan culture, language and cuisine, which the migrants brought along with them to Karachi. At the time of the partition in 1947, it is estimated that the Goan community in Karachi numbered up to 15,000.

== Culture ==
The Portuguese community assumed an active role in the founding of missionary schools throughout Pakistan. Portuguese musicians and bands were also active in the country's music scene and high social circles during the late twentieth century, performing in some of Karachi's most prominent hotels and nightclubs for several decades. Most of this generation of musicians later died or emigrated.

== Portuguese Pakistani ==
Name	Birth and Death	Occupation	Notes
Max Rodrigues	1938 -	Bishop	Portuguese Descent
Mervyn Middlecoat	1940 - 1971	Pakistani fighter pilot	Portuguese Descent
Bernadette Louise Dean	?	Academic	Portuguese Descent
Dilshad Vadsaria	1985	Actress	Portuguese Descent

== See also ==
- Luso-Indian
- Indo-Portuguese
- Portuguese India
