= Pakistan–European Union relations =

European Union-Pakistan relations
- European Union: Pakistan

European Union–Pakistan relations are the international relations between the common foreign policy and trade relations of the European Union and the Islamic Republic of Pakistan. There has been no EU State Leader's visit for over twenty years.

== Trade ==
In 1976, the first European Commission – Pakistan Commercial Cooperation Agreement was signed and 10 years later, a Commercial and Cooperation Agreement valid for 5 years is signed as well and with extensions by tacit agreement ever since.

The EU imports gemstones, minerals and oil from Pakistan as a trading partner.

In order to enhance Pakistan's capacity on the World Trade Organization (WTO) related issues, a trade-related technical assistance programme was launched in 2004 with a view to streamlining procedures and processes for trade facilitation in compliance with EU norms and standards.

In May 2007, the European Union and Pakistan set up a “Sub-Group on Trade” under the Pakistan-EU Joint Commission.

Since January 2014, Pakistan has benefitted from the Generalized System of Preferences Plus (GSP+). The GSP+ grants full removal of tariffs on over 66% of EU tariff lines. To benefit from the GSP+, Pakistan has to demonstrate progress towards the implementation of 27 global conventions related to good governance, human and labour rights, and environmental protection.

EU is Pakistan's biggest export destination. In 2019, the EU accounted for 33% of Pakistani external trade with Pakistani exports to the EU reaching €7.492 billion, composed by mainly textiles but also medical equipment and leather products while EU exports to Pakistan represented €5.545 billion (mainly mechanical and electrical equipment, but also chemical and pharmaceutical products.

On 29 April 2021, the European Parliament adopted a resolution demanding Pakistan to protect freedom for religious minorities and raising concerns about a number of human rights issues and asked the Commission and the European External Action Service (EEAS) to reconsider Pakistan's preferential trade (GSP+) status. Members of Parliament speaking during the debate in the plenary cited various incidents of members of religious minorities killed or imprisoned in Pakistan over accusations of blasphemy, but also pointed out other human rights abuses prevalent in the country.

== Political engagement ==
Diplomatic relations between Pakistan and the European Economic Community were established in 1962. In 1985, the European Commission opened an office in Islamabad that was upgraded 3 years later into a European Commission Delegation, including full diplomatic status and a Head of Delegation accredited as Ambassador to the Head of State of the Islamic Republic of Pakistan.

The European Union is sending an Election Observation Mission to monitor the parliamentary elections in Pakistan in 2002, 2008, 2013, as well as an Election Follow-up Mission in 2016 and in 2018, a way to strengthen the democratic process.

In December 2006, the Council of the European Union called on Afghanistan and Pakistan to deepen relations and to cooperate closely to deal with insecurity in border areas, while urging Pakistan to build on current efforts to prevent the use of its territory by the Taliban.

The EU and Pakistani relations led to a new strategic level with the European Union - Pakistani Summit that took place on 17 June 2009. This summit allowed to tackle various subjects like the strengthening of the EU-Pakistan partnership, the regional political situation, global issues and the world economy.

On 1 December 2009, with the Lisbon Treaty entering into force, the European Commission Delegation established in Pakistan became the “Delegation of the European Union to Pakistan”.

To set the basis for a strategic dialogue, a second Summit took place on 4 June 2010 and forged a partnership for peace and development rooted in shared values, principles and commitments.

Following the decisions taken during 2009 and 2010 European Union – Pakistan summits, the EU-Pakistan Five-year Engagement Plan came into force in 2012. The aim of this Plan was “to build a strategic relationship by forging a partnership for peace and development rooted in shared values, principles and commitments”. A second result of the European Union – Pakistan summits is the EU-Pakistan Strategic dialogue was held in Islamabad in June 2012. The European Union High Representative for Foreign Affairs and Security Policy/Vice-President of the European Commission (HR/VP), Catherine Ashton led the European Union Side while the Pakistani Foreign Minister Khar represented Pakistan. Two EU-Pakistan Strategic Dialogue were hold in March 2014 and in October 2016.

During the Strategic Dialogue of 2016, the two parties further strengthened their relationship and agreed to replace the EU-Pakistan Five-Year Engagement Plan with an EU-Pakistan Strategic Engagement Plan (SEP). In June 2019, the SEP was signed in Brussels between the EU and Pakistan. This plan is based on rules of international laws as well as on the Charter of the United Nations, on mutual respect, on trust as well as on common interests. The SEP includes traditional areas such as peace and security, democracy, rule of law, good governance, human rights, migration and mobility, trade and investment. But it also has introduced cooperation in additional increasingly important areas such as energy, climate change, connectivity, education and culture, and science and technology.

The current ambassador of the EU to Pakistan is Dr Riina Kionka since April 2022. The previous ambassadors of the European Union to Pakistan were Johannes De Kok (January 2011 to January 2011), Lars-Gunnar Wigemark (February 2011 to March 2015), Jean-François Cautain ( April 2015 to July 2019) and Androulla Kaminara (September 2019 to May 2022).

The Pakistani ambassador posted at Brussels is covering the EU, Belgium and Luxembourg. The first Pakistani ambassador was Mr. J.A. Rahim (April 1952 to 1953), the second one was Mr. Habibur Rahman (May 1956 to December 1958). Following him, Mr Iqbal Athar (March 1959 to December 1961), Mr. A1bdur Rahman Khan (March 1962 to December 1967), Mr. Riaz Piracha (October 1968 to October 1970), Mr. M. Masood (October 1970 to September 1973), Mr. Qamarul Islam (December 1973 to Januari 1979), Mr. V.A. Jaffery (April 1979 to August 1984), Mr. Mahadi Masood (October 1984 to March 1988), Mr. Munir Akram (June 1988 to December 1991), Mr. Rafat Mahdi (Augustus 1992 to February 1995), Mr. Riaz M. Khan (April 1995 to July 1998), Mr. S. K. Dehlavi (August 1998 to May 2001), Mr. Shaukat Umer (July 2001 to August 2002), Mr. Tariq Fatemi (September 2002 to July 2004), Mr. M. Saeed Khalib (March 2005 to June 2008), Mr. Shafkat Saeed (October 2008 to November 2009), Mr. Jalil Abbas Jilani (December 2009 to September 2012), Mr. Munawar Saeed Bhatti (October 2012 to March 2014), Ms. Naghmana Alamgir Hashmi (April 2014 to July 2019) and the current Pakistani Ambassador is Mr. Zaheer Aslam Janjua (since September 2019).

== Development Cooperation ==
Since the start of its cooperation with Pakistan in 1976, the European Commission has committed more than €1.300 million to projects and programmes. During the 1980s the commission launched a mix of infrastructure and social development projects which focused on development of roads, bridges, a fishing harbour facility, rural electricity infrastructure, livestock, education, vocational training and integrated rural development. In the 1990s the European Commission streamlined and consolidated its portfolio and reoriented its activities towards policy-based social sector investment programmes, placing greater emphasis on human development and environmental management in line with shifts in government policy. In addition, the European Commission provided support to smaller-scale operations with NGOs in areas such as population welfare, child labour, income generation, drug demand reduction and rural health.

Under the previous European Commission's Country Strategy Paper (CSP) 2002–2006, the European Union cooperation in Pakistan focused on human development, in particular basic education programmes at provincial level. For the period 2002-2006 €75 million were originally allocated for development and economic cooperation. Additional European Commission support to Pakistan was provided following the events of 2001 in recognition of Pakistan's role as a partner in the fight against terrorism, including €50 million for financial service reforms and to support development of micro-finance SMEs.

Under its environment cooperation policy, between 2001 and 2011 the European Union contributed a total of €30 million to rehabilitation, management and conservation of natural resources, safeguarding and conservation of biodiversity, education and capacity-building through sustainable resource management with the involvement of local communities. Major target areas included upland areas of Punjab and Khyber Pakhtunkhwa (KP), benefiting more than 2 million people. From 2011 to 2018, the EU launched 3 environment projects, with help from several stakeholders as WWF, with a total funding €2.659 million : the “Building Capacity on Climate Change Adaptation in Coastal Areas of Pakistan” (CCAP), “Strengthening Pakistan Civil Society Coalition for Climate Change (CSCCC)” and the “Strategic Environmental Assessment (SEA)/Environmental Impact Assessment (EIA) of the EU funded Rural Development Programmes in Pakistan”.

Pakistan is also part of the Horizon 2020 Programme, which is the biggest EU Research and Innovation programme ever of the European Union. The Pakistan Science Foundation has been declared as the Focal Organization for EU Research and Innovation Programme Horizon-2020 in Pakistan and, under the guidance and policy of the Ministry of Science and Technology will coordinate with the EU the implementation of the Horizon 2020 Programme.

Pakistan is also benefited from Erasmus+ which is an EU programme for education, training, youth and sport for the period 2014–2020. The programs funds academic mobility and gives the chances to a student to study in an abroad school/university. The Capacity Building in Higher Education action (CBHE) aimed to modernize and reforming higher education, improving governance and building relations between enterprises and higher education institutions.

The EU cooperation priorities with the Pakistan are defined in the Multi Annual Indicative Programme (MIP), for the period time 2014–2020, which are focus on delivering long-term support for Rural Development, Education and Governance. Through the MIP, the EU is contributing to rural development, education and training systems, humanitarian aid and has bolstered democracy in Pakistan.

One of the biggest EU funded programmes during this funding period (2015 – 2021) is the Sindh Union Council and Community Economic Strengthening Support (SUCCES). This project aims to enable the Government of Sindh to support and sustain development initiatives driven by the communities themselves in the province. Seeking for reducing poverty in 8 districts of the Sindh province, it will promote women's empowerment and help them to engage more efficiently with the local government. The SUCCESS Programme aim is to lead to increased levels and diversified sources of income for the targeted communities and households.

== Humanitarian Aid ==
The 8 October 2005 earthquake had a devastating effect on Northern Areas of Pakistan, in particular Azad Jammu and Kashmir and North West Frontier Province. In response to this calamity the Commission proposed an assistance package of €93.6 million, consisting of both humanitarian aid (€43.6 million) and reconstruction support (€50 million) for commitment in 2005. Substantial assistance was also provided under other thematic budget lines, including for Afghan refugees in Pakistan and droughts.

In 2010, Pakistan was affected by major floods and more than 20 million Pakistanis were affected by these floods. To help Pakistan, the European Union has funded €150 billion in 2010 and €92.5 billion in 2011 by the Directorate-General for European Civil Protection and Humanitarian Aid Operations (DG ECHO). Including floods, the EU also helped Pakistan for effected people as Internally Displaced Person (IDP) and refugees.

== Pakistan's foreign relations with EU member states ==
- Austria
- Belgium
- Bulgaria
- Croatia
- Cyprus
- Czech Republic
- Denmark
- Estonia
- Finland
- France
- Germany
- Greece
- Hungary
- (Republic of Ireland) Ireland
- Italy
- Latvia
- Lithuania
- Luxembourg
- Malta
- Netherlands
- Poland
- Portugal
- Romania
- Slovakia
- Slovenia
- Spain
- Sweden

== See also ==
- Foreign relations of the European Union
- Foreign relations of Pakistan
- Europeans in Pakistan
- Human rights in Pakistan
