= Russians in Pakistan =

Regions with significant populations
- Islamabad · Peshawar and FATA · Karachi

Languages
- Russian · Chechen · Urdu

Religion
- Russian Orthodox Church, Sunni Islam

Russians in Pakistan are a small expatriate community and consist entirely of students, employees, families and diplomats stationed inside the country. During the nine-year Soviet occupation of Afghanistan, Moscow had attempted to establish a commercial and industrial presence in Pakistan, by opening an Aeroflot office and setting up subsidiaries of steel and oil industries as well as a tractor factory. With only 56 Soviets in Pakistan in 1972, their numbers had suddenly jumped to 1,374 by 1980. In his book, the French political expert Roland Jacquard mentions that Pakistani authorities, who were already opposed to the Soviet presence in Afghanistan, became alarmed by the burgeoning increase of the population and entailed the Soviets to reduce their diplomatic presence in Islamabad by half. It has been alleged that during the time period, there was a strong presence of Soviet KGB agents in the country, who carried out spy work primarily from Peshawar and Islamabad in tandem with several hundred Afghan WAD agents, and monitored Pakistani aid to the Afghan mujahideen. According to Jacquard, one of the Soviet Union's objectives was to bring Pakistan under its sphere of influence and even when a sizeable number of Soviet diplomats were removed from operations in the country, there were approximately one-third who still worked for the KGB spy agency.

== Notable people ==
Pakistani people of Russian origin:

- Anna Molka Ahmed – artist and painter
- Nasreddin Murat-Khan – architect of the Minar-e-Pakistan monument, of Dagestani background

== See also ==
- Pakistan–Russia relations
- Russians in Afghanistan
- Russians in China
- Russians in India
- Russians in Iran
- Orthodoxy in Pakistan
- Pakistanis in Russia
