= Netherlands–Pakistan relations =

Bilateral relations

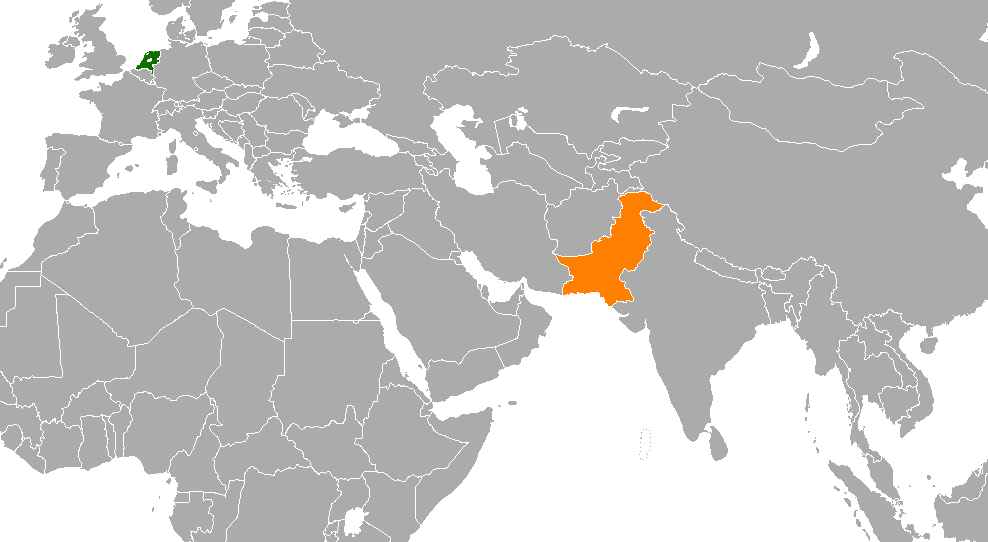
- Netherlands: Pakistan

The Netherlands–Pakistan relations (cultural phrase: Dutch-Pakistani relations) refers to the bilateral, economic, cultural and historical relations between the Netherlands and Pakistan. The Netherlands maintains a permanent embassy in Islamabad and honorary consulates in Karachi and Lahore. Pakistan has an embassy in The Hague.

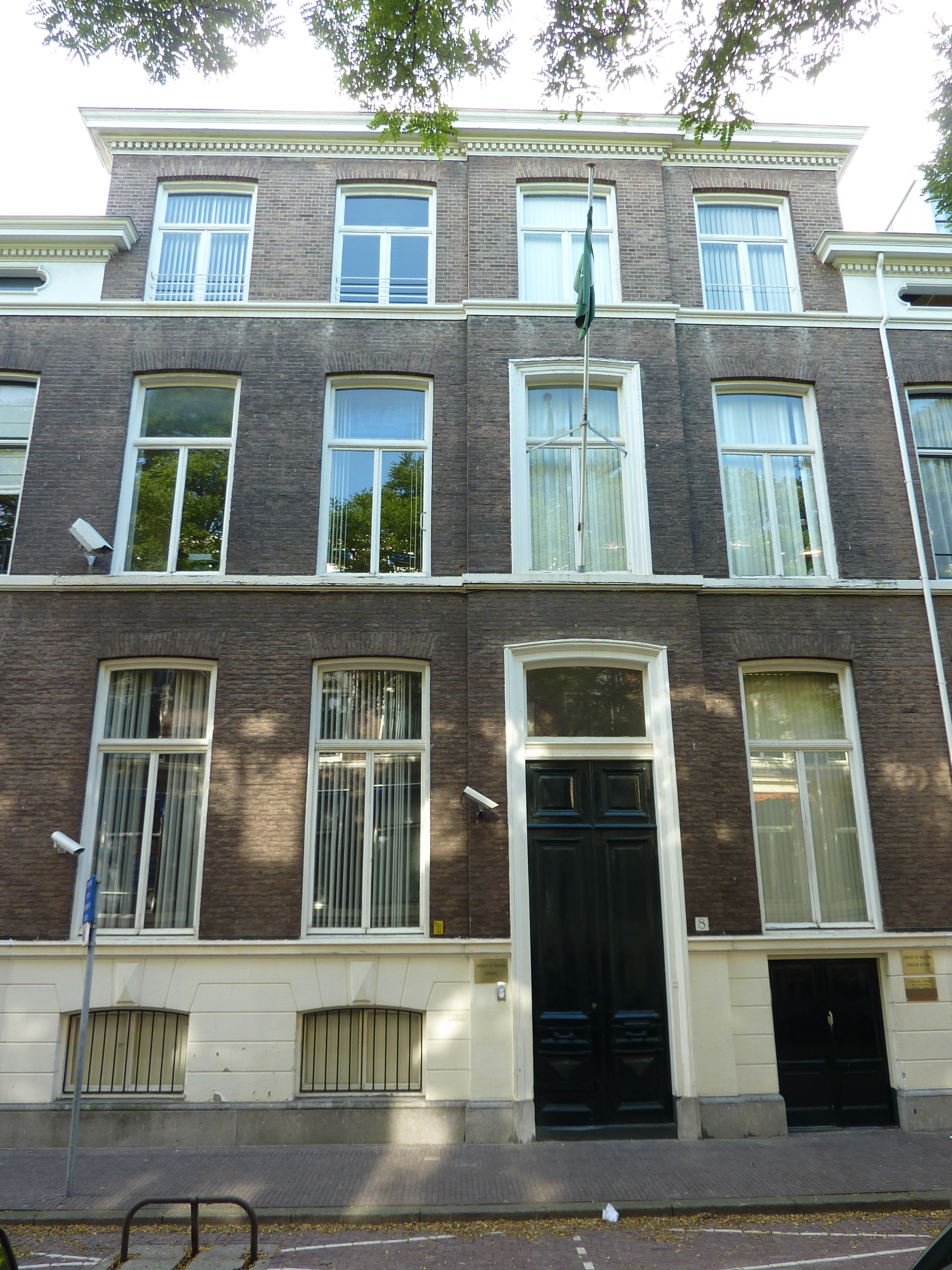
Pakistani embassy in The Hague, the Netherlands.

KLM were the first airline to fly to Karachi Airport 100 years ago.

== Diplomatic history ==
Pakistan and the Netherlands established bilateral relations soon after the independence of Pakistan. The Dutch Embassy opened in Karachi in 1955 and shifted to Islamabad ten years later. Pakistan soon became a partner country for the Netherlands, receiving substantial Development Cooperation funds from the 1960s onwards, in particular in the areas of water management/environment, education and governance. In 2011, the Dutch government decided to terminate the structural development projects and shift the focus to trade relations. Since 2004, the Netherlands has hosted more than 100 junior diplomats of Pakistan who were educated and obtained degrees from the Netherlands Institute of International Relations Clingendael.

=== Diplomatic Missions ===
The Netherlands maintains an embassy in Islamabad and two honorary consulates in the cities of Karachi and Lahore. Wouter Plomp is the current ambassador of Netherlands to Pakistan. Pakistan, on the other hand, operates an embassy in The Hague. Shujjat Ali Rathore is the ambassador of Pakistan to the Netherlands

Consulates of Pakistan and the Netherlands in their respective countries:

- Karachi— the consulate provides general services for Sindh and Balochistan Province.
- Lahore— the consulate provides general services for Punjab.

== Trade and economic relations ==
=== Historic Relations ===
Economic relations date back to the 17th century, when the Dutch East India Company established a small trading post in Thatta, Sindh. In March, 1652, Pieter de Bie sailed with his ship to Sindh and set up a trading post (factorij) in competition with the Portuguese and British. This trading post however lasted only eight years, as it was not a commercial success. Several trading missions followed, among which a well documented one in 1757, led by merchants Wolphert Abraham Brahe and Nicolaas Mahue. After this a long period of decline in economic relations set in. Just before World War II, the Royal Dutch Airlines KLM started to operate a hotel in Karachi, called Midway hotel, as this city was halfway between Amsterdam and Jakarta/Indonesia (the former Dutch colony). The hotel still exists as the Ramada Plaza Karachi Airport Hotel.

=== Post Independence ===
In 1948, Philips set up operations in Karachi, which subsequently developed into a manufacturing unit. Around the same time Unilever opened a company representative branch in Pakistan (Unilever Pakistan) followed by Royal Shell Pakistan. In 1982, Pakistan and the Netherlands signed a bilateral Double Taxation Agreement, to promote business activities in both countries. Pakistan is the 6th largest non-European economic partner and 13th largest economic partner trading partner of the Netherlands in the world.

== Resident diplomatic missions ==
- the Netherlands has an embassy in Islamabad.
- Pakistan has an embassy in The Hague.

== See also ==
- Foreign relations of the Netherlands
- Foreign relations of Pakistan
- Pakistan–EU relations
- Pakistanis in the Netherlands
