= Inam-ul-Haq (diplomat) =

Pakistani diplomat

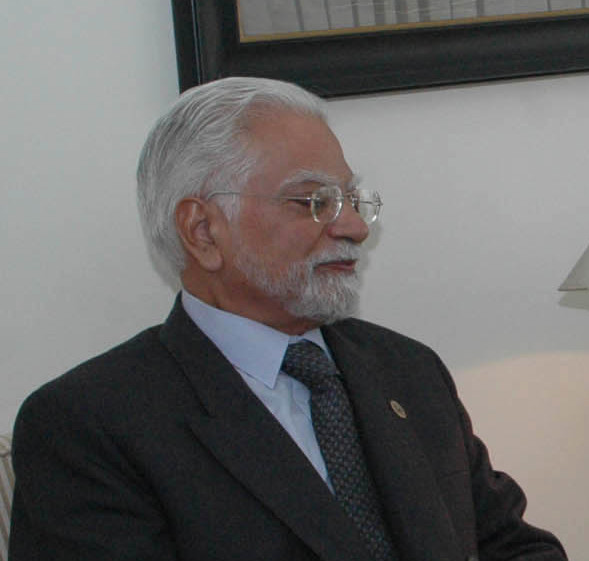

Minister of Foreign Affairs (caretaker)
- In office 16 November 2007 – 24 March 2008
- President: Pervez Musharraf
- Prime Minister: Muhammad Mian Soomro
- Preceded by: Khurshid Mahmud Kasuri
- Succeeded by: Shah Mehmood Qureshi

Minister of State for Foreign Affairs
- In office 21 June 2002 – 23 November 2002
- President: Pervez Musharraf
- Preceded by: Abdul Sattar
- Succeeded by: Khurshid Mahmud Kasuri

Foreign Secretary of Pakistan
- In office 17 February 2000 – 21 June 2002
- Preceded by: Shamshad Ahmad
- Succeeded by: Riaz Khokhar

Permanent Representative of Pakistan to the United Nations
- In office August 1999 – February 2000
- Preceded by: Ahmad Kamal
- Succeeded by: Shamshad Ahmad

Personal details
- Born: 10 November 1940 (age 85)

Inam-ul-Haq (Urdu: انعام الحق; born 10 November 1940) is a Pakistani career diplomat who served as the Foreign Minister of Pakistan in the caretaker government of Muhammad Mian Soomro for four months from November 2007 till March 2008.

He also remained Minister of State for Foreign Affairs from June 2002 till the appointment of Khurshid Mahmud Kasuri as Foreign Minister in November 2002, and Foreign Secretary, the highest post of Ministry of Foreign Affairs, after he replaced Shamshad Ahmad in February 2000.

Haq served as Pakistan Ambassador to Turkey, China (1997–1999) and Permanent Representative to the United Nations before being appointed Foreign Secretary.

As of January 2026, Haq is the Chairman of the Board of the Islamabad Policy Research Institute, a quasi-governmental think-tank based in Islamabad.

== Career ==
Inam-ul-Haq was the Chairman, Board of Governors at Institute of Strategic Studies, a leading strategic studies think tank in Islamabad funded by Pakistan Foreign Office. He also held the position of Chairman at Pakistan-China Friendship Forum. Inam-ul-Haq was the member, Board of Governors at Institute of Regional Studies, Islamabad. Being a seasoned diplomat, he was the Distinguished Visiting Fellow at the premier military academy, the National Defence University Pakistan. He frequently delivers lectures at the National Security Workshops.

Before joining the Foreign Service of Pakistan in November 1965, Inam-ul-Haq taught English language and literature from 1961–65. From November 1965 to September 1966, after completion of pre-service training of civil servants at Civil Services Academy Lahore, his first professional assignment with the government of Pakistan was as section officer at the Ministry of Foreign Affairs (Pakistan), from September 1966 to January 1968. Viewing his capabilities and fortitude, Inam-ul-Haq was designated as Third Secretary with the Permanent Representative of Pakistan to the United Nations, New York from January 1968 to May 1969. Later, the same year, he was posted to Lagos, Nigeria where he served as Second Secretary to the Embassy of Pakistan till July 1971. After completion of his assignment in Nigeria, Inam-ul-haq was posted to Lisbon, Portugal in July 1971 as the Charge d’ Affaires to the Embassy of Pakistan. In August 1974, Inam-ul-Haq was sent to Kingdom of Saudi Arabia as the first Secretary to the Embassy of Pakistan where he served till October 1976.

With his growing experience as a diplomat, in October 1976 the foreign office designated him the responsibility of Counsellor at the Permanent Mission of Pakistan to United Nations, New York. He held the duty with full vigour and sense of professionalism and served the mission till February 1979. For the next 6 years, Inam-ul-Haq served as the Director and subsequently, the Director-General at the Ministry of Foreign Affairs, in charge of UN and its affiliated organizations as well as all other multilateral organizations i.e. Non-Aligned Movement, Organisation of Islamic Cooperation (OIC) etc.

In February 1985, he was sent as Advisor and Chef du Cabinet to the Secretary General of the Organization of Islamic Conference Jeddah, Kingdom of Saudi Arabia where the OIC benefitted from his expertise till November 1988. The same month, he was called back to Pakistan for more pressing responsibilities as Additional Foreign Secretary, in charge of Multilateral Affairs, Africa, Soviet Union and Eastern Europe and Asia-Pacific. Accredited of his persuasive communication skills, he was given the responsibility of being the Official Spokesman of the Government of Pakistan on Foreign Affairs.

In February 1992 he was posted in Ankara as the Ambassador of Pakistan to the Republic of Turkey where he served till November 1996. In November 1996, he became the Special Secretary at the Ministry of Foreign Affairs, Islamabad. He held the position till March 1997 when he was assigned the task of ambassadorship of Pakistan to the People's Republic of China. Inam-ul-Haq served in Beijing till June, 1999.

Due to his excellent advocacy and negotiation skills, he was given the charge of Permanent Representative of Pakistan to the United Nations, from July 1999 till February 2000 in New York. After completion of his duties at New York, he returned to Pakistan as Foreign Secretary and served from February 2000 to June 2002. While serving in this capacity, Inam-ul-Haq’s performance drew the attention of President General Pervez Musharraf who requested he join the cabinet, making him the Minister of State for Foreign Affairs of Pakistan from June to November 2002.

== Personal life ==
Inam-ul-Haq was married to senior Pakistani diplomat and ambassador Seema Naqvi until her death in 2014.

Diplomatic posts
Preceded by Ashraf Qazi	Pakistan Ambassador to China; 1997–1999	Succeeded by Riaz Khokhar
Preceded by Ahmad Kamal	Pakistan Ambassador to the United Nations; 1999–2000	Succeeded by Shamshad Ahmad
Preceded by Shamshad Ahmad	Foreign Secretary of Pakistan; 2000–2002	Succeeded by Riaz Khokhar
Political offices
Preceded by Siddiq Khan Kanju	Minister of State for Foreign Affairs; 2002	Succeeded by Makhdoom Khusro Bakhtiar
Preceded by Khurshid Mahmud Kasuri	Foreign Minister of Pakistan; 2007–2008	Succeeded by Shah Mehmood Qureshi
