= Amna Baloch =

Pakistani diplomat

Her Excellency Amna Baloch
- آمنہ بلوچ

33rd Foreign Secretary of Pakistan
- In office 11 September 2024 – 17 September 2026
- President: Asif Ali Zardari
- Prime Minister: Shehbaz Sharif
- Preceded by: Syrus Sajjad Qazi
- Succeeded by: Asim Iftikhar Ahmad

Ambassador of Pakistan to the European Union, Belgium and Luxembourg
- In office 2023–2024
- President: Arif Alvi; Asif Ali Zardari
- Prime Minister: Anwar-ul-Haq Kakar; Shehbaz Sharif
- Preceded by: Asad Majeed Khan
- Succeeded by: Zaheer Janjua

Ambassador of Pakistan to Malaysia
- In office 2019–2023
- President: Arif Alvi
- Prime Minister: Imran Khan; Shehbaz Sharif; Anwar-ul-Haq Kakar
- Preceded by: Nafees Zakaria
- Succeeded by: Syed Ahsan Raza Shah

Personal details
- Born: 1966 (age 59–60)
- Spouse: Zulfiqar Ali Khan
- Relations: Nabi Bakhsh Baloch (father)
- Children: 2
- Education: Quaid-i-Azam University (B.A.); Nanyang Technological University (MBA)
- Occupation: Foreign Service of Pakistan
- Profession: Diplomat

Amna Baloch (born 1966) is a Pakistani diplomat who has served as the 33rd Foreign Secretary of Pakistan from 2024 to 2026. A retired member of the Foreign Service of Pakistan, she previously served as the Ambassador of Pakistan to the EU, Belgium and Luxembourg.

== Early life and education ==
Amna Baloch was born in 1966. Her father was scholar Nabi Bakhsh Baloch. She earned a master's degree in history from Quaid-i-Azam University and an MBA from Nanyang Technological University, Singapore.

== Diplomatic career ==
Baloch joined the Foreign Service in 1991. She served as a selection officer in the Ministry of Foreign Affairs from 1992 to 1994 and again from 1998 to 2002. Baloch served as a Second Secretary in the Embassy of Pakistan in Copenhagen from 2001 to 2003 before returning to Islamabad. She served as a deputy director in the ministry between 2004 and 2005 before becoming a Director, a role she served in from 2005 to 2010. During her time in the Ministry's Headquarters, she served in political, administrative, and protocol divisions. Baloch served as a Minister in the Embassy of Pakistan in Colombo from 2011 to 2014 before being appointed as the Consul General of Pakistan to Chengdu, a role she served in from 2014 to 2017. Upon returning to Islamabad, she went on deputation to the Prime Minister's Office and served as a Joint Secretary from February 2018 to August 2018 before becoming the Addition Secretary in the Foreign Minister's Office from September 2018 to June 2019. Baloch was appointed as the Ambassador of Pakistan to Malaysia and served in the role from 2019 until 2023. She later served as the Ambassador of Pakistan to the EU, Belgium and Luxembourg from 2023 until 2024. After completing her diplomatic assignment and returning to Pakistan, she was appointed the Foreign Secretary of Pakistan to replace the outgoing Syrus Qazi. She became the second female Foreign Secretary after Tehmina Janjua. Amna Baloch retired as Foreign Secretary on 17 September, 2026. She was succeeded by Asim Iftikhar Ahmad.

== Personal life ==
Amna Baloch is married to Zulfiqar Ali Khan and has two daughters.
