= Syed Haider Shah =

Diplomat

His Excellency Syed Haider Shah
- سید حیدر شاہ

23rd Permanent Representative of Pakistan to the United Nations
- Incumbent
- Assumed office 03 November 2026
- President: Asif Ali Zardari
- Prime Minister: Shehbaz Sharif
- Preceded by: Asim Iftikhar Ahmad

23rd Ambassador of Pakistan to the Netherlands
- In office March 2025 – October 2026
- President: Asif Ali Zardari
- Prime Minister: Shehbaz Sharif
- Preceded by: Suljuk Mustansar Tarar
- Succeeded by: TBD

15th Ambassador of Pakistan to Nepal
- In office November 2020 – October 2022
- President: Arif Alvi
- Prime Minister: Imran Khan; Shehbaz Sharif
- Preceded by: Mazhar Javed
- Succeeded by: Abrar H. Hashmi

Personal details
- Children: 3
- Education: Government College Rawalpindi (BA); Khyber Law College (LL.B); Harvard Law School (LL.M)

Syed Haider Shah is a Pakistani diplomat who has served as the 23rd Permanent Representative of Pakistan to the United Nations since November 2026. A member of the Foreign Service of Pakistan, he previously served as Ambassador of Pakistan to the Netherlands from 2025 to 2026 and Ambassador of Pakistan to Nepal from 2020 to 2022.

== Early life and education ==
Syed Haider Shah was born into a military family and grew up across different parts of Pakistan. He completed his matriculation in Quetta and his F.Sc in Murree. Shah earned his bachelor's degree from Government College Rawalpindi and earned an LL.B from Khyber Law College in 1993. Syed Haider Shah later attended Harvard Law School, from where he earned an LL.M in 1998. He also earned a postgraduate diploma in International Law from the International Institute of Social Studies of Erasmus University in 2000.

== Career ==
Syed Haider Shah joined the Foreign Service of Pakistan in 1995. From 1998 to 2002, Shah served as a Section Officer in the Ministry of Foreign Affairs in Islamabad. He dealt with the United Nations, Afghanistan, and South Asia. During this time, Shah also served as a Staff Officer to the Foreign Secretary and Foreign Minister of Pakistan.

From 2002 to 2006, Syed Haider Shah served in the Permanent Mission of Pakistan to the United Nations in New York, covering the Sixth Committee of the UN General Assembly. Throughout this period, he participated in the negotiations of numerous Security Council and General Assembly resolutions.

Upon returning to headquarters, Shah was appointed as Director (United Nations), a role he served in from 2006 to 2008. From 2008 to 2013, he served as a Legal Officer in the United Nations Counter-Terrorism Committee Executive Directorate (CTED) in New York.

Syed Haider Shah was appointed as Director (Afghanistan) from July 2013 to April 2014 upon returning to headquarters. From July 2014 to August 2015, he served as Director (Foreign Minister's Office).

In 2016, Shah was posted as Deputy High Commissioner of Pakistan to India. During his time in India, he served as the Chargé d'affaires (Acting High Commissioner) from April 2019 until October 2020, when his posting in India came to an end.

=== Ambassador of Pakistan to Nepal (2020-2022) ===
In November 2020, Syed Haider Shah assumed the role of Ambassador of Pakistan to Nepal, succeeding Ambassador Mazhar Javed . He presented his Letter of credence to President Bidya Devi Bhandari in a ceremony at Shital Niwas on 15 February, 2021. Shah served as Ambassador to Nepal until October 2022 and paid a farewell call on President Bidya Devi Bhandari.

=== Additional Foreign Secretary (2022-2025) ===
Upon completing his diplomatic assignment in Nepal, Shah assumed the role of Additional Foreign Secretary (United Nations & Organisation of Islamic Cooperation) at headquarters from November 2022 until February 2025. During this time, he participated in the seventy-eighth (2023-24) and seventy-ninth sessions of the United Nations General Assembly (2024-2025).

=== Ambassador of Pakistan to the Netherlands (2025-2026) ===
In March 2025, Syed Haider Shah succeeded Suljuk Mustansar Tarar as Ambassador of Pakistan to the Netherlands. He presented his Letter of credence to King Willem-Alexander of the Netherlands on 26 March 2025. Alongside his responsibilities as Ambassador to the Netherlands, Shah was concurrently accredited as Permanent Representative of Pakistan to the Organisation for the Prohibition of Chemical Weapons. His diplomatic assignment came to an end in October 2026.

=== Permanent Representative of Pakistan to the United Nations (2026-present) ===
In October 2026, Prime Minister Shehbaz Sharif appointed Syed Haider Shah to succeed Asim Iftikhar Ahmad as Permanent Representative of Pakistan to the United Nations. He presented his credentials to UN Secretary-General António Guterres at the UN Headquarters in New York on November 3, 2026, which officially marked the beginning of his duties.

== Personal life ==
Syed Haider Shah is married and has three children.
