= Asim Iftikhar Ahmad =

Pakistani diplomat and UN Permanent Representative

His Excellency Asim Iftikhar Ahmad
- عاصم افتخار احمد

34th Foreign Secretary of Pakistan
- Incumbent
- Assumed office 12 October 2026
- President: Asif Ali Zardari
- Prime Minister: Shehbaz Sharif
- Preceded by: Amna Baloch

22nd Permanent Representative of Pakistan to the United Nations
- In office 1 April 2025 – 12 October 2026
- President: Asif Ali Zardari
- Prime Minister: Shehbaz Sharif
- Preceded by: Munir Akram
- Succeeded by: Syed Haider Shah

Ambassador of Pakistan to France
- In office November 2022 – December 2024
- President: Arif Alvi; Asif Ali Zardari
- Prime Minister: Shehbaz Sharif; Anwaar ul Haq Kakar; Shehbaz Sharif
- Preceded by: Moin ul Haque
- Succeeded by: Mumtaz Zahra Baloch

Ambassador of Pakistan to Thailand
- In office June 2017 – July 2021
- President: Mamnoon Hussain; Arif Alvi
- Prime Minister: Nawaz Sharif; Shahid Khaqan Abbasi; Nasirul Mulk; Imran Khan
- Preceded by: Sohail Khan
- Succeeded by: Sahebzada A. Khan

Personal details
- Born: 27 November 1966 (age 59) Lahore, Punjab
- Education: UET Lahore; University of the Punjab
- Occupation: Diplomat

Asim Iftikhar Ahmad (born 27 November 1966) is a Pakistani diplomat who is the Foreign Secretary of Pakistan. A member of the Foreign Service of Pakistan, he previously served as the Ambassador of Pakistan to the United Nations, France (2022–2024) and Thailand (2017–2021), and as the spokesperson for the Ministry of Foreign Affairs.

== Career ==
On 9 September 2026, the Deputy Prime Minister and Foreign Minister of Pakistan Ishaq Dar announced that Asim Iftikhar Ahmad will succeed Amna Baloch as the 34th Foreign Secretary of Pakistan.

Asim Iftikhar Ahmad formally assumed charge as Foreign Secretary of Pakistan on 12 October, 2026.
