= Aizaz Ahmad Chaudhry =

Pakistani diplomat

Ambassador Aizaz Ahmad Chaudhry
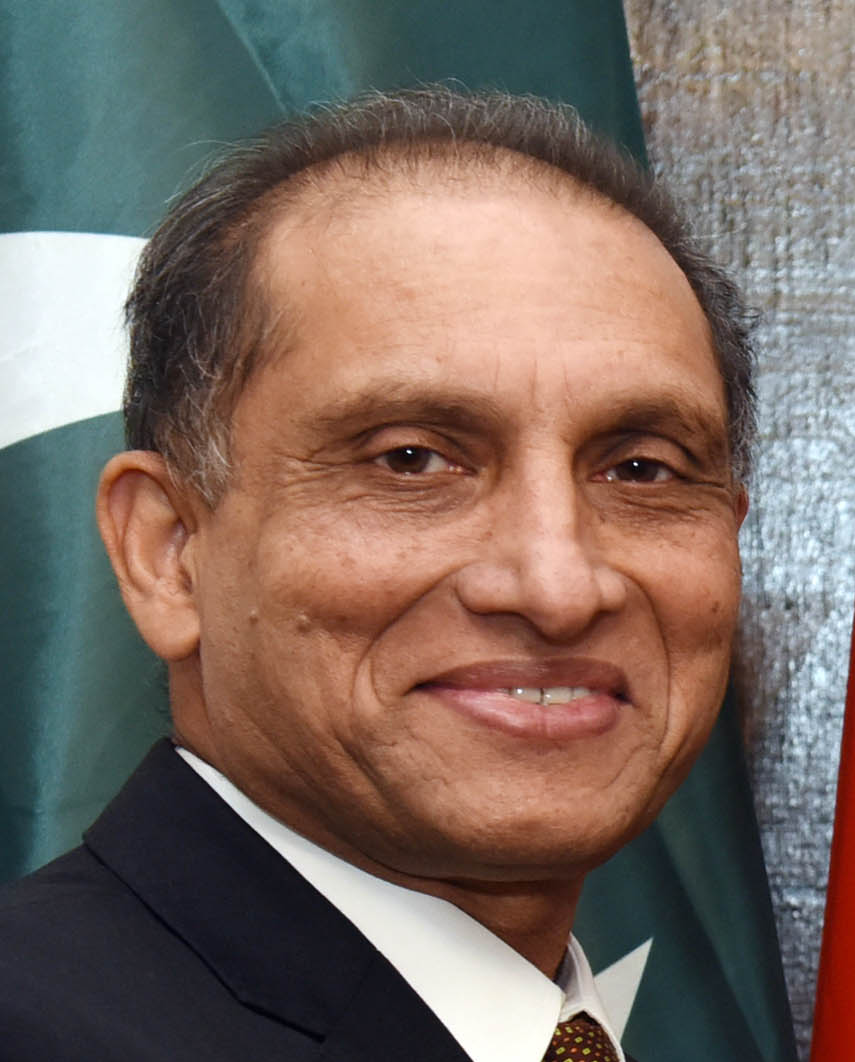

Ambassador of Pakistan to the United States
- In office March 2017 – May 2018
- Nominated by: Nawaz Sharif
- Preceded by: Jalil Abbas Jilani
- Succeeded by: Ali Jehangir Siddiqui

28th Foreign Secretary of Pakistan
- In office 18 December 2013 – February 2017
- Prime Minister: Nawaz Sharif
- Preceded by: Jalil Abbas Jilani
- Succeeded by: Tehmina Janjua

Personal details
- Born: 27 February 1958 (age 68)
- Education: Fletcher School of Law and Diplomacy, University of the Punjab, PAF Public School Sargodha

Aizaz Ahmad Chaudhry (born 27 February 1958) is a Pakistani diplomat and director general of Institute of Strategic Studies Islamabad. He served as the ambassador of Pakistan to the United States and was succeeded by Ali Jehangir Siddiqui. Previously, he served as the foreign secretary of Pakistan, as the Pakistan's ambassador to the Netherlands and the spokesperson of the Foreign Office.

== Early life and education ==
Chaudhry was born on 27 February 1958.

A graduate of PAF College Sargodha, Chaudhry holds a BS from University of the Punjab and M.A. in International Relations from the Fletcher School of Law and Diplomacy at the Tufts University.

Chaudhry was briefly diagnosed with cancer. He underwent treatment in the Netherlands, New York and Pakistan, and recovered in 2016.

Chaudhry is married, and has three children.

== Career ==
Choudhry joined the Foreign Service of Pakistan in 1980. During his 34 years service, he worked on various assignments at home and abroad.

He remained Ambassador of Pakistan to the Netherlands from 2009 to 2012.

His other assignments are:

- Represented Pakistan in the United Nations for over six years.
- As Pakistan's deputy permanent representative to the UN in New York.
- Served as political counsellor in Embassy of Pakistan, Washington, D.C. (1999–2000).
- Served as third/second secretary Pakistan Embassy in Doha (1984–87).
- Served as additional foreign secretary of UN and disarmament affairs.
- Served as the director general of relations with South Asian countries.

He served as the spokesperson of the foreign ministry of Pakistan from March 2013 until December 2013.

In December 2013, while he was working as the acting foreign secretary, he was promoted to Grade 22. He served as the foreign secretary of Pakistan from 18 December 2013 until February 2017.

In February 2017, he was appointed the ambassador of Pakistan to the United States.

== Books ==
- Pakistan Mirrored to Dutch Eyes (ISBN 9789693525281) published by Sang-e-Meel Publications.
- Diplomatic Footprints: A Memoir (ISBN 9789693533682) published by Sang-e-Meel Publications.
- Headwinds and Horizons: Pakistan and the Evolving World Order (ISBN 9789693716320) published by National Book Foundation.
