= Ahmad Kamal =

Pakistani diplomat (1938–2023)

Ahmed Kamal
- احمد کمال

Pakistan Ambassador to the United Nations
- In office March 1995 – August 1999
- Preceded by: Jamsheed Marker
- Succeeded by: Inam-ul-Haq

Pakistan Ambassador to the United Nations
- In office March 1989 – March 1995
- Preceded by: Mansur Ahmed
- Succeeded by: Munir Akram

Personal details
- Born: April 9, 1938
- Died: May 25, 2023 (aged 85) New York
- Education: Paris Institute of Political Studies, Fletcher School of Law and Diplomacy at Tufts University, London School of Economics
- Occupation: Diplomat
- Known for: Work at the United Nations
- Awards: Tamgha-e-Pakistan (1971), Gwanghwa Medal (1987), Medal of Honour, Kyonghi University (1987), Honorary Doctorate in Public Administration, Myongji University (1987)

Ahmed Kamal (Urdu: احمد کمال; 9 April 1938 – 25 May 2023) was a Pakistani diplomat, most noted for his work at the United Nations. He served as a professional diplomat in the Ministry of Foreign Affairs of Pakistan for close to forty years until his retirement in 1999.

== Education ==
Ahmed Kamal was a graduate of the Paris Institute of Political Studies (better known as Sciences Po) and the Fletcher School of Law and Diplomacy at Tufts University. He was also a Carnegie Foundation Fellow at the London School of Economics. He authored several important publications on disarmament, management, multilateralism, global economic issues, and the technical aspects of informatics and information technology. He was an honorary visiting professor at several universities in the United States, and a member of the board of trustees of Fairleigh Dickinson University. He received numerous honors in Pakistan and in the other countries of his postings.

== Career ==
During his nearly 40 year long career, Kamal held diplomatic postings in India, Belgium, France, the Soviet Union, Saudi Arabia, the Republic of Korea, and with the United Nations both in Geneva and in New York City.

During his decade-long assignment as ambassador and permanent representative of Pakistan to the United Nations, he held many of the highest elective posts, such as vice president of the General Assembly, president of the Economic and Social Council, chairman of the Consultations on the Role of NGOs at the United Nations, chairman of the Working Group on Informatics, chairman of the board of trustees of the United Nations Institute of Training and Research, and member of the United Nations Advisory Committee on Administrative and Budgetary Questions. He was the chief negotiator of Pakistan in the Uruguay Round negotiations which led to the establishment of the World Trade Organization. He had been a senior fellow of the United Nations Institute of Training and Research, and was the founding president and chief executive officer of the Ambassador's Club at the United Nations.

== Death ==
Kamal died in New York on 25 May 2023, at age 85.

== Awards and recognition ==
- Tamgha-e-Pakistan (Pakistan Medal) by the Government of Pakistan in 1971
- Gwanghwa Medal, (Order of Diplomatic Service Merit), Government of the Republic of Korea in 1987
- Medal of Honour, Kyonghi University, Republic of Korea in 1987
- Honorary Doctorate in Public Administration, Myongji University, Republic of Korea in 1987

Diplomatic posts
Preceded by Jamsheed Marker	Pakistan Ambassador to the United Nations in New York; March 1995 – August 1999	Succeeded by Inam-ul-Haq
Preceded by Mansur Ahmed	Pakistan Ambassador to the United Nations in Geneva; March 1989 – March 1995	Succeeded by Munir Akram
