= Sardar Shah Nawaz =

Pakistani diplomat (c. 1917-1991

9th Permanent Representative of Pakistan to the United Nations
- In office 1982–1989
- Preceded by: Niaz Naik
- Succeeded by: Jamsheed Marker

14th Foreign Secretary
- In office 7 June 1977 – 29 May 1980
- Preceded by: Agha Shahi
- Succeeded by: Riaz Piracha

Ambassador of Pakistan to Iran
- In office 1968–1972

Personal details
- Born: c. 1917
- Died: 11 January 1991 (aged 73–74) New York, US
- Spouse: Begum Maliha Shah Nawaz

Sardar Shah Nawaz (c. 1917 – 11 January 1991; also known as S. Shahnawaz, was a Pakistani diplomat who served as the 14th foreign secretary of Pakistan from 1977 to 1980, and 9th permanent representative of Pakistan to the United Nations from 1982 to 1989.

He started his career when he joined the civil services of Pakistan in 1950. Prior to his appointment at the UN and foreign ministry, he served as ambassador of Pakistan to Iran from 1968 to 1972. He was later appointed secretary-general of the Ministry of Foreign Affairs from 1980 to 1982.

He was suffering from cancer and was admitted to a hospital in New York on 11 January 1991. He died on the same day in hospital.
