= Maleeha Lodhi =

Pakistani diplomat and political scientist

Maleeha Lodhi HI
- مليحه لودھى
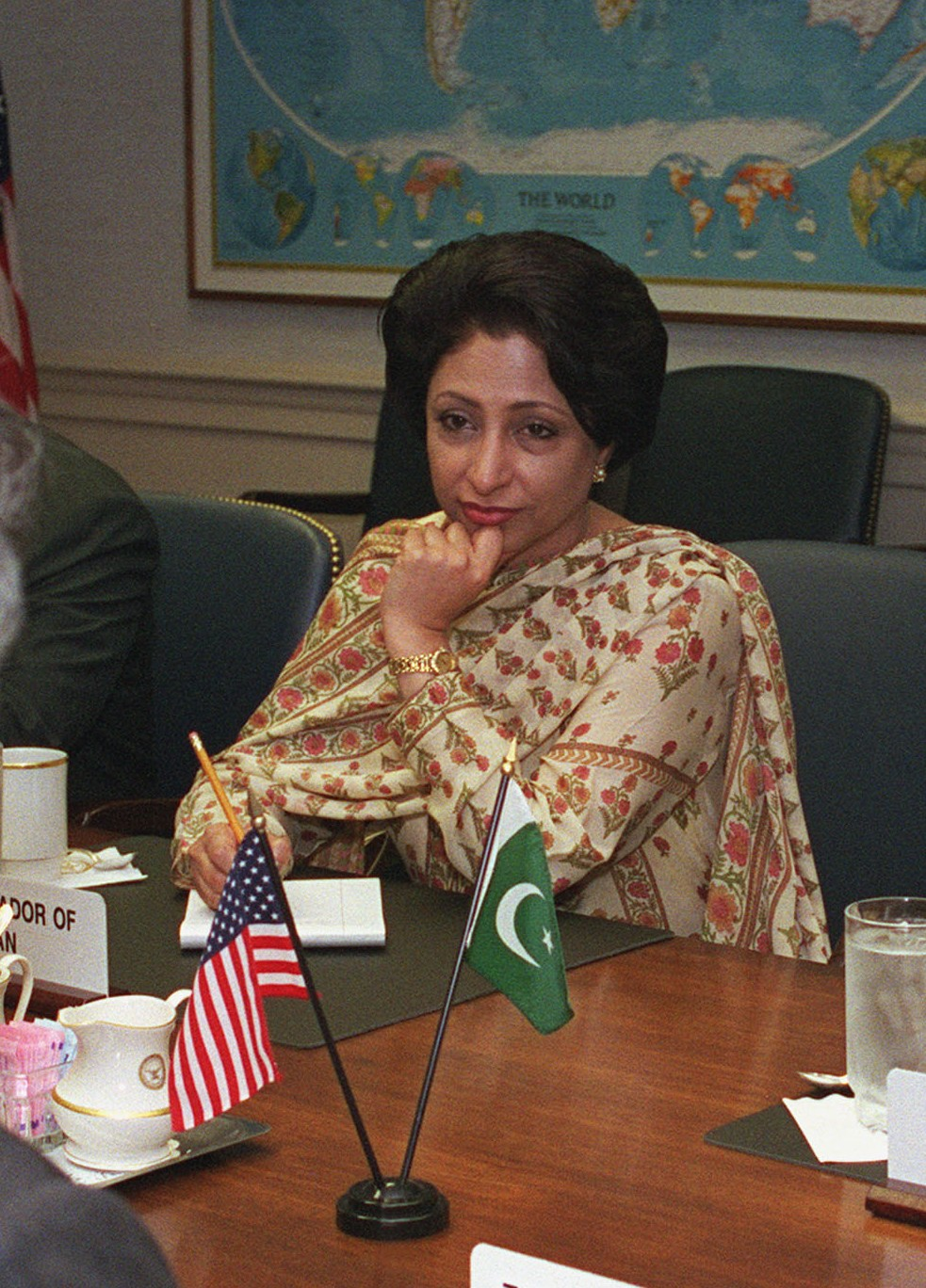
- Lodhi at the Pakistan-US talks in 2001

Permanent Representative of Pakistan to the United Nations
- In office 6 February 2015 – 30 October 2019
- President: Mamnoon Hussain; Arif Alvi
- Prime Minister: Nawaz Sharif; Shahid Khaqan Abbasi; Nasirul Mulk (Caretaker); Imran Khan
- Preceded by: Masood Khan
- Succeeded by: Munir Akram

17th Pakistan Ambassador to the United States
- In office 17 December 1999 – 4 August 2002
- President: Pervez Musharraf; Muhammad Rafiq Tarar
- Preceded by: Riaz Khokhar
- Succeeded by: Ashraf Qazi
- In office 21 January 1994 – 30 January 1997
- President: Farooq Leghari
- Prime Minister: Nawaz Sharif
- Preceded by: Syeda Abida Hussain
- Succeeded by: Riaz Khokhar

High Commissioner of Pakistan to the United Kingdom
- In office 1 April 2003 – 14 June 2008
- President: Pervez Musharraf
- Prime Minister: Zafarullah Khan Jamali; Chaudhry Shujaat Hussain; Shaukat Aziz
- Preceded by: Abdul Kader Jaffer
- Succeeded by: Wajid Shamsul Hasan

Personal details
- Born: 15 November 1962 (age 63) Lahore, Punjab, Pakistan
- Education: London School of Economics
- Occupation: Diplomat, strategist, academician
- Awards: Hilal-e-Imtiaz (2002)

Maleeha Lodhi (Urdu: مليحه لودهى; born 15 November 1952) is a Pakistani diplomat, political scientist, and a former Pakistan's Permanent Representative to the United Nations. She was the first woman to hold the position. Previously, she served as Pakistan's envoy to the Court of St James' and twice as its ambassador to the United States.

Born in Lahore to an upper-middle-class family, Lodhi studied political science at the London School of Economics and after receiving her doctorate from the school in 1980, she remained there as a member of the Department of Government teaching political sociology. She returned to Pakistan in 1986 to become the editor of The Muslim, making her the first woman to edit a national newspaper in Asia. In 1990, she moved to become the founding editor of The News International. In 1994, she was appointed by Prime Minister Nawaz Sharif as Pakistan's envoy to the United States, a position she retained until 1997. She was once again appointed to the same position in 1999 by President Musharraf until 2002 when she completed her tenure and moved on to be High Commissioner to the UK.

In 2001, Lodhi became a member of the United Nations Secretary General's Advisory Board on Disarmament, she served on the board until 2005. In 2003, President Musharraf appointed her as Pakistan's High Commissioner to the United Kingdom at the Court of St James's, where she remained until 2008. Between 2008 and 2010, she served as a resident fellow at the Institute of Politics and the Kennedy School of Harvard University. In February 2015, Lodhi was introduced by Prime Minister Sharif to serve as Permanent Representative and Ambassador of Pakistan to the UN in New York City, making her the first woman to hold the position.

Lodhi is one of Pakistan's prominent diplomats. She has been named as an international scholar at the Woodrow Wilson Center and, in 1994, Lodhi was named by Time magazine as one of a hundred people in the world who will help to shape the 21st century. Lodhi was also a member of the National Defence University's Senate, and has been a member of the advisory council of IISS and continues to be a member of the Global Agenda Council of the World Economic Forum. Lodhi is the recipient of the Hilal-i-Imtiaz for Public Service and holds an honorary fellowship from the London School of Economics since 2004 and received an honorary degree of Doctor of Letters from the London Metropolitan University in 2005. She is the author of two books, Pakistan: The External Challenge and Pakistan's Encounter with Democracy. She edited Pakistan: Beyond the Crisis State in 2010.

== Early life and family ==
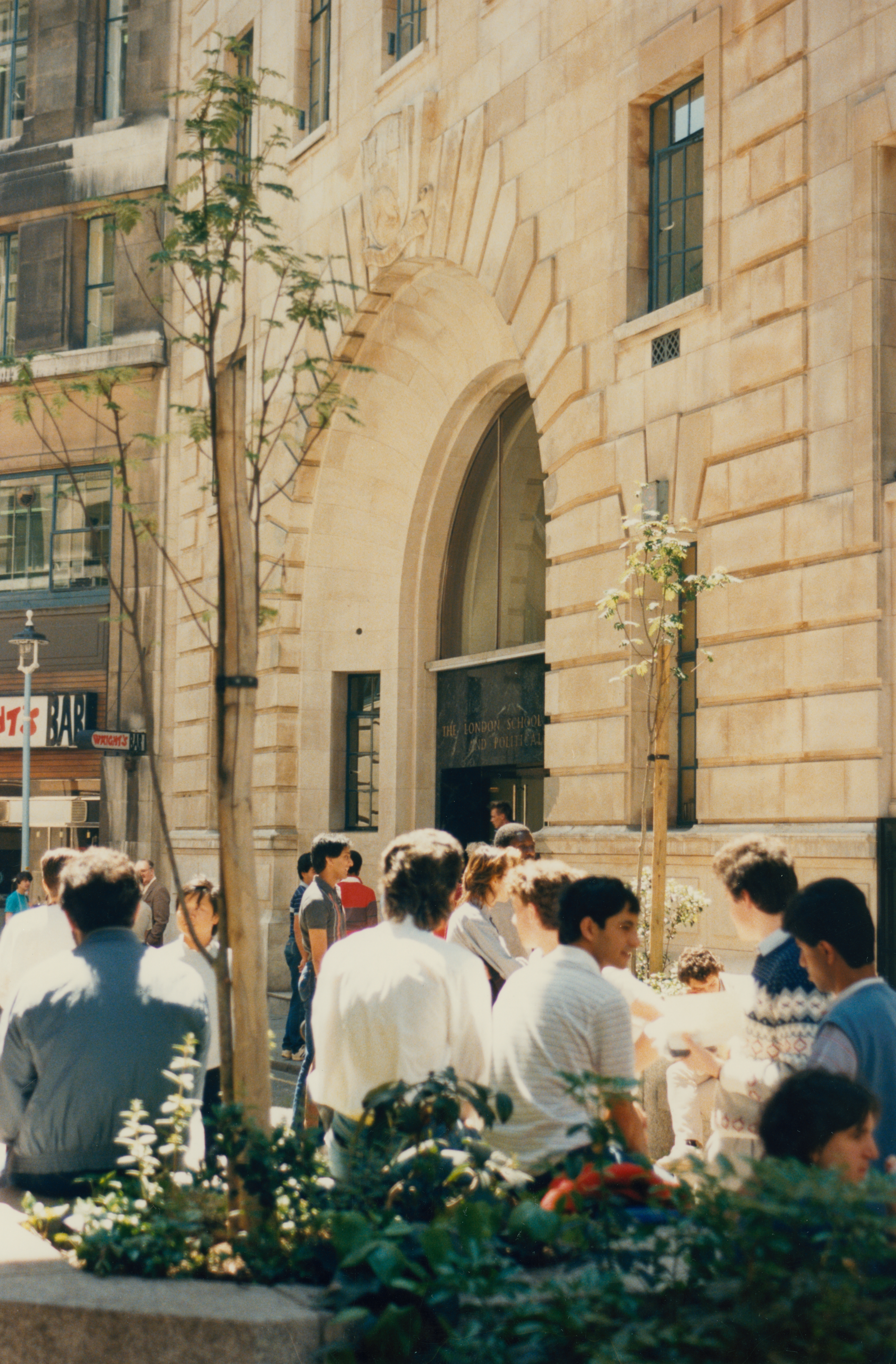
Entrance to Department of Government at London School of Economics, where Lodhi studied and later taught.

Lodhi was born in Lahore, Punjab, to an upper-middle-class family. Her father was the chief executive of a British-based oil company and was the first Pakistani head of a British company in Pakistan. Her mother received an MA in journalism and was offered a scholarship to study in the United States after graduating, but gave up a career in journalism to become a homemaker and look after her children. Lodhi has two siblings. Lodhi was married to a banker in London, but they divorced after five years of marriage; together, they have a son named Faisal.

Lodhi first received her school education in Lahore and Rawalpindi, and then in the United Kingdom. She attended the London School of Economics in 1972 to study economics. She received her BSc in Economics, specializing in political science in 1976, worked towards attaining PhD in political science, which she was awarded in 1980.

== Career ==
=== Academia and journalism ===
She taught for a short while at the Quaid-i-Azam University in Islamabad in 1980, but returned to London to teach at the London School of Economics's Department of Government where she taught courses in political sociology until 1985. Lodhi returned to Pakistan in 1986 after martial law had been lifted. Her phones were tapped and she was followed by intel sleuths all the time. She joined and edited the English language newspaper The Muslim in 1987, making her the first woman in Asia to edit a national daily newspaper. In 1990 she moved to become the founding editor of The News International where she remained until 1993 when she was appointed by Benazir Bhutto as the country's envoy to the United States. She re-joined The News International 1997 as its chief editor and remained until 1999.

=== Ambassador to the United States ===
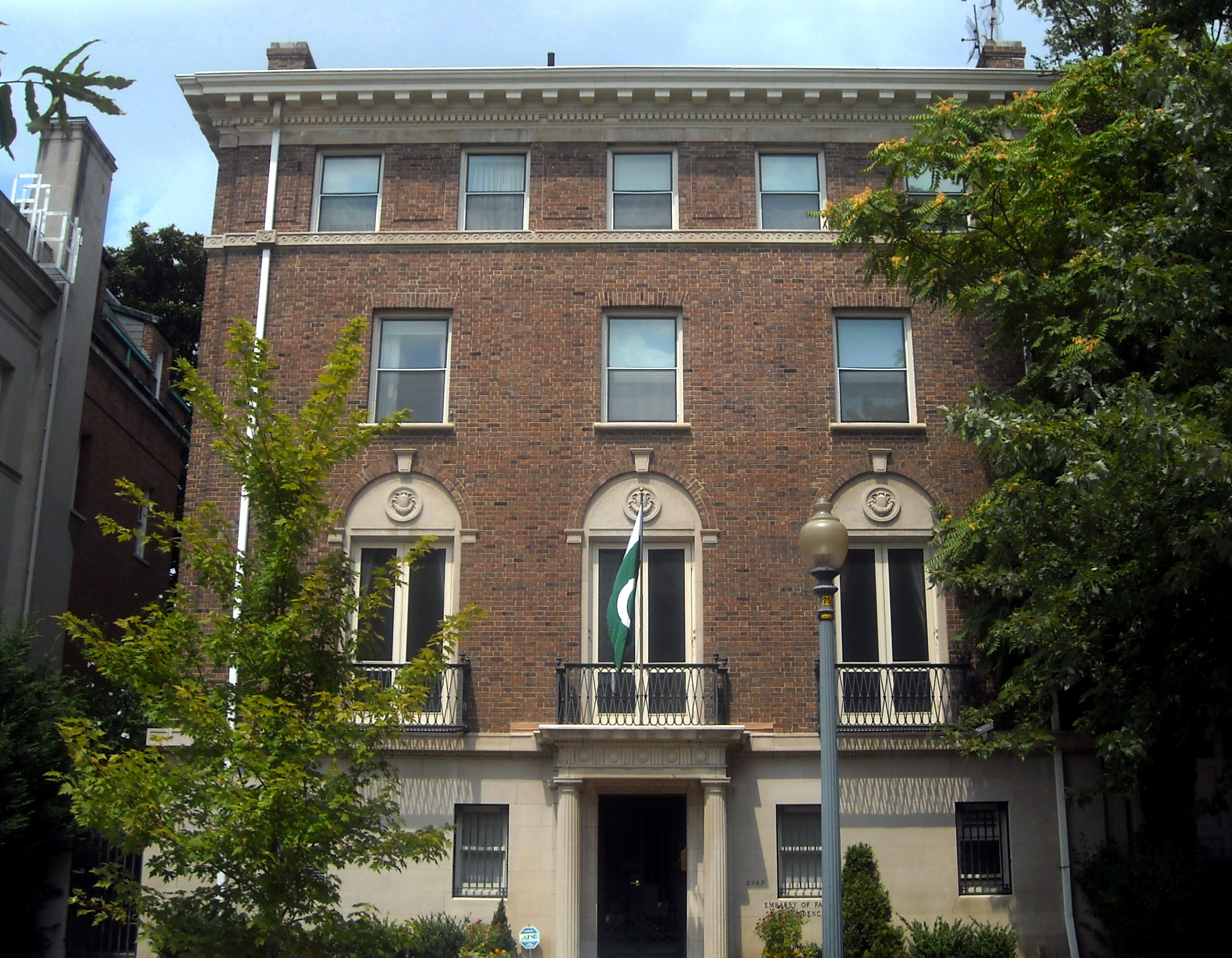
Lodhi stayed at the Pakistani ambassador's residence located in the Kalorama neighborhood of Washington, D.C.

Dr. Lodhi became the Pakistani Ambassador to the United States under two different administrations: from 1993–1996 and then during 1999–2002 (in the process becoming Pakistan's longest ever serving Ambassador to the US), before relinquishing her post on the completion of her second tour of duty. Since 2001, she has also served on the UN Secretary General's Advisory Board on Disarmament Affairs (2001–2005) and continued to do so while holding the post of Pakistan's High Commissioner to the United Kingdom (2003–2008).

According to the Los Angeles Times, During a trip of three U.S. senators to Islamabad, Benazir Bhutto introduced Lodhi by saying "Meet Maleeha. She's my strongest critic." The same source claims that she is said to have brokered Bhutto's access to the late chief of army staff, Asif Nawaz, which helped pave the way for Bhutto's return to power in 1993. In 1995, The New York Times published a letter from Lodhi critical of the time's editorial suggesting cutting aid to Pakistan writing that the editorial is "shocking as it echoes the argument of those who are least objective and rational on the issue."

There is the view that during the Cold War, Pakistan was the most allied ally and then, within the space of just a few months, we became America's most sanctioned friend.

— Lodhi talking to The New York Times on 30 September 2001

During her time as Pakistan's ambassador to the U.S she was present at the meeting on 12 September 2001, at the United States Department of State between Deputy Secretary of State Richard Armitage and Lieutenant General Mahmud Ahmed, the head of Pakistan's Inter-Services Intelligence agency. The meeting served as pivotal in Pakistan's role in the war on terror. In 2002, during an interview with CNN, she said that 'We have to draw a distinction here between rooting out terrorism and the issue of self-determination of the Kashmiri people. These are two separate issues'.

A recipient of the 2002 Hilal-i-Imtiaz Presidential Award for Public Service, she is the author of two essay collections: Pakistan's Encounter with Democracy and The External Challenge (Vanguard and Lahore Jang Publications, 1994). Her latest book, Pakistan: Beyond the Crisis State, was published in April 2011 (by C Hurst, Columbia University Press and Oxford University Press). In 1994, Time magazine cited Dr. Lodhi as one of 100 global pacesetters and leaders, who would define the 21st century and was the only person from Pakistan on that list.

We're struggling out here, but there is not enough knowledge. We're depicted sometimes as a rogue state, and that is not fair.

— Lodhi talking to Los Angeles Times on 5 April 1994,

=== High Commissioner to the United Kingdom ===
External videos
- Ambassador Lodhi talked about Pakistan's role in the U.S. lead coalition in Afghanistan and combating global terrorism. She also responded to viewer comments and questions.

On 26 July 2003, Lodhi was appointed as the Pakistan's envoy to the Court of St James's, London by General Musharraf who sized power in the 1999 coup d'état. She served for 5-year, returning to Pakistan in 2008.

=== Ambassador to the United Nations ===
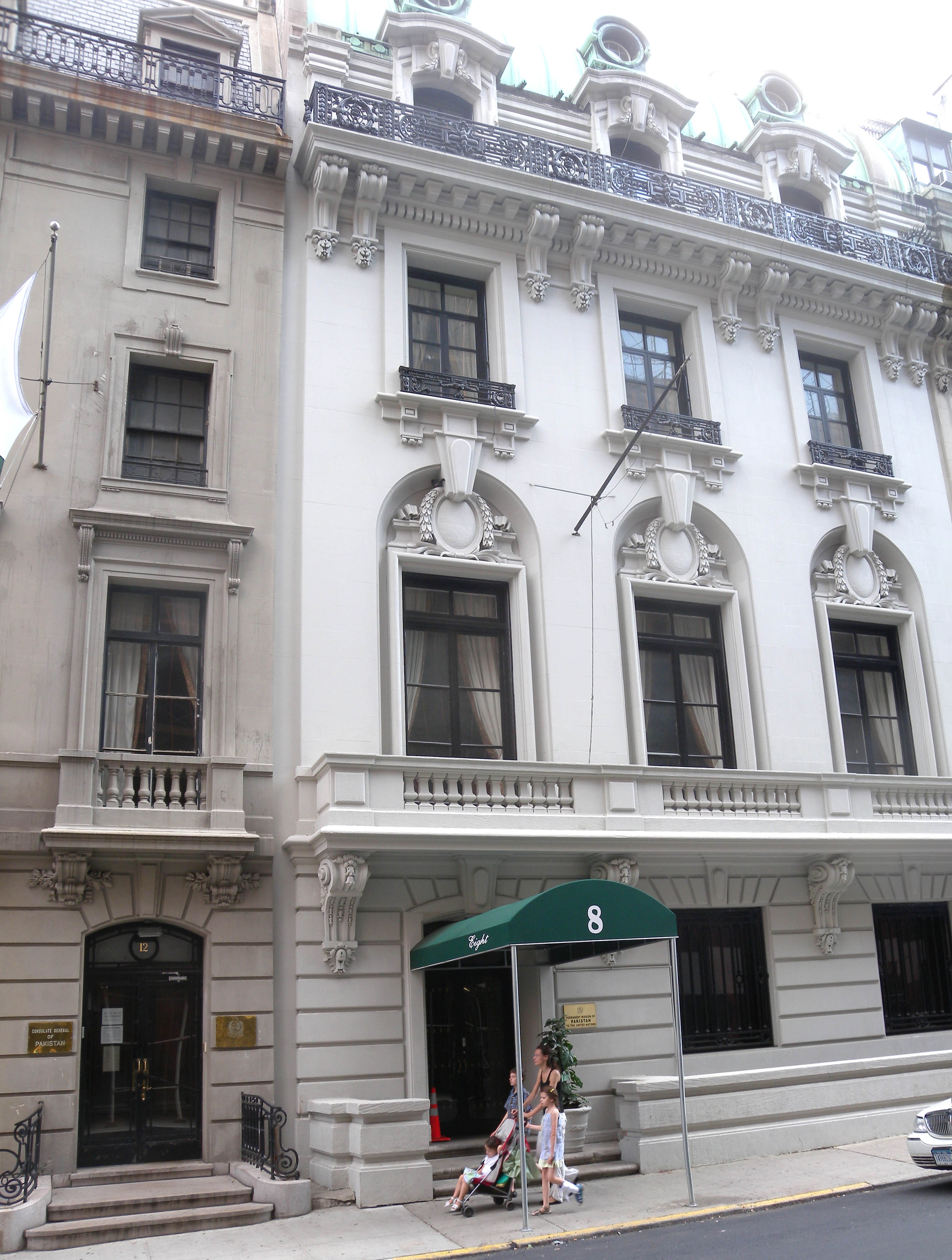
The office of Pakistan's mission to the UN located on the East 65th Street.

According to the Daily Times Pakistan, Prime Minister Nawaz Sharif after extensive consultations with his close aide Sartaj Aziz, decided to appoint Lodhi in the UN. She succeeded Masood Khan in February 2015. Lodhi made her debut address at the United Nations on 6 February 2015 where she called for 'addressing the underlying factors responsible for terrorism so as to formulate an effective and comprehensive response'.

It took my country 67 years to send a woman to the United Nations, it takes a while, but eventually we get there.

— Lodhi talking to United Nations Population Fund Q&A on 11 Mar 2015,

Addressing the Catalytic Partnerships for Gender Equality in Education event in United Nations on 14 March 2015, Lodhi said Pakistan has launched innovative schemes and pilot projects for girls' education. Lodhi also said that the education voucher scheme launched in Punjab, as well as conditional grants that were given in Khyber-Pakhtunkhwa (K-P) have helped in promoting education in Pakistan. She also hosted a reception in honor of ambassadors and other prominent personalities at her residence.

Lodhi while addressing the United Nations Security Council debate on the United Nations Assistance Mission in Afghanistan she said that "The new Afghan government has called for dialogue to resolve differences through political means. There are encouraging indications that the Taliban may be willing to negotiate with the National Unity Government," Lodhi urged that "The Taliban will no doubt test the mettle of the Afghan National Security Force. It will need to demonstrate to them that a military solution is not possible,".

"The prolonged conflict in Afghanistan has not only imposed epic suffering on its people, it has also prevented Afghanistan and the entire region from realizing its immense economic potential. A peaceful and stable Afghanistan is essential for regional stability and economic progress. As Pakistan has affirmed repeatedly, peace in Afghanistan is in Pakistan's vital interest."

— Lodhi at the Security Council Debate on United Nations Assistnce Mission in Afghanistan.

After assuming charge as the President of executive board of UNICEF, Lodhi in an Op-Ed for CNN argued that 'We must never accept a world in which humanitarian aid workers can be attacked and killed with impunity.' Under her leadership UNICEF has reaffirmed commitment to giving every child a fair chance in life. On 9 January 2016, she ended her year long tenure as UNICEF President. Anthony Lake thanked Lodhi for her contribution to achieving UNICEF's goals in 2015. She oversaw adoption of 16 decisions for several UNICEF programmes and endeavours including an increase in the Emergency Programme Fund ceiling.

On 10 March 2016, Lodhi opposed adding new permanent members to the United Nations Security Council with or without a veto, adding that Pakistan supports expansion of the Security Council only in the non-permanent category in order to make the Council more democratic, accountable, effective and transparent.

On 29 August 2015, Lodhi rang the opening bell at the NASDAQ in New York to signal the ceremonial start of trading, saying Pakistan's economy is on the upswing as it pursues liberal economic and investor-friendly policies. This was the first time the stock exchange has opened its doors to an ambassador from Pakistan to ring the opening bell to mark its Independence Day. On 24 April 2016, Lodhi invited Leonardo DiCaprio to Pakistan after a meeting with him at the UN.

On 30 May 2016, talking to the students at Harvard Kennedy School, Lodhi claimed that Pakistan's massive military operation aimed at rooting out terrorism is in its final phase but the menace is not going to just go away unless there is peace on the other side of the border in strife-torn Afghanistan. On 6 January 2017, Lodhi provided a dossier on captured Indian spy Kulbhushan Yadav and evidence of attempted violation of maritime boundary by an Indian submarine to António Guterres. On 7th Febuaray 2017, Lodhi opposed the G4 nations submission on UN security reform saying that it is "inconceivable" to establish any institution that does not value "principles of representation and accountability" through periodic elections. In response to the United States recognition of Jerusalem as Israeli capital, Lodhi said Pakistan "remained a steadfast supporter of the Palestinians despite the kind of threats we have received in recent days from the United States."

On 30 September 2019, she was replaced by Munir Akram, on orders of Prime Minister Imran Khan, as Pakistan's Permanent Representative to the United Nations.

== Public image ==
=== Global image ===
According to The Daily Telegraph, "Lodhi confounds every preconception about Pakistani women. She is sharp, funny, strong willed, articulate and a feminist who hates cooking". According to the New York Times, "Lodhi presents herself as the paradigm of a modern self-made South Asian woman comes in part from her middle-class family heritage. Unlike Benazir Bhutto, whose roots are in the feudal landed gentry, Ms. Lodhi was the daughter of an oil executive and a journalist. She was sent to a convent run by nuns in Rawalpindi for schooling because that was the best education available, and a tolerant atmosphere prevailed. She learned to read the Koran as a child, but hers was a "spiritual household", she said, rather than a strictly religious one."

=== Relationship with Robin Raphel ===
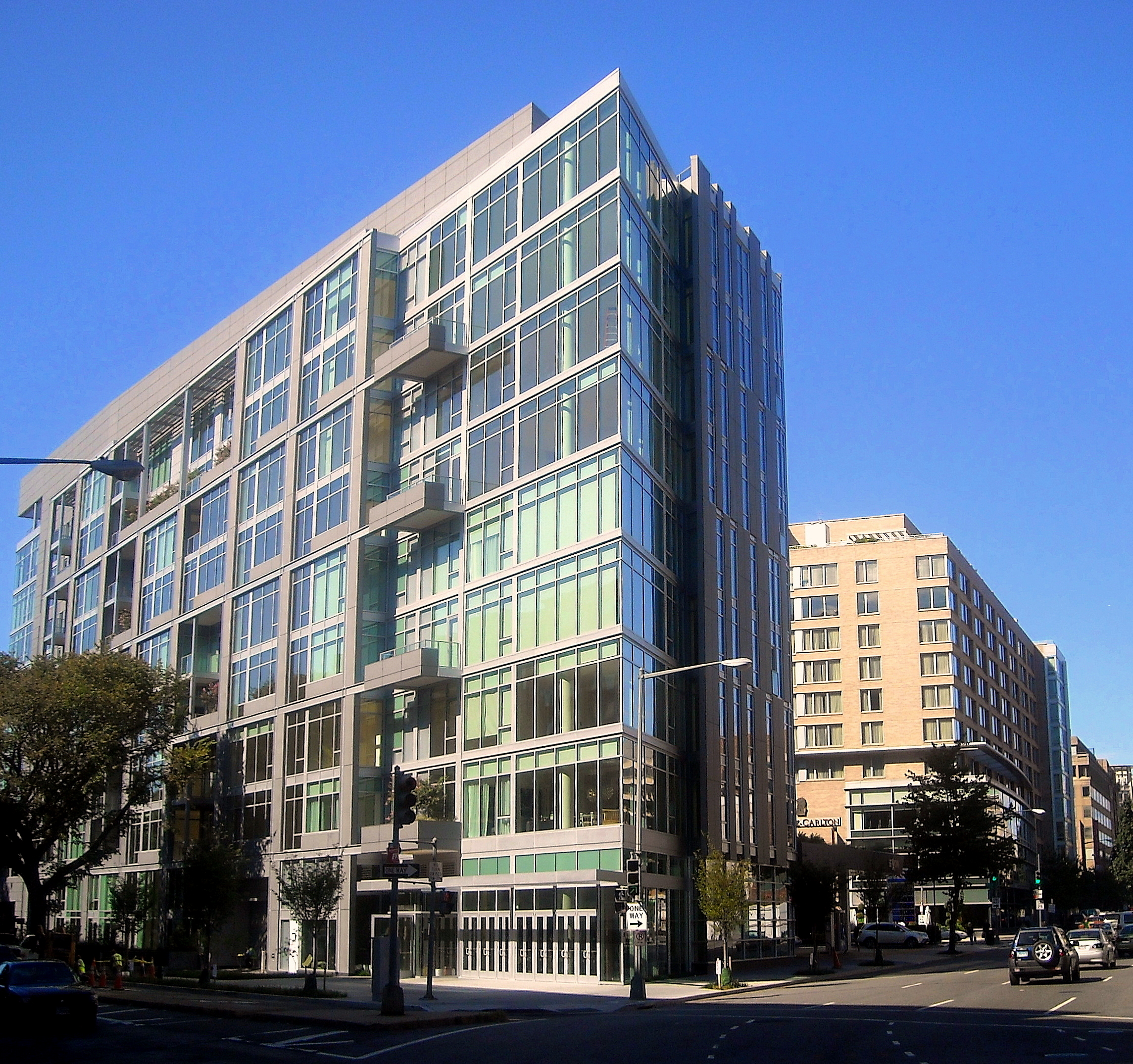
Lodhi and Robin Raphel often held informal meetings at the Rtiz lobby.

On 30 November, an exclusive report by The Wall Street Journal on Robin Raphel, a former Assistant Secretary of State for South and Central Asian Affairs, who was a subject of a federal counterintelligence investigation, showcased close relationship between Lodhi and Raphel. According to report, Raphel and Lodhi turned to each other, on and off, for information and in 2014, the FBI became suspicious of their relationship leading to unsuccessful counterintelligence investigation. The report suggested that Lodhi and Raphel often met at The Ritz-Carlton, Washington, D.C. in the 1990s and worked together for the passage of an act by Senator Hank Brown easing sanctions on Pakistan. The report quoted U.S officials as seeing Lodhi as an "influencer" and saw her a trusted conduit for relaying messages to Pakistan's senior military leadership in Rawalpindi.

=== Relationship with Pakistan Army ===
In February 2016, Pakistan Today reported that Hillary Clinton email's revealed that Lodhi apparently acted as an informal messenger between the Obama Administration and then army chief General Ashfaq Pervez Kayani. In one of the emails by Vali Nasr to Clinton, Nasr wrote that "I got a call from Maleeha Lodhi, who is in London. She gave a message from Kayani", The readout of Kayani's message through Maleeha – running into two paragraphs was classified.

=== Controversies ===
Lodhi was accused of religious bigotry after she deleted a tweet congratulating Mahershala Ali for his Best Supporting Actor Oscar win in 2017. Lodhi had initially congratulated Ali on being the first Muslim actor to win an Oscar. However, Lodhi deleted the tweet after other Twitter users "pointed out" that Ali is an Ahmadiyya- a member of an Islamic sect who are declared non-Muslims in Pakistani constitution.

Lodhi, while responding to Indian Minister of External Affairs Sushma Swaraj's speech branding Pakistan an "exporter of terrorism", in the midst of her 'right to reply', showed a photo of a woman whose face was peppered with wounds and said, "This is the face of Indian democracy," when in actuality, the image depicted a Gazan Arab minor who had sustained bodily cephalic injury in a purported acid attack.

=== Awards ===
- The Hilal-i-Imtiaz award from Pakistan (2002)
- An Honorary Fellowship from the London School of Economics (2004)
- An Honorary Degree of Doctor of Letters from London's Metropolitan University (2005)

== See also ==
- Sara Suleri Goodyear
- Syeda Abida Hussain
- Attiya Inayatullah
- Zubaida Jalal Khan
- Aizaz Ahmad Chaudhry
- Jalil Abbas Jilani
- Foreign Service of Pakistan
- Jugnu Mohsin
- Sherry Rehman
- Fahmida Riaz
- Parveen Shakir
- Kamila Shamsie
- Bapsi Sidhwa
- List of Pakistani journalists

Diplomatic posts
Preceded by Syeda Abida Hussain	Pakistan Ambassador to the United States; January 1994 – January 1997	Succeeded by Riaz Khokhar
Preceded by Tariq Fatemi	2nd term December 1999 – August 2002	Succeeded by Ashraf Qazi
Preceded by Abdul Kader Jaffer	Pakistan High Commissioner to the United Kingdom; April 2003 – June 2008	Succeeded by Wajid Shamsul Hasan
