= Masood Khan =

Pakistani-Kashmiri diplomat

- مسعود خان
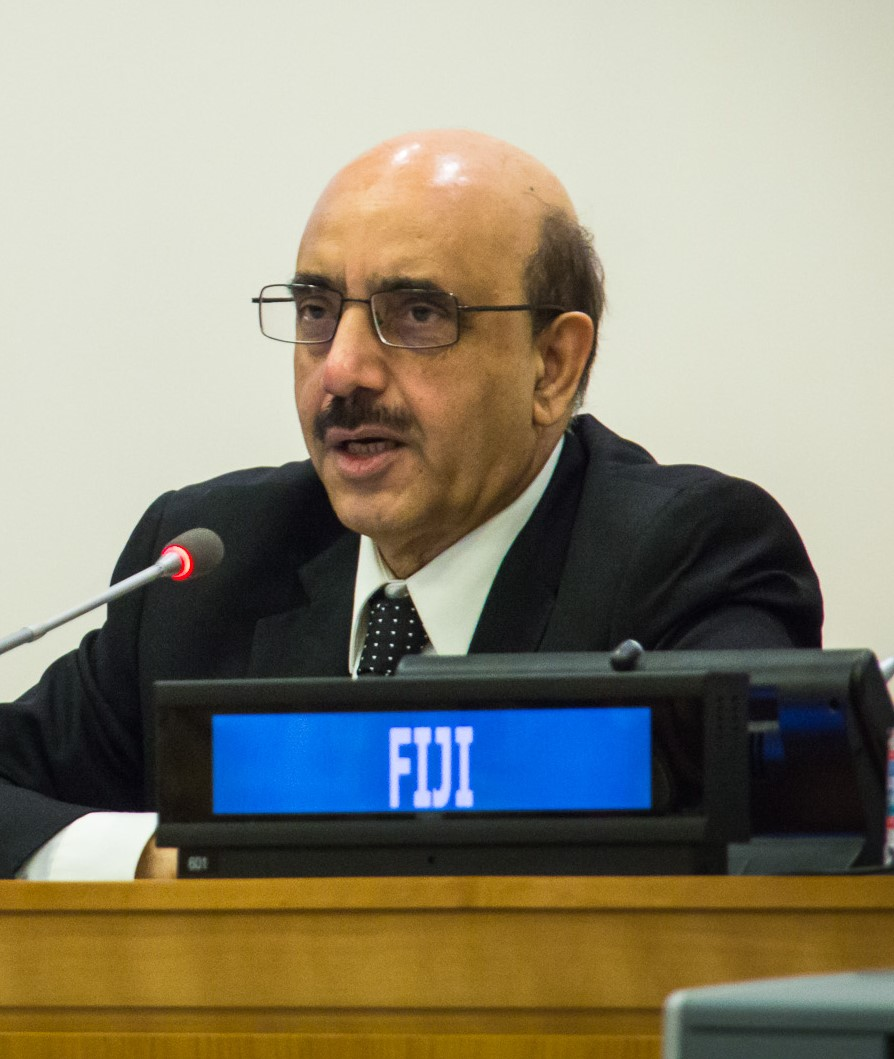
- Khan at the UN in New York on Jan 30, 2015.

President of Azad Kashmir
- In office 25 August 2016 – 25 August 2021
- Prime Minister: Raja Farooq Haider; Abdul Qayyum Khan Niazi
- Preceded by: Sardar Muhammad Yaqoob Khan
- Succeeded by: Sultan Mehmood Chaudhry

Permanent Representative of Pakistan to the United Nations
- In office 11 October 2012 – 7 February 2015
- President: Asif Ali Zardari; Mamnoon Hussain
- Prime Minister: Raja Pervaiz Ashraf; Nawaz Sharif
- Preceded by: Hussain Haroon
- Succeeded by: Maleeha Lodhi

Pakistani Ambassador to China
- In office September 2008 – September 2012
- Appointed by: Yousaf Raza Gillani

Personal details
- Born: Rawalakot, Poonch District, Azad Kashmir

Masood Khan (Urdu: مسعود خان) is a retired Pakistani-Kashmiri diplomat who served as Pakistan's Ambassador to the United States. Khan also served as the 27th President of Azad Kashmir. Khan joined the Foreign Service of Pakistan in 1980. From August 2003 to March 2005, he served as the Spokesperson of the Ministry of Foreign Affairs, Pakistan's Ambassador and Permanent Representative to the United Nations and International Organisations in Geneva, Switzerland, from 2005 to 2008, Pakistan's Ambassador to China between September 2008 and September 2012 and as Pakistan's Permanent Representative to the United Nations, New York, between 11 October 2012 and 7 February 2015.

He served as the Director General of Institute of Strategic Studies Islamabad between February 2015 and 4 August 2016.

== Early life and diplomatic career ==
Khan was born in Rawalakot, Poonch District of Azad Kashmir. When he was in his twenties, he worked as a TV newscaster in English.

Khan holds a master's degree in English and joined the Foreign Service of Pakistan in 1980. His foreign assignments include: Third Secretary in Beijing (1984–1986), Second Secretary and First Secretary at The Hague (1986–1989) and Counselor at United Nations New York (1993–1997) and Political Counselor in Washington, D.C. (1997–2002).

His assignments at the Ministry of Foreign Affairs include: section officer for Europe, Iran and South Asian countries (1980–1982), director for Economic Cooperation Organization, Overseas Pakistanis and International Conferences (1990–1991), director for Secretary General's office (1991–1992), director-general for East Asia and Pacific (2002–2003), director-general for United Nations and Organisation of the Islamic Conference (2003–2004) and spokesman for Pakistan Foreign Office (2003–2005). Masood Khan retired as a career diplomat in 2015.

== Ambassadorial career ==
Masood Khan was appointed Pakistan's permanent representative to United Nations Office at Geneva in March 2005. During this time, he stayed as chairman for many forums including International Organization for Migration Council, Group of 77 at Geneva, Government Group of International Labour Organization (ILO), Conference on Disarmament and Organisation of the Islamic Conference at Geneva. He also served as the President for the Sixth Review Conference of the Biological Toxins and Weapons Convention.

In September 2008, Masood Khan was appointed Pakistan's Ambassador to People's Republic of China replacing Salman Bashir who proceeded as Foreign Secretary at Ministry of Foreign Affairs.

In October 2012, he was appointed Pakistan's Permanent Representative to the United Nations, New York.

In 2022, Khan started serving as Pakistan's Ambassador to the United States.

== Political views ==
=== Support for Kashmiri separatism ===
Masood Khan has shown support for Kashmiri separatism, including calling Burhan Wani, an influential slain Islamist militant, a "hero."

== Writings ==
Masood Khan's publications include the article "Balancing Geo-economics with Geo-politics" as part of Pakistan's first National Security Policy release, where he calls for regional economic integration as well potential peace with India.
