= Mumtaz Zahra Baloch =

Pakistani diplomat

Spokesperson for the Ministry of Foreign Affairs of Pakistan
- Incumbent
- Assumed office November 2022
- Preceded by: Asim Iftikhar

Ambassador of Pakistan to the Republic of Korea
- In office 2020–2021

Deputy Head of Mission at the Embassy of Pakistan in China
- In office 2015–2020

Counsellor for Political Affairs at the Embassy of Pakistan, Washington DC
- In office 2006–2011

Personal details
- Education: University of the Punjab Fletcher School at Tufts University École nationale d'administration

Mumtaz Zahra Baloch is a Pakistani diplomat currently serving as Spokesperson and Additional Foreign Secretary (Strategic Communication Division and Public Diplomacy) in the Ministry of Foreign Affairs of Pakistan. Baloch has held various diplomatic positions including Ambassador of Pakistan to Korea, Minister/Deputy Head of Mission at the Embassy of Pakistan in China, and Counsellor for Political Affairs at the Embassy of Pakistan, Washington, D.C.

== Education ==
Baloch holds a master's degree in physics from University of the Punjab, a Master's in International Relations from Fletcher School at Tufts University in the US, and a degree from the École nationale d'administration, France.

== Diplomatic career ==
Baloch served as the Ambassador of Pakistan to Korea from 2020 to 2021. Before her current role, she served as the Deputy Head of Mission at the Embassy of Pakistan in China from 2015 to 2020. She also held the position of Political Affairs at the Embassy of Pakistan, Washington, D.C. from 2006 to 2011. Earlier in her career, from 1999 to 2002, she was the Second Secretary at the Permanent Mission of Pakistan to the United Nations in Geneva.

== Work in Foreign Ministry ==
Within the Ministry of Foreign Affairs, Baloch held the positions of Director for the United States, Director for the Security Council and Human Rights, and Director of Strategic Planning in the Office of the Secretary of State. In the years 2014–2015, she took on the role of Director (Academic Programme) and subsequently served as the Director General of the Foreign Service Academy in Islamabad.

In November 2022, Baloch was appointed spokesperson of the Ministry of Foreign Affairs, replacing Asim Iftikhar.
