= Tariq Fatemi =

Pakistani diplomat

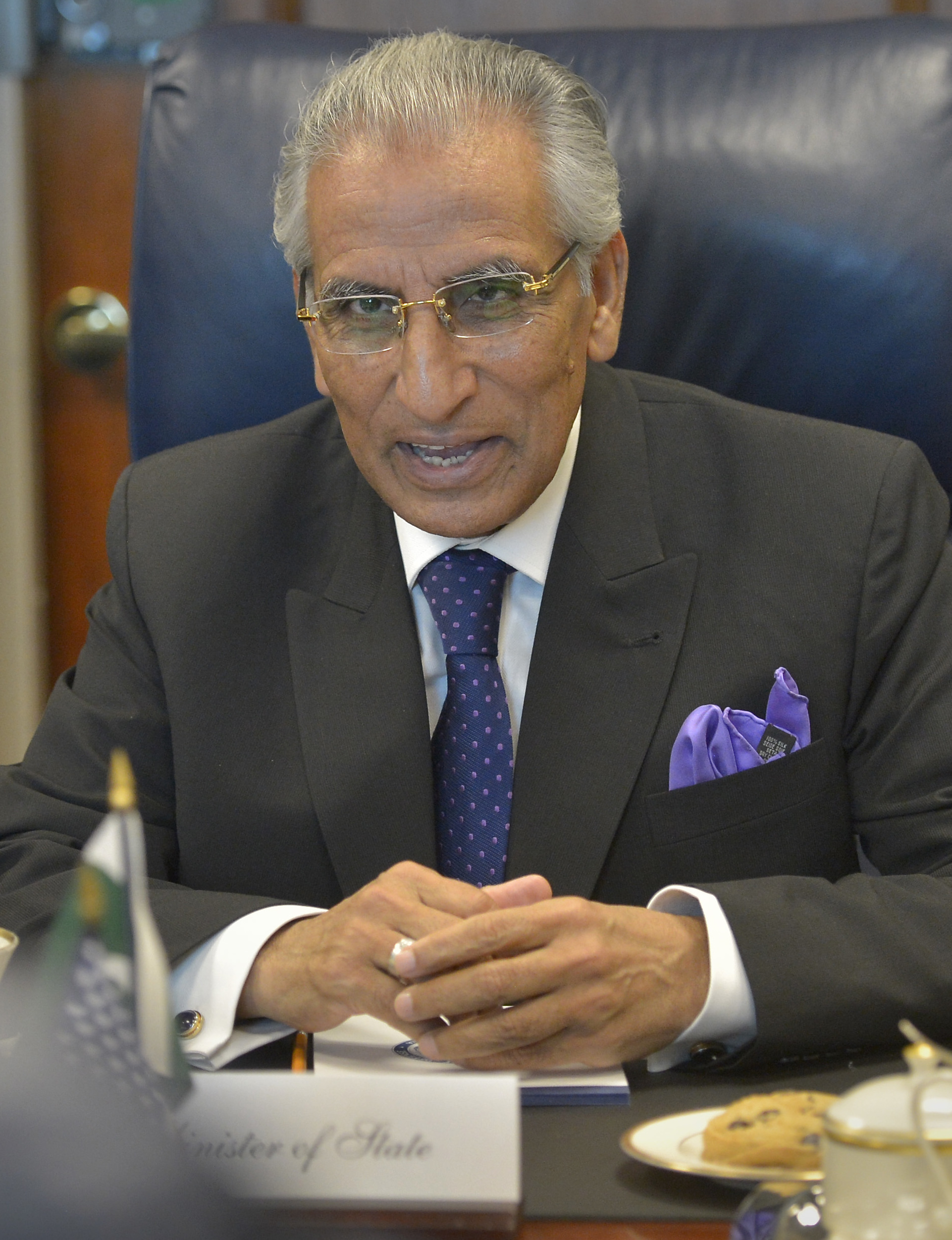

Special Assistant to the Prime Minister for Foreign Affairs
- In office 20 April 2022 – 2 March 2025
- President: Arif Alvi; Asif Ali Zardari
- Prime Minister: Shehbaz Sharif
- Succeeded by: Rana Ahmed Ateeq Anwar
- In office 7 June 2013 – 28 July 2017
- President: Mamnoon Hussain
- Prime Minister: Nawaz Sharif
- Preceded by: Nawabzada Malik Amad Khan

Pakistan Ambassador to the United States
- In office 8 September 1999 – 16 December 1999
- Preceded by: Riaz Khokhar
- Succeeded by: Maliha Lodhi

Personal details
- Born: Syed Tariq Fatemi; 9 July 1944 (age 82) Dacca, East Bengal, British Indian Empire
- Spouse: Zahra Wadood Fatemi
- Education: University of Dhaka; Punjab University; Moscow State University
- Occupation: Diplomat

Syed Tariq Fatemi (Urdu: طارق فاطمى; Bengali: তারিক ফাতেমি; born 9 July 1944) is a Pakistani diplomat who most recently served as Special Assistant on Foreign Affairs to the Prime Minister Shahbaz Sharif till the government completed its term. He previously served as Pakistan Ambassador to the United States and to the European Union.

== Biography ==
Born in Dhaka, British India (present-day Bangladesh), Fatemi went on to serve as a career foreign service officer and has held diplomatic missions throughout his career. In addition, he also provided his foreign policy expertise to represent Pakistan's case at the International Atomic Energy Agency (IAEA). Aside from foreign service, he has briefly taught courses on International relations at the Foreign Service Academy and as well as courses on Security studies at the National Defence University and the Quaid-i-Azam University. A key member of the Pakistan Muslim League (N), he is the author of the book, "The Future of Pakistan", and has repeatedly appeared in news media to comment on foreign affairs of the country. He is an expert on Russian studies and is fluent in Russian language.

Controversy surrounded him during Nawaz Sharif's tenure.

== In the foreign service ==
His career as a Pakistani diplomat is enriched with assignments in Pakistan Missions abroad, including New York, Moscow (twice), Beijing and Washington (twice). He served as Additional Foreign Secretary (Americas and Europe Divisions) and worked in the Prime Minister's Office, in charge of Foreign Affairs, Defense and Defense Production.

From 1982 to 1986, he served as the delegate to the UN General Assembly Sessions and attended several Non-Aligned and OIC Conferences, while being the member of the UN-sponsored Geneva negotiations on Afghanistan.

In 1999, Fatemi was promoted to the rank of a Federal Secretary—the highest rank in the country's civil service.

He also served as the High Commissioner (Ambassador) of Pakistan to Zimbabwe and later served as the Ambassador of Pakistan to the US, Jordan, Belgium, Luxembourg and then to European Union (Brussels) and retired in 2004.

After his retirement, he joined the Pakistan Muslim League (N) and assisted the party on various foreign policy matters.

== At the PMO ==
In April 2017, the Prime Minister's Office issued directives to remove Fatemi from his post as Special Assistant to the Prime Minister on Foreign Affairs, for his alleged role in Dawn Leaks. Earlier, an inquiry committee had held Fatemi responsible for the Dawn Leaks. The allegation was rejected by Fatemi in a farewell letter.

On 20 April 2022, Prime Minister Shehbaz Sharif appointed Syed Tariq Fatemi as his special assistant on foreign affairs.

== Personal life ==
His wife Zahra Wadood Fatemi was a member of the National Assembly of Pakistan most recently from August 2018 to August 2023. He has four daughters and four grandchildren. He is fluent in Russian and Bengali.
