= Tehmina Janjua =

Pakistani politician

Secretary Tehmina Janjua
- تہمینہ جنجوعہ
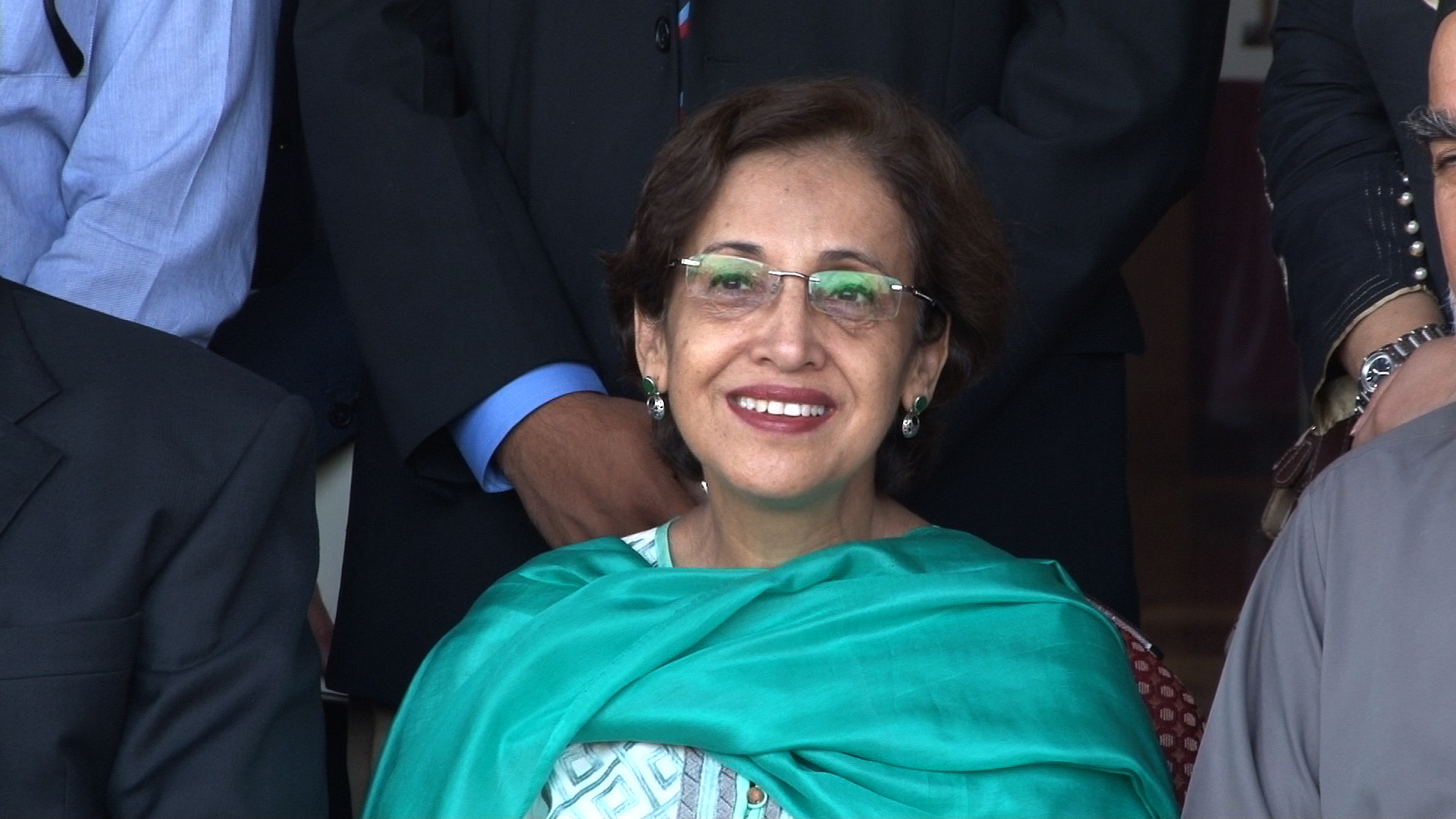
- Janjua in 2017

Foreign Secretary of Pakistan
- In office 13 February 2017 – 16 April 2019
- Prime Minister: Nawaz Sharif; Shahid Khaqan Abbasi; Imran Khan
- Preceded by: Aizaz Ahmad Chaudhry
- Succeeded by: Sohail Mahmood

Permanent Representative of Pakistan to the United Nations Office at Geneva
- In office 6 October 2015 – 2017
- Preceded by: Zamir Akram

Pakistan's Ambassador to Italy, Albania, San Marino and Slovenia
- In office 2013–2015

Spokesperson of Ministry of Foreign Affairs Islamabad & Director General (Strategic Planning) Foreign Secretary's Office
- In office 2011–2013

Personal details
- Education: Quaid-e-Azam University; Columbia University (MIA)

Tehmina Janjua (Urdu: تہمینہ جنجوعہ) is a retired Pakistani career diplomat who served in BPS-22 grade (highest attainable rank for a serving officer) as the Foreign Secretary of Pakistan. She is a member of the Islamabad Policy Research Institute's Board of Governors. Among her other notable appointments, was her position as Pakistan's Representative to the United Nations in Geneva and as ambassador to Italy, with concurrent accreditation to Albania, San Marino and Slovenia.

== Education ==
After studying French literature at the Quaid-e-Azam University, Janjua joined the Foreign Service of Pakistan in 1984. She later went on to receive a Masters in International Affairs from the School of International and Public Affairs, Columbia University (SIPA), in 1989.

== Career ==
The first major career appointment that Tehmina Janjua had was from 1986 to 1987, as the desk officer to the Soviet Union and Eastern Europe in the Foreign Office. In 1989, she served as the acting director of the Office of the National Security Adviser. Following her time at the Ministry of Foreign Affairs in Islamabad, Janjua completed her first mission abroad as the Second Secretary and then the First Secretary of the Permanent Mission of Pakistan to the United Nations, New York from 1990 to 1995.

After returning to Pakistan for a year to serve as Director Foreign Secretary's Office, Janjua was posted to Geneva as Counsellor Pakistan Mission to the United Nations and Other International Organizations in 1996. During her time as Counsellor, she represented Pakistan at the Organization of Islamic Conference in March 1997, reiterating the importance of promoting a better image of Islam and Muslims. The following year at a commission on human rights in April, on the topic of Kashmir she brought up the right to self-determination and the need for protecting individuals against human rights abuses.

When her time as Counsellor in Geneva ended, she returned to Pakistan to serve as the Director Minister of State for Foreign Affairs' Office in 2000. A few years later, in 2004 she served as Director at the Foreign Secretary's Office. In April 2004, while representing Pakistan in Geneva at the United Nations, Tehmina Janjua spoke in support of women's rights, detailing Pakistan's efforts to empower women politically and economically. The following year, her experience was utilized as Deputy Permanent Representative of Pakistan to the United Nations and Other International Organizations, in Geneva until 2009.

From 2009 till 2011, Janjua served as the Director General of Strategic Planning in the Foreign Secretary's Office. After replacing Abdul Basit in February 2011, Janjua became the Spokesperson of the Ministry of Foreign Affairs of Pakistan. As Spokesperson, Janjua provided important details of the safe return of Pakistanis from Libya, the on-going Indo-Pak talks and the drone strikes initiated by the United States during her term.

She served as the Ambassador of Pakistan to Italy between December 2011 and October 2015. On 6 October 2015, Janjua became Pakistan's envoy to the UN Office in Geneva. In December 2016, she became the first woman, and the first developing country representative, to preside over the Convention on Certain Conventional Weapons.

=== Foreign Secretary of Pakistan ===
In February 2017, Prime Minister Nawaz Sharif appointed Janjua as Pakistan's Foreign Secretary, succeeding Aizaz Ahmad Chaudhry. The appointment made Janjua the first woman to hold the highest ranking position in the Ministry of Foreign Affairs. After serving as Foreign Secretary of Pakistan, Janjua was appointed the new envoy to China in April 2019.
