= Riaz Khokhar =

Pakistani diplomat (1942–2023)

Riaz Hussain Khokhar
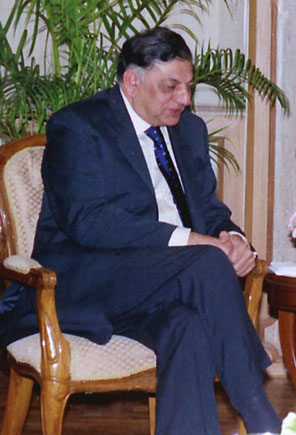
- Khokhar in 2004

Foreign Secretary of Pakistan
- In office June 2002 – February 2005
- Preceded by: Inam-ul-Haq
- Succeeded by: Riaz Mohammad Khan

Pakistan ambassador to China
- In office 1999–2002

Pakistan ambassador to the United States
- In office 1997–1999

Pakistan ambassador to India
- In office 1992–1997

Personal details
- Born: 31 December 1942
- Died: 26 December 2023 (aged 80)

Riaz Hussain Khokhar (Urdu: ریاض کھو کھر; 31 December 1942 – 26 December 2023) was a Pakistani diplomat who served as the Foreign Secretary of Pakistan from June 2002 to February 2005. Khokhar also served as Pakistan's ambassador to India (1992–1997), the United States (1997–1999), and the People's Republic of China (1999–2002), before taking on the top post of the foreign ministry as Foreign Secretary of Pakistan.

== Life and career ==
Riaz Hussain Khokhar was born on 31 December 1942. He joined the Foreign Service of Pakistan on 10 October 1966. In September 2003, Riaz Khokhar briefed a group of Kashmiri leaders on the upcoming India-Pakistan talks before he left for New Delhi for talks with India.

In 2004, former president of Pakistan-controlled Kashmir, Sardar Muhammad Abdul Qayyum Khan reportedly said, "The Kashmiri leadership supported the composite dialogue between the two countries but noted that the talks should not be held at the expense of Kashmir."

Again in 2004, All Parties Hurriyat Conference of Kashmir also expressed their support to the ongoing dialogue between India and Pakistan. They reportedly said that the talks should continue until the Kashmir dispute is resolved.

On 29 June 2004, Pakistani Foreign Secretary, Riaz Khokhar stated, "In my judgement I found and saw that the Indian side was serious and committed and determined to move forward on the composite dialogue."

Khokhar died on 26 December 2023, at the age of 80.

Diplomatic posts
Preceded by Abdul Sattar	Pakistan High Commissioner to India; 1992–1997	Succeeded by Ashraf Qazi
Preceded by Maliha Lodhi	Pakistan Ambassador to the United States; 1997–1999	Succeeded by Tariq Fatemi
Preceded by Inam-ul-Haq	Pakistan Ambassador to China; 1999–2002	Succeeded by Riaz Mohammad Khan
Preceded by Inam-ul-Haq	Foreign Secretary of Pakistan; 2002–2005	Succeeded by Riaz Mohammad Khan
