= Abdullah Hussain Haroon =

Pakistani politician

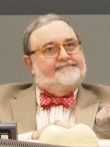

Caretaker Federal Minister of Foreign Affairs, Defence, Defence Production
- In office 5 June 2018 – 18 August 2018
- President: Mamnoon Hussain
- Prime Minister: Nasirul Mulk
- Preceded by: Khurram Dastgir Khan
- Succeeded by: Shah Mehmood Qureshi

Permanent Representative of Pakistan to the United Nations
- In office September 2008 – October 2012
- Preceded by: Munir Akram
- Succeeded by: Masood Khan

Personal details
- Born: 21 October 1950 (age 76) Karachi, Sindh, Pakistan
- Relatives: Abdullah Haroon (grandfather)
- Education: Karachi Grammar School; University of Karachi

Abdullah Hussain Haroon (Urdu: عبداللہ حسین ہارون; born 21 October 1950) is a Pakistani politician, and businessman who served as Foreign Minister of Pakistan in the Mulk caretaker ministry. He previously served as the Speaker of Sindh Assembly and Pakistan Ambassador to the United Nations from September 2008 to October 2012.

A scion of the Haroon family, he is a businessman, social activist and a former Sindh Assembly speaker who was a board member of various educational institutes, sports associations and charity organisations.

== Early life and education ==
Hussain Haroon is the son of Saeed Haroon, elder brother of Hameed Haroon and grandson of Sir Abdullah Haroon, a politician, who Muhammad Ali Jinnah called one of the strongest pillars of the All-India Muslim League. He belongs to a well-known Memon family. He completed his education from Karachi Grammar School about the same time as Benazir Bhutto did, and later he finished his education at the University of Karachi.

== Career ==
Haroon began his early career in public service as election Coordinator for Pakistan Muslim League in 1970. Later he served as Councilor, Karachi Metropolitan Corporation (KMC) (1979–1985); Trustee Karachi Port Trust (KPT) (1980–1982); Member Provincial Assembly of Sindh (1985–1988), Speaker, Provincial Assembly of Sindh (1985–1986); and leader of opposition, Provincial Assembly of Sindh (1986–1988).

Hussain Haroon has also served as Consultant, Pakistan Herald Publications Limited (PHPL) (1988–1989); delegate to the United Nations General Assembly; Member to the Board of Governors, Institute of Business Administration, Karachi (1996–1999); Director Board of Directors Karachi Electric Supply Corporation (KESC) (1997–1999); chairman, Griffith College Karachi (1999–2005) and President, Pakistan-China Business Forum (1999–2004). He is the president of English Speaking Union of Pakistan and also has the distinction of being the youngest president of the elite Sind Club.

Haroon was given the portfolios of Ministry of Foreign Affairs, National Security Division, Ministry of Defence and Ministry of Defence Production on 5 June 2018 to assist the Caretaker Prime Minister of Pakistan, Nasirul Mulk in managing the country till the 2018 Pakistani general election. He was given the oath of office by the President of Pakistan on 5 June 2018.

== Social activism ==
Haroon has demanded the establishment of a town on the outskirts of Karachi and proposed that it be named after late Benazir Bhutto. His suggestion was that up to six million people from the interior Sindh be settled there. He was also part of the protest against real estate development in Bundal Island by UAE-based Emaar Properties. Haroon is also known to have ably advocated the Sindh case against the Kalabagh Dam.

In 2017, he had become disillusioned with his former political party's leadership, Pakistan Peoples Party and was leaving himself open to negotiations to join other Pakistani political parties and also left open the possibility for himself of contesting for a position in the upcoming general elections in Pakistan in 2018.

== Ambassador to UN ==
In August 2008, Hussain Haroon was appointed as the Permanent Representative of Pakistan to the United Nations replacing veteran Munir Akram. The appointment was controversial because Haroon had no prior experience in the Pakistan Foreign Service or international diplomacy. He took over the post on 3 September 2008. Masood Khan, a career diplomat took over from Hussain Haroon on 1 January 2013.

Diplomatic posts
Preceded by Munir Akram	Pakistan Ambassador to the United Nations; 2008 – December 2012	Succeeded by Masood Khan
