= List of ambassadors of Pakistan to China =

Coordinates: 39.942076°N 116.460718°E

Ambassador of Pakistan to China
- Incumbent; Ali Asad Gilani since September 12, 2026
- Inaugural holder: Ahmed Ali (writer)
- Formation: 1951

The Pakistani ambassador in Beijing is the official representative of the government in Islamabad to the Government of the People's Republic of China.

== List of representatives ==
Diplomatic agrément/Diplomatic accreditation	Ambassador	Observations	Presidents and/or prime ministers of Pakistan	Premier of the People's Republic of China	Term end
1951	Ahmed Ali	Nawabzada Agha Mohammad Raza Raza	Liaquat Ali Khan	Zhou Enlai	?
1953	Sultanuddin Ahmad		Iskander Mirza	Zhou Enlai	?
1958	Abdul Motaleb Malik		Ayub Khan	Zhou Enlai	1961
1961	Ali Muhammad Rashidi	Pir Ali Muhammed Rashdi	Ayub Khan	Zhou Enlai	1962
1962	Nawagzada Agha Mohamed Raza		Ayub Khan	Zhou Enlai	1966
1966	Sultan Mohammad Khan		Ayub Khan	Zhou Enlai	1968
1969	Khwaja Mohammed Kaiser		Yahya Khan	Zhou Enlai	1972
1972	Agha Shahi		Zulfikar Ali Bhutto	Zhou Enlai	1973
1973	Mumtaz Ali Alvie		Fazal Ilahi Chaudhry	Zhou Enlai	1978
1978	Muhammad Yunus Gangi		Mohammed Zia ul-Haq	Hua Guofeng	1982
1982	Maqbool Ahmad Bhatty		Mohammed Zia ul-Haq	Zhao Ziyang	1988
January 14, 1987	Akram Zaki		Mohammed Zia ul-Haq	Li Peng	1991
1991	Khalid Mahmood	Ambassador to China, Saudi Arabia, Iran, Iraq and Mongolia.	Ghulam Ishaq Khan	Li Peng	1994
1994	Ashraf Qazi		Benazir Bhutto	Li Peng	1997
April 15, 1997	Inam-ul-Haq		Wasim Sajjad	Li Peng	1999
1999	Riaz Khokhar		Muhammad Rafiq Tarar	Zhu Rongji	2002
2002	Riaz Mohammad Khan		Pervez Musharraf	Zhu Rongji	2005
2005	Salman Bashir	Salman Bashir, the 17th Pakistani Ambassador in China	Pervez Musharraf	Wen Jiabao	2008
September 1, 2008	Masood Khan		Asif Ali Zardari	Wen Jiabao	November 2012
April 22, 2013	Masood Khalid		Asif Ali Zardari	Li Keqiang	July 2019
July 12, 2019	Naghmana A. Hashmi		Arif Alvi	Li Keqiang	July 19, 2020
July 31, 2020	Moin ul Haque		Arif Alvi	Li Keqiang	November 2023
November 11, 2023	Khalil-ur-Rehman Hashmi		Shehbaz Sharif	Li Qiang	September 2026
September 12, 2026	Ali Asad Gilani		Asif Ali Zardari	Li Qiang	_
