= Munir Akram =

Pakistani diplomat

His Excellency Munir Akram
- منير اکرم
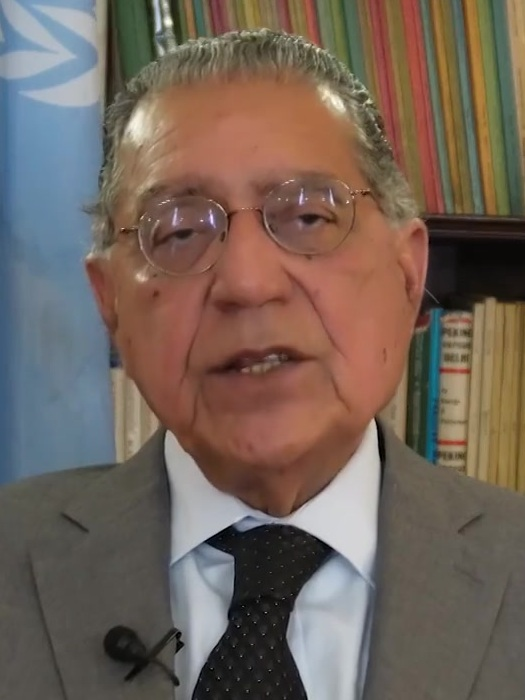

Permanent Representative of Pakistan to the United Nations
- In office 1 November 2019 – 31 March 2025
- President: Arif Alvi; Asif Ali Zardari
- Prime Minister: Imran Khan; Shahbaz Sharif; Anwaar ul Haq Kakar (caretaker); Shahbaz Sharif
- Preceded by: Maleeha Lodhi
- Succeeded by: Asim Iftikhar Ahmad
- In office 28 May 2002 – 26 July 2008
- President: Pervez Musharraf
- Prime Minister: Mir Zafarullah Khan Jamali; Chaudhry Shujaat Hussain; Shaukat Aziz; Yousaf Raza Gillani
- Preceded by: Shamshad Ahmad
- Succeeded by: Hussain Haroon

76th President of the United Nations Economic and Social Council
- In office 23 July 2020 – 23 July 2021
- Preceded by: Mona Juul
- Succeeded by: Collen Vixen Kelapile

Personal details
- Born: 14 February 1945 (age 81) Karachi, British India
- Education: University of Karachi
- Occupation: Diplomat

Munir Akram (Urdu: منير اکرم; born 2 December 1945) is a Pakistani former diplomat who served twice as the Permanent Representative of Pakistan to the United Nations. First, he held the post from 2002 to 2008, during which time he also served two terms as President of the United Nations Security Council. His second stint in the post was from 2019 to 2025. On 23 July 2020, Akram was elected President of the United Nations Economic and Social Council, serving until July 2021.

== Early life and education ==
Akram received a Bachelor's degree in law from the University of Karachi, before studying for a Master's degree in political science at the same institution. He cleared the elite Central Superior Services examinations in 1968 to enter public service.

== Diplomatic career ==
After mandatory training, he formally joined the Foreign Service of Pakistan in 1969, his first posting being as second secretary at Pakistan's Permanent Mission to the United Nations. Later, in addition to holding various positions at the Foreign Ministry, he served in several important diplomatic missions, including as Pakistan's ambassador to Japan (1982–1985) and to the European Union (1988–1992).

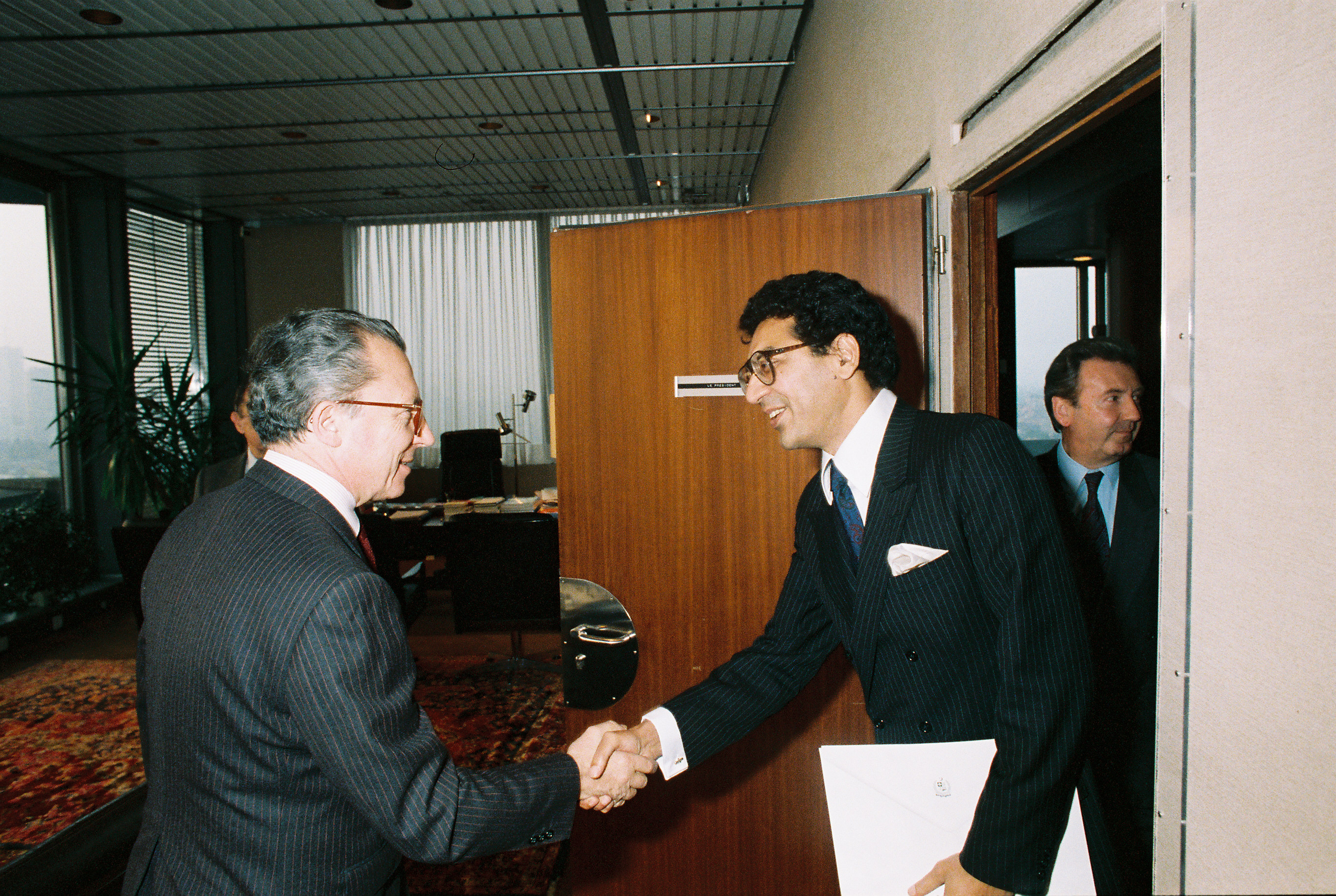
Munir Akram (right) with Jacques Delors

Akram served as Permanent Representative of Pakistan to the United Nations Office at Geneva from 1995 to 2002, before holding the same post in New York, where he served until 2008. He had reached superannuation in 2005, but was hired again on an extension contract. He was dismissed by the newly elected President, Asif Ali Zardari, in 2008 because of his disagreement over presenting the case of the assassination of Benazir Bhutto to the United Nations. He also served as President of the Security Council for two separate terms, in 2002 and 2004.

On 30 September 2019 Akram was reappointed as Permanent Representative to the United Nations in New York. He held the post till March 2025.

== Board memberships and advisory roles ==
Akram is an advisory board member of the Counter Extremism Project. He is also a former board member of Allis-Chalmers Energy, serving at the company between September 2008 and June 2009.

== Controversies ==
=== Legal issues ===
In 2003 Akram's then live-in girlfriend, Marijana Mihic, called the police to report him for alleged violent assault against her. Her report included charges of previous incidents of violence. While the New York Police Department did not arrest Akram owing to his diplomatic immunity, the case was pursued by the New York County District Attorney, Robert Morgenthau, with the backing of Majorie Tiven, sister of the then Mayor, Michael Bloomberg.

In February 2003, the District Attorney's office dropped the investigation after the Marijana Mihic retracted her allegations.

== Writings ==
Akram is a regular columnist for Pakistan's leading English daily newspaper Dawn. He has also authored the chapter "Reversing Strategic 'Shrinkage'" in the book Pakistan: Beyond the 'Crisis State' edited by Maleeha Lodhi and published by Oxford University Press in 2011.

Diplomatic posts
| Preceded by Shamshad Ahmad | Pakistan Ambassador to the United Nations; 2002–2008 | Succeeded by Hussain Haroon |
