= Ashraf Qazi =

Pakistani diplomat

Ashraf Jehangir Qazi
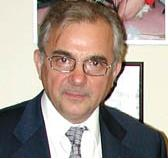

Ambassador of Pakistan to China Pakistan Ambassador to the United States UN Special Envoy to Iraq

Personal details
- Born: 1942 (age 83–84)

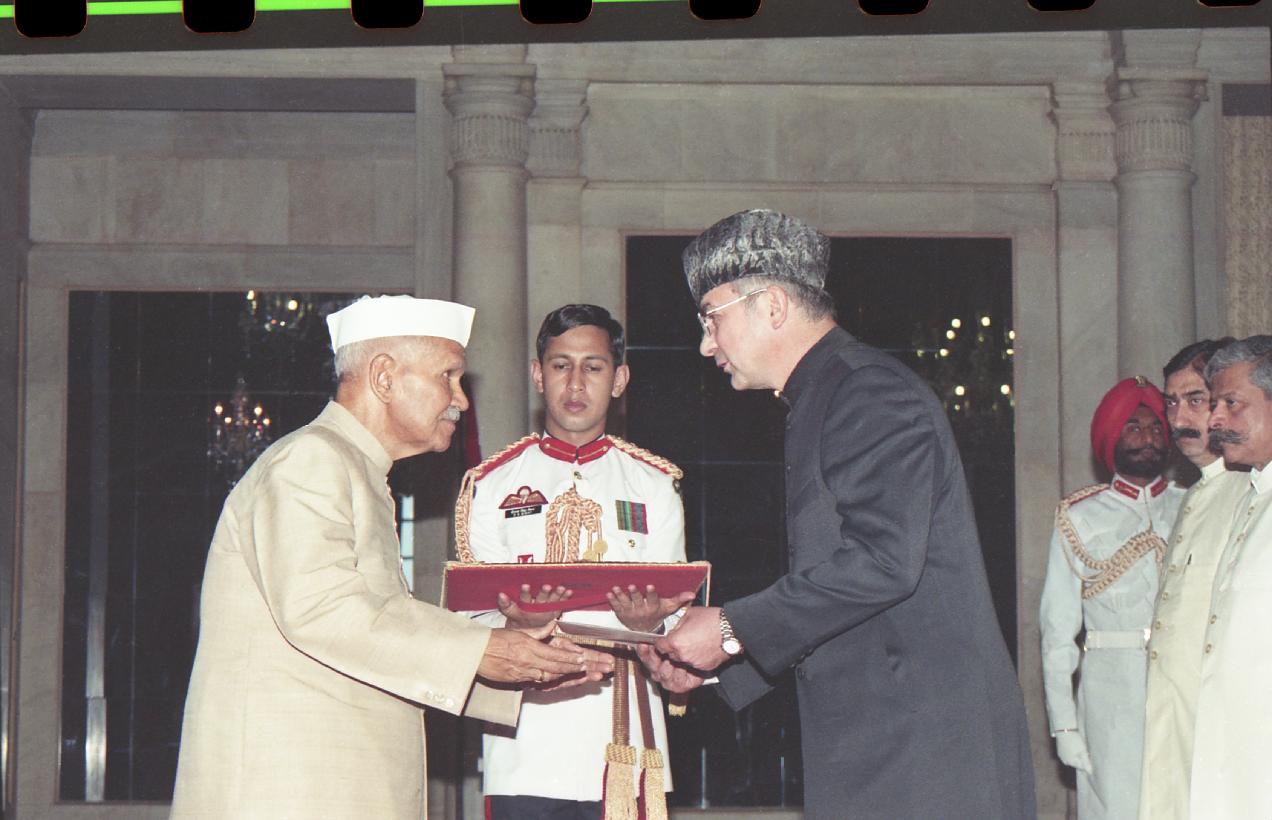
Ashraf Jehangir Qazi presenting his credentials to the President of India, Shankar Dayal Sharma

Ashraf Jehangir Qazi (Urdu: اشرف جہانگیر قاضی; born 1942) is a Pakistani diplomat and politician who has held several national and international appointments, including serving with the United Nations.

== Diplomatic career ==
In 2004, UN Secretary-General Kofi Annan had named him as the head of the UN mission in Iraq where he helped co-ordinate humanitarian and reconstruction efforts. Before that appointment, he was serving as Pakistan's ambassador to the United States in Washington, D.C.

In 2007, Qazi was appointed as a special representative of UN Secretary-General Ban Ki-moon in Sudan. He completed his tenure in Sudan in 2010. Between 2004 and 2007, he was the Special Representative of the Secretary-General in charge of the United Nations Assistance Mission in Iraq.

Between 2002 and 2004, Qazi was Pakistan's ambassador to the United States. Before that, he was Pakistan's High Commissioner to India since 1997 and ambassador to Syria (1986–88), East Germany (1990–91), Russia (1991–94), and later to China (1994–97). While at the Ministry of Foreign Affairs in Islamabad, he served as director of East Asia (1975–1978), director-general for Policy Planning, Afghanistan (1982–1986) and Additional Foreign Secretary for Policy Planning, Afghanistan, Soviet Union and Eastern Europe (1988–1990). He also has had diplomatic assignments in Copenhagen, Tokyo, Cairo, Tripoli and London.

== Personal life ==
Ashraf Qazi was the only son of an ethnic Hazara father, Qazi Mohammad Musa, and an Irish mother, Jennifer Musa. His father belonged to the prominent Qazi family of Balochistan, whose notable members included Ashraf's paternal uncle, Qazi Muhammad Essa, a leading figure of the Pakistan Movement; and Essa's son Qazi Faez Isa, a jurist who is the former Chief Justice of Pakistan and who formerly served as the Chief Justice of Balochistan High Court. Ashraf's paternal grandfather served as the prime minister of the princely Kalat State.

His mother was Catholic and a native of County Kerry, Ireland. Ashraf's parents met in England in 1939 while his father was studying philosophy at Oxford; they married in 1940, and settled in his paternal family's hometown of Pishin in Balochistan in 1947, from where his mother eventually came into Pakistani politics. In 1956, when Ashraf was aged 14, his father died in a road accident. He was thus raised by his mother. Ashraf has five half-siblings from his father's first marriage.

Diplomatic posts
Preceded by Khalid Mahmood	Pakistan Ambassador to China; 1994–1997	Succeeded by Inam-ul-Haq
Preceded by Riaz Khokhar	Pakistan High Commissioner to India; 1997–2002	Succeeded by Aziz Ahmed Khan
Preceded by Maliha Lodhi	Pakistan Ambassador to the United States; 2002–2004	Succeeded by Jehangir Karamat
Preceded by Sérgio Vieira de Mello	UN Special Envoy to Iraq; 2004–2007	Succeeded by Staffan de Mistura
Preceded by Manuel de Aranda e Silva	UN SRSG in the Sudan; 2007–present	Succeeded by Incumbent
