= Jamsheed Marker =

Pakistani diplomat (1922–2018)

Ambassador Jamsheed Marker

Pakistan Ambassador to the United Nations
- In office September 1990 – March 1995
- Prime Minister: Benazir Bhutto
- Preceded by: Sardar Shah Nawaz
- Succeeded by: Ahmad Kamal

Pakistan Ambassador to the United States
- In office 17 September 1986 – 30 June 1989
- Prime Minister: Muhammad Khan Junejo
- Preceded by: Ejaz Azim
- Succeeded by: Zulfiqar Ali Khan

Personal details
- Born: 24 November 1922 Hyderabad, India
- Died: 21 June 2018 (aged 95) Karachi, Sindh, Pakistan
- Spouses: Arnaz Minwalla; Diana Dinshaw (d. 1979)
- Children: 2
- Education: The Doon School; Forman Christian College University

Military service
- Allegiance: British India
- Branch/service: Royal Indian Navy
- Battles/wars: World War II in Burma

Jamsheed Marker (24 November 1922 – 21 June 2018) was a Pakistani diplomat and a cricket commentator. A recipient of the Hilal-e-Imtiaz, he was associated with diplomatic career for over 42 years. He was notable for his tenure as Ambassador to the United States, serving from 17 September 1986 to 30 June 1989 during the administrations of Prime Ministers Muhammad Khan Junejo and Benazir Bhutto. He claimed to have helped negotiate the Soviet military withdrawal from Afghanistan.

From 1995 through 2005, Marker taught a course in "Diplomacy in International Relations" at Eckerd College, a private liberal arts college in St. Petersburg, Florida.

== Awards and recognition ==
- Hilal-i-Imtiaz Award (Crescent of Excellence) by President Pervez Musharraf in 2003.
- Sitara-i-Quaid-e-Azam Award

== Early life ==
Jamsheed Kekobad Ardeshir Marker was born in Hyderabad, British India, on 24 November 1922, into a distinguished Parsee (Parsi), or Zoroastrian, family that had been in the shipping business. His father was Kekobad Ardeshir Marker, who ran the family pharmaceutical business, and his mother was Meherbano Marker (née Pestonji), a homemaker.

He attended the elite Doon boarding school (The Doon School) in Dehradun, India, and Forman Christian College University in Lahore, Pakistan.

In early days at school level, in Dehradun located in India, Marker played cricket there and later at F.C. College Lahore.

== Career ==
During World War II, Marker was an officer in the Royal Indian Naval Volunteer Reserve, commanding a minesweeper. He was awarded the 1939/45 Star, Burma Star, War Service Medal for his military service.

He worked in his family business, shipping and pharmaceuticals, after the Second World War ended, and during the 1950s became famous for his radio commentary on cricket, one of Pakistan’s most popular sports.

=== Cricket commentator ===
Marker was a radio cricket match commentator. His first broadcast was from the Bagh-e-Jinnah, also known as Lawrence Garden, in Lahore when India visited Pakistan on their first cricket tour in 1954. He teamed up with cricket commentator Omar Kureishi for the first time as a Radio Pakistan cricket commentator.

=== Diplomat ===
Marker worked in his family's shipping business until April 1965, when he was appointed Pakistan's High Commissioner to Ghana during the height of popularity for its independence leader Kwame Nkrumah, with concurrent accreditation to Guinea and Mali. He afterward represented Pakistan in Romania, the Soviet Union (1969 – 1972), Canada, East Germany, Japan, the United Nations Office at Geneva, West Germany, France, the United States (1986 – 1989) and finally the United Nations in New York City (1990 – 1994). Marker served as Ambassador of Pakistan continually for thirty years, in ten different capitals, and nine further concurrent accreditations.

Jamsheed Marker was able to communicate in English, French, German, Russian, Urdu and his native language Gujarati. He was appointed Ambassador to the United States in 1986 and helped negotiate the Soviet military withdrawal from Afghanistan. Marker, in his 2010 memoir "Quiet Diplomacy," described contacts with official and unofficial representatives from both the United States and the Soviet Union, where he had also been ambassador. Pakistan was playing a key role in the negotiations. He also worked closely with the Pakistani military dictator General Zia Ul-Haq as the general developed the country’s clandestine nuclear weapons program.

In 1999, he served as United Nations Secretary-General Kofi Annan's Special Representative to East Timor. Annan is reported to have hailed Marker's "empathy for both sides in the talks". The Portuguese foreign minister praised Marker's "sophisticated and calm approach" while the Indonesian foreign minister said Marker's "diplomatic skills smoothed the way whenever there was a 'snag in the negotiations'". Marker chronicled his experiences in his 2003 book "East Timor: A Memoir of the Negotiations for Independence."

The British journalist Richard Lloyd Parry, in his book In the Time of Madness, recalls Marker's words of praise for the Indonesian police and the "superb leadership" of their commander Timbul Silaien after the referendum on independence for East Timor and its bloody preamble. Within days, these same Indonesian security forces were engaged in the deportation and, in some cases, the killing of East Timorese.

Marker also served as ambassador in France, the Soviet Union, Canada, Japan, West Germany and East Germany — where he opened the Pakistani Embassy. Despite being a non-Muslim in conservative Muslim Pakistan, he was broadly respected at home and had close relationships with several leaders of the country.

Some critics say Marker was more at ease with the military rulers of the country than its civilian leaders. In his book "Cover Point" (2016), Marker remembered General Ayub Khan, Pakistan’s first military ruler, as a leader who "did give us security, law and order, good governance and economic prosperity."

Marker had little praise for civilian prime ministers like Benazir Bhutto and Nawaz Sharif, whom he regarded as financially corrupt, and he was critical of Zulfikar Ali Bhutto's iron-fisted management style while praising many of his qualities, the former prime minister and father of Ms. Bhutto, blaming him for most of his country’s ailments.

=== Teaching ===
From 1995 through 2005, Marker taught a course in "Diplomacy in International Relations" at Eckerd College in St. Petersburg, Florida, U.S.

In September 2004, Pakistani Prime Minister Shaukat Aziz named Marker as ambassador-at-large for his years of service.

In June 2011, Marker was awarded an honorary doctorate by Forman Christian College University, Lahore, at the 2011–12 Commencement. Marker received the Hilal-i-Imtiaz Award (Crescent of Excellence) from President of Pakistan Pervez Musharraf in 2003.

== Death and legacy ==
Marker was married to Arnaz Minwalla. He was previously married to Diana Faridoon Dinshaw who died in 1979 of cancer. He had two daughters with Dinshaw: Niloufer Reifler and Feroza, who died in a car crash in the US in 2001.

Jamsheed Marker died on 21 June 2018 in Karachi at the age of 95. Besides his daughter, Niloufer, from his first marriage, he is survived by his wife, Arnaz (Minwalla) Marker; and his brother, Minocher Marker (Minoo Marker).

Jamsheed Marker served as a Pakistani diplomat continually for 30 years. He "helped negotiate the withdrawal of the former Soviet military from Afghanistan" in 1988-1989. As of June 2018, this service earned him the title of 'ambassador to more countries than any other person'.

== Published works ==
- Marker, Jamsheed (2003), East Timor. A Memoir of the Negotiations for Independence, Jefferson: McFarland, ISBN 0-7864-1571-1
- Khan, Roedad; Marker, Jamsheed (1999), The American Papers. Secret and Confidential India-Pakistan-Bangladesh Documents, 1965–1973, London: OUP, ISBN 0-19-579190-8
- Marker, Jamsheed (2010), Quiet Diplomacy: Memoirs of an Ambassador of Pakistan, Karachi: Oxford University Press, ISBN 978-0-19-547779-5

Diplomatic posts
| Preceded by Ejaz Azim | Pakistan Ambassador to the United States; 1986–1989 | Succeeded by Zulfiqar Ali Khan |
| Preceded by Sardar Shah Nawaz | Pakistan Ambassador to the United Nations; 1990–1995 | Succeeded by Ahmad Kamal |
