= Zahra Wadood Fatemi =

Pakistani politician

Member of the National Assembly of Pakistan
- In office 13 August 2018 – 10 August 2023
- Constituency: Reserved seat for women
- In office 1 June 2013 – 31 May 2018
- Constituency: Reserved seat for women

Personal details
- Party: PMLN (2013-present)
- Spouse: Tariq Fatemi

Zahra Wadood Fatemi (Urdu: زہرہ ودود فاطمی) is a Pakistani politician who has been a member of the National Assembly of Pakistan from August 2018 to August 2023. Previously she was a member of the National Assembly from June 2013 to May 2018.

== Political career ==
She was elected to the National Assembly of Pakistan as a candidate of Pakistan Muslim League (N) (PML-N) on a seat reserved for women from Punjab in the 2013 Pakistani general election.

She was re-elected to the National Assembly as a candidate of PML-N on a seat reserved for women from Punjab in the 2018 Pakistani general election.

== Personal life ==
She is a social worker and is married to Tariq Fatemi.
