= Asad Majeed Khan =

31st Foreign Secretary of Pakistan

- اسد مجید خان
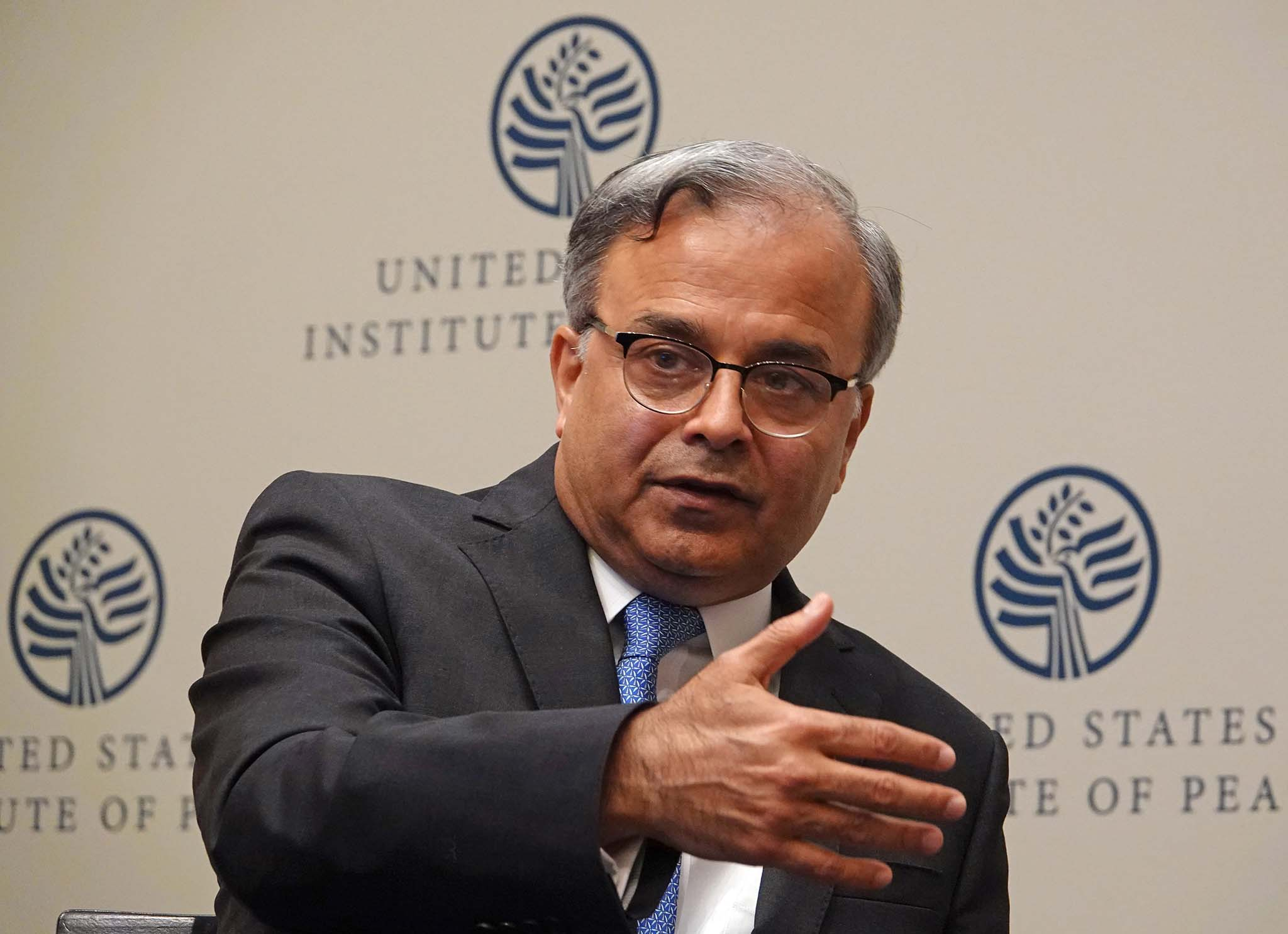

Foreign Secretary of Pakistan
- In office 2 December 2022 – 16 August 2023
- President: Arif Alvi
- Prime Minister: Anwar ul Haq Kakar
- Preceded by: Sohail Mahmood
- Succeeded by: Syrus Sajjad Qazi

Pakistan's Ambassador to United States
- In office 2019–2022
- Preceded by: Ali Jehangir Siddiqui
- Succeeded by: Masood Khan

Pakistan's Ambassador to Japan
- In office 2017–2019
- Preceded by: Farukh Amil
- Succeeded by: Imtiaz Ahmad

Personal details
- Spouse: Zunaira Khan

Asad Majeed Khan is a Pakistani diplomat who served as Pakistan's Ambassador to United States from January 2019 to 2022. He previously served as a Foreign Secretary of Pakistan and Pakistan's Ambassador to Japan (2017–19) and Pakistan's Ambassador to Belgium, Luxembourg and the European Union.

Ambassador Khan also served as Additional Foreign Secretary (Americas); Director General (Americas); Director General (West Asia); Pakistan's Charge d'Affaires ad interim to the United States; Deputy Chief of Mission at the Embassy of Pakistan, Washington, D.C.; Additional Secretary (Foreign Affairs) at the President's Secretariat; Director General (United Nations); and Minister-Counsellor at the Permanent Mission of Pakistan to the United Nations.

Ambassador Khan holds a Doctorate in International Economic and Business Law (LL.D.) from Kyushu University, Japan and has been a resource person at a number of academic institutions.

He is married and has two children.

== Cypher Case with Imran Khan ==
In 2022, Asad Majeed Khan became a key figure in a high-profile political controversy in Pakistan involving former Prime Minister Imran Khan. The controversy, known as the "Cypher Case," revolved around a diplomatic cable sent by Ambassador Khan during his tenure as Pakistan's Ambassador to the United States. The cable allegedly contained a conversation that was interpreted by Imran Khan as evidence of a foreign conspiracy to oust him from office.

Imran Khan claimed that the cypher, which he publicly disclosed during a political rally, indicated that the United States was behind a plot to remove him from power through a no-confidence vote in the National Assembly. This claim was based on the contents of the cable which reportedly conveyed a message from a senior U.S. official suggesting that Pakistan would face consequences if Imran Khan remained in office.

The release and interpretation of the cypher led to significant political turmoil in Pakistan, with debates over the validity and implications of the alleged foreign interference. Critics of Imran Khan accused him of using the cypher to create a narrative of external meddling for political gain, while his supporters viewed it as proof of a legitimate threat to Pakistan's sovereignty.

Asad Majeed Khan, who was responsible for drafting the cable, found himself at the center of the controversy. He maintained that the cable was a routine diplomatic communication and that its contents were misrepresented for political purposes. Imran Khan used the cypher for mass spreading of his narrative.The case sparked widespread debate about the role of diplomatic communications in domestic politics and the potential consequences of their misuse.

This controversy remained a topic of discussion in Pakistani politics and media, contributing to the ongoing discourse about foreign influence and political integrity in the country.
