= Civil Services Academy =

Civil service training academy in Lahore, Pakistan

Coordinates: 31.4908°N 74.3580°E

- لاہوراکادمی برائے تربیتِ دیوانی ملازمین
- Civil Service Academy logo
- Abbreviation: CSA
- Formation: 1948; 78 years ago 1972; 54 years ago (reformation)
- Type: Government organization
- Purpose: Training of newly selected civil servants
- Location: Lahore, Pakistan

Situated in Lahore, Pakistan, the Civil Services Academy Lahore (Note: Urdu: لاہوراکادمی برائے تربیتِ دیوانی ملازمین) is an academy for the training of young bureaucrats who are commissioned by the Federal Public Service Commission (FPSC) through a very competitive Central Superior Services exam, abbreviated as "CSS". On the advice of the first Governor-General of Pakistan Muhammad Ali Jinnah, it was originally established in 1948 as the Pakistan Administrative Services Academy.

With the adoption of Civil Services Pakistan Resolution, the Academy was renamed Civil Services Academy and the campus was shifted from an old building on the Race Course Road to the Old Residency Estate on Mall Road. Meanwhile, in addition to the new recruits of Civil Services of Pakistan (CSP), the academy started training the new employees of Foreign Services of Pakistan in 1963. After the creation of Bangladesh in 1971 and the consequent loss of the Police Academy of Pakistan (then situated at Rajshahi in Bangladesh), the new recruits of Police Service of Pakistan (PSP) also started training in this academy.

With the adoption of Administrative Reforms of 1973, it was decided to organize a Common Training Program (CTP) for fresh entrants to various Central Superior Services (renamed as Occupational Groups).

As a consequence the Civil Services Academy and Finance Services Academy (FSA) were merged. This Financial Services Academy was set up by the Government of Pakistan in mid 1950s for the training of new entrants of various Financial Services such as Pakistan Taxation Services (PTS), Pakistan Customs and Excise Services (PCES), Pakistan Military Accounts Service (PMAS), Pakistan Audit and Accounts Service (PAAS), and Pakistan Railway's Accounts Service (PRAS). The huge campus of Financial Services Academy was located at Walton, which was then a sparsely populated suburb of Lahore. This new entity, created out of this merger, was renamed as Academy for Administrative Training. However, this name was once again changed to Civil Services Academy by the then President of Pakistan during his visit to the Academy in 1981.

The academy has one campus at Walton (used exclusively for the Common Training Program) and another one at Mall Road (which is used for the Specialized Training Programme for Pakistan Administrative Service officers).

Previously the academy was a subordinate office and attached department of Establishment Division, Government of Pakistan but now it is an autonomous body. It now stands merged along with the four NIPAs (National Institute of Public Administration) and the PASC (Pakistan Administrative Staff College) into the National School of Public Policy (NSPP). The President of Pakistan is the chairman of the board of NSPP.

The administration of the academy is run by a director general who is usually a senior civil servant.

== See also ==
- Central Superior Services of Pakistan
- Pakistan Administrative Service
