= The Muslim Observer =

The Muslim Observer (TMO) is a weekly newspaper, founded in 1998, focussing on issues relevant to Muslims and Islam. It is based in Farmington, Michigan, United States – a publication by the parent media organization Muslim Media Network Inc..

It reaches all 50 United States and its website, muslimobserver.com, is visited by thousands of people every day. The newspaper claims to have a circulation of 20,000. The Muslim Observer (printed newspaper) is mostly distributed free of charge to the mosques and cultural centers in the community. They show 987 paid subscribers.

It has national and international correspondents, and publishes a wide variety of departments for its readers, including a children's section, a health and nutrition section, and various regional pages, including the ones for Houston, southeast Michigan, and south Florida.

== Point of view ==
The newspaper prides itself on printing news that cannot be found in mainstream papers. Thus without endorsing their views it will reprint the speeches of people under fire from and vilified by the mainstream media like Hassan Nasrallah or Moqtada Sadr — this despite the newspaper's definite disagreement with the views advocated by those people.

In addition, the paper has other editorial advocacy positions that have remained consistent over the years. Criticism of Israel for abuses is one such area. Another is 9-11 Conspiracy theory. The paper consistently reprints views that undermine the official story of 9–11.

The paper less consistently advocates the somewhat ill-considered but generally accepted American Muslim views on national and international issues, for instance attacking from early on the attempts to intervene in Darfur on the grounds that the people advocating intervention had ulterior motives (namely Sudanese oil reserves and splitting the Muslim community on the basis of ethnicity). In 2014, according to Detroit Free Press (newspaper) and the US census, there are about 210,000 Michiganders who have roots in the Middle East. The Muslim Observer hopes to further expand its circulation base in the future by increasing its readership among this ethnic population.

== History ==
The Muslim Observer is the oldest of the branches of Muslim Media Network, Inc., (MMN) which came into existence and subsumed it in 2005. MMN also contains the Muslim Media News Service, a subscription news service with national and international reporters. So far, TMO and Muslim Media News Service are the only branches of MMN.

MMN was started primarily as a vehicle for an unsuccessful initial public offering (IPO) that the company tried to go through with in 2005, but that failed to receive enough contributions to succeed. MMN was conceived by TMO publisher Dr. AS Nakadar as the umbrella organization for a family of Muslim advocacy organizations whose flagship would have been The Muslim Observer. The IPO fell through in the face of the tremendous fees associated with mandatory state and federal filing fees and huge accounting fees associated with Sarbanes-Oxley compliance. In the wake of the failed IPO, MMN has become primarily a shell organization, the logo that accompanies TMO and MMNS.

== Officers ==
Dr. Aslam Abdullah is the editor-in-chief of The Muslim Observer. He is also the director of the Islamic Society of Nevada, as well as the director of the Muslim Electorates Council of America. It has endorsed Ron Paul for the Michigan primary in Jan 2008, citing his views on the war in Iraq and the Patriot Act. However, in the same article, it states that Democratic government will be "less treacherous" than a Republican one. The article calls on the Muslim community to recognize the importance of primaries.

The newspaper relies largely on reprinted articles that are relevant to Muslims—with some bright spots like Sumayyah Meehan, a columnist who reports from Kuwait; another bright spot is Nilofar Suhrawardy, an Indian reporter who consistently reports on serious issues in India. Some good articles have been written by Adil James, in Michigan, especially one on the war in Lebanon, [Escape from Bint Jebail]. The newspaper reprints many Reuters articles and some Associated Press and AFP articles. Generally mainstream, but some of the views advocated by some articles in the paper are at the fringe.

The publisher of the newspaper is a retired Indian-American cardiologist, Dr. Abdul Raheman S. Nakadar. The newspaper faces an uncertain future, in the weak market for printed media.
