= Institute of Strategic Studies Islamabad =

Pakistani think tank on international affairs

Institute of Strategic Studies, Islamabad
- Abbreviation: ISSI
- Formation: 1973
- Headquarters: Ataturk Ave, F-5/2 F-5, Islamabad, Pakistan
- Website: https://issi.org.pk/

The Institute of Strategic Studies, Islamabad (ISSI), (دانشگاہِ برائے تحقیق و مطالعہِ عسکری حکمتِ عملی) is a strategic studies think tank based in Islamabad, Pakistan established in 1973. It is funded by the Ministry of Foreign Affairs of Pakistan. Its most famous member is the nationalist commentator Shireen Mazari. The organisation is devoted to providing an in-depth understanding and objective analysis of regional and global strategic issues, affecting international peace and security. The original name of the institute was "Pakistan Institute of Strategic Studies" (P.I.S.S). Visiting dignitaries from other countries sometimes are invited to address and speak on worldwide current issues from this organisation's platform.

In November 2017, the Japanese Ambassador Takashi Kurai gave a public talk here titled 'Japan-Pakistan Relationship: 65 Years and Beyond'. He reminded the audience that Pakistan was once the largest exporter of textiles to Japan while Japan was the largest exporter of machinery and vehicles to Pakistan. He also mentioned that then President Ayub Khan's visit to Japan was historical as the Emperor of Japan had welcomed him himself. He also said that more Pakistani textile products should be exported to Japan.

Tanvir Ahmad Khan, former Foreign Secretary (Pakistan), after his retirement, had one time served as Director General and Chairman of the Institute of Strategic Studies, Islamabad.

In 2018, Masood Khan, Pakistan's former Ambassador to the United Nations was serving as the Director General of this institute.
