= Permanent Representative of Pakistan to the United Nations =

Ambassador of Pakistan to the United Nations
- Emblem of Pakistan

- Flag of Pakistan
- Incumbent; Syed Haider Shah since 03 November 2026
- Ministry of Foreign Affairs
- Style: His Excellency Ambassador
- Residence: Manhattan, New York City
- Nominator: Prime Minister of Pakistan
- Appointer: President of Pakistan
- Term length: 3 years
- Inaugural holder: Syed Itaat Husain
- Formation: 30 September 1947; 79 years ago
- Deputy: Mohammad Aamir Khan Deputy Permanent Representative
- Website: Pakistan Mission – UN

The Permanent Representative of Pakistan to the United Nations (Urdu: اقوام متحدہ میں پاکستان کا مستقل مندوب) is Pakistan's diplomatic representative to the United Nations (UN). The permanent Representative (UN ambassador) is the head of Permanent Mission of Pakistan to the United Nations in New York, there is another Pakistani Mission based at the United Nations Office at Geneva, Switzerland.

The mission is usually headed by a career foreign service officer, but has historically been led by an eminent personalities from business, media, law and other areas and are usually political appointees. The current holder of the position is Syed Haider Shah; prominent previous holders include Munir Akram, Dr. Maleeha Lodhi, Masood Khan and Muhammad Zafarullah Khan.

== List of ambassadors ==
Name	Entered office	Left office
Syed Itaat Husain	1948	1951
Patras Bokhari	1951	1954
Prince Aly Khan	February 1958	May 1960
Muhammad Zafrullah Khan	1961	1964
Syed Amjad Ali	1964	1967
Agha Shahi	1967	1972
Iqbal Akhund	1972	1978
Niaz A. Naik	1978	1982
Sardar Shah Nawaz	1982	1989
Jamsheed Marker	September 1990	March 1995
Ahmad Kamal	March 1995	August 1999
Inam-ul-Haq	August 1999	February 2000
Shamshad Ahmad	February 2000	May 2002
Munir Akram	May 2002	September 2008
Hussain Haroon	September 2008	October 2012
Masood Khan	October 2012	January 2015
Maleeha Lodhi	February 2015	October 2019
Munir Akram	November 2019	March 2025
Asim Iftikhar Ahmad	April 2025	October 2026
Syed Haider Shah	November 2026	Incumbent
