= Foreign Service Academy =

Pakistani diplomatic training body

- اکادمیِ ملازمتِ خارجہ

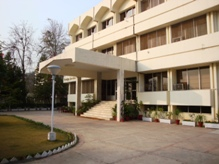
- Foreign Service Academy Islamabad Pakistan

Agency overview
- Formed: September 1981; 44 years ago
- Jurisdiction: Pakistan
- Headquarters: Islamabad, Pakistan
- Parent agency: Ministry of Foreign Affairs
- Website: www.fsa.gov.pk

The Foreign Service Academy (Urdu: اکادمیِ ملازمتِ خارجہ) in Islamabad, Pakistan is the training arm of the Ministry of Foreign Affairs of Pakistan. Since its establishment in September 1981, the academy has organized 49 courses of the Foreign Service of Pakistan out of which 20 courses included junior foreign service officers from other countries. The academy has also arranged for 21 special courses for mid-career foreign diplomats, the South Asian Association for Regional Cooperation, African and other countries, special courses for Afghan diplomats, Iraqi diplomats, and mid-career officers in the Foreign Service of Pakistan.

In 2015, Tariq Fatemi, Special Assistant to the Prime Minister, presided over the Graduation Ceremony of Foreign Service Officers at the Foreign Service Academy. He stated that the Foreign Service Academy's contributions to the country are very valuable.

== Women participation ==
After the independence of Pakistan in 1947, Begum Raana Liaquat Ali Khan became the first woman to represent Pakistan at the United Nations General Assembly in 1952. As of 2007, 11 percent of the total officers serving at the Ministry of Foreign Affairs (Pakistan) are women. Similarly Pakistan's Foreign Service Academy has been improving women's representation among its ranks.
