= Niaz Naik =

Pakistani diplomat (1926–2009)

Foreign Secretary of Pakistan Niaz A. Naik
- In office 1982–1986

Personal details
- Born: 31 May 1926
- Died: 8 August 2009 (aged 83)
- Profession: Diplomat and civil servant

Niaz A. Naik (31 May 1926 – 8 August 2009) was a Pakistani diplomat.

He served as Foreign Secretary of Pakistan from 1982 to 1986 and also served as a High Commissioner of Pakistan to India. He played a pivotal role in the back-channel talks during the 1999 Kargil War between India and Pakistan.

== Career ==
Born on 31 May 1926, Naik completed his education from Punjab University and received a master's degree. He joined the Pakistani Foreign Services in September 1949. According to a major newspaper of Pakistan, "As a foreign secretary, he played a key role in the signing of pacts with India on trade, visas and defence".

As a diplomat, Naik served in several Pakistani missions. His first posting was in Sydney where he served from 1951 to 1955, New York City from 1955 to 1959, Rangoon from 1960 to 1963, Bonn, Germany from 1963 to 1965 and Geneva from 1965 to 1967. Naik served as the Director General to the United Nations from 1967 to 1970 and as Additional Secretary General from 1974 to 1978.

From 1986 to 1990, Naik served as the permanent Representative of Pakistan to United Nations Educational, Scientific and Cultural Organization (UNESCO). Naik served as the Ambassador of Pakistan to Geneva from 1971 to 1974, New York City from 1978 to 1982 and France. Naik was also part of the UN-sponsored international contact group on Afghanistan.

=== Kargil War ===
Naik, who also served as High Commissioner to India, played a pivotal role in the back-channel talks during the 1999 Kargil War between India and Pakistan. He was also instrumental in the back-door negotiations on behalf of Pakistani Prime Minister Nawaz Sharif with R. K. Misra, an aide of then Indian Prime minister Atal Bihari Vajpayee.

== Death ==
Naik was found murdered in his house in the Pakistani capital Islamabad on August 8, 2009. A postmortem at the Pakistan Institute of Medical Sciences hospital revealed that Naik may have been tortured before he was killed. Four ribs and the jaw bone were fractured and his lungs were damaged by a sharp heavy object. His body was discovered 3 or 4 days after his murder. Naik was unmarried and lived alone in Islamabad.
