= Foreign Secretary (Pakistan) =

Administrative post of the ministry of Foreign Affairs

Foreign Secretary of Pakistan
- معتمدِ خارجہ پاکستان; Mo'tamad-ē-Xārjā Pākistān
- Incumbent; Asim Iftikhar Ahmad since 12 October 2026
- Ministry of Foreign Affairs
- Reports to: Minister of Foreign Affairs; Minister of State for Foreign Affairs
- Residence: Islamabad, Pakistan
- Nominator: Prime Minister of Pakistan
- Appointer: President of Pakistan
- Term length: 3 years
- Inaugural holder: Mohammed Ikramullah
- Formation: 1947

The Foreign Secretary of Pakistan (Urdu: معتمدِ خارجہ پاکستان, romanized: Mo'tamad-ē-Xārjā Pākistān) is the federal secretary for the Ministry of Foreign Affairs in the government of Pakistan. The Secretary, as in all other ministries of the federal government, is the bureaucratic head of the ministry, who is a BPS-22 grade officer of the Central Superior Services of Pakistan.

The current Foreign Secretary of Pakistan is Amna Baloch since September 11, 2024. Amna Baloch holds the title of being a second woman Foreign Secretary in the history of Pakistan after Tehmina Janjua.

== List of Foreign Secretaries ==
No.	Name of Foreign Secretary	Entered Office	Left Office
1	Mohammed Ikramullah	15 August 1947	16 October 1951
2	Mirza Osman Ali Baig	16 October 1951	30 November 1952
3	Akhtar Hussain	1 December 1952	4 June 1953
4	J.A. Rahim	4 June 1953	11 January 1955
5	Sikandar Ali Baig	10 October 1955	30 June 1959
6	Mohammed Ikramullah	1 July 1959	11 May 1961
7	S.K. Dehlavi	12 May 1961	26 July 1963
8	Aziz Ahmed	26 July 1963	23 June 1966
9	S.M. Yusuf	24 June 1966	1 July 1970
10	Sultan Mohammed Khan	1 July 1970	31 March 1972
11	Iftikhar Ali	31 March 1972	1 January 1973
12	Mumtaz Ali Alvie	1 January 1973	7 May 1973
13	Agha Shahi	6 July 1973	6 July 1977
14	Sardar Shah Nawaz	6 July 1977	29 May 1980
15	Riaz Piracha	29 May 1980	10 July 1982
16	Niaz A. Naik	11 July 1982	30 May 1986
17	Abdul Sattar	31 May 1986	2 August 1988
18	Humayun Khan	3 August 1988	22 February 1989
19	Tanvir Ahmad Khan	30 December 1989	30 August 1990
20	Shahryar Khan	30 August 1990	29 March 1994
21	Najmuddin Shaikh	30 April 1994	24 February 1997
22	Shamshad Ahmad	25 February 1997	17 February 2000
23	Inam-ul-Haq	17 February 2000	21 June 2002
24	Riaz Khokhar	6 August 2002	14 February 2005
25	Riaz Mohammad Khan	15 February 2005	25 April 2008
26	Salman Bashir	3 May 2008	3 March 2012
27	Jalil Abbas Jilani	3 March 2012	December 2013
28	Aizaz Ahmad Chaudhry	December 2013	February 2017
29	Tehmina Janjua	February 2017	April 2019
30	Sohail Mahmood	April 2019	2 December 2022
31	Asad Majeed Khan	2 December 2022	16 August 2023
32	Syrus Sajjad Qazi	16 August 2023	10 September 2024
33	Amna Baloch	11 September 2024	17 September 2026
34	Asim Iftikhar Ahmad	12 October 2026	Incumbent

== See also ==
- Cabinet Secretary of Pakistan
- Establishment Secretary of Pakistan
- Aviation Secretary of Pakistan
- Commerce Secretary of Pakistan
- Foreign relations of Pakistan
- Ministry of Foreign Affairs (Pakistan)
- Minister of Foreign Affairs (Pakistan)
