= Foreign Service of Pakistan =

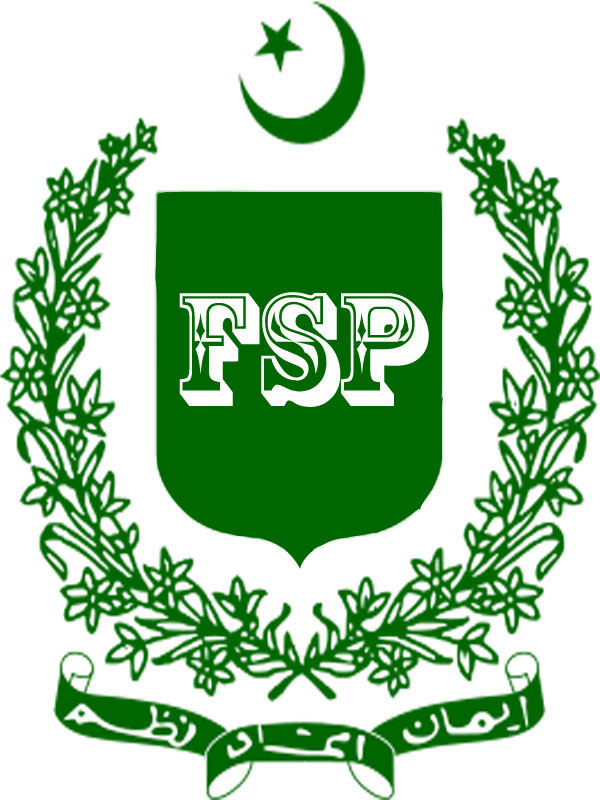
- Foreign Service of Pakistan

Service Overview
| Establishment | 1948 |
| Country | Pakistan |
| Training Ground | Foreign Service Academy (FSA) Islamabad |
| Controlling Authority | Ministry of Foreign Affairs (Pakistan) |
| Cadre Size | Posts |
| Colour | White and Green |
| Foreign Secretary | Sohail Mahmood |
| Website | Official Site |

The Foreign Service of Pakistan (Urdu: ملازمتِ خارجہ پاکستان) is part of the Central Superior Services of Pakistan. It was formally created in October 1952, after having been an improvised organization since the creation and independence of Pakistan in 1947. Its old name was Foreign Service of India working within the Indian Civil Service (British India) before 1947. After 1947, its recruitment and hiring of employees is done through the larger organization Civil Service of Pakistan. Chaudhry Sir Muhammad Zafarullah Khan (Urdu: محمد ظفر اللہ خان; 6 February 1893 – 1 September 1985) was a Pakistani jurist and diplomat who served as the first Foreign Minister of Pakistan. After serving as foreign minister he continued his international career and is the only Pakistani to preside over the International Court of Justice. He also served as the President of the UN General Assembly. He is the only person to date to serve as the President of both UN General Assembly and the International Court of Justice.

== History ==
Foreign Service of Pakistan was constituted on an ad hoc basis immediately on the birth of Pakistan. The Service was first given an executive fiat in a decision of the Federal Cabinet in July 1948. A formal resolution constituting the service was announced in October 1952. It envisaged diplomatic posts in the Ministry of Foreign Affairs and in the Diplomatic and consular missions of Pakistan abroad. The resolution provided for the posts of (a) Secretary (1), (b) Joint Secretaries (2), (c) Deputy Secretaries (8), and (d) Under Secretaries (16). Posts for Pakistan Diplomatic Missions abroad provided for Ambassadors (17), High Commissioners (5), Ministers (4), Commissioners (1), Deputy High Commissioners (2), Counselors (15), First Secretaries (10), Second Secretaries (19), Third Secretaries (31), Consul General (3), Consul (4), and Vice Consul (7).

Between 1952 and 1960, the cadre strength was constantly kept under review and was enlarged by executive orders in view of the expanding requirements. However, shortage of personnel continued to plague the service. The total strength of the officers gradually increased both at the Headquarters and the Missions. In 1972, the total strength of the officers at the Headquarters and the Missions grew to 323. At present there are 403 officers both at the Headquarters and in our Missions.

The entry into the former Foreign Service of Pakistan through examination began in 1948. The Recruitment to the Officers cadre (Foreign Service of Pakistan) is through the competitive examination conducted annually by the Federal Public Service Commission (FPSC) of Pakistan. Foreign Service of Pakistan is among the top three groups along with Pakistan Administrative Service and Police Service of Pakistan. The Establishment Division in consultation with the Ministry of Foreign Affairs announces annually the number of vacancies of officers in the Foreign Affairs Group, which vary from year to year. Officers of the Foreign Service of Pakistan undergo common training at the Civil Services Academy, Lahore and later are given six months specialized training at the Foreign Service Academy, Islamabad. The officers also undergo language learning trainings at various prestigious universities/institutions abroad to learn different languages including Arabic, French, German, Chinese, Spanish, Korean, Portuguese, Russian, Japanese etc. Fully funded Language scholarships offered by other countries are also availed. The Ministry thus has a rich reservoir of officers who are well versed in different languages. Foreign Service of Pakistan is a cadre that runs the Ministry of Foreign Affairs (Pakistan) as well as Pakistan's Embassies/High Commissions/Consulates in other countries of the world.

== Ranks ==
After the initial training period at the Foreign Service Academy, Islamabad, junior officers join the Ministry of Foreign Affairs, Islamabad and serve in the political, administrative or special protocol wings under various divisions of the Ministry. Or rather begin their diplomatic careers abroad. Rise in ranks at headquarters, divisions and missions are:

Headquarters (Foreign Office):

• Assistant Director (BPS-17)

• Deputy Director (BPS-18)

• Director (BPS-19)

• Director General (BPS-20)

• Additional Foreign Secretary (BPS-21)

• Foreign Secretary (head of Deptt.) (BPS-22)

Divisions (Foreign Programme/Relation Sectors):

• Assistant Commissioner/Additional Assistant Commissioner (BSP-17)

• Deputy Commissioner/Additional Deputy Commissioner (BSP-18)

• Commissioner/Additional Commissioner (BSP-19)

• Chief Commissioner/Director General/Additional Director General (BSP-20)

• Additional Foreign Secretary (head of Deptt.) (BSP-21)

Note: In divisions, the highest rank is the Additional Foreign Secretary, who are responsible for over all looking each divisions of the Ministry of Foreign Affairs as assigned by the Foreign Minister.

Missions Abroad (Embassy/High Commission):

• Third Secretary/Vice Consul (BS-17)

• Second Secretary/Consul (BS-18)

• First Secretary/Deputy Consul General (BS-19)

• Consul General/Ambassador/High Commissioner Trivial Areas (BS-20)

• Ambassador/High Commissioner Important Areas (BS-21)

Note: Consuls General and other envoys toward low political profile missions and are lower by virtue of rank as well and can be compared with DGs. Ambassadors and High Commissioners toward high profile nations however rank higher and are Special Secretaries; equivalent of administrative Additional Secretaries in national headquarters.

Envoy of one Commonwealth country to another is termed High Commissioner.

== Progress of women as diplomats ==
As a result of Administrative Reforms of 1972 under Zulfiqar Ali Bhutto regime, Foreign Service of Pakistan was opened even much more to women in Pakistan after 1973.

Here are some of the distinguished women diplomats:

- Begum Rana Liaquat Ali Khan (Ambassador to Netherlands) (1954 – 1961)
- Hina Rabbani Khar (Served as the top diplomat in Foreign Service of Pakistan, Foreign Minister of Pakistan) (2011 – 2013)
- Sherry Rehman (Ambassador to the United States) (2011 – 2013)
- Tehmina Janjua (First Woman Foreign Secretary) (February 2017 to April 2019)
- Maleeha Lodhi (Ambassador to the United Nations) (2015 – 2019)

== See also ==
- Civil Service of Pakistan or a more formal name is Central Superior Services for the same organisation
- Federal Public Service Commission of Pakistan
- Ministry of Foreign Affairs (Pakistan)
