= Ministry of Foreign Affairs (Pakistan) =

Federal government ministry of Pakistan

- وزارتِ خارجہ; Wazārat-ē-Xārjā
- Branch of Government of Pakistan

- Ministry of Foreign Affairs of the Government of Pakistan

Agency overview
- Formed: August 14, 1947; 79 years ago
- Jurisdiction: Government of Pakistan
- Headquarters: Ministry of Foreign Affairs Headquarters Constitution Avenue, Red Zone, Islamabad; 33°43′06.28″N 73°06′12.19″E
- Minister responsible: Ishaq Dar
- Agency executives: Amna Baloch, Foreign Secretary of Pakistan; Sajjad Haider Khan, Spokesperson
- Website: www.mofa.gov.pk

The Ministry of Foreign Affairs (abbreviated as MoFA; Urdu: وزارتِ خارجہ, romanized: Wazārat-ē-Xārjā) is a ministry of the Government of Pakistan tasked in managing Pakistan's diplomatic and consular relations as well as its foreign policy. Headed by the Minister of Foreign Affairs, the ministry is also responsible for maintaining Pakistani governmental offices and missions abroad with diplomatic and consular status.

== Minister ==
The Minister of Foreign Affairs is Cabinet member who responsible maintaining Pakistan's foreign policy as well as its diplomatic missions abroad. Muhammad Ishaq Dar is the current Minister of Foreign Affairs.

== Divisions ==
- Afghanistan, Iran & Turkey & West Asia Division
- Africa Division
- Americas Division
- China & SCO Division
- CAR & ECO Division
- East Asia & Pacific Division
- Europe Division
- Middle East Division
- South Asia Division
- United Nations Division
- Counter Terrorism Division
- Audit & Consular Affairs
- Arms Control & Disarmament
- Economic Coordination & Organization of Islamic Cooperation
- Finance Division
- Legal & Treaties Wing
- Strategic Export Control Division
- Spokesperson Division
- Policy Planning & Research
- Press Information Office

== Departments ==
- Foreign Service of Pakistan
  - Foreign Service Academy
- Institute of Strategic Studies
- Institute of Regional Studies

== See also ==
- Government of Pakistan
- Politics of Pakistan
- List of diplomatic missions in Pakistan
- Foreign relations of Pakistan
- Pakistani diplomatic missions
- List of diplomatic visits to Pakistan since 2024
