= Full spectrum deterrence =

Military doctrine of Pakistan

The Full spectrum deterrence (previously known as Minimum Credible Deterrence (MCD; officially named N-deterrence)) is the defence and strategic principle on which the atomic weapons programme of Pakistan is based. This doctrine is not a part of the nuclear doctrine, which is designed for the use of the atomic weapons in a full-scale declared war if the conditions of the doctrine are surpassed. Instead, the policy of the Minimum Credible Deterrence falls under minimal deterrence as an inverse to mutually assured destruction (MAD), which is widely regarded as designed to dissuade its enemies, specifically India, from taking any military actions against Pakistan. Pakistan refuses to adopt No first use policy, while the other regional powers, India and China, have adopted the policy. Pakistan's foreign minister Shamshad Ahmad had warned that if Pakistan is ever invaded or attacked, it will use "any weapon in its arsenal" to defend itself.

== Developmental history ==
The comprehensive nuclear weapons policy was addressed by populist prime minister Zulfikar Ali Bhutto in a vision for the country to "walk tall" in global politics. Maintaining equality on every level of scientific development with India was a primary motivation for his government. Domestically, the popular support helped Bhutto to consolidate the political and economical aspects of atomic bomb projects and the control of the Pakistan military in civilian hands. This led the creation of formation of defence mechanism systematic programmes, known as National Command Authority (NCA), Joint Special Forces (JSF) under the control of the Joint Chiefs of Staff Committee which is led by its designated Chairman. Externally, the nuclear status was a way to boost Pakistan's prestige, importance and influence on among the friendly and Muslim nations, including rich Gulf monarchies.

On 20 May 1999, in his address at the National Defence University (NDU), Prime minister Nawaz Sharif used the term "minimum credible deterrence" while speaking about Pakistan's nuclear stance. There, the Prime minister (even the government at present now), made cleared Pakistan's nuclear declaratory statements that India is regarded as its sole nuclear adversary and thus the focus of its nuclear deterrent.

The MCD theory is based on the principles of the deterrence theory and offers the idea of the achieving the second strike capability. The MCD theory is effectively, an ideal form of the Nash equilibrium (named after mathematician John Forbes Nash), in which both India and Pakistan, once armed, have no rational incentive to either initiate a conflict, or to disarm.

== Promulgation and enforcement ==
The policy framework was announced by Prime minister of Pakistan (at that time) Nawaz Sharif after ordering to perform country's first atomic tests (see the operations: Chagai-I and Chagai-II) in 1998 as part of tit-for-tat policy. In end of 1998, the doctrine and organisation began to be redesigned, and a proceeded to a full-scope scientific, economical and defence review, involving key country's institutions, to develop and test ideas and concepts. The studies and policy were studied at the National Defence University (NDU), National University of Sciences and Technology, Institute of Defence and Strategic Studies (IDSS) and various others.

Since the public atomic tests in 1998, Pakistan Government has adopted considerable recommendations and suggestions to think through its nuclear doctrine, and to integrate the nuclear power dimension into its defence strategy. The definition of potential thresholds has been refined, at least in public statements by Pakistani officials. According to one reliable source, the country adopted a three-point nuclear policy in early 2001 as part of the minimum credible deterrence. The most authoritative of these statements are provided by the officials of the Atomic Command Authority, in the form of four thresholds which were first mentioned by Khalid Kidwai in late 2001.

== Policy statements ==
The theory of "Minimum Credible Deterrence (MCD)" has been variously interpreted by the different governments of Pakistan. Although the MCD theory was only officially adopted in 1998 as part of Pakistan's defence theory, it has been applied by the government since 1972. On military perspective, for instance, the Pakistan Air Force (PAF), has retrospectively contended that "While MCD is not about entering into a "nuclear race", but to follow a policy of "peaceful co-existence" in the region, it cannot remain oblivious to the developments in South Asia." Pakistan Government officials have repeatedly emphasized that MCD is a defence theory, a doctrine that is based on maintaining a balance to safeguard its sovereignty and ensure peace in the region.

In 1974, Bhutto launched a more aggressive and serious diplomatic offensive on the United States and the Western world over the nuclear issues. Writing to the world and Western leaders, Bhutto made it clear and maintained:

Pakistan was exposed to a kind of "nuclear threat and blackmail" unparalleled elsewhere..... (...)... If the world's community failed to provide political insurance to Pakistan and other countries against the nuclear blackmail, these countries would be forced to launch atomic bomb programs of their own!... [A]ssurances provided by the United Nations were not "Enough!...

— Zulfikar Ali Bhutto, statement written in "Eating Grass", source

If Pakistan restricts or suspends her nuclear deterrence, it would not only enable India to blackmail Pakistan with her nuclear advantage, but would impose a crippling limitation on the development of Pakistan's science and technology....

— Zulfikar Ali Bhutto, 1969, source

Pakistan's strategy of "minimum credible deterrence" guarantees "peace in the region", and the nuclear weapons programme is moving "strength to strength"...

— Prime Minister Shaukat Aziz, Times of India,

The People of Pakistan are "security conscious" because of the (1971) severe trauma, and the three wars with (India). Our nuclear development was peaceful... but was "an effective deterrence to India"..... because (New Delhi) had detonated a nuclear device. She, Pakistan,...., thus, had to take every step to ensure its territorial integrity and sovereignty.....

— Benazir Bhutto, Prime minister, Benazir Bhutto on Pakistan's nuclear weapons, source

No matter whether we are recognized as "nuclear weapon-state or not, we are a Nuclear power. "Nuclear restraint", stabilization and "minimum credible deterrence" constitute the basic elements of Pakistan's nuclear policy.,..

— Nawaz Sharif, 1998, source

Pakistan does not harbour any aggressive designs against any state, but it is determined to defend its territorial integrity.... That is why we need to maintain a balance in conventional forces suitably backed by minimum credible deterrence. Pakistan will continue to "develop her military potential that guarantees peace with honour and dignity". "Our military capability is basically for the deterrence purpose while peace remains the ultimate cherished goal for Pakistan..."

— Yousaf Raza Gillani, describing the official nuclear weapons policy statement in 2012, source

== Rationale and persuasion ==
Senior officials, economists, game theorists, and strategists affiliated with Pakistan's government have argued multiple times for maintaining the Minimum Credible Deterrence. Government officials point out that the "Indo-US nuclear deal as well as cooperation in the field of conventional weapons is likely to increase India's military advantage, thus providing an arms race in the region". Therefore, maintaining "minimum credible nuclear deterrence" would require Pakistan to review its nuclear policy. The government officials maintained that while Pakistan will continue to act with responsibility, avoiding an arms race, it will not remain oblivious to the imperative of maintaining "minimum credible nuclear deterrence".

An unnamed official at the Islamabad Policy Research Institute (IPRI) stated that "the nuclear weapons programme has been exclusively driven by security considerations to ensure the survival and very existence of the state". In 2012, Prime minister Yousaf Raza Gillani stated the comprehensive policy and quoted:

The State of Pakistan does not harbour any aggressive designs against any state, but it is determined to defend its territorial integrity. That is why, we need to maintain a balance in conventional forces suitably backed by minimum credible deterrence.... She (Pakistan) will continue to "develop her potential military deterrence that guarantees peace with honour and dignity....

— Yousaf Raza Gillani, Prime minister of Pakistan (2008-2012), source

In 2010, a high ranking science minister of Pakistan publicly announced at the international conference on science after delegating foreign ambassadors and scientists from all over the world: "Our nuclear capability is purely for defensive purposes, first believing in peaceful co-existence and reconciliation and will always strive for peace and prosperity in our region".

== See also ==
- Nuclear doctrine of Pakistan
- Zulfikar Ali Bhutto
- Nawaz Sharif
- Indo-Pakistani war of 1971
- Pakistan and weapons of mass destruction
- Nuclear strategy
- Peaceful coexistence

== Concept bibliography ==
- Bhutto, Zulfikar Ali (15 April 1969). The Myth of Independence. United Kingdom: Oxford University Press. pp. 200. ISBN 978-0192151674.

== Credited scholarly articles ==
- Haq, PhD (Economics), Professor Mahbub (27 June 1998). "The Nuclear Race in South Asia". Dr. Professor Mahbub-ul-Haq, Professor of Economics at Karachi University. This was the last public address of Dr. Haq at the North South Roundtable Conference in Easton, Maryland on 27 June 1998. ""Why Pakistan reacted with nuclear test explosions, for it is an indictment of the lack of a Western strategy, not an indictment of Pakistan's irresponsibility. After India's nuclear tests in early May, Prime Minister Nawaz Sharif and the Pakistan armed forces debated whether or not to conduct their own nuclear tests and I am convinced they were resolved not to test as long as they could be provided with the right security assurances...."
- Shaikh, M. N. "Credible nuclear deterrence and doctrine for Pakistan". M. N. Shaikh, University of Calgary, Alberta, Canada.
