= Nuclear weapons debate =

Controversies surrounding nuclear weapons

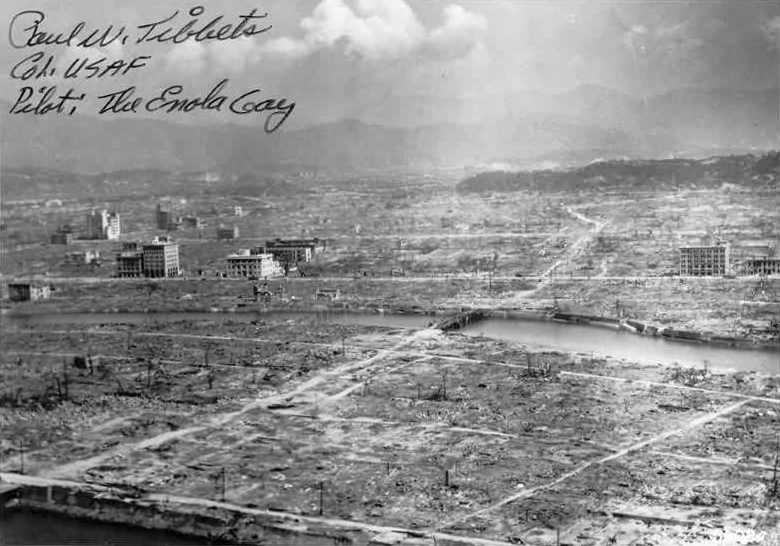
Since the atomic bombings of Hiroshima and Nagasaki, nuclear weapons have remained highly controversial and contentious objects in the forum of public debate.

The nuclear weapons debate refers to the controversies surrounding the threat, use and stockpiling of nuclear weapons. Even before the first nuclear weapons had been developed, scientists involved with the Manhattan Project were divided over the use of the weapon. The only time nuclear weapons have been used in warfare was during the final stages of World War II when USAAF B-29 Superfortress bombers dropped atomic bombs on the Japanese cities of Hiroshima and Nagasaki in early August 1945. The role of the bombings in Japan's surrender and the U.S.'s ethical justification for them have been the subject of scholarly and popular debate for decades.

Nuclear disarmament refers both to the act of reducing or eliminating nuclear weapons and to the end state of a nuclear-free world. Proponents of disarmament typically condemn a priori the threat or use of nuclear weapons as immoral and argue that only total disarmament can eliminate the possibility of nuclear war. Critics of nuclear disarmament say that it would undermine deterrence and make conventional wars more likely, more destructive, or both. The debate becomes considerably complex when considering various scenarios for example, total vs partial or unilateral vs multilateral disarmament.

Nuclear proliferation is a related concern, which most commonly refers to the spread of nuclear weapons to additional countries and increases the risks of nuclear war arising from regional conflicts. The diffusion of nuclear technologies, especially the nuclear fuel cycle technologies for producing weapons-usable nuclear materials such as highly enriched uranium and plutonium, contributes to the risk of nuclear proliferation. These forms of proliferation are sometimes referred to as horizontal proliferation to distinguish them from vertical proliferation, the expansion of nuclear stockpiles of established nuclear powers.

== History ==
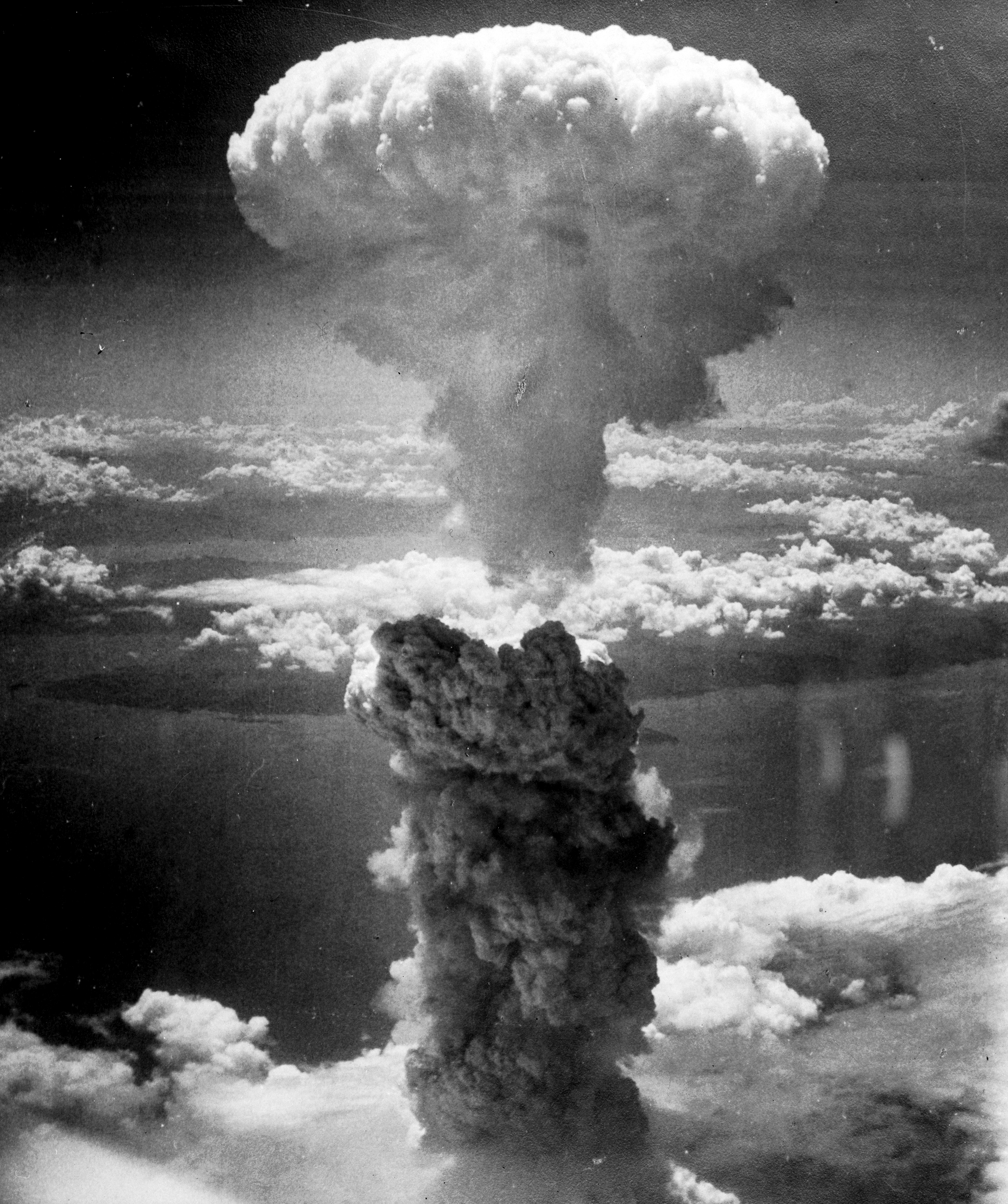
The Fat Man mushroom cloud resulting from the nuclear explosion over Nagasaki.

=== Manhattan Project ===
Because the Manhattan Project was considered to be "top secret," there was no public discussion of the use of nuclear arms, and even within the US government, knowledge of the bomb was extremely limited. However, even before the first nuclear weapons had been developed, scientists involved with the Manhattan Project were divided over the use of the weapon.

==== Franck Report ====
On June 2, 1945, Arthur Compton, the leader of the Manhattan Project's Metallurgical Laboratory, also known as Met Lab, at the University of Chicago briefed his staff on the latest information from the Interim Committee, which was formulating plans for the use of the atomic bomb to force Japanese capitulation. In response to the briefing, Met Lab's Committee on the Social and Political Implications of the Atomic Bomb, chaired by James Franck, wrote the Franck Report. The report, to which Leo Szilárd and Glenn T. Seaborg also contributed, argued that instead of being used against a city, the first atomic bomb should be "demonstrated" to the Japanese on an uninhabited area. The recommendation was not agreed with by the military commanders, the Los Alamos Target Committee (made up of other scientists), or the politicians who had input into the use of the weapon.

The report also argued that to preclude a nuclear arms race and a destabilized world order, the existence of the weapon should be made public so that a collaborative, international body could come to control atomic power:

"From this point of view a demonstration of the new weapon may best be made before the eyes of representatives of all United Nations, on the desert or a barren island. The best possible atmosphere for the achievement of an international agreement could be achieved if America would be able to say to the world, “You see what weapon we had but did not use. We are ready to renounce its use in the future and to join other nations in working out adequate supervision of the use of this nuclear weapon.” - The Franck Report

==== Szilárd Petition ====
70 scientists involved in the Manhattan Project, many of them from Met Lab, represented in part by Leó Szilárd, put forth a petition to President Harry Truman in July 1945. The Szilárd Petition urged Truman to use the atomic bomb only if the full terms of surrender were made public and if Japan, in full possession of the facts, still refused to surrender.

"We, the undersigned, respectfully petition: first, that you exercise your power as Commander-in-Chief, to rule that the United States shall not resort to the use of atomic bombs in this war unless the terms which will be imposed upon Japan have been made public in detail and Japan knowing these terms has refused to surrender; second, that in such an event the question whether or not to use atomic bombs be decided by you in the light of the considerations presented in this petition as well as all the other moral responsibilities which are involved." - The Szilárd Petition

The petition also warned Truman to consider the future implications of the decision to use the atomic bomb, including the probability of a rapid nuclear arms race and a decline in global security, and pleaded with him to prevent such an eventuality if possible.

=== Hiroshima and Nagasaki ===
The Little Boy atomic bomb was detonated over the Japanese city of Hiroshima on 6 August 1945. Exploding with a yield equivalent to 12,500 tonnes of TNT, the blast and thermal wave of the bomb destroyed nearly 50,000 buildings (including the headquarters of the 2nd General Army and Fifth Division) and killed approximately 75,000 people, among them 20,000 Japanese soldiers and 20,000 Koreans. Detonation of the "Fat Man" atomic bomb exploded over the Japanese city of Nagasaki three days later on 9 August 1945, destroying 60% of the city and killing approximately 35,000 people, among them 23,200-28,200 Japanese civilian munitions workers and 150 Japanese soldiers. The role of the bombings in Japan's surrender and the U.S.'s ethical justification for them has been the subject of scholarly and popular debate for decades. J. Samuel Walker suggests that "the controversy over the use of the bomb seems certain to continue".

=== Postwar ===
After the bombings of Hiroshima and Nagasaki, the world’s nuclear weapons stockpiles grew, and nuclear weapons have been detonated on over two thousand occasions for testing and demonstration purposes. Countries known to have detonated nuclear weapons and that acknowledge possessing such weapons are (chronologically) the United States, the Soviet Union (succeeded as a nuclear power by Russia), the United Kingdom, France, China, India, Pakistan, and North Korea.

In the early 1980s, a revival of the nuclear arms race caused a popular nuclear disarmament movement to emerge. In October 1981 500,000 people took to the streets in several cities in Italy, more than 250,000 people protested in Bonn, 250,000 demonstrated in London, and 100,000 marched in Brussels. The largest anti-nuclear protest was held on June 12, 1982, when one million people demonstrated in New York City against nuclear weapons. In October 1983, nearly 3 million people across western Europe protested nuclear missile deployments and demanded an end to the arms race.

== Arguments ==
Under the scenario of total multilateral disarmament, there is no possibility of nuclear war. Under scenarios of partial disarmament, there is a disagreement as to how the probability of nuclear war would change. Critics of nuclear disarmament say that it would undermine the ability of governments to threaten sufficient retaliation upon an attack to deter aggression against them. Application of game theory to questions of strategic nuclear warfare during the Cold War resulted in the doctrine of mutually assured destruction (MAD), a concept developed by Robert McNamara and others in the mid-1960s. Its success in averting nuclear war was theorized to depend upon the "readiness at any time before, during, or after an attack to destroy the adversary as a functioning society." Those who believe governments that should develop or maintain nuclear-strike capability usually justify their position with reference to the Cold War, claiming that a "nuclear peace" was the result of both the US and the USSR possessing mutual second-strike retaliation capability. Since the end of the Cold War, theories of deterrence in international relations have been further developed and generalized in the concept of the stability–instability paradox Proponents of disarmament call into question the assumption that political leaders are rational actors who place the protection of their citizens above other considerations, and highlight, as McNamara himself later acknowledged with the benefit of hindsight, the non-rational choices, chance, and contingency, which played a significant role in averting nuclear war, such as during the Cuban Missile Crisis of 1962 and the Able Archer 83 crisis of 1983. Thus, they argue that evidence trumps theory and deterrence theories cannot be reconciled with the historical record.

Kenneth Waltz argues in favor of the continued proliferation of nuclear weapons. In the July 2012 issue of Foreign Affairs Waltz took issue with the view of most US, European, and Israeli commentators and policymakers that a nuclear-armed Iran would be unacceptable. Instead, Waltz argues that it would probably be the best possible outcome by restoring stability to the Middle East since it would balance the Israeli regional monopoly on nuclear weapons. Professor John Mueller of Ohio State University, author of Atomic Obsession has also dismissed the need to interfere with Iran's nuclear program and expressed that arms control measures are counterproductive. During a 2010 lecture at the University of Missouri, which was broadcast by C-Span, Dr. Mueller also argued that the threat from nuclear weapons, including that from terrorists, has been exaggerated in the popular media and by officials.

In contrast, various American government officials, including Henry Kissinger, George Shultz, Sam Nunn, and William Perry, who were in office during the Cold War period, now advocate the elimination of nuclear weapons in the belief that the doctrine of mutual Soviet-American deterrence is obsolete and that reliance on nuclear weapons for deterrence is increasingly hazardous and decreasingly effective ever since the Cold War ended. A 2011 article in The Economist argued, along similar lines, that risks are more acute in rivalries between relatively-new nuclear states that lack the "security safeguards" developed by the Americans and the Soviets and that additional risks are posed by the emergence of pariah states, such as North Korea (possibly soon to be joined by Iran), armed with nuclear weapons as well as the declared ambition of terrorists to steal, buy, or build a nuclear device.

== See also ==
- Comprehensive Nuclear-Test-Ban Treaty
- Debate over the atomic bombings of Hiroshima and Nagasaki
- Global catastrophic risk
- International Day for the Total Elimination of Nuclear Weapons
- List of nuclear weapons
- No first use
- Nth Country Experiment
- Nuclear Tipping Point
- Nuclear taboo
- Three Non-Nuclear Principles, of Japan
- Uranium mining debate
