= Tannenwald =

Tannenwald is a surname. Notable people with the surname include:

- Nina Tannenwald, American political scientist
- Theodore Tannenwald Jr. (1916–1999), American judge
