= Stability–instability paradox =

International relations theory

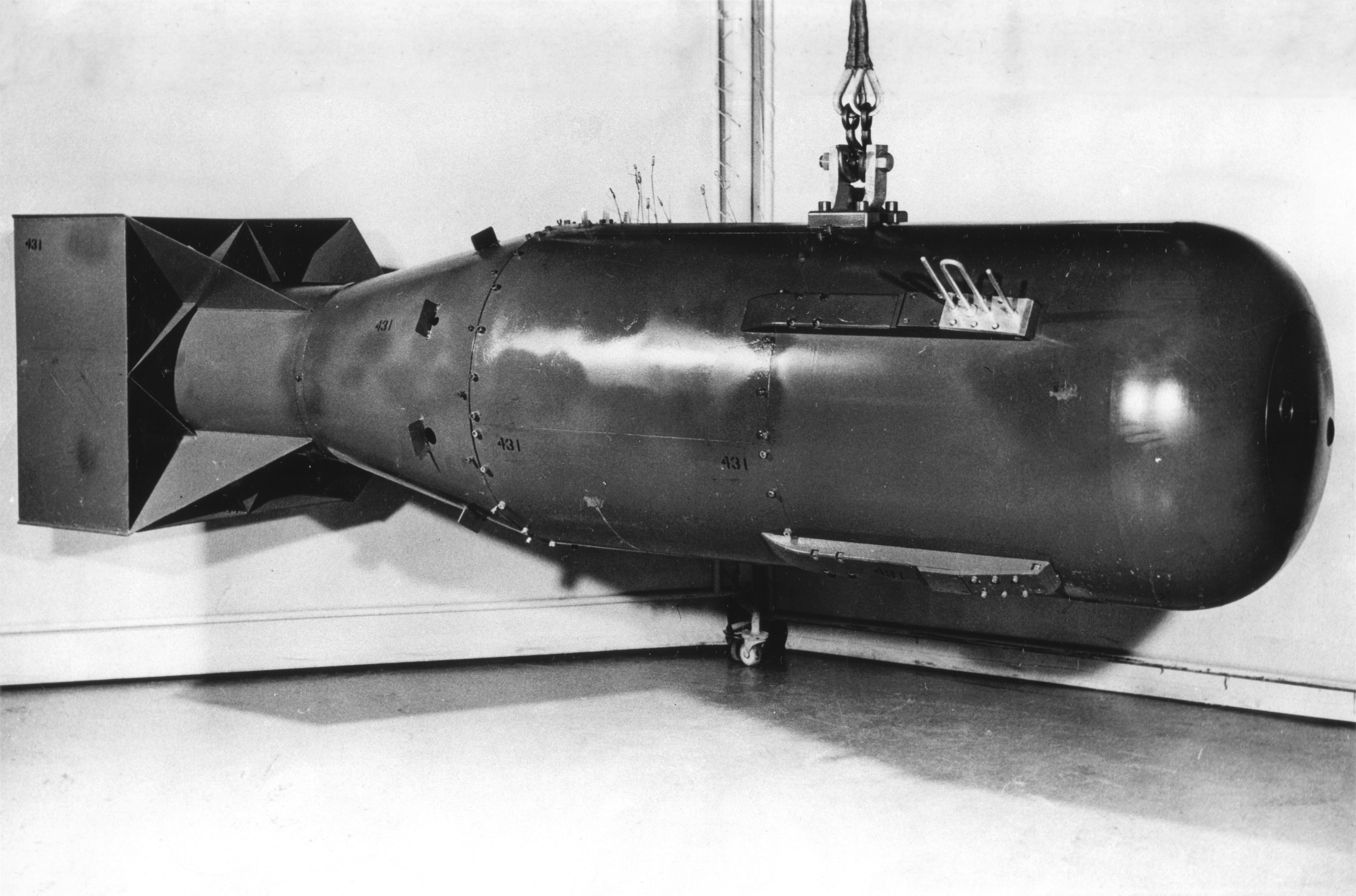
Little Boy atomic bomb, the same type of weapon dropped on Hiroshima, Japan, in August 1945.

The stability–instability paradox is an international relations theory first developed by Glenn Snyder regarding the effect of nuclear weapons and mutually assured destruction. It states that when two countries each have nuclear weapons, the probability of a direct war between them greatly decreases, but the probability of minor or indirect conflicts between them increases. This occurs because rational actors want to avoid nuclear wars, and thus they neither start major conflicts nor allow minor conflicts to escalate into major conflicts—thus making it safe to engage in minor conflicts. For instance, during the Cold War the United States and the Soviet Union never engaged each other in warfare, but fought proxy wars in Korea, Vietnam, Angola, the Middle East, Nicaragua and Afghanistan and spent substantial amounts of money and manpower on gaining relative influence over the third world.

A study published in the Journal of Conflict Resolution in 2009 quantitatively evaluated the nuclear peace hypothesis, and found support for the existence of the stability–instability paradox. The study determined that while nuclear weapons promote strategic stability, and prevent large scale wars, they simultaneously allow for more lower intensity conflicts. When one state has nuclear weapons, but their opponent does not, there is a greater chance of war. In contrast, when there is mutual nuclear weapon ownership with both states possessing nuclear weapons, the odds of war drop precipitously.

This effect can be seen in the India–Pakistan relationship and to some degree in Russia–NATO relations.

== Mechanism ==
The stability–instability paradox:

"posits that both parties to a conflict will rationally view strategic conflict and the attendant risk of a strategic nuclear exchange as untenable, and will thus avoid any escalation of sub-strategic conflicts to the strategic level. This effective “cap” on sub-strategic militarized conflict escalation emboldens states to engage in such conflict with the confidence that it would not spiral out of control and threaten their strategic interests. The causal force of this theory of increased sub-strategic conflict is the mutual recognition of the untenability of conflict at the level of strategic interests—a product of MAD [Mutually Assured Destruction]. With strategic interests forming the “red line” neither side would dare to cross, both sides are free to pursue sub-strategic political objectives through militarized conflict without the fear that the terms of such conflict will escalate beyond their control and jeopardize their strategic interests. Effectively, with the risk of uncontrolled escalation removed, the net costs to engage in conflict are reduced."

== See also ==
- Nuclear peace
- Minimal deterrence
- Deterrence theory
