= Minimal deterrence =

Minimum weapons needed to deter an adversary

In nuclear strategy, minimal deterrence, also known as minimum deterrence and finite deterrence, is an application of deterrence theory in which a state possesses no more nuclear weapons than is necessary to deter an adversary from attacking. Pure minimal deterrence is a doctrine of no first use, holding that the only mission of nuclear weapons is to deter a nuclear adversary by making the cost of a first strike unacceptably high. To present a credible deterrent, there must be the assurance that any attack would trigger a retaliatory strike. In other words, minimal deterrence requires rejecting a counterforce strategy in favor of pursuing survivable force that can be used in a countervalue second strike.

While the United States and the Soviet Union each developed robust first- and second-strike capabilities during the Cold War, the People's Republic of China pursued a doctrine of minimal nuclear deterrence. Assuming that decision-makers make cost-benefit analyses when deciding to use force, China's doctrine calls for acquiring a nuclear arsenal only large enough to destroy an adversary's "strategic points" in such a way that the expected costs of a first strike outweigh the anticipated benefits. India has also adopted this strategy, which they term Minimum Credible Deterrence.

The "minimum credible deterrence" (also known as N-deterrence) policy of Pakistan is a defence and strategic principle on which the country's nuclear weapons program is based. This doctrine is not a part of the nuclear doctrine, which is designed for the use of the atomic weapons in a full-scale declared war if the conditions of the doctrine are surpassed. Instead, the policy of the Minimum Credible Deterrence falls under minimal deterrence as an inverse to the Mutually Assured Destruction (MAD), which is widely regarded as designed to dissuade India from taking any military actions against Pakistan, as it did during the Indo-Pakistani War of 1971.

Minimal deterrence represents one way of solving the security dilemma and avoiding an arms race. Decision-makers often feel pressured to expand their arsenals when they perceive them to be vulnerable to an adversary's first strike, especially when both sides seek to achieve the advantage. Eliminating this perceived vulnerability reduces the incentive to produce more and advanced weapons. For example, the United States’ nuclear force exceeds the requirements of minimal deterrence, and is structured to strike numerous targets in multiple countries and to have the ability to conduct successful counterforce strikes with high confidence. In response to this, China continues to modernize its nuclear forces because its leaders are concerned about the survivability of their arsenal in the face of the United States’ advances in strategic reconnaissance, precision strike, and missile defense.

One disadvantage of minimal deterrence is that it requires an accurate understanding of the level of damage an adversary finds unacceptable, especially if that understanding changes over time so that a previously credible deterrent is no longer credible. A minimal deterrence strategy must also account for the nuclear firepower that would be "lost" or "neutralized" during an adversary's counterforce strike. Additionally, a minimal deterrence capability may embolden a state when it confronts a superior nuclear power, as has been observed in the relationship between China and the United States. Finally, while pursuing minimal deterrence during arms negotiations allows states to make reductions without becoming vulnerable, further reductions may be undesirable once minimal deterrence is reached because they will increase a state's vulnerability and provide an incentive for an adversary to secretly expand its nuclear arsenal.

== See also ==
- Nuclear peace
- Deterrence
