= Najmuddin Shaikh =

Pakistani diplomat (1939–2025)

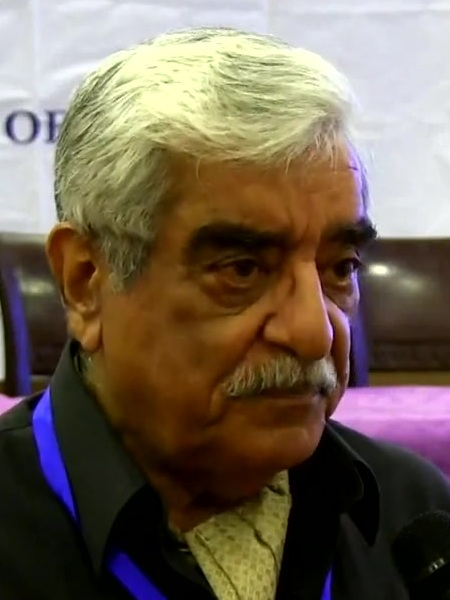

21st Foreign Secretary of Pakistan
- In office 30 April 1994 – 24 February 1997
- Prime Minister: Benazir Bhutto; Nawaz Sharif
- Preceded by: Shahryar Khan
- Succeeded by: Shamshad Ahmad

Personal details
- Born: 4 September 1939
- Died: 28 March 2025 (aged 85) Karachi, Sindh, Pakistan
- Spouse: Raana Shaikh
- Education: The Fletcher School of Law and Diplomacy at Tufts University

Najmuddin Shaikh (Urdu: نجم الدین شیخ; 4 September 1939 – 28 March 2025) was a Pakistani diplomat who was ambassador to the United States (1990–1991), and later served as Foreign Secretary of Pakistan (1994–1997).

== Education and family ==
Shaikh received his bachelor's degree from Sindh University. He was a graduate of Tufts University's Fletcher School of Law and Diplomacy (1962). His wife, Raana Shaikh, has served as the Managing Director of Pakistan Television, and earlier as Secretary for the Ministry of Culture. He was the brother of Air Marshal Riazuddin Shaikh.

== Career ==
Shaikh joined the Foreign Service of Pakistan in 1961. During his 38 years of service, he served as Pakistan's ambassador to Canada (1987–1989), ambassador to West Germany (1989–1990), ambassador to the United States (1990–1991), and ambassador to Iran (1992–1994). He then served as Foreign Secretary from 1994 to 1997, later replaced by Shamshad Ahmad. He also served as Pakistan's special envoy to Yemen, Sudan, Kenya, and Bahrain (February 2005).

== Other activities ==
Shaikh was a member of the board of governors of the Institute of Strategic Studies, Islamabad and senior vice president of the Karachi Council of Foreign Relations. He penned a weekly column on foreign affairs for the Dawn newspaper and then later for the Daily Pakistan newspaper.

== Death ==
Shaikh died in Karachi on 28 March 2025, at the age of 85.

Diplomatic posts
| Preceded by | Pakistan Ambassador to Canada; 1987–1989 | Succeeded by |
| Preceded by | Pakistan Ambassador to West Germany; 1989–1990 | Succeeded by |
| Preceded by Zulfiqar Ali Khan | Pakistan Ambassador to the United States; 1990–1991 | Succeeded by Syeda Abida Hussain |
| Preceded by | Pakistan Ambassador to Iran; 1992–1994 | Succeeded by |
| Preceded by Shahryar Khan | Foreign Secretary of Pakistan; 1994–1997 | Succeeded by Shamshad Ahmad |
