= New Concept of War Fighting =

Military doctrine of Pakistan

The New Concept of War Fighting (NCWF) is a military doctrine of the Pakistani armed forces coordinated by the army and air force, with additional navy contributions. It is based on the Cold Start military doctrine of the Indian Army, with uncertain additional concepts, tactics, and practices implemented by the Pakistan army. It was created after the Indian military created the CSD doctrine. Likewise, the Indian doctrine, NCWF, is designed to carry out the operations, mobilize troops and improve inter-services coordination in Indo–Pakistan related conflicts. These two countries share the same military culture, tradition, and history based on the British India Army.

It was formerly adopted in 2013 with a central role by the National Defence University and the air force. Established after Pakistan armed forces conducted a series of military exercises, including Azm-e-Nau and Azm-e-Naumilitary, its principal goals are focused on conducting independent secret missions in India-Pakistan conflicts with equipment distributions by the navy, air force and the army, including Babur cruise missiles, submarines, fast attack crafts, missile boats, and Harbah, an anti-ship missile.

== Origin ==
The NCWF is named after the Pakistani army's military exercises conducted between 2009 and 2013. NCWF's objective is to allow Pakistani forces to deploy defensively and offensively ahead of India.

== See also ==
- Nuclear doctrine of Pakistan
