= Nuclear doctrine of Pakistan =

Military doctrine of Pakistan

The Nuclear doctrine of Pakistan is a theoretical concept of military strategy that promotes deterrence by guaranteeing an immediate "massive retaliation" to an aggressive attack against the state.

Pakistan's foreign minister Shamshad Ahmad had warned that if Pakistan is ever invaded or attacked, it will use "any weapon in its arsenal" to defend itself.

== Persuasion for Effect ==
The doctrine is divided into four different thresholds before nuclear weapons would be operationally activated during a conventional or nuclear war with an aggressor state. In the event of war, for instance between India and Pakistan, the Indian Armed Forces' numerical superiority and large stock of conventional weaponry is most likely to overwhelm Pakistan. Therefore, in a deteriorating situation, where an Indian military aggression is more likely to penetrate through Pakistan's defenses (or has already breached the main defense line causing a major setback to overall defense) which cannot be reversed by conventional means, the government would be left with no other option except to use nuclear weapons to stabilize the situation, with a first strike.

The rationale behind the doctrine is to prevent Pakistan from any military intervention (both conventional and surgical) that would lead to the disintegration of the country, as it did in 1971 (see Indo-Pakistani war of 1971). South Asian affairs expert, Professor Stephen P. Cohen calls the strategy of Pakistan an "option-enhancing policy". The doctrine entails a stage-by-stage level of advancement in which the nuclear threat is increased at each step to deter India (or any aggressor state) from attacking:

1. A public or private warning.
2. A demonstration atomic test of a small atomic device on its own soil.
3. The use of (a) nuclear weapon(s) on Pakistan's soil against foreign attacking forces.
4. The use of (a) nuclear weapon(s) against critical but purely military targets on foreign soil, probably in thinly populated areas in the desert or semi-desert, causing the least collateral damage. This is possibly to prevent a retaliation against Pakistani cities.

The doctrine is not part of the Minimum Credible Deterrence principle of Pakistan, however, the doctrine integrates the nuclear dimension into its defence principles. According to the International Institute for Strategic Studies (IISS), the definition of the four potential thresholds has been refined from the first thresholds which were mentioned by officials at the Pakistan National Command Authority (NCA) in late 2001.

- Spatial threshold - The military penetration of Indian Armed Forces into Pakistan on a large scale may elicit a nuclearized massive retaliation, if and only if the Pakistan Army is unable to stop such intervention. For instance, many analysts, including some Indians, believe that the Indus Valley— the "lifeline" of Pakistan— is one of many other "red lines" that Indian forces should not cross. The capture of key objectives in this crucial northeast–southwest axis might well provoke nuclear retaliation by Pakistan.
- Military threshold - The complete knockout or comprehensive destruction of a large part of the Pakistan Armed Forces, particularly and most importantly the Pakistan Air Force (PAF), could lead to a quick nuclear response if Islamabad believed that it was losing the cohesiveness of its defence and feared imminent defeat. A senior ranking PAF officer maintained that "orders given to PAF (and its missile command) are identical to the guidelines given to the NATO commanders during the Cold war crises". This criterion is even more important for the Pakistan Armed Forces because of its critical role in maintaining the country's stability. As noted above, an attack on a nuclear installation has also been posited as a threshold. According to the PAF, this threshold would also be breached by the use of chemical or biological weapons against Pakistan, and would provoke a massive retaliation.
- Economic threshold - This level implicitly and explicitly refers for the countermeasure operations of the Pakistan Navy. Economic strangulation and economic blockade are also potential threats to Pakistan, if the Navy is unable to counter them effectively (for example, see operations: Trident and Python in 1971). This primarily refers to a potential Indian Navy blockade of Sindh and coastal cities of Balochistan, or the stoppage or significant reduction of Pakistan's share of water from the Indus, Jhelum and Chenab Rivers under the 1960 Indus Waters Treaty. It could also refer to the capture of vital arteries such as the Indus.
- Political threshold - Finally, Pakistan's geostrategists, game theorists, political strategists and planners suggest that a destabilization of the country by India could also be a nuclear threshold if Islamabad has credible reasons to believe that the integrity of the country were at stake. Stated scenarios are political destabilization or large-scale internal destabilization which the Pakistan Marines (along with the Civil Armed Forces) are unable to stabilize effectively. One example would be encouraging the breakaway of one or more of Pakistan's provinces (as in during the Bangladesh Liberation War).

== See also ==
- Pakistan and weapons of mass destruction
- Threat Matrix (database)
- New Concept of War Fighting
