= Nuclear taboo =

Societal view against use of nuclear weapons

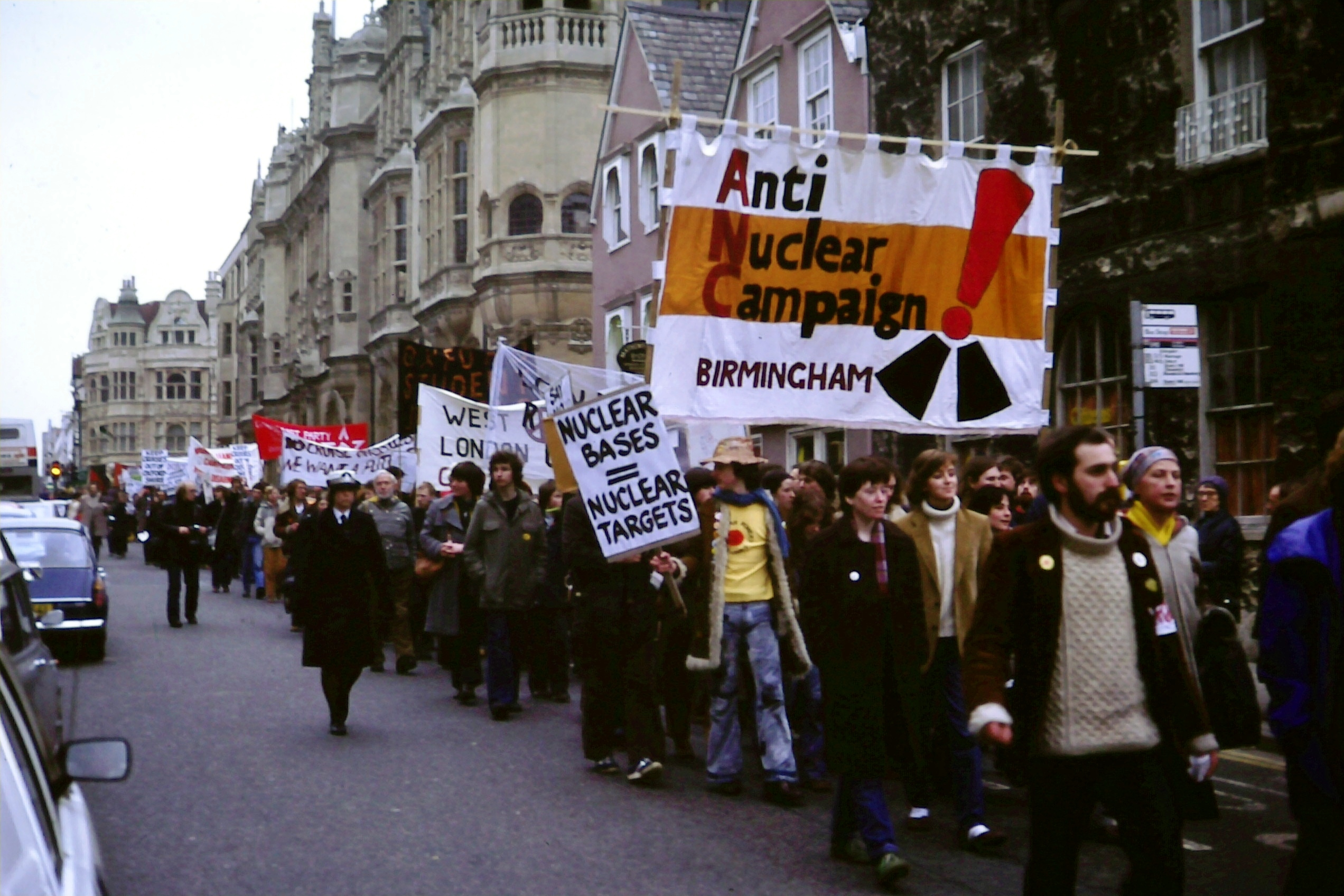
A protest against nuclear weapons that was held in Oxford during 1980

The "nuclear taboo" refers to the supposed international norm against using nuclear weapons. While the existence of this taboo is accepted by many experts, it has not reached full consensus. The taboo takes the form of a shared understanding of the illegitimacy and immorality of using nuclear weapons.

This norm is used to explain why nuclear weapons have not been used in any war since the end of World War II. (Note: Atomic bombings of Hiroshima and Nagasaki) As an explanation for nuclear non-use, it stands in contrast to rationalist deterrence theory frameworks, such as mutually assured destruction (MAD), which attribute non-use to fear of retaliation. It also differs from social theories that argue states avoid nuclear weapons because their use violates international law.

== Definitions ==
The concept of a "nuclear taboo" was popularised by the academic Nina Tannenwald, who wrote an influential journal article on the concept in 1999. She defined the nuclear taboo in 2005 as "a de facto prohibition against the first use of nuclear weapons". Tannenwald remains among the most prominent advocates for the existence of this taboo.

Tannenwald has also written that:

the nuclear taboo exhibits many, although not all, of the characteristics associated with taboos: it is a prohibition, it refers to danger, and it involves expectations of awful or uncertain consequences or sanctions if violated. Further, it is also a “bright line” norm: once the threshold between use and nonuse is crossed, one is immediately in a new world with all the unimaginable consequences that could follow. Finally, the nuclear taboo counteracts the deep attraction that nuclear weapons present to national leaders as the “ultimate weapon” and reminds them of the danger that lurks behind such weapons.

In the textbook Strategy in the Contemporary World: An Introduction to Strategic Studies the concept is defined as a view that the use of nuclear weapons "is considered so disreputable and immoral that states are reluctant to use such weapons; the use of such weapons would make the state in question an outcast, despised by its peers, including those which might otherwise be sympathetic to it".

The academic Joshua A. Schwartz has defined the taboo as being that "nuclear use is perceived as so morally abhorrent that it is not even considered by policymakers or members of the public".

== Debate over the concept ==
Tannenwald has stated that the norm against the use of nuclear weapons developed during the first decades of the Cold War. It was driven by the anti-nuclear movement and advocacy from governments of some countries which did not possess nuclear weapons, and aimed to stigmatise the use of nuclear weapons. The governments of the United States and Soviet Union also developed a norm of nuclear restraint following the Cuban Missile Crisis in 1962.

The authors of Strategy in the Contemporary World note that "many observers" contend that the nuclear taboo exists. However, they argue that the existence of such a taboo is unproven given that there have been "no truly hard cases in which a nuclear state chose to not use its arsenal; for instance no nuclear-armed country has chosen to allow itself to be destroyed rather than use its arsenal against an invader".

In 2024 Schwartz argued that the nuclear taboo does not exist. This is because his research has found that policy makers have seriously considered using nuclear weapons on multiple occasions. Schwartz also cites opinion polls that have found majority or near-majority public support in China, France, Israel, the United Kingdom and the United States for their governments to use nuclear weapons in certain circumstances. Janina Dill, Scott Sagan, and Ben Valentino looked at public opinion on nuclear weapons in the US, U.K., France and Israel. They found that the majority of people in the countries they looked at endorse the use of nuclear weapons by their leaders when it is the most effective option, but are not as supportive of that option when there are significant civilian casualties. That is not the structure of public opinion that would be expected if there was a nuclear taboo.

== See also ==
- Mutual assured destruction
- Nuclear weapons debate
