= Nina Tannenwald =

American political scientist

Nina Tannenwald is an American political scientist. She is a senior lecturer in the Department of Political Science at Brown University, and a former director of Brown's International Relations Program.

Tannenwald has a MA from the Columbia University School of International and Public Affairs and a PhD in international relations from Cornell University. She was an assistant professor at the University of Colorado Boulder, and was Joukowsky Family Assistant Research Professor and then associate professor in Brown University's Watson Institute for International and Public Affairs before taking her present position in the Department of Political Science.

Tannenwald has popularised the concept of there being a "nuclear taboo" which prevents the use of nuclear weapons. Her 2007 book, The Nuclear Taboo: The United States and the Nonuse of Nuclear Weapons Since 1945, was the winner of the Lepgold Book Prize of Georgetown University for the best book in international relations.

== Books ==
- The Nuclear Taboo: The United States and the Nonuse of Nuclear Weapons Since 1945 (Cambridge University Press, 2007)
- Editor with Matthew Evangelista, Do the Geneva Conventions Matter? (Oxford University Press, 2017)

== Book chapters ==
- with Richard Price and Peter J Katzenstein “Norms and Deterrence: The Nuclear and Chemical Weapons Taboos” in The Culture of National Security: Norms and Identity in World Politics (Columbia University Press, 1996)
- Nina Tannenwald, “The Legacy of the Nuclear Taboo in the 21st Century,” in Michael Gordin and John Ikenberry, eds. Global Hiroshima: The History, Politics and Legacies of Nuclear Weapons (Oxford University Press, 2019)
- Nina Tannenwald, “Assessing the Effects and Effectiveness of the 1949 Geneva Conventions,” in Matthew Evangelista and Nina Tannenwald, eds. Do the Geneva Conventions Matter? (Oxford, 2017), pp. 1–34.
- Nina Tannenwald, “Normative Strategies for Disarmament,” in Nikola Hynek and Michal Smetana, eds., Global Nuclear Disarmament: Strategic, Political and Regional Perspectives, C zech Institute of International Relations (Routledge, 2015), pp. 107–121.
- Nina Tannenwald, “The Status and Future of the Nuclear Taboo,” in Harsh V. Pant, ed., Handbook of Nuclear Proliferation (Routledge, 2012), pp. 62–74.
- Nina Tannenwald, “ Gerechtigkeit und Fairness im Nuklearen Nichtverbreitungsregime:” in Claudia Baumgart-Ochse, Niklas Shörnig, Simone Wizotski, and Jonas Wolff, eds., Auf Dem Weg Zu Just Peace Governance (Nomos 2011). German translation.
- Nina Tannenwald, “The United Nations and Debates Over Weapons of Mass Destruction,” in Richard Price and Mark Zacher, eds., The United Nations and Global Security (Palgrave, 2004), pp. 3–20.
- Nina Tannenwald, "Norms and Deterrence: The Nuclear and Chemical Weapons Taboos," co- author, Richard Price, in Peter Katzenstein, ed., The Culture of National Security: Norms and Identity in World Politics (Columbia University Press, 1996), pp. 114–152.
- Nina Tannenwald, "The Changing Role of U.S. Nuclear Weapons," in Michele Flournoy, ed., Nuclear Weapons After the Cold War: Guidelines for U.S. Policy (HarperCollins, 1993), pp. 3 6-71.
- Nina Tannenwald, "The UN and Peacekeeping," in Donald Puchala, ed., Issues Before the 39th UN General Assembly (United Nations Association, 1984)
