= Credible minimum deterrence =

Principle on which Pakistan and India's nuclear doctrines are based

Credible minimum deterrence is the principle on which India's nuclear strategy is based.

It underlines no first use (NFU) with an assured second strike capability and falls under minimal deterrence, as opposed to mutually assured destruction. India's tentative nuclear doctrine was announced on August 17, 1999, by the secretary of the National Security Advisory Board, Brajesh Mishra.

Later, the draft was adopted with some modifications when the Nuclear Command Authority was announced on January 4, 2003. A significant modification was the dilution of the NFU principle to include nuclear retaliation to attacks by biological and chemical weapons.
