= Shamshad Ahmad Khan =

Pakistani diplomat and former Foreign Secretary

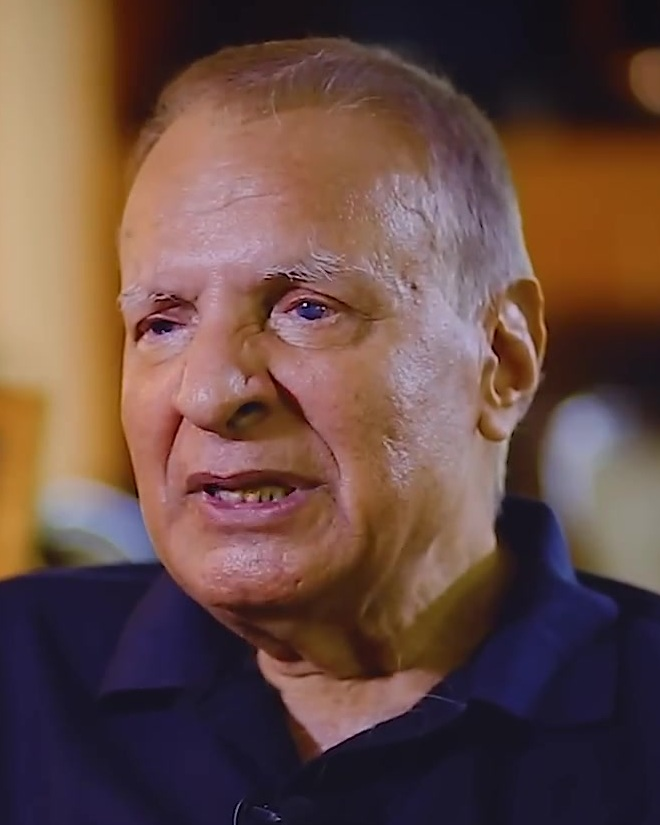

Permanent Representative of Pakistan to the United Nations
- In office February 2000 – May 2002
- Preceded by: Inam-ul-Haq
- Succeeded by: Munir Akram

Foreign Secretary of Pakistan
- In office 25 February 1997 – 17 February 2000
- Preceded by: Najmuddin Shaikh
- Succeeded by: Inam-ul-Haq

Personal details
- Born: 10 December 1941 (age 84)
- Education: Government College Lahore

Shamshad Ahmad Khan (Urdu: شمشاد احمد خان) (born 10 December 1941) is a veteran Pakistani diplomat, international relations expert and an author who served in BPS-22 grade as the Foreign Secretary of Pakistan from 1997 to 2000. He also served as the Permanent Representative of Pakistan to the United Nations between 2000 till 2002. Shamshad Ahmad Khan also was the Pakistan's ambassador to South Korea and Iran.

He currently writes a weekly column for English daily The News International (newspaper). Before that, he was a regular contributor to The Nation (Pakistan) (newspaper). He also writes occasionally for the Dawn (newspaper) and The Express Tribune (newspaper) – all of them Pakistani newspapers.

== Education ==
Shamshad Ahmad Khan did his master's degree in Political Science and B.A (Hons) from Government College Lahore before joining Foreign Service of Pakistan in 1965.

== Diplomatic career ==
His diplomatic career includes various posts at the capital of Pakistan, in Islamabad at the Ministry of Foreign Affairs and in Pakistani missions abroad. He served as Ambassador to South Korea (1987–1990) and Iran (1990–1992), as Secretary-General, Economic Cooperation Organization (ECO) (1992–1996), Pakistan's Foreign Secretary (1997–2000), and as Pakistan's Ambassador and Permanent Representative to the UN (2000–2002).

As Secretary-General of ECO, a regional cooperation organization headquartered in Tehran, he steered its expansion in 1992 from a trilateral entity (Iran, Pakistan and Turkey) into a 10-member regional organization with the induction of seven new members, namely, Afghanistan, Azerbaijan, Kazakhstan, Kyrgyzstan, Tajikistan, Turkmenistan, and Uzbekistan, giving it a new global dimension and fresh regional framework and common socio-economic development strategy.

== Foreign secretary ==
As Pakistan's Foreign Secretary, he managed and executed his country's foreign policy during an extraordinary period of its history that saw the resumption of India-Pakistan peace process, overt nuclearization of first India and then Pakistan, the Kargil War and the October 12, 1999 military coup in Pakistan. Foreign Secretary, Shamshad Ahmad Khan was the one who had announced the last nuclear test (Pakistan's 6th one compared to India's 5 nuclear tests) in a defiant, nationally televised speech on 30 May 1998 stating that the world powers had ignored the long-simmering conflict between India and Pakistan until these nuclear explosions by both countries only because it raised the possibility of a nuclear war back into the global agenda and focus. He also stated that no radiation escaped into the atmosphere but refused to share technical data about the explosion. Speaking after the nuclear tests, Foreign Secretary Shamshad Ahmad Khan told reporters that it was not Pakistan's purpose to enter into an arms race with India and that Pakistan was forced to develop its nuclear capability only in self-defense and only to restore the strategic balance with India after their nuclear tests earlier.

Earlier, he signed the June 23, 1997 agreement in Islamabad with his Indian counterpart Salman Haider on resumption of India-Pakistan peace process which is today the basis of the ongoing "composite dialogue" between the two countries.

In the aftermath of India-Pakistan nuclear tests in May 1998, he played a key role in promoting mutual "restraint and responsibility" between India and Pakistan, and on the occasion of the Lahore Summit, signed a memorandum of understanding with his Indian counterpart on February 21, 1999, laying down a framework of mutual "nuclear risk reduction" and other confidence-building measures aimed at preventing the risk of nuclear conflict and unauthorized or accidental use of nuclear weapons.

Shamshad Ahmad Khan also held eight rounds of talks with his US counterpart Strobe Talbott from May 1998 to February 1999 on issues of peace and security in South Asia, including nuclear and strategic stability stabilization measures.

== Pakistan ambassador to UN ==
During his tenure as Ambassador to the United Nations, he co-chaired together with Ambassador of New Zealand, UN General Assembly's Working Group on Conflict Resolution and Sustainable Development in Africa, and also served as Senior Consultant to the UN on economic and social matters (2002–2003) with particular focus on sustainable development and poverty alleviation. Ambassador Shamshad Ahmad Khan also co-chaired, together with Ambassador Ruth Jacoby of Sweden, the International Conference on Financing for Development held in Monterrey (Mexico) on 18–22 March 2002.

== Books ==
- Dreams Unfulfilled by Shamshad Ahmad Khan, 2009.
- Pakistan and World Affairs by Shamshad Ahmad Khan, published in 2014.
- Pakistan's Foreign Policy Dilemma: A Perennial Quest for Survival, 2020.
- Witness to History, 2025.

Diplomatic posts
Preceded by Najmuddin Shaikh	Foreign Secretary of Pakistan; 1997–2000	Succeeded by Inam-ul-Haq
Preceded by Inam-ul-Haq	Pakistan Ambassador to the United Nations; 2000–2002	Succeeded by Munir Akram
