= Essentials of Post–Cold War Deterrence =

Essentials of Post–Cold War Deterrence is a document produced in 1995 as a "Terms of Reference" by the Policy Subcommittee of the Strategic Advisory Group (SAG) of the United States Strategic Command (current USSTRATCOM, former CINCSTRAT), a branch of the Department of Defense. The document, drafted under former Commander-in-Chief of CINCSTRAT Admiral Chiles, is to be used as a baseline for future policies and strategies in "expanding the Deterrence of the Use of Weapons of mass destruction." Although originally classified, it has since been declassified and published by the Nautilus Institute.

The Introduction of the document states the following:

Over the period of the Cold War, both the United States and the Soviet Union developed an understanding of deterrence and its role in preventing war with one another. With the end of the Cold War and the spread of Weapons of mass destruction, deterrence takes on a broader multinational dimension. This paper addresses the broader view of deterrence and the question, "How do we deter nations, other than the Former Soviet Union, from using Weapons of Mass Destruction?"

The article is notable not only for its significance in outlining current United States military strategy and foreign policy, but also for its explicit advocation of ambiguity regarding "what is permitted" for other nations and its endorsement of "irrationality", or more precisely, the perception thereof, as an important tool in deterrence and foreign policy.

The document claims that the capacity of the United States in exercising deterrence would be hurt by portraying U.S. leaders as fully rational and cool-headed, stating that:

The fact that some elements may appear to be potentially 'out of control' can be beneficial to creating and reinforcing fears and doubts in the minds of an adversary's decision makers. This essential sense of fear is the working force of deterrence. That the U.S. may become irrational and vindictive if its vital interests are attacked should be part of the national persona we project to all adversaries.

== See also ==
- Deterrence theory
- Peace through strength
