= Strategic stability =

Strategic stability is a concept in international relations indicating a lack of incentives for any party to initiate the nuclear first strike; the term is also used in a broader sense of the state of the international environment helping to avoid a war. Strategic stability characterizes the degree of the deterrence provided by mutual assured destruction and depends on the survivability of the strategic forces after the first strike.

== Definition ==
The meaning of the term depends on the context. Edward Warner, a U.S. Secretary of Defense's representative at the New START talks, has observed that the strategic stability can be defined at multiple levels, from the narrowest to the broadest:

1. The most narrow sense, described in the rest of this article – making the first strike less tempting in the event of a crisis (also known as crisis stability) and absence of incentives to build up the nuclear arsenals (avoiding the arms race instability) – is used by the nuclear-weapon states, including the United States, Even in this narrowest sense there is no universally agreed-upon definition of the strategic stability or ways to quantify it, as the vulnerabilities are country-specific;
2. A broader sense describes the condition of no armed conflict between the nuclear powers;
3. In its broadest sense strategic stability defines an international situation, not necessarily global, which is not conducive to an outbreak of a war.

The governments, sometimes intentionally, make confusing references to the strategic stability:

- the most consistent is the US government that typically uses the term in the context of reducing incentives to strike first, although occasionally the term is still used in a broader sense;
- the Russian government uses all three meanings listed above interchangeably;
- the position of China ranges from refusing to acknowledge the applicability of the term to the PRC (since, in the Chinese view, the stability requires at the minimum the nuclear balance) to the statements that the disarmament efforts shall have strategic stability and indivisibility of security as their goals.

== Evolution ==
Although the traditional view of the impact of the strategic stability, "to make a first strike less plausible", was clearly articulated only in 1990 in a joint US-Soviet statement, the corresponding ideas date back to the early 1950s (the exact roots are hard to identify, as many authors were "circling around" the topic at the time). During the development of the concept (until the early 1960s) the adjective "strategic" was rarely used, most authors used the term "stability" instead, mostly in the sense of the modern crisis stability. The early thinking that evolved into the discussion of stability dates as early as 1946, when the dueling views of Bernard Brodie and William L. Borden were expressed. Brodie considered the nuclear bombs to be an effective weapon when used against the cities, while Borden argued that in the almost inevitable future nuclear war the prime target should be the nuclear forces of the enemy, as "attacking cities ... can so easily be carried out later", and the "assets of surprise and the initiative" should not be squandered on them. In combination, these views reflect both sides of the strategic stability framework: the problem of the vulnerability of the strategic forces to a surprise attack and protecting the ability for a nuclear retaliation as a solution. US discourse in the early 1950s was concentrated on the vulnerability of the Strategic Air Command (SAC) forces to a surprise Soviet attack due to the concentration of its airplanes and atomic bombs at a few densely packed airfields, with proposed solutions involving both making the US nuclear forces more survivable and launching US nuclear bombers preemptively in the case of an imminent attack by the USSR, with the emphasis on preemption. In the words of Eisenhower, US strategic force "once in the air could be recalled ... if it stayed on the ground it might never get off".

A glimpse of the concept of mutual assured destruction (MAD) can be seen in the National Security Council Report 162/2 (NSC-162/2) of October 30, 1953: "a stage of atomic plenty and ample means of delivery [for both sides] ... could create a stalemate, with both sides reluctant to initiate general warfare". The Killian Report of the Science Advisory Committee predicted in 1955 the arrival in the middle of 1960s of the "Period IV", when "neither country can derive a winning advantage, because each country will possess enough multimegaton weapons and adequate means of delivering them." However, the authors of the report did not figure out that MAD can lead to strategic stability, declared instead that the period IV will be "fraught with danger" due to instability and recommended measures to delay its arrival. The report concentrated on the unilateral American moves (like building a large quantity of intercontinental ballistic missiles) and completely ignored the possibility of negotiating arms control agreements or other security-building measures with the USSR. Eisenhower disliked an idea of building a lot of missiles and fighting the war when "Russians can fire 1000 [missiles] at us and we can fire 1000 a day at them" and in 1955 proposed the "Open Skies agreement" that would enable each side to perform aerial reconnaissance over the territory of the other side thus checking that there are no preparations for a surprise attack underway. The "counterintuitive" idea that the Americans are safer when Soviets know that the US is not getting ready for a first strike was an important step towards development of the concept of strategic stability (although not yet labeled as such). USSR had rejected the proposal, arguing that the information gathered can actually facilitate a surprise attack. On the American side, the importance of arms control agreements was stressed in 1957 in the Gaither Report. US Navy, while competing for government funds with the SAC and land-based missiles, advanced the thinking on the crisis stability by introducing a concept of "finite deterrence": a small number of missiles on highly survivable submarines not only can provide the same deterrence as a much larger number of land-based missiles, but more time for making decisions becomes available in the moment of crisis, as the retaliation strike loses its launch-now-or-never quality.

By 1958 USSR had recognized the dangers of the fear of the first strike by an opponent. However, the US-USSR Surprise Attack Conference (Geneva, November 10th to December 18th, 1958) was a failure due to divergent goals: Americans were looking to identify the technical solutions for preventing the first strike, while Soviets tried to include broader issues, like reducing the presence of US forces in Germany. During the preparations for the conference, one of the earliest official applications of the term "stability" in the nuclear strike context, defined as "freedom from the threat of surprise attack", appeared in an American document.

The 1950s also witnessed the development of another aspect of the strategic stability - focusing on interactions between the states and taking potential thinking of the other side into consideration. The American experts then assumed that the Soviet approach is identical to the American one. This logical leap of an adversary being a "mirror image" of self was taken despite the official rhetoric about the aggressive aims of the USSR and dangers of its ideology, and the validity of this assumption is impossible to verify due to the Russian archives on the subject being still closed (as of 2013). Foundations of the strategic stability reached the wide audience through an article by Albert Wohlstetter in the Foreign Affairs magazine, The Delicate Balance of Terror (1958). Wohlstetter's ideas have influenced Thomas Schelling, who in December 1958 had published a RAND article “Surprise Attack and Disarmament where he argued that the important condition for the deterrence is "is not the ‘balance’ — the sheer equality or symmetry in the situation — ... it is the stability of the balance". Therefore, per Schelling, the "good" weapons are the ones targeting the opponent's society at large and useless against his strategic forces, while the "bad" ones are able to reduce the opponent's ability to strike back, thus providing a "premium on haste" and increasing the chance of a nuclear war.

The concept of strategic stability became widespread among experts in the early 1960s, while the US government had accepted it later, when "the stability of our deterrent" language appeared in the annual Draft Presidential Memorandum on Strategic Offensive and Defensive Forces in 1969.

In the post-Cold War situation the concept of strategic stability, along with the arms control, appeared to have lost its significance. With Russia no longer considered a peer competitor, constraints on the American behavior did not look justified, especially when the new threats from the regional adversaries and China were considered. Due to the new balance of forces the survivability of forces after the first strike became much less of an issue for the USA than for Russia. Dall’Agnol and Cepik argued in 2021 that the U.S. withdrawal from the ABM Treaty in 2001 began the erosion of the institutional foundations of strategic stability in the 21st century. Brustlein suggests that in this environment Europeans are the ones to be worried about the strategic stability.

== Crisis stability and arms race stability ==
Traditional definition of the crisis stability belongs to Schelling: the crisis is stable "if neither side has or perceives an incentive to use nuclear weapons first out of the fear that the other side is about to do so". Crisis instability is one pathway through which a political or conventional armed conflict can turn nuclear.

James M. Acton defines the arms race stability as "the absence of perceived or actual incentives to augment a nuclear force ... out of the fear that in a crisis an opponent would gain a meaningful advantage by using nuclear weapons first". Acton goes further by arguing that the crisis stability and arms race stability are two views of the same "concern that an adversary might use nuclear weapons first in a crisis", observed on different timescales, with the classic crisis stability corresponding to the shortest decision times, and the arms race instability to the longest ones.

Acton considers the following timescales and corresponding force posture adjustments:

- the decision for the first ("preemptive") strike needs to be takes in minutes to few days. While never used, both Americans and Soviets clearly used this option in the war planning in the past and rightfully expected the other side to harbor similar plans;
- raising the alert level of the nuclear forces (dispersing the planes and submarines, mating the nuclear warheads to their carriers) takes hours to days. Despite the inevitable escalatory nature and increased probability of an accidental launch, this change in posture has been utilized few times by the USSR (during the Caribbean crisis and Able Archer 83), USA (in August 1978 when two Soviet ballistic missile submarines (SSBNs) had approached the East Coast of the United States), and China (during the Sino-Soviet border conflict);
- moving the weapons (for example, the deployment of Soviet missiles to Cuba in 1962) takes months to years;
- building up the arsenal (arms race instability) requires years and is frequently driven by the survivability concerns.

== Critique ==
The value of strategic stability was questioned from the very beginning. Brustlein points to two negative effects of achieving the strategic stability:

- adversaries might be actually encouraged to initiate or expand low-level conflicts due to being certain that a nuclear escalation is unfeasible (cf. the Stability–instability paradox);
- limiting military spending can be elusive, as deterrence requires credibility and the latter is impossible without the means to win a nuclear war, "arms control can only function when it is not needed".
