= Pax Atomica =

Peace due to nuclear deterrence

Pax Atomica (Latin for “Atomic Peace”) is one of the terms that has sometimes been used to describe the period of severe tensions without a major military conflict between the United States and the Soviet Union during the Cold War. The term is also at times used to describe the entire post World War II/ post-atomic-bomb era.

In the phrase's narrower application, applying only to the Cold War era, the phrase refers to the argument that the stability between the two superpowers was caused by each side's large nuclear arsenals which led to a state of Mutually Assured Destruction (MAD) and deterrence. That is, if one of the superpowers would have launched a nuclear attack, the other would have responded in the same way, resulting in the destruction of both countries, and potentially global mass starvation due to nuclear winter. John Lewis Gaddis has described the period as the Long Peace.

In the phrase's broader application, applying to the entire post World War II era, the phrase refers to the argument that the possession of nuclear arms by several of the world's larger powers has tended to act to prevent the outbreak of full-scale warfare between any of these several powers, also due to the probability of MAD.

The phrase Pax Atomica is derived from the more popular term Pax Romana, which describes the period of stability under Roman hegemony during the Roman Age.

== See also ==
- Nuclear arms race
- Balance of power (international relations)
