= Pakistan–United States relations =

- Pakistan: United States

Diplomatic mission
- Embassy of Pakistan, Washington, D.C.: Embassy of the United States, Islamabad

Envoy
- Pakistani Ambassador to the United States Rizwan Saeed Sheikh: Chargé d'affaires to Pakistan Natalie A. Baker

Pakistan–United States relations began shortly after the independence of Pakistan. The United States recognized Pakistan on August 15, 1947, becoming one of the first countries to establish formal diplomatic relations with the new state. Bilateral relations have historically been marked by periods of close military cooperation followed by periods of strain, resulting in what has been called a "roller coaster" relationship.

Despite its troubled history, the Pakistani military has played an important role in several phases of American geopolitical strategy, and has been a major non-NATO ally since 2002. After Pakistan's participation in the Afghan peace process and the Taliban takeover in Afghanistan in 2021, the United States' relations with Pakistan underwent a strained period. At the same time, the strategic convergence of the United States and India has also brought greater pressure on Pakistani diplomacy. Relations showed signs of improvement during the early years of Donald Trump's second presidential term, particularly in trade and security cooperation.

== Background ==
During the Cold War (1945–1991), Pakistan allied itself with the Western Bloc led by the United States against the Eastern Bloc led by the Soviet Union, with the former advocating the economic system of capitalism while the latter advocated socialism. Following the 1958 Pakistani military coup, president Muhammad Ayub Khan established a strong military alliance with the United States. During the Bangladesh Liberation War and the Indo-Pakistani War of 1971, the United States aided Pakistan against the Provisional Government of Bangladesh and India. After the Pakistani defeat, Pakistan's leader Zulfikar Ali Bhutto, an anti-American, improved relations with the Soviets. In 1977, Bhutto was overthrown in a military coup led by Muhammad Zia-ul-Haq. Following the Soviet invasion of Afghanistan in 1979, Pakistan and the United States cooperated in the funding and financing of the anti-communist Afghan Mujahideen and then in the ensuing First Afghan Civil War. The United States has imposed sanctions on Pakistan on various occasions to force Pakistan to comply with its strategic interests since 1965, with Pakistan's willingness to participate with the United States in the wars in Somalia and Bosnia, relations improved. However, the United States again suspended aid and imposed sanctions along with India in 1998, only to be lifted once again with the United States engagement in Afghanistan in 2001. Factors involving in the contingency operations, distrust, and different priorities of both nations in the Afghan War led to serious criticism as both sides began to criticize each other's strategy to achieve common goals in the war on terror. The United States continues to blame Pakistan's military for supporting non-state actors, including the Taliban. Furthermore, drone strikes by both nations, a friendly fire incident at Salala, and an incident involving the arrest of a spy in Lahore further complicated relations for the worse.

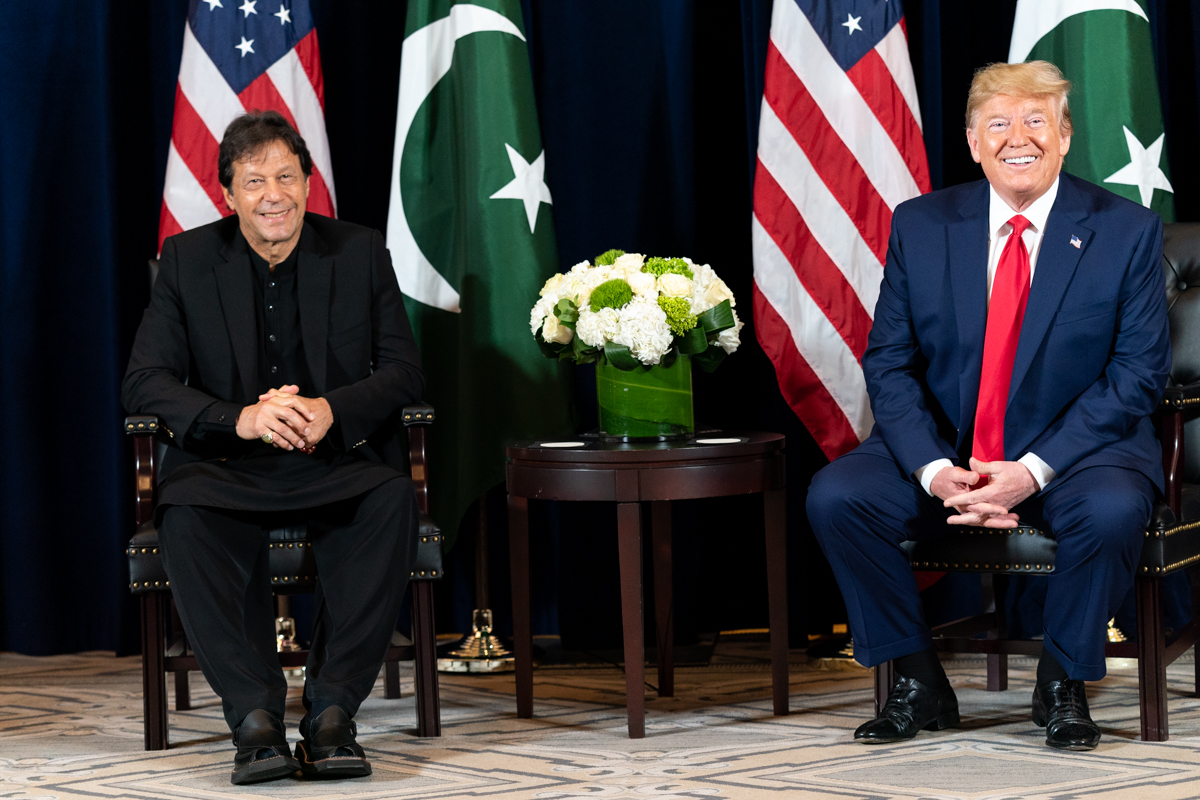
Former PM Imran Khan and Donald Trump during 2019 UNGA

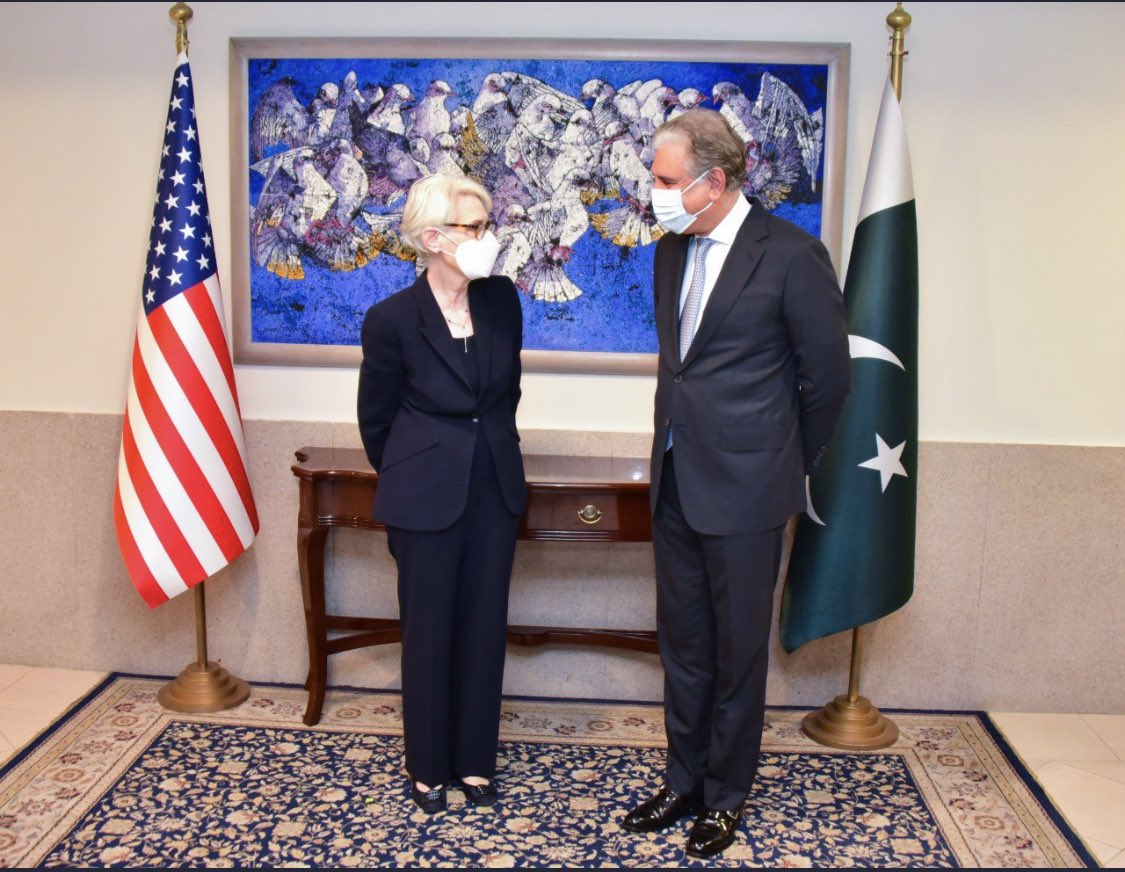
In 2021, U.S. Deputy Secretary of State Wendy Sherman told the Pakistani government, "We don't see ourselves building a broad relationship with Pakistan, and we have no interest in returning to the days of hyphenated India-Pakistan," she added. "That's not where we are. That's not where we’re going to be."

=== Third-party factors in Pakistan–U.S. relations ===
The U.S.'s troubled relationship with Pakistan continues to be eroded by crisis after crisis. It has been alleged that the ISI of Pakistan pays journalists to write articles hostile to the United States in the early 2010s. Despite this, both Pakistan and the United States continue to seek a productive relationship to defeat terrorist organizations in the war on terror. But in recent years, "Islamabad has arguably lost some of its strategic significance in the West following the US/NATO withdrawal from Afghanistan". Pakistan once provided NATO with a supply route to Afghanistan, a link that dominated bilateral relations during the war. However, with the end of the war and the withdrawal of US troops from the region in the early 2020s, Pakistan's influence on the US disappeared and the US no longer needed it to engage with Afghanistan.

Pakistan's decades-long rivalry and conflict with the U.S. strategic partner India in the context of Kashmir and all-weather strategic cooperation with China in the context of great power competition between the United States and China poses difficulties for the country's efforts to improve relations with the U.S.

U.S. President Donald Trump said on 14 January 2026 that countries that do business with Iran will face a new 25% tariff. This includes Pakistan which imports 7% of Iran's goods to as of 2023.

=== Diaspora ===
There are an estimated 554,202 self-identified Pakistani Americans living in the United States and about 52,486 Americans residing in Pakistan. In addition, Pakistan also hosts one of the largest embassies of the United States in Islamabad, and the largest consulate-general, in terms of both personnel and facilities, in the city of Karachi.

== History ==
=== 1947–1958: Relations between the United States and the newly-independent state ===
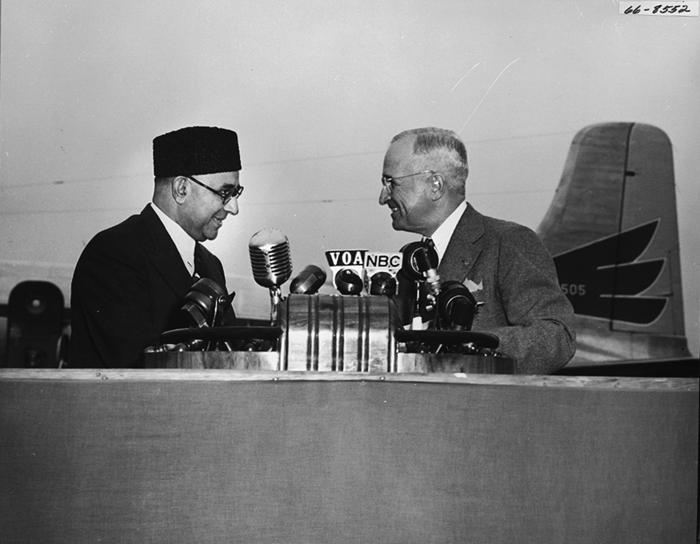
Prime Minister Liaquat Ali Khan meeting President Harry Truman.

Following Pakistan's creation from the British Indian Empire, the nascent state struggled to position itself as a non-aligned member of the international community. Pakistan's pro-communist forces commanded considerable support in East Pakistan, while in West Pakistan, the pro-Soviet Pakistan Socialist Party remained largely marginalized. The pro-American Pakistan Muslim League dominated much of West Pakistan's political landscape, particularly in the prosperous region of Punjab, while its base of support in East Pakistan was far more modest.

Prime Minister Liaquat Ali Khan, however, attempted to establish friendly relations with both the Soviet Union and the United States in hopes that Pakistan could benefit from an alliance with both superpowers. Both the Military of Pakistan and Foreign Service of Pakistan raised doubts as to whether the Soviets had the political will and capacity to provide military, technical, and economic aid to a similar degree that they had begun to offer to Pakistan's socialist neighbor, India. Pakistan nevertheless requested military aid from the USSR, which was predictably rebuffed as the Soviet Union had previously oriented itself with India. The government's overtures to the Soviet Union were not favorably regarded by Pakistan's conservative middle classes, who regarded the USSR as an atheist and socialist ally of India.

In 1950, the United States extended an overture to Pakistan by inviting Prime Minister Khan for an official state visit. As the USSR had rebuffed capitalist Pakistan and aligned itself with Pakistan's rivals, the country's policy crafters found that maintaining friendly relations with both superpowers was impossible. Prime Minister Khan accepted the American invitation and paid an official 23-day state visit to the United States beginning on May 3, 1950. The event was highly politicized in Pakistan, and outraged the country's leftists, and was seen as the seminal event that lead to warm diplomatic ties for several decades. However, it is alleged that during PM Khan's first visit to the US, president Truman requested Pakistan's premier to let the CIA formulate a base in Pakistan, strictly to keep an eye on the activities of Soviet Union – a request which was not granted by Khan.

Throughout the period between 1950 and 1953, several major Pakistan political and military figures paid visits to the United States. During this time, Army commander Ayub Khan paid visits to the United States – a figure who would later institute a strongly pro-American military government. Foreign Minister Sir Muhammad Zafrullah Khan, Foreign Secretary Ikram-Ullah Khan, Finance Minister Malik Ghulam Muhammad, and Defense Secretary Iskandar Mirza all paid official state visits to the United States.

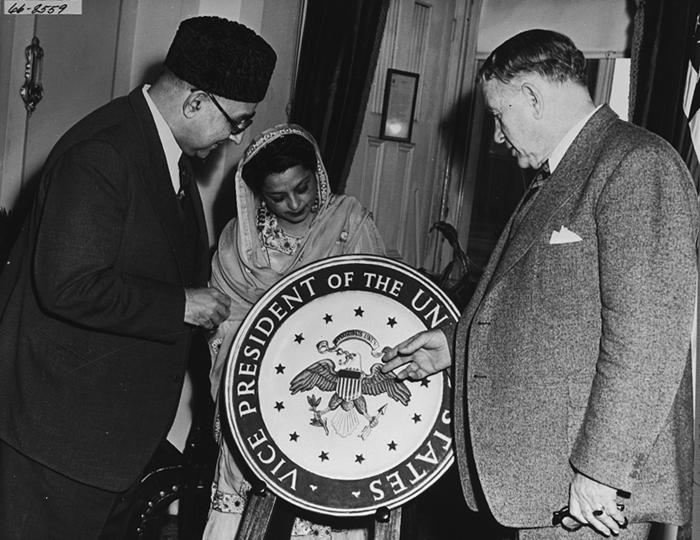
U.S. Vice President Alben W. Barkley explains the 1948 version of the Vice President's seal to Prime Minister Liaqat Ali Khan of Pakistan and his wife

Defense ties between the two countries strengthened almost immediately following Khan's visit to the United States. Personal goodwill towards Pakistan was evident even when Liaqat Ali Khan was assassinated in 1951. Under the government of Khawaja Nazimuddin, Pakistani and American officials developed positive attitudes towards one another. Such personal goodwill was evident when Secretary of State John Foster Dulles, while arguing for wheat aid to Pakistan in 1953, told the sub-committee on Agriculture and Forestry during hearings that, "the people of Pakistan had a splendid military tradition," and that in Karachi he had been met by a guard of honour which was the "finest" he had ever seen". Close ties between the countries were further consolidated by a mutual defense treaty signed in May 1954, after which hundreds of Pakistani military officers began to regularly train in the United States. A U.S. Military Assistance Advisory Group (MAAG) was also established in Rawalpindi, then capital of Pakistan. Pakistani officers were not only trained in military tactics, but also taught leadership, management, and economic theory.

In 1956, President Dwight Eisenhower requested permission from Pakistan's new Prime Minister, Huseyn Suhravardie, to lease the Peshawar Air Station (PAS), which was to be used in intelligence gathering of Soviet intercontinental ballistic missiles. The request was granted, and soon the United States built an airstrip, command and control station at the site before initiating operations. The base was regarded as top-secret, and even the high-ranking Pakistani public officials such as Zulfikar Ali Bhutto, were refused entry to the facility.

American interest in Pakistan as an ally against the spread of communism primarily was focused on maintaining excellent ties with Pakistan's military establishment. Prime Minister Huseyn Suhrawardy paid several official visits to the United States – typically with his Army commander, Ayub Khan, at his side. After a military coup d'état in 1958, Ayub Khan argued that left wing activists could seize power in Pakistan, thereby jeopardizing American interests in the region. He successfully convinced American officials that the Pakistani military was the strongest and most capable institution to govern the country.

=== Mutual defense alliances and the Soviet-Afghan War ===
As Pakistan sided with the Western Bloc against the Soviet Union in the 1950s, the bilateral alliance grew stronger. The two countries signed the Mutual Defence Assistance Agreement in May 1954, opening the door for significant military and financial support from the United States. Pakistan's integration was strengthened when it formally joined the US-sponsored Southeast Asia Treaty Organization (SEATO) and Central Treaty Organization (CENTO) alliances. A later Bilateral Agreement of Cooperation, signed in 1959, gave Washington access to military installations in Pakistan. Notably, this agreement permitted the Central Intelligence Agency (CIA) to run a U-2 spy plane reconnaissance base from Peshawar in order to monitor on Soviet activity.

The alliance reached its most crucial stage after the Soviet invasion of Afghanistan in December 1979. Facing a shared threat, the Jimmy Carter and Ronald Reagan administrations bypassed existing nuclear proliferation sanctions to fund a massive covert operation alongside Pakistan's Inter-Services Intelligence (ISI). Throughout the 1980s, they worked together to finance, arm, and train anti-communist Afghan mujahideen to resist Soviet occupation under Operation Cyclone.

- 1954 Mutual Defence Pact:

Established the Pakistan Armed Forces' basic military hardware supply pipelines.

- U-2 Reconnaissance Base (1956):

CIA used facilities in Peshawar until the 1960 U-2 shootdown incident in 1960.

- Operation Cyclone (1979–1989): A multibillion-dollar joint pipeline run through Pakistan to fund the Afghan resistance.

=== 21st century relations ===
==== September 2001 and after ====
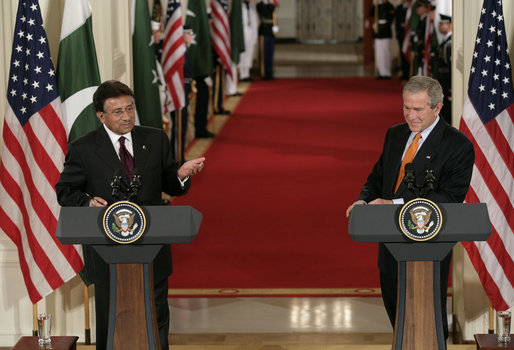
Pervez Musharraf with President Bush in 2006

After the September 11 attacks in 2001 in the United States, Pakistan became a key ally in the war on terror with the United States. In 2001, US President George W. Bush pressured the government into joining the US the war on terror. Pervez Musharraf acknowledges the payments received for capturing suspects in his book:

We've captured 689 and handed over 369 to the United States. We've earned bounties totaling millions of dollars

— Former Prime Minister of Pakistan Pervez Musharraf, in

In October 2005, Condoleezza Rice made a statement where she promised that the United States will support the country's earthquake relief efforts and help it rebuild" after the Kashmir earthquake.

=== Alliance with United States ===
Pakistan became a crucial regional ally in the US-led war on terror after the September 11 attacks. For Operation Enduring Freedom in Afghanistan, President Pervez Musharraf consented to grant the U.S. military overflight rights, intelligence sharing, and logistical support.

The United States lifted the remaining nuclear-related sanctions under the Pressler Amendment and offered significant financial and military support in return for this strategic cooperation. In 2004, President George W. Bush designated Pakistan as a Major non-NATO ally (MNNA), allowing it to purchase advanced American defense equipment and participate in joint military research initiatives.

Despite the official alliance, the relationship remained complicated and was often described as a "roller coaster" because of strong bilateral disagreements over regional security objectives and claims of militant safe havens in the border regions.

==== Aid from the United States since 9/11 ====
Pakistan is a major non-NATO ally as part of the war on terrorism, and a leading recipient of U.S. aid. Between 2002 and 2013, Pakistan received $26 billion in economic and military aid and sales of military equipment. The equipment included eighteen new F-16 aircraft, eight P-3C Orion maritime patrol aircraft, 6,000 TOW anti-tank missiles, 500 AMRAM air-to-air missiles, 6 C-130 transport aircraft, 20 Cobra attack helicopters, and a Perry-class missile frigate. About half of the aid package was disbursed during the Bush administration and other half during the Obama administration. The aid during the Obama administration was more economic than military.

==== Trust deficit issues ====
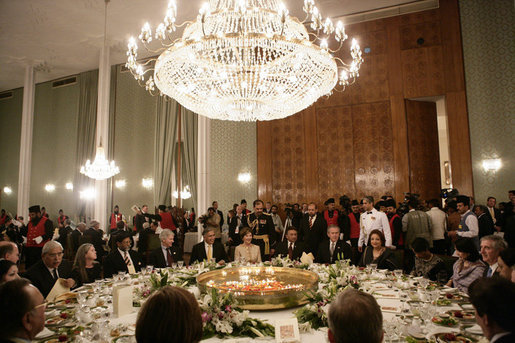
The leadership of both nations meeting in a high-level state dinner in Islamabad, 2006.

In 2008, NSA Director Mike McConnell confronted ISI Director Ahmad Shuja Pasha, claiming that the ISI was tipping off jihadists so that they could escape in advance of American attacks against them.

On 11 June 2008, the Gora Prai airstrike, on the Afghan-Pakistani border, killed 10 members of the paramilitary Frontier Corps. The Pakistani military condemned the airstrike as an act of aggression, souring the relations between the two countries. However, after the drone attacks in June, President Bush had said 'Pakistan is strong ally '. Western officials have claimed nearly 70%( roughly $3.4 billion) of the aid given to the Pakistani military has been misspent in 2002–2007. However U.S.-Pakistani relationship has been a transactional based and US military aid to Pakistan has been shrouded in secrecy for several years until recently. Furthermore, a significant proportion of US economic aid for Pakistan has ended up back in the US as funds are channeled through large US contractors. US Representative Gary Ackerman also said a large sum of US economic aid has not left the US as it spent on consulting fees and overhead cost.

Following the November 2008 Mumbai Attacks, which was committed by Lashkar-e-Taiba, a Pakistan-based militant organization, the United States informed the Government of Pakistan that it expected full cooperation in the hunt for the plotters of the attacks.

The American politicians at the U.S. Congress publicly accused Pakistan of harboring of Osama bin Laden, Afghan Taliban and their "Quetta Shura" while the lawmakers in the Pakistani Parliament leveled serious accusations at the Americans doing very little to control the porous eastern border of Afghanistan, where Pakistan's most-wanted terrorist, Mullah Fazlullah and his organization were believed to be hiding.

==== Border engagement and skirmishes ====
The United States and Pakistan have experienced several military confrontations on the Afghanistan-Pakistan border. These skirmishes took place between American forces deployed in Afghanistan, and Pakistani troops guarding the border. On November 26, 2011, 28 Pakistani soldiers were killed in an aerial attack on Pakistani positions near the border. The attack further damaged US-Pakistani relations with many in Pakistan calling for a more hardline stance against the United States.

Following the incident, US Secretary of State Hillary Clinton, and Defense Secretary Leon Panetta spoke to their Pakistani counterparts to give their "deepest condolences" in a joint statement and also supported a NATO investigation. A NATO spokesman also said that NATO "regrets the loss of life of any Pakistani servicemen".

==== 2009: U.S. military and economic aid ====
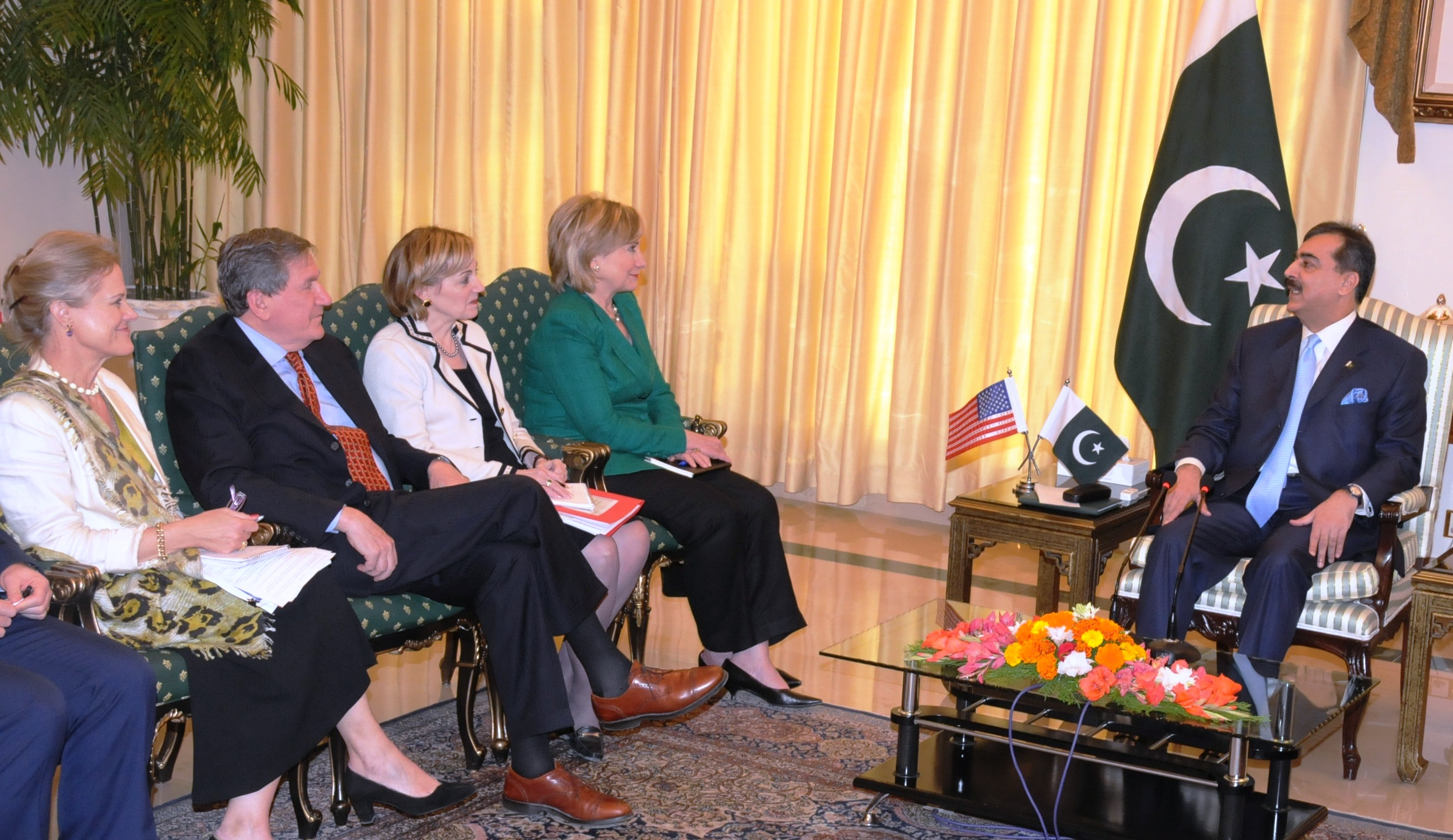
Secretary of State Hillary Clinton attending meeting with then Prime Minister Raza Gillani during an October 2009 visit to Islamabad.

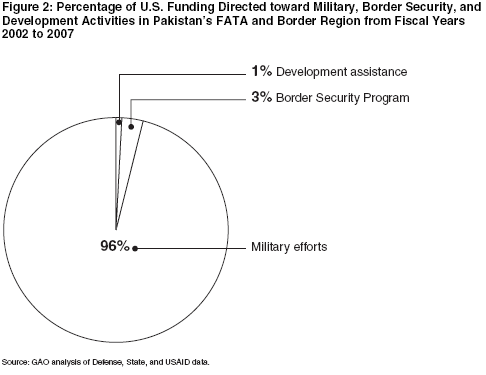
Circular diagram showing 96% of U.S. funding to Pakistan in military efforts and 1% in development efforts.

On 14 September 2009, former President of Pakistan, Pervez Musharraf, admitted that American foreign aid to Pakistan had been diverted from its original purpose of fighting the Taliban to preparing for war against neighboring India. The United States government has responded by stating that it will take these allegations seriously. However Pervez Musharraf also said, '"Wherever there is a threat to Pakistan, we will use it [the equipment] there. If the threat comes from al-Qaeda or Taliban, it will be used there. If the threat comes from India, we will most surely use it there."

In late 2009, Hillary Clinton made a speech in Pakistan about the war against the militants and said: "...we commend the Pakistani military for their courageous fight, and we commit to stand shoulder to shoulder with the Pakistani people in your fight for peace and security."

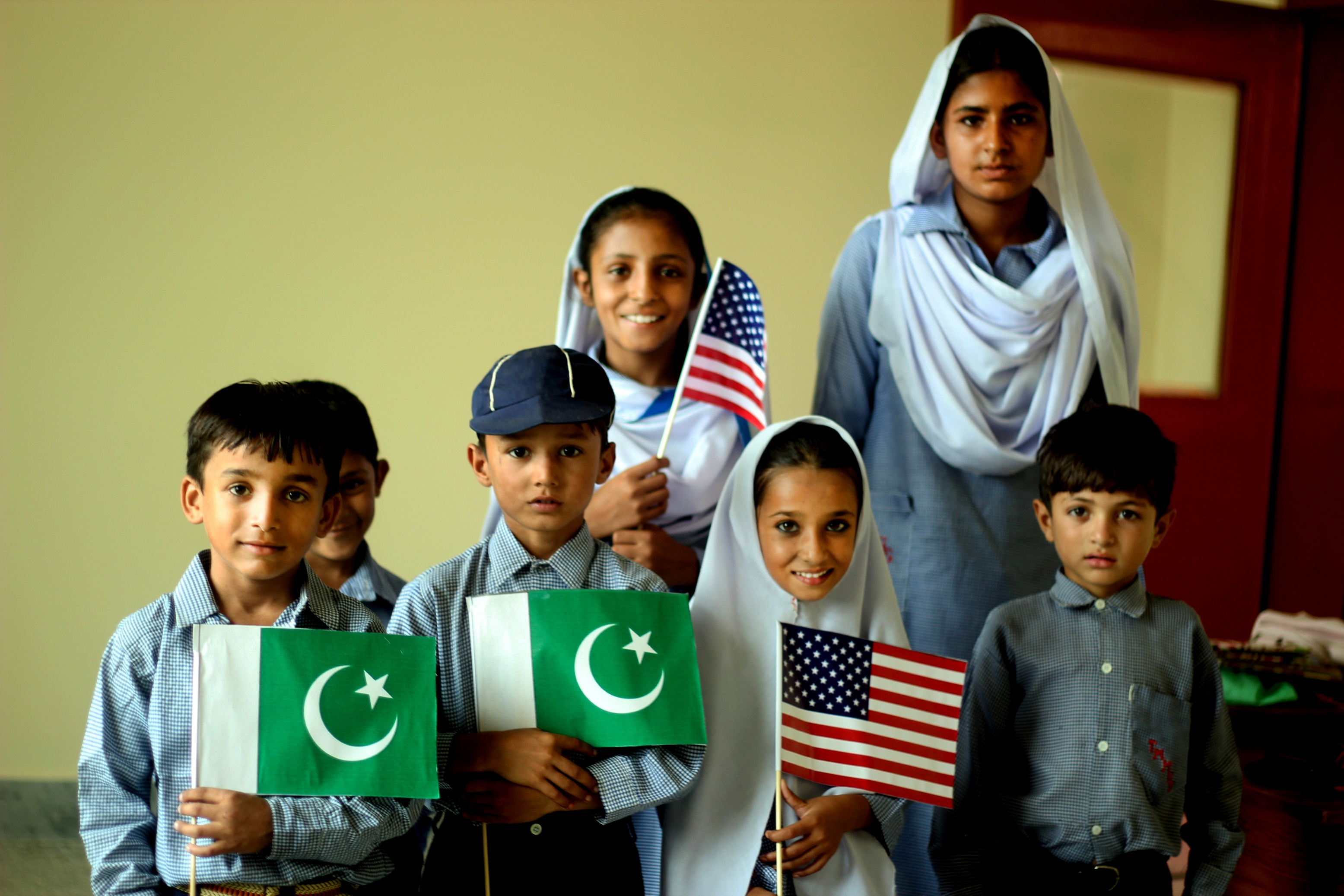
The Pakistani school children holding U.S. and Pakistan flags at the completion of USAID funded school in rural Pakistan.

In October 2009, the US Congress approved $7.5 billion of non-military aid to Pakistan over the next five years via the Kerry-Lugar Bill. In February 2010, US President Barack Obama sought to increase funds to Pakistan to "promote economic and political stability in strategically important regions where the United States has special security interests". Obama also sought $3.1 billion aid for Pakistan to defeat Al Qaeda for 2010.

On December 1, 2009, President Barack Obama in a speech on a policy about Pakistan said "In the past, we too often defined our relationship with Pakistan narrowly. Those days are over.... The Pakistani people must know America will remain a strong supporter of Pakistan's security and prosperity long after the guns have fallen silent so that the great potential of its people can be unleashed." President Obama also said, "In the past, we too often defined our relationship with Pakistan narrowly, those days are over. Moving forward, we are committed to a partnership with Pakistan that is built on a foundation of mutual interests, mutual respect and mutual trust" and that the two countries "share a common enemy' in combating Islamic extremism."

In the aftermath of a thwarted bombing attempt on a 2009 Northwest Airlines flight, the U.S. Transportation Security Administration (TSA) issued a new set of screening guidelines that includes pat-downs for passengers from countries of interest, which includes Pakistan. In a sign of widening fissures between the two allies, on January 21, Pakistan declined a request by the United States to launch new offensives on militants in 2010. Pakistan say it "can't launch any new offensives against militants for six months to a year because it wants to 'stabilize' previous gains made. However, the US praises Pakistan's military effort against the militants. Furthermore, Pakistan president, in meeting with the U.S. delegation, had said Pakistan "had suffered a... loss of over 35 billion dollars during the last eight years as a result of the fight against militancy." But the President also called for "greater Pak-U.S. cooperation".

==== 2010: Coalition partnership issues ====
In February 2010, Anne W. Patterson (U.S. Ambassador to Pakistan) said that the United States is committed to a partnership with Pakistan and further said "Making this commitment to Pakistan while the U.S. is still recovering from the effects of the global recession reflects the strength of our vision. Yet we have made this commitment, because we see the success of Pakistan, its economy, its civil society and its democratic institutions as important for ourselves, for this region and for the world."

Between 2002 and 2010, Pakistan received approximately $18 billion in military and economic aid from the United States. In February 2010, the Obama administration requested an additional $3 billion in aid, for a total of $20.7 billion.

In mid-February 2010, after the capture of the second most powerful Taliban, Abdul Ghani Baradar in Pakistan by Pakistani forces, the White House hailed the operation. Furthermore, White House Press Secretary Robert Gibbs said that this is a "big success for our mutual efforts(Pakistan and United States)in the region" and praised Pakistan for the capture, saying it was a sign of increased cooperation with the US in the terror fight.

In March, Richard Holbrooke, then US special envoy to Pakistan, said that US-Pakistani relations have seen "significant improvement" under Obama. He also said, "No government on earth has received more high-level attention" than Pakistan.

==== 2011: American accusations and attacks in Pakistan ====
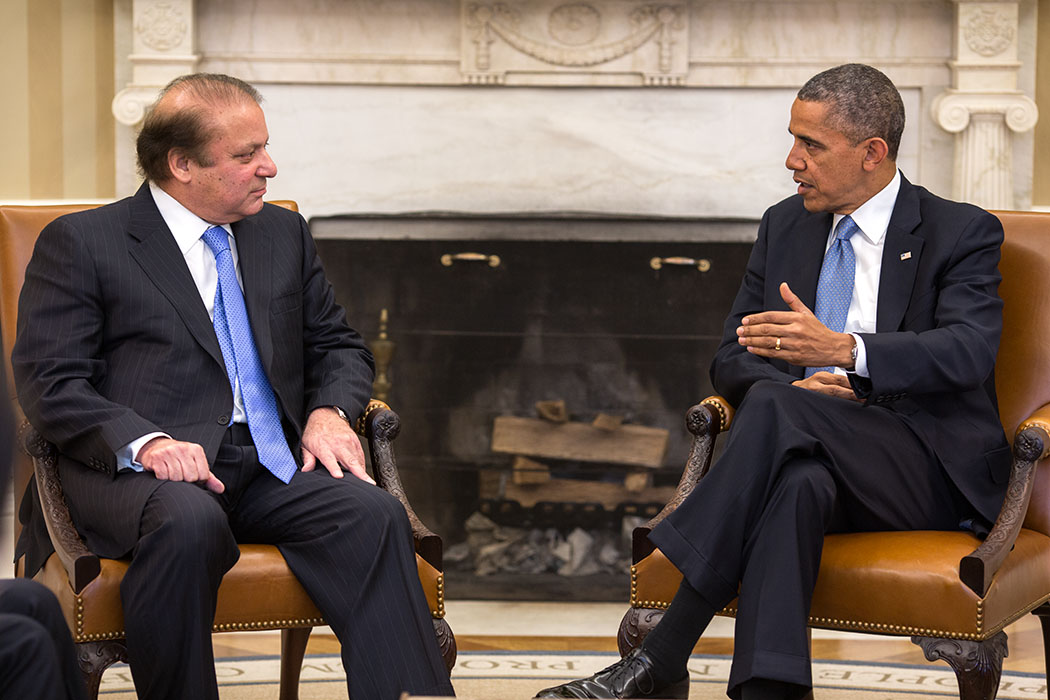
U.S. President Obama and Prime Minister Nawaz Sharif

2011 was rated by the BBC as a "disastrous year" for Pakistan-U.S. relations, primarily due to three events: the Raymond Allen Davis incident, the death of Osama bin Laden and the Salala incident. As early as 2005, Western criticism against Pakistan grew and many European and American political correspondents criticized Pakistan at the public level. The London-based The Economist in fact observed: "As an American ally, Pakistan has become an embarrassment for the United States." In January 2011, the Raymond Allen Davis incident occurred in which Raymond Davis, an alleged private security contractor, shot dead two Pakistani locals. The action sparked protests in Pakistan and threatened relations between the United States and Pakistan, including aid flows. Pakistan prosecuted him despite US demands for him to be freed because he enjoys diplomatic immunity. Ultimately he was freed after the United States made payments to the families of the slain Pakistanis, but the incident was emblematic of the volatile nature of American-Pakistani relations. In spite of this rocky relationship, the United States has stated that it remains committed to assisting Pakistan's new democratic government in the areas of development, stability, and security.

The CIA had long suspected Osama bin Laden of hiding in Pakistan. India and US have also accused Pakistan of giving safe-haven to the Taliban. However, Pakistan has repeatedly denied these accusations.

The attack on the US embassy and the NATO headquarters in Kabul were blamed on the Haqqani Network, which US Admiral Mike Mullen called "a veritable arm of Pakistan's Inter-Services Intelligence Agency." Pakistan reacted by recalling its finance minister who was on a visit to the U.N. Pakistan also tried to strengthen the relationship with China and Saudi Arabia to counter the U.S. The Chinese government advised Pakistan against any commitments that could jeopardize China's relationships with US and India. The United States reissued a call urging Pakistan to act against the Haqqani Network or else the US would be forced to take on the threat unilaterally. Islamic groups in Pakistan, issued a fatwa proclaiming Jihad against the US. This was followed by Pakistan threatening the US with retaliation, if the US went ahead with unilateral action against the Haqqani network.

In May 2011, Pakistani journalist Saleem Shahzad was killed and in September, The New Yorker reported that the order to kill Shahzad came from an officer on General Kayani's staff. In July Admiral Mullen alleged that Shahzad's killing had been "sanctioned by the government" of Pakistan, but the ISI denied any involvement in the Shahzad murder.

It was reported in 2011 that academics and journalists in the United States have been approached by Inter-Services Intelligence spies, who threatened them not to speak about the Balochistan independence movement, as well as human rights abuses by the Pakistani Army, or else their families would be harmed.

===== Collapse of alliance and death of Osama bin Laden =====
Diagram of Osama bin Laden's hideout, showing the high concrete walls that surround the compound

Osama bin Laden, then head of the militant group al-Qaeda, was killed in Pakistan on May 2, 2011, shortly after 1 a.m. local time by a United States special forces military unit. The operation, codenamed Operation Neptune Spear, was ordered by United States President Barack Obama and carried out in a US Central Intelligence Agency (CIA) operation by a team of United States Navy SEALs from the United States Naval Special Warfare Development Group (also known as DEVGRU or informally by its former name, SEAL Team Six) of the Joint Special Operations Command, with support from CIA operatives on the ground.

According to Obama administration officials, US officials did not share information about the raid with the government of Pakistan until it was over. Chairman of the Joint Chiefs of Staff Michael Mullen called Pakistan's army chief Ashfaq Parvez Kayani at about 3 a.m. local time to inform him of the Abbottabad Operation.

According to the Pakistani foreign ministry, the operation was conducted entirely by US forces. Pakistan Inter-Services Intelligence (ISI) officials said they were also present at what they called a joint operation; President Asif Ali Zardari flatly denied this. Pakistan's foreign secretary Salman Bashir later confirmed that Pakistani military had scrambled F-16s after they became aware of the attack but that they reached the compound after American helicopters had left.

==== 2012–13: American sentiment against Pakistan ====
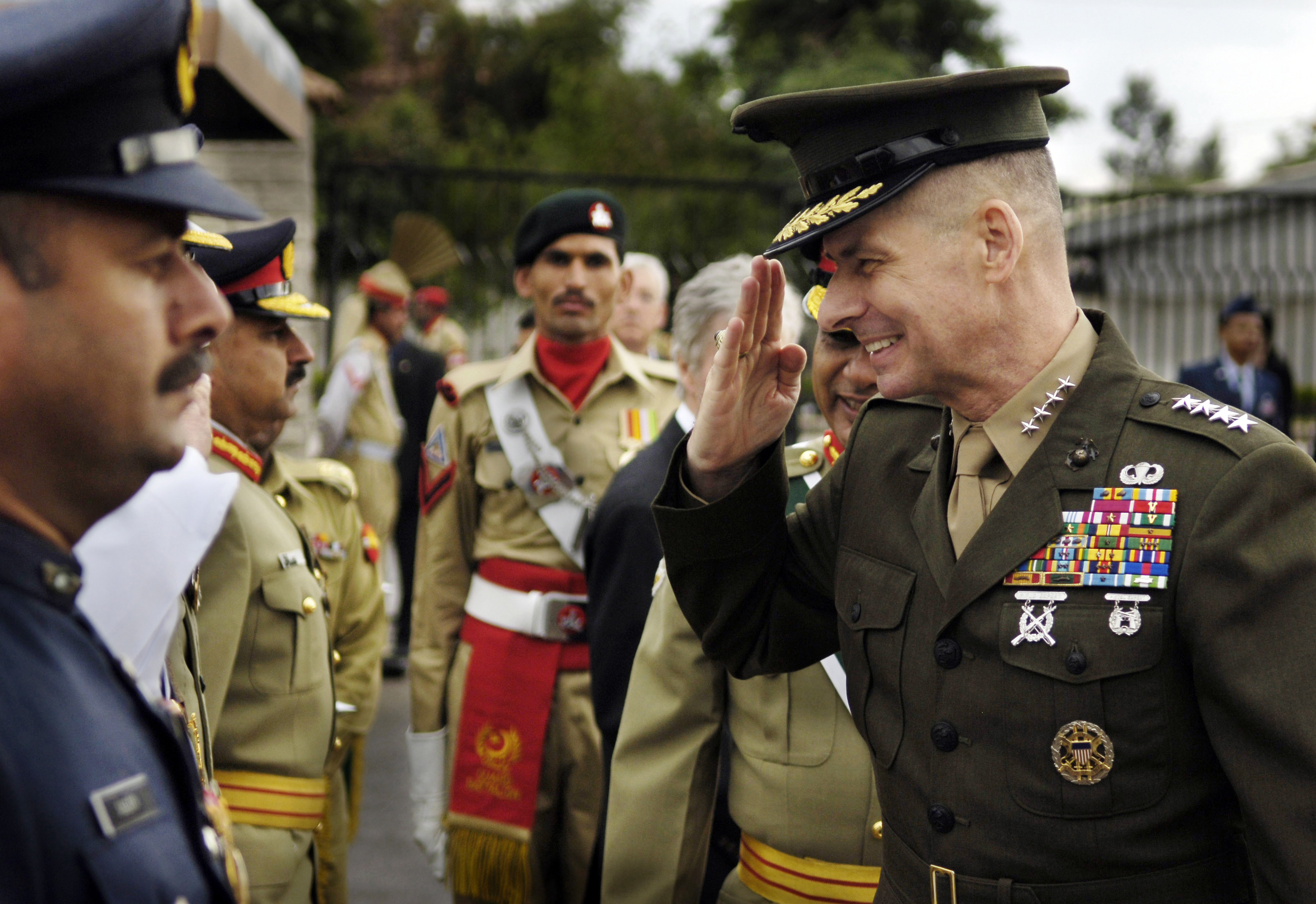
American Chairman of Joint Chiefs Peter Pace seen saluting the Pakistan's inter-services in Islamabad.

Since some in the U.S. government claimed that they had caught bin Laden without Pakistani help, numerous allegations were made that the government of Pakistan had shielded bin Laden. Critics cited the very close proximity of bin Laden's heavily fortified compound to the Pakistan Military Academy, that the US chose not to notify Pakistani authorities before the operation and the double standards of Pakistan regarding the perpetrators of the 2008 Mumbai attacks.

However, according to Steve Coll, as of 2019 there is no direct evidence showing Pakistani knowledge of bin Laden's presence in Abbottabad, even by a rogue or compartmented faction within the government, other than the circumstantial fact of bin Laden's compound being located near (albeit not directly visible from) the Pakistan Military Academy. Documents captured from the Abbottabad compound generally show that bin Laden was wary of contact with Pakistani intelligence and police, especially in light of Pakistan's role in the arrest of Khalid Sheikh Mohammed; it has also been suggested that the $25 million U.S. reward for information leading to bin Laden would have been enticing to Pakistani officers given their reputation for corruption. The compound itself, although unusually tall, was less conspicuous than sometimes envisaged by Americans, given the common local habit of walling off homes for protection against violence or to ensure the privacy of female family members.

According to the leaked files, in December 2009, the government of Tajikistan had also told US officials that many in Pakistan were aware of bin Laden's whereabouts.

CIA chief Leon Panetta said the CIA had ruled out involving Pakistan in the operation, because it feared that "any effort to work with the Pakistanis could jeopardize the mission. They might alert the targets." However, Secretary of State Hillary Clinton stated that "cooperation with Pakistan helped lead us to bin Laden and the compound in which he was hiding." Obama echoed her sentiments. John O. Brennan, Obama's chief counterterrorism advisor, said that it was inconceivable that bin Laden did not have support from within Pakistan. He further stated, "People have been referring to this as hiding in plain sight. We are looking at how he was able to hide out there for so long."

In 2012, Shakil Afridi, a doctor who had set up a fake vaccination campaign – in cooperation with the United States in searching for Al Qaeda and bin Laden – was convicted of treason by Pakistan, and sentenced to 33 years in prison. The United States Congress voted to cut 33 million dollars in aid to Pakistan: 1 million dollars for every year that Shakil Afridi was sentenced to prison. The role of Dr. Afridi was exposed by the British newspaper The Guardian in July 2011. CIA's fake vaccination campaign in turned greatly harmed Pakistan polio vaccine drive in the tribal areas. Experts have criticised the CIA's fake vaccination drive to find bin Laden, stating that there could have been a better and more ethical way to find bin Laden.

==== 2014 and 2015: Rapprochement ====
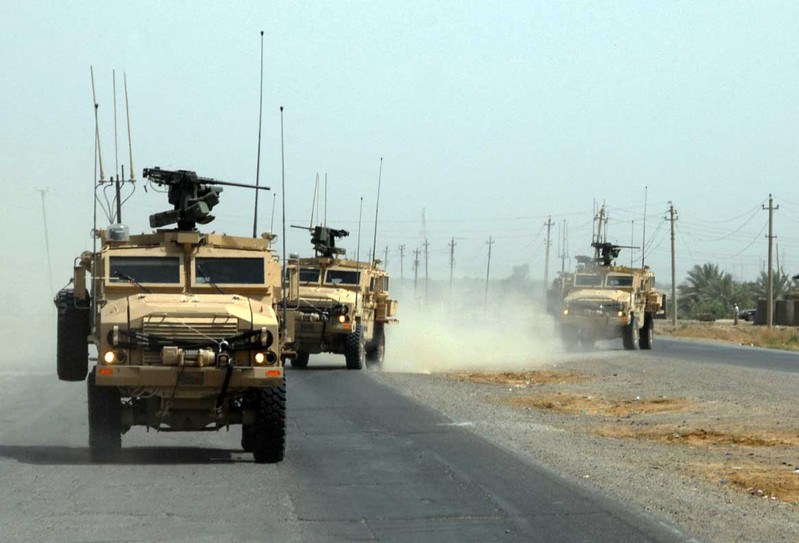
In 2015, US handed over MRAPs to Pakistan.

Following years of poor inter-governmental relations, the two countries began to cooperate more closely – particularly following the United States' use of drone missiles to strike at Pakistan's most-wanted militant Mullah Fazlullah on November 24, 2014, whom they "narrowly missed". The United States later used drone missiles to kill several of Pakistan's most wanted militants who were hiding in a remote region close to the Afghan border in November 2014. The Pakistani Zarb-e-Azb operation against militants in North Waziristan also, in the words of Lt. Gen. Joseph Anderson, "fractured" the Haqqani Network—long accused by the United States of having a safe harbor in Pakistan. The United States then captured and transferred a senior Taliban commander, Latif Mehsud, to Pakistan, which had been seeking his arrest. Following an unprecedented two-week-long visit by Pakistan's most senior military official Gen. Raheel Sharif, Rep. Adam Schiff stated that US-Pakistani relations were on the upswing following several tense years of dysfunction. Pakistan further killed senior Al-Qaeda leader Adnan el Shukrijumah—long wanted by the United States. Warming of relations, and increased security cooperation, between Afghanistan and Pakistan were also positive developments by the United States, which had long tried to mend relations between the two countries.

On 7 May 2015, according to an internal report prepared by Congressional Research Service, Pakistan has made full payment from its national funds towards the purchase of 18 new F-16C/D Fighting Falcon Block 52 combat aircraft worth US$1.43 billion. Also including F-16 armaments including 500 AMRAAM air-to-air missiles; 1,450 2,000-pound bombs; 500 JDAM Tail Kits for gravity bombs; and 1,600 Enhanced Paveway laser-guided kits. All this has cost Pakistan US$629 million. Pakistan has also paid US$298 million for 100 harpoon anti-ship missiles, 500 sidewinder air-to-air missiles (US$95 million); and seven Phalanx Close-In Weapons System naval guns (US$80 million). Under Coalition Support Funds (in the Pentagon budget), Pakistan received 26 Bell 412EP utility helicopters, along with related parts and maintenance, valued at US$235 million.

On February 11, 2016, US government has proposed US$860 million in aid for Pakistan during the 2016–17 fiscal year, including $265 million for military hardware in addition to counterinsurgency funds.

==== From 2017 to 2020: Gradual alienation ====
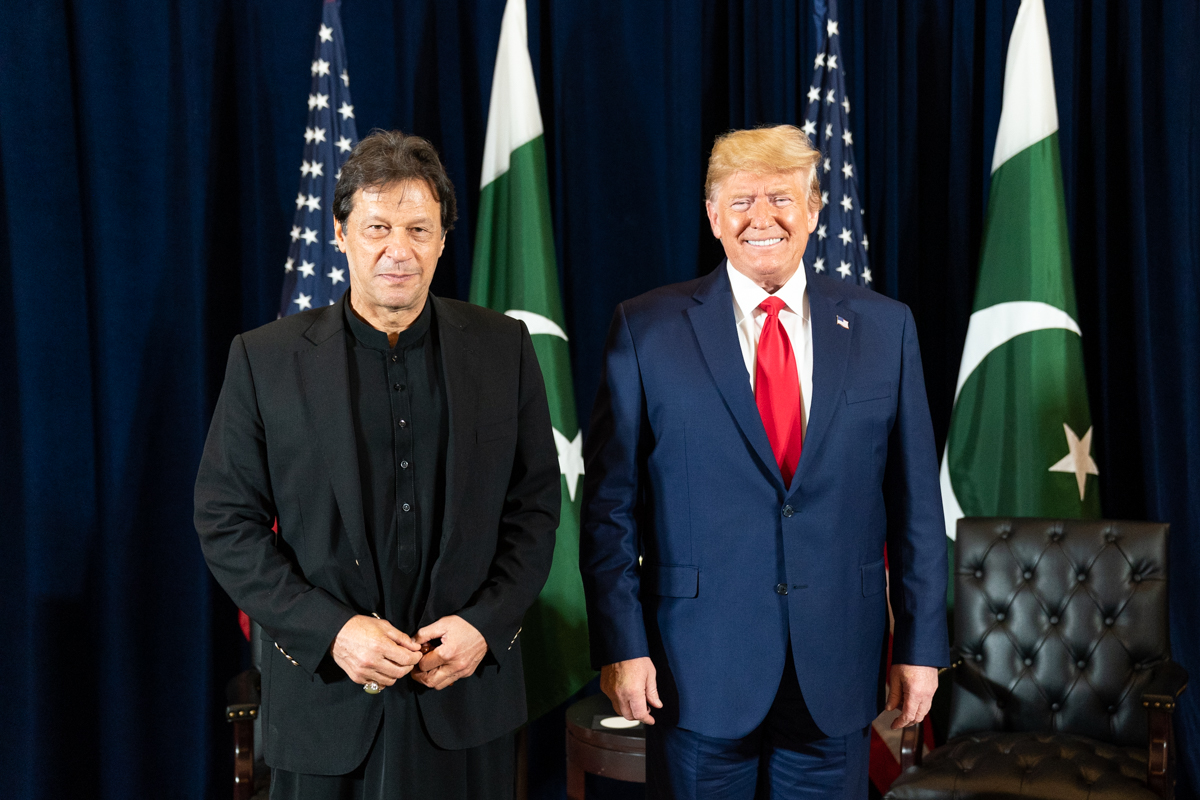
Former Prime Minister Imran Khan with U.S. President Donald Trump in 2019

On August 21, 2017, Donald Trump announced his new strategy for Afghan War and accused Pakistan of providing safe havens to terrorists. "The Pakistani people have suffered greatly from terrorism and extremism. We recognize those contributions and those sacrifices, but Pakistan has also sheltered the same organizations that try every single day to kill our people", Trump said. Moreover, Trump also urged India for its role in the war. Trump's speech led to rise of anti-American sentiments in Pakistan and protests against Trump were held across the country. Two months later, Trump tweeted that he was starting to develop better relations with the Pakistani government.

On January 1, 2018, Donald Trump again criticized Pakistan, saying "they have given us nothing but lies and deceit". President Trump also announced cancelling a $300 million disbursement to Pakistan, citing the country's failure to take strong actions against Afghan Taliban militants and their safe havens in Pakistan. In February 2018, the Trump administration moved to change Pakistan's status into 'Grey List' of the Financial Action Task Force (FATF), pressuring Pakistan to take action against terrorist financing in its territory.

However, the relations between the two countries improved after Pakistani Prime Minister Imran Khan visited United States and met President Donald Trump. Many experts viewed Khan's visit to United States as 'reset in the bilateral relationship between the two countries'. President Trump called for dramatically strengthening trade ties between Pakistan and the United States as America is a top export destination for Pakistan. President Trump also offered to mediate between India and Pakistan on Kashmir. However, Trump's offer was immediately rejected by Indian foreign office.

In September 2019, during a joint rally at Houston, Trump refused to endorse India's repeated allegations against Pakistan. After the joint rally, Trump called himself a 'friend' of Pakistan and termed Imran Khan as a 'great leader'.

In January 2020, President Trump once again held a meeting with Prime Minister Khan in Davos, on the sidelines of the World Economic Forum. President Trump hailed the growing relationship between the United States and Pakistan. He said that United States has never been closer with Pakistan than it is currently under his administration. This was the third meeting between the two countries and Trump once again offered to mediate on Kashmir issue. His remarks were welcomed by Prime Minister Khan.

==== After U.S. withdrawal from Afghanistan ====
U.S. "clearly distanced" itself from Pakistan after the United States troops withdraws Afghanistan in 2021, Imran Khan describing it as Afghans breaking "the shackles of slavery". Pakistan declined an invitation to America's 'Summit for Democracy' under the Biden administration.

During the 2022 Pakistani constitutional crisis, Imran Khan blamed the US official Donald Lu and named the United States as the country in question over a "threatening letter", warns American "regime change" led to his downfall. During the start of the Russo-Ukrainian war, Imran Khan paid a visit to Russia and responded to a rally, he said "Are we your slaves? What do you think of us? That we are your slaves and that we will do whatever you ask of us? We are friends of Russia, and we are also friends of the United States. We are friends of China and Europe. We are not part of any alliance."

In a statement released at the end of the 'Fourth Annual US-India 2+2 Ministerial Dialogue', the United States and India call on Pakistan to take "irreversible action" to ensure that its soil is not used for terrorist attacks against any other country.

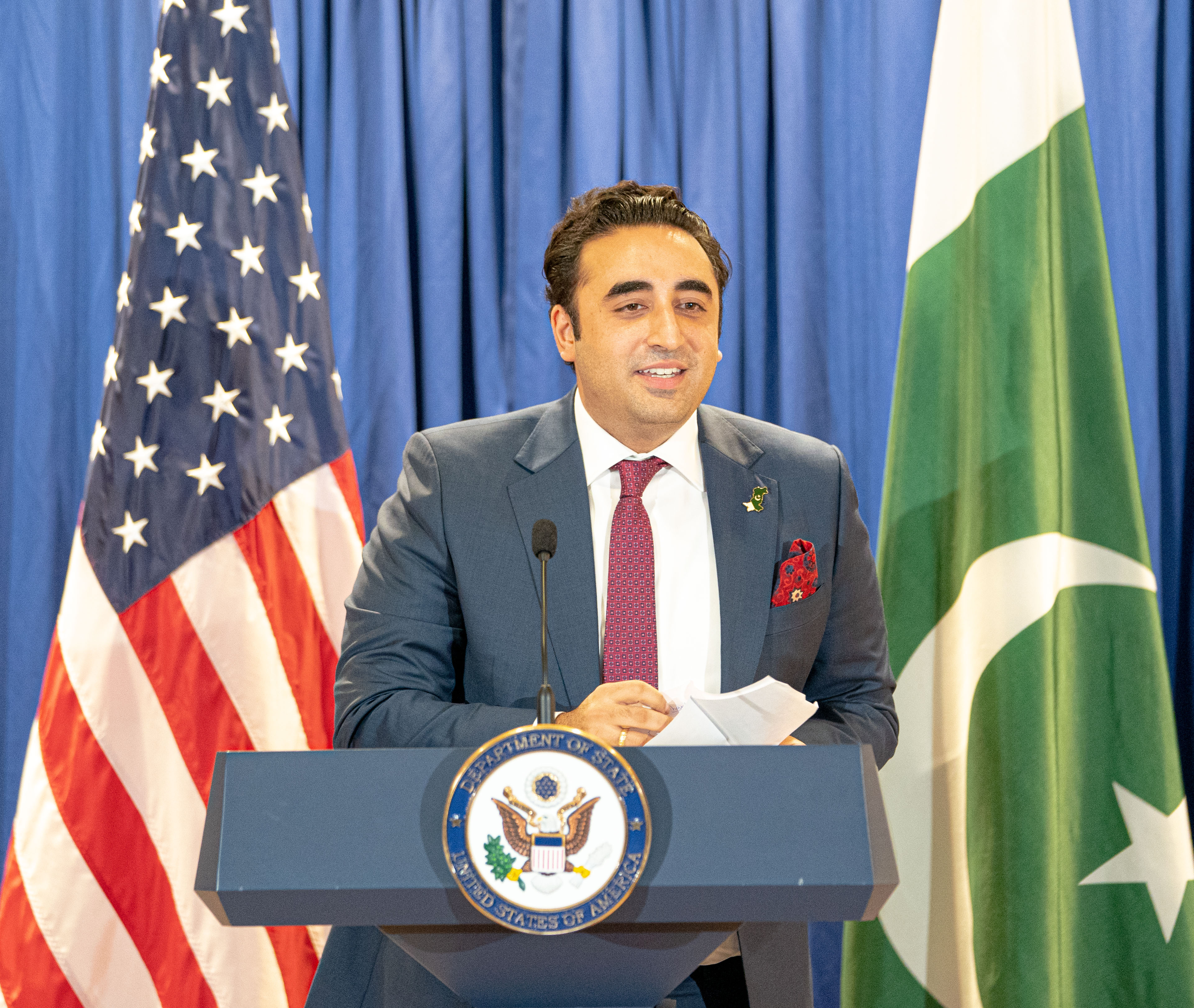
Pakistani Foreign Minister (2022–2023) Bilawal Bhutto Zardari delivers remarks to U.S. diplomats.

In October 2022, U.S. President Joe Biden called Pakistan "one of the most dangerous nations in the world" during an address in California while speaking about the changing global geopolitical situation. Pakistani Prime Minister Shehbaz Sharif and Foreign Minister Bilawal Bhutto Zardari rejected the statement as baseless, and the country's acting foreign secretary summoned the U.S. ambassador for an explanation of Biden's remarks.

Since the Pakistani government decided to import Russian oil in 2023, Dawn claimed the United States had demonstrated positive relations with Pakistan by allowing them to purchase oil from Russia at a discounted price, despite not signing a Washington-backed price cap on Russian petroleum products.

In April 2023, a secret memo written by Pakistani Minister of State for Foreign Affairs Hina Rabbani Khar was leaked to the press where she called for prioritizing ties with China over appeasing the U.S. within the context of the U.S.-China geopolitical rivalry.

In response to the crackdown on former Prime Minister Imran Khan, Pakistani-American advocacy groups were mobilizing members of the US Congress to issue statements against human rights abuses in Pakistan, further estranging the bilateral relationship.

In August 2023, according to a leaked diplomatic cable at the March 7, 2022 meeting from Pakistan received by The Intercept, US State department encouraged removal of Imran Khan owing to his neutral stance on the Russian invasion of Ukraine. CNN reports that most Pakistanis believe the US was involved in a plot against Imran Khan.

==== Relations after the 2024 elections in Pakistan ====
The 2024 Pakistani general election on 8 February 2024 was allegedly rigged by the military establishment, and the veracity of the results were questioned by the United States Department of State, who called for an investigation into its fairness.

On March 29, 2024, President Biden wrote to Prime Minister Shehbaz Sharif, affirming Washington's support for Pakistan in addressing global and regional challenges. This marked the first official correspondence between a U.S. president and a Pakistani Prime Minister in several years.

Earlier in the same month, Democratic lawmakers urged President Biden and Secretary of State Antony Blinken to delay recognition of the new Pakistani government until thorough investigations into election irregularities were completed. They cited evidence of violations and disruptions on election day.

On 19 December 2024, a senior White House official said Pakistan is developing long-range ballistic missile capabilities that eventually could allow it to strike targets well beyond South Asia, making it an "emerging threat" to the United States. Pakistan denounced US sanctions on its missile program as "discriminatory".

In October 2024, the Islamabad Policy Research Institute (IPRI), a national security think tank based in Pakistan, hired the U.S. lobbying firm Team Eagle Consulting for $1.5 million annually to strengthen U.S.-Pakistan relations. Led by Stephen Payne, the firm's engagement was registered under the U.S. Foreign Agents Registration Act and was seen as an effort to counter the influence of PTI supporters lobbying for the release of former Prime Minister Imran Khan.

Madiha Afzal, writing for the Lawfare Institute in collaboration with the Brookings Institution, argues that Pakistan's importance to the United States has significantly diminished following the U.S. withdrawal from Afghanistan, which ended the primary basis for bilateral engagement centered on counterterrorism and military cooperation. She notes that the relationship has settled into a low-level equilibrium marked by limited agency-level engagement and minimal White House interest, exemplified by President Biden never calling his Pakistani counterpart and offering only a brief letter after Pakistan's contentious 2024 election. Afzal observes that the United States has largely refrained from commenting on Pakistan's troubled democracy, offering only muted concern about the flawed election, while pointing instead to domestic institutions such as the judiciary and election commission to resolve disputes. She argues that Pakistan lacks a compelling strategic narrative, political stability, or economic growth to justify increased U.S. attention, making a robust bilateral relationship unlikely in the foreseeable future.

==== Relations under second Donald Trump presidency (2025-present) ====
After years of strained relations during the post-9/11 era, the ties underwent a structural economic and diplomatic shift. In mid-2025, Pakistani Finance Minister Muhammad Aurangzeb visited Washington, D.C., to finalize negotiations with U.S. Trade Representative Jamieson Greer. As a result, the United States and Pakistan signed a reciprocal trade agreement in July 2025 that established shared exploration agreements in the mining and energy sectors and lowered U.S. tariffs on Pakistani manufacturing exports. By August 2026, the two countries had made further progress toward expanding concessions under this reciprocal trade framework.

During the 2026 Iran war, Pakistan established itself as a key diplomatic mediator in addition to economic agreements. Pakistan used its unique diplomatic footprint with both Washington and Tehran to host high-level delegations during the Islamabad Talks, which aimed to broker a regional truce. The Islamabad Memorandum, which established a strategic pause to temporarily halt military operations and secure commercial shipping routes through the Strait of Hormuz, was successfully drafted and remotely signed in June 2026 despite the difficulties encountered during the direct talks.

== Meetings between Pakistani and U.S. leaders ==
=== Visits by leaders of Pakistan ===
Visitor	Date	Description
Prime Minister Liaquat Ali Khan	May 3–5, 1950	Official visit. Afterward visited New York City, Chicago, San Francisco, Los Angeles, Houston, New Orleans (Louisiana), Schenectady (New York), and Boston (Massachusetts). Departed U.S. May 30.
Governor General Malik Ghulam Muhammad	November 8–13, 1953	Met with President Eisenhower after obtaining medical treatment in Boston.
Prime Minister Muhammad Ali Bogra	October 14–21, 1954	Official guest.
Prime Minister Huseyn Shaheed Suhrawardy	July 10–13, 1957	Official visit. Afterward visited Colorado Springs (Colorado), the Grand Canyon (Arizona), Los Angeles, San Francisco, Salt Lake City (Utah), Omaha (Nebraska), Detroit (Michigan), and New York City. Departed U.S. July 27.
President Field Marshal Ayub Khan	July 11–14, 1961	State visit. Addressed U.S. Congress July 12. Afterward visited New York City, Gettysburg (Pennsylvania), San Antonio, Austin, and the LBJ Ranch (Texas). Departed U.S. July 18.
President Field Marshal Ayub Khan	September 24, 1962	Informal meeting at Newport (Rhode Island). Afterward visited Washington and New York City. Departed U.S. September 27.
President Field Marshal Ayub Khan	December 14–16, 1965	State visit. Arrived in U.S. December 12; visited New York City.
President General Yahya Khan	October 24–25, 1970	Attended White House dinner on 25th Anniversary of the U.N; met privately with Richard Nixon on October 25.
Prime Minister Zulfikar Ali Bhutto	September 18–20, 1973	Official visit. In U.S. September 17–24; visited Williamsburg, San Francisco, and New York City.
Prime Minister Zulfikar Ali Bhutto	February 4–7, 1975	Official visit. Afterward visited New York City. Departed U.S. February 8.
President Muhammad Zia-ul-Haq	October 3, 1980	Private visit while attending U.N. General Assembly session.
President Muhammad Zia-ul-Haq	December 6–9, 1982	State visit; visited New York City, Houston, Sacramento, and San Francisco. Departed U.S. December 14.
President Muhammad Zia-ul-Haq	October 23, 1985	Met with President Reagan in New York City at reception and luncheon at the U.N.
Prime Minister Muhammad Khan Junejo	July 15–18, 1986	Official Visit; visited Orlando (Fla.) and New York City. Departed U.S. July 22.
Prime Minister Benazir Bhutto	June 5–7, 1989	Official Visit; visited Boston and New York City. Departed U.S. June 10.
President Farooq Leghari	May 23–27, 1994	Arrived in U.S. May 21; departed June 1. Also visited Rochester, NY. Met with President Bill Clinton during a private visit. Later visited New York City.
Prime Minister Benazir Bhutto	April 9–11, 1995	Official working visit. Arrived in the U.S. April 5; also visited New York City and Los Angeles. Departed the U.S. April 14.
Prime Minister Nawaz Sharif	September 22, 1997	Met with President Bill Clinton at the UN General Assembly in New York City.
Prime Minister Nawaz Sharif	September 21, 1998	Met with President Clinton at the U.N. General Assembly in New York City.
Prime Minister Nawaz Sharif	December 1, 1998	Official working visit.
Prime Minister Nawaz Sharif	July 4–5, 1999	Discussed the Kashmir conflict with President Bill Clinton during a private visit.
President Pervez Musharraf	November 10, 2001	Met with George W. Bush at the UN General Assembly in New York City.
President Pervez Musharraf	February 12–14, 2002	Official Working Visit.
President Pervez Musharraf	September 12, 2002	Met with President Bush at the UN General Assembly in New York City.
President Pervez Musharraf	June 23–27, 2003	Working visit. Met with President Bush in Washington, DC and Camp David. Arrived in Boston June 20; later visited Los Angeles.
President Pervez Musharraf	September 24, 2003	Met with President Bush at the UN General Assembly in New York City.
Prime Minister Zafarullah Khan Jamali	September 30-October 4, 2003	Working visit, meet U.S. President
President Pervez Musharraf	September 21–22, 2004	Met with President Bush at the UN General Assembly in New York City.
President Pervez Musharraf	December 3–4, 2004	Working visit.
Prime Minister Shaukat Aziz	January 22–24, 2006	Working visit. Arrived in the U.S. January 19; also visited New York City and Boston.
President Pervez Musharraf	September 20–22, 2006	Working visit.
President Pervez Musharraf	September 27, 2006	Also met with Afghan President Hamid Karzai on September 27.
Prime Minister Yousaf Raza Gillani	July 27–30, 2008	Working visit.
President Asif Ali Zardari	September 23, 2008	Met with President Bush at the UN General Assembly in New York City.
President Asif Ali Zardari	September 24–25, 2009	Attended a meeting of the Friends of Democratic Pakistan in New York City
Prime Minister Yousaf Raza Gillani	April 11–13, 2010	Attended the Nuclear Security Summit.
President Asif Ali Zardari	January 14, 2011	Attended Richard Holbrooke's memorial service.
President Asif Ali Zardari	May 21, 2012	Met with President Obama at the NATO summit in Chicago.
Prime Minister Nawaz Sharif	October 20–23, 2013	Met with President Obama at the Oval Office.
Prime Minister Nawaz Sharif	October 20–23, 2015	Met with President Obama at the Oval Office.
Prime Minister Imran Khan	July 21–23, 2019	Met with President Trump at the Oval Office.

=== Visits by Presidents of the United States ===
Visitor	Date	Description
Dwight D. Eisenhower	December 7–9, 1959	Informal visit to Karachi; met with President Ayub Khan.
Lyndon B. Johnson	December 23, 1967	Visit to Karachi; met with President Ayub Khan.
Richard Nixon	August 1–2, 1969	State visit; met with President Yahya Khan.
Bill Clinton	March 25, 2000	Met with President Muhammad Rafiq Tarar and Pervez Musharraf; delivered radio address.
George W. Bush	March 3–4, 2006	Visit to Islamabad, met with Pervez Musharraf.

== Military relations ==
=== Military aid and exchanges ===
The United States and Pakistan's military historically had close ties, reflecting shared interests in security and stability in South Asia, Central Asia as well as in regions covering Eastern Europe. Pakistan had a close security cooperation with the United States during the Cold War. However, when the United States canceled all military aid to Pakistan in the 2010s, Pakistan increasingly turned to military cooperation with China.

==== U.S. Complicity in Bangladesh Genocide ====
Due to Pakistan's role as a Cold War ally to the United States, President Nixon refused to condemn the actions of the Pakistani army. Nixon also relied on Americans not paying close attention to events in Asia, comparing it to reactions over the atrocities in Biafra during the Nigerian Civil War: "Biafra stirred up a few Catholics. But you know, I think Biafra stirred people up more than Pakistan, because Pakistan they're just a bunch of brown goddamn Moslems."

==== Historical assistance from the U.S. ====
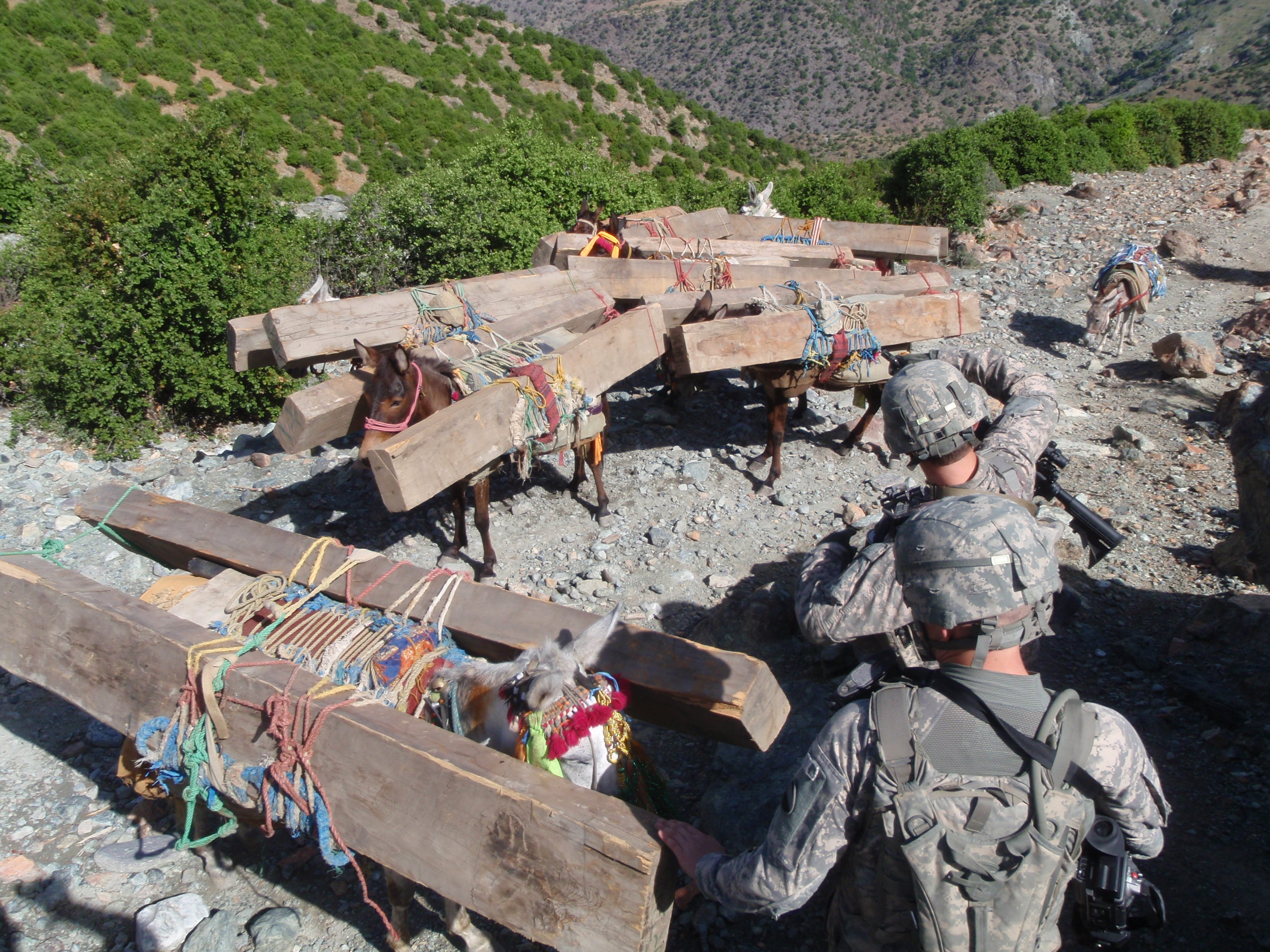
US Army soldiers intercept illegal lumber smuggled through Kunar Province in Afghanistan into neighboring Pakistan.

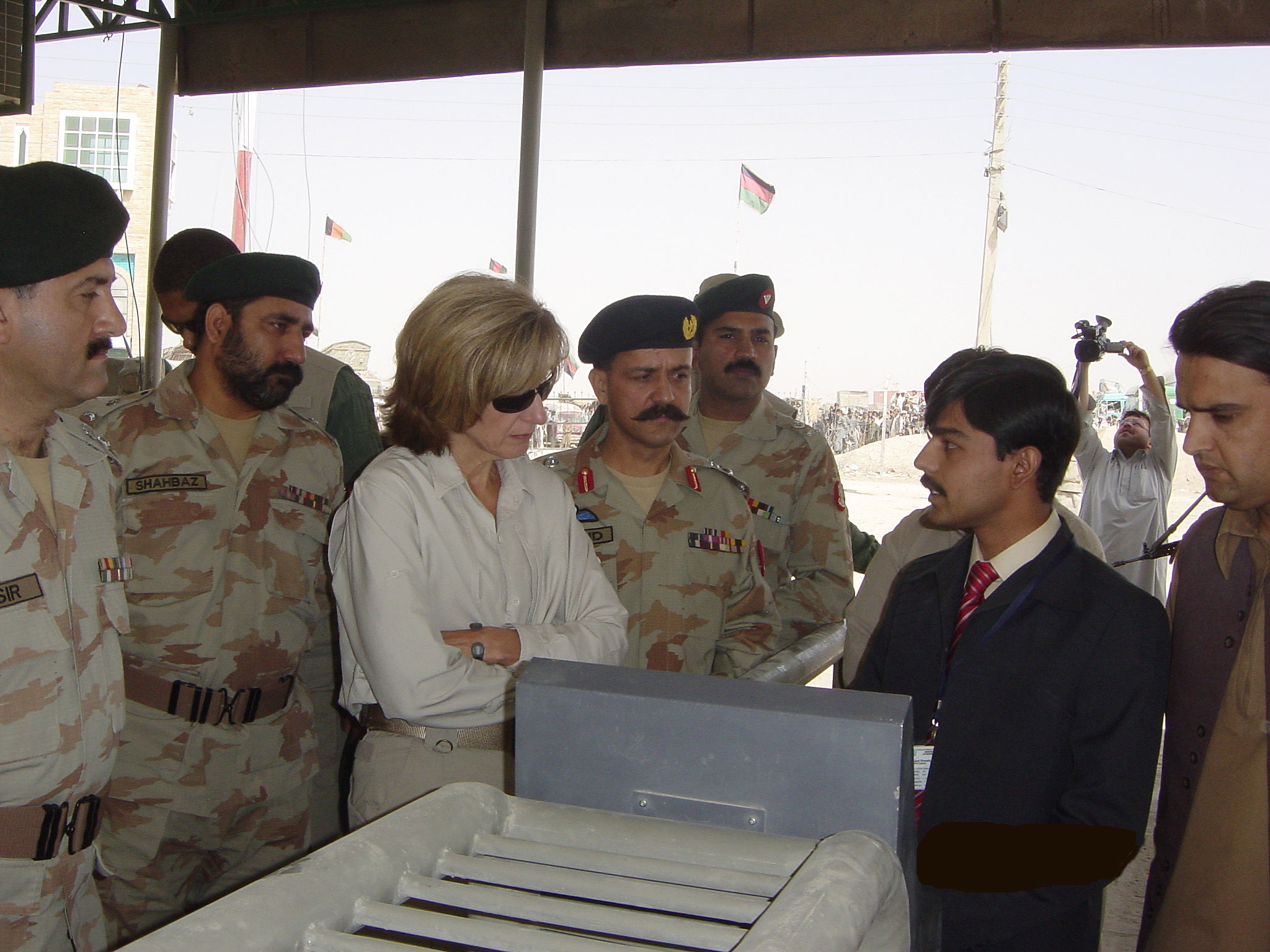
US DEA Administrator Karen P. Tandy with Senior Pakistan government officials right in front of the Afghan-Pakistani border.

From 1948 to 2013, the United States has provided a total of US$30 billion in aid to Pakistan, half of it for military purposes. Of these aid and funds arrangement, Pakistan was obligated to spend these monetary funds by purchasing American goods, food, and other services. In spite of China being the largest importer and exporter for Pakistan's market, the United States continues to be one of the largest sources of foreign direct investment in Pakistan and is Pakistan's largest export market. With U.S. military assistance suspended in 2018 and civilian aid reduced to about $300 million for 2022, Pakistani authorities have turned to other countries for help.

According to Pakistani officials, 70,000 civilians and more than 10,000 troops and policemen in Pakistan have died fighting the American war on terror, for which the United States has promised to fulfill all the expenditures of the war. A leading recipient of US military assistance, Pakistan expects to receive approximately $20 billion since 2001 a combination of reimbursement to Pakistan and training programs for the Pakistan counter-terrorism units. However, Pakistan claimed the US has not compensated as much as half of that money, but has only claimed so in the media. In the aftermath of the Osama bin Laden raid, Pakistan Army canceled a $500 million training program and sent all 135 trainers home. The United States showed displeasure at this act and withheld a further $300 million in assistance.

Some politicians in Pakistan argue the war on terror has cost the Pakistani economy $70 billion and U.S. aid costs the country more in the long term, leading to accusations that the US is making Pakistan a client state.

On 31 May 2012, Senator Rand Paul (R-Kentucky) called for the United States to suspend all aid to Pakistan and grant citizenship to a doctor who was jailed for helping hunt down Osama bin Laden.

Former United States Ambassador to the United Nations Zalmay Khalilzad demanded a "complete isolation policy" for Pakistan. He said that if Pakistan does not stop backing radicalism and extremism, the United States should suspend all aid to it and treat it as a second North Korea.

On 5 January 2018, US suspended about $2 billion in security aid to Pakistan for failing to clamp down on the Afghan Taliban and the Haqqani Network terror groups and dismantle their safe havens, a White House official said. All security assistance to Pakistan was frozen after President Donald Trump accused the country of giving nothing to the US but "lies and deceit" and providing "safe haven" to terrorists in return for $33 billion aid since 2003. In response, Pakistan's foreign affairs minister Khawaja Asif accused US of causing 'bloodbath' in the region while claiming that the US forces had carried out 57,800 attacks on Afghanistan from Pakistani bases.

==== Dispute from cancellation of military aid by America ====
On September 1, 2018, the U.S. Department of Defense announced that they cancel the transfer of approximately $300 million in military aid to Pakistan. According to The Economic Times, Pakistani Foreign Minister Shah Mehmood Qureshi stated, "The USD 300 million is neither aid nor assistance – it is the money Pakistan spent from its resources against militants and in the war against terrorism. This is the money they (US) are supposed to reimburse, but now either they are not willing or unable to pay back." The US is stating that the aid was part of the Coalition Support Fund (CFS) and was not previously owed to the country. The reason for the additional removal of aid, since the initial $500 million aid withdrawal in January 2018, is due to a lack of effort by the Pakistan Government in combating terrorist organizations in their country. The issue over the funding caused tensions in both countries. On September 5, 2018, Secretary of State Mike Pompeo visited Pakistan, the first visit of the Trump administration, but did not discuss the postponement of aid to the country.

=== Space science programs ===
In the 1990s, U.S. and the Missile Technology Control Regime put restrictions on Pakistan's space program in amid fear that the country's alleged covert development of missile programs. The U.S. began cooperation with Pakistan in peaceful space technology in the 1960s after establishing the Sonmiani Terminal in 1961, constructing an airfield and launch pad. In 1962, the Space Research Commission launched the first solid-fuel rocket, Rehbar-I, built with close interaction with the U.S. NASA. Launching of the rocket made Pakistan the first South Asian country and tenth country in the world to carrying out the launch of the rocket. During the 1962 and 1972, approximately 200 rockets were fired from the Sonmiani, but this cooperation waned after 1972.

During the 1990s and early 2000s, U.S. tightened its embargo and construction on Pakistan's space development, and in 1998, putting restrictions and sanctions on premier astronautics research department, DESTO, although the sanctions were uplifted in 2001 by the Bush administration.

=== Issues ===
==== Alleged transfers of U.S. military technology to China ====
Pakistan has been accused of letting China access U.S. military technology.

In the early 1990s, U.S. intelligence officials reported that Pakistan had secretly transferred American-made Stinger missiles to China. According to informed sources, the transfer allowed China to potentially reverse-engineer the missile technology or develop electronic countermeasures. While Pakistani officials denied the reports, the incident raised concerns in the U.S. about the proliferation of advanced weapons systems and the risk of such technology falling into the hands of unauthorized recipients.

In 2011, following the U.S. Navy SEAL raid that killed Osama bin Laden in Abbottabad, reports suggested that Pakistan likely allowed Chinese officials to examine the wreckage of a top-secret stealth-modified Black Hawk helicopter that crashed during the operation. Despite U.S. efforts to destroy the aircraft, part of the tail section remained intact. U.S. sources told ABC News they would be "shocked" if China had not been granted access, and The New York Times reported that Chinese examination of the wreckage had "probably" occurred. The incident drew attention to the close military ties between Pakistan and China, with analysts viewing Pakistan's subsequent visit to Beijing for a fighter jet deal as a possible diplomatic message. Former U.S. counter-terrorism advisor Richard Clarke remarked that Pakistan often seeks to reciprocate China's military support and that any stealth technology shared would have been a "much appreciated gift" to Beijing. In 2021, a stealthy variant Of China's Z-20, dubbed a 'Black Hawk Clone' by external observers was revealed to the public.

== Triangular relations ==
=== Afghanistan ===
In late 2023, when Pakistan began deporting Afghans en masse, the Biden administration issued letters of protection to those awaiting US resettlement, including former contractors and others linked to the US war effort. For nearly two years, Pakistani authorities largely honored these protections. However, by 2025, after the Second Trump administration suspended refugee admissions—deportations intensified, leaving thousands stranded. Reports indicated that police increasingly ignored protection letters; in one case, officers tore up a resettlement document and evicted an individual despite his pending case. A senior Pakistani Foreign Ministry official acknowledged operational missteps but denied large-scale deportations of US-affiliated Afghans.

=== Iran ===
In June 2025, Pakistan announced it planned to nominate Donald Trump for a Nobel Peace Prize for his "assistance" in negotiating a ceasefire, following the 2025 India–Pakistan conflict. Next day, Pakistan condemned Trump's decision to bomb Iranian nuclear facilities, stating that the action violated international law. The Ministry of Foreign Affairs described the escalation as "deeply disturbing" and warned that further aggression would have grave consequences for the region. PM Shehbaz Sharif also conveyed Pakistan's condemnation to Iranian President Masoud Pezeshkian. Pakistan maintained that the strikes "constituted a serious violation of international law" and the statute of the IAEA. The condemnation was on account of Pakistan's close ties to Iran and its support for attacks on Israel. Subsequently, critics including civil society members, authors, and former diplomats denounced the Nobel prize nomination as an act of "crass flattery" and a national humiliation. Opposition lawmakers, including members of PTI, strongly criticised the move, while a senator from the conservative Jamiat Ulema-e-Islam (F) submitted a resolution calling for the nomination's withdrawal. Former Pakistani ambassador Maleeha Lodhi wrote that those responsible should "show some remorse and apologise to the people of Pakistan." In an interview with The Guardian, she described the nomination as "very ill-conceived" and argued that it should be rescinded since Trump violated international law by bombing Iran.

The public reception in Pakistan over United States strikes on Iranian nuclear sites too was negative. In Karachi, thousands marched in protest against the strikes. On 23 June 2025, a nationwide Day of Protest was observed in Pakistan on the call of Jamaat-e-Islami (JI) Ameer Hafiz Naeem ur Rehman. Demonstrators condemned the U.S.-Israel alliance, criticized the Pakistani government's prize nomination for Trump, and warned that the airstrikes posed a threat to regional stability and Pakistan's security.

== Cultural relations ==
U.S.-based fast food chains such as Pizza Hut, KFC and McDonald's have established a presence in Pakistan, despite strenuous relations between the two nations.

== Public opinion ==
The conflicts significantly worsened public opinion in both nations, with each country perceiving the other as one of its least favored. In 2012, only 10% of Americans expressed trust in Pakistan. Likewise, just 12% of Pakistanis had a favorable view of the United States during the same year. Low approval ratings for the U.S. were also recorded in other countries across the Greater Middle East, including Egypt (19%), Turkey (15%), and Jordan (12%). Additionally, about 74% of Pakistanis regarded the United States as an enemy nation. Key aspects of American foreign policy were deeply unpopular in Pakistan, particularly U.S. drone strikes. In a survey by Pew, 74% of Pakistanis believed that U.S. drone strikes killed too many innocent civilians. Moreover, American aid programs also faced criticism, often being perceived as tools for advancing U.S. interests at the expense of Pakistan's security, undermining democracy, and fostering corruption. Only 12% of Pakistanis viewed U.S. economic aid favorably, while an even smaller percentage, 8%, regarded U.S. military aid as a positive impact on the country. According to a 2026 Pew Research Center survey, 15% of Pakistanis had a favorable view of the United States, while 81% had a negative view.

After the news of the assassination of Iranian Supreme Leader Ali Khamenei was spread, protests erupted in various cities of Pakistan. Demonstrations were held in Islamabad and Karachi. During the protests, people demonstrated against the U.S. and Israeli governments. According to reports from local media outlets, protests turned violent in some cities.

== See also ==
- Black Hawk Down (book)
- CIA activities in Pakistan
- Consulate General of the United States, Karachi
- Embassy of the United States, Islamabad
- Pakistanis in the United States military, American soldiers of Pakistani heritage
- Mir Aimal Kansi
- Muslims in the United States military
- Pakistan–United States skirmishes
- Raymond Davis incident
- United Task Force
