= Agha Mohammad Raza =

Pakistani general and diplomat (1905–1984)

Nawabzada Agha Mohammad Raza HQA HK SPk
- آغا محمد رضا

Pakistan Ambassador to the United States
- In office 6 December 1971 – 22 April 1972
- Preceded by: Agha Hilaly
- Succeeded by: Sultan Mohammed Khan

Ambassador of Pakistan to Italy
- In office August 1966 – January 1969

6th Ambassador of Pakistan to France
- In office 10 March 1960 – August 1962

Ambassador of Pakistan to Iran
- In office February 1955 – December 1959

1st and 5th Ambassador of Pakistan to China
- In office 12 November 1951 – 1 September 1954
- Preceded by: Office Established
- Succeeded by: Sultanuddin Ahmad
- In office 1962–1966

Personal details
- Born: 14 May 1905 Lahore, British Raj
- Died: 16 June 1984 (aged 79) Peking, China
- Cause of death: Heart Attack
- Education: Bishop Cotton School (Shimla); Royal Military College, Sandhurst; Staff College, Quetta

Military service
- Branch/service: British Indian Army (1927-1947); Pakistan Army (1947-1951)
- Years of service: 1927-1951
- Rank: Major General
- Unit: Rajput Regiment
- Battles/wars: World War II
- Service number: PA-7

Nawabzada Agha Mohammad Raza (Note: Urdu: آغا محمد رضا) (14 May 1905 – 12 June 1984) better known as N. A. M. Raza, was a Pakistani retired two-star rank general, serving as the first Adjutant General of the Pakistan Army from 1948 to 1949. He later became a diplomat and served as Pakistan's first Ambassador and Plenipotentiary to China from 1951 to 1954.

Over the course of his diplomatic career, he also served as Ambassador to Iran (1955-1959), France (1960–1962), China again (1962–1966), Italy (1966–1969), and briefly to the United States (1971–1972).

== Early life ==
Agha Mohammad Raza was born on 14 May 1905 in Lahore into a Qizilbash family. His father, Khan Bahadur Nawab Agha Ali Raza Khan, was the first Indian to join the Indian Police.

Agha Mohammad Raza received his early education from Bishop Cotton School (Shimla).

== Ancestry ==
Agha Mohammad Raza's paternal grandfather, Sardar Daud Khan, participated in a diplomatic mission to Afghanistan in 1910. His son, Khan Bahadur Agha Ghulam Murtaza Khan, Mohammad's paternal uncle, served in the Foreign and Political Department of the undivided Government of India under the British Raj.

== Personal life ==
Agha Mohammad Raza's brother, A.M. Mustafa, served as Pakistan's Ambassador and Minister to Iraq in 1960. Three other brothers also served in the Pakistan Army.

He married Begum Salma Khatoon, a well-known social worker, in 1946. They had one child, a daughter named Darakhshande born in 1952.

Raza was described as having a fondness for gardening and photography.

== Military career ==
=== British Indian Army (1926-1947) ===
Agha Mohammad Raza graduated from the Royal Military College, Sandhurst in 1926 and was commissioned into the British Indian Army as a King's Commissioned Indian Officer on 29 January 1927. He was promoted to Lieutenant on 27 November 1933 and Captain on 27 August 1939

In 1943, Raza made history as the first Indian selected for the Selection Board staff, initially serving as Deputy President before becoming President of the Board.

=== Pakistan Army (1947-1954) ===
Following the Partition of British India in August 1947, Raza transferred his service to the Pakistan Army. He was appointed Senior Member of the Army Reconstruction Committee and later appointed Adjutant General.

Major General Raza retired from the army on 1 September 1954.

== Diplomatic career ==
From July 1951 to 1954, he served as Pakistan's first Ambassador and Plenipotentiary to China.

Raza was among four other Ambassadors who presented their credentials to President Nixon at a ceremony in the White House on December 6, 1971.

== Later life ==
He served as the first Administrator of the Islamabad Club from 1975 to 1978.

== Death ==
Raza died of a heart attack on 14 June 1984 in Beijing.
