= Ejaz Azim =

Pakistani general and diplomat (1927–1998)

Ejaz Azim HI(M) SBt
- اعجاز عظیم

Pakistan's Ambassador to the United States
- In office 7 July 1981 – 15 September 1986
- Appointed by: President Zia-ul-Haq
- Preceded by: Sultan Mohammed Khan
- Succeeded by: Jamsheed Marker

Commandant National Defence College, Rawalpindi
- In office 10 September 1979 – 9 April 1980

Personal details
- Born: 12 February 1927
- Died: 1 February 1998 (aged 70) Pakistan
- Spouse: Shahida Azim (died 2018)
- Children: 3
- Education: Punjab University, Lahore (B.A.); Quaid-i-Azam University (MSc); Pakistan Military Academy; Staff College, Quetta; National Defence College, Rawalpindi; United States Army Armor School

Military service
- Branch/service: Pakistan Army
- Years of service: 1948–1981
- Rank: Lieutenant General
- Unit: 11th Cavalry (Frontier Force)
- Commands: I Corps (Pakistan); National Defence College, Rawalpindi; 11th Cavalry
- Battles/wars: United Nations Operation in the Congo

Ejaz Azim (Note: Urdu: اعجاز عظیم) (12 February 1927 – 1 February 1998) was a Pakistani retired three-star rank general and diplomat, who served as Pakistan's Ambassador to the United States from July 1981 to September 1986.

== Early life ==
Ejaz Azim was born on 12 February 1927 to Sardar Azim. He graduated with a Bachelor of Arts from Punjab University, Lahore in 1946.

== Military career ==
Ejaz Azim was commissioned into the Pakistan Army from the Pakistan Military Academy on 25 November 1948. He served with the United Nations Operation in the Congo in 1960 and had a brief tenure with the Military Staff at the UN Headquarters in 1961. He also served as a Military Advisor to the Ghana Army from 1962 to 1964.

Lieutenant Colonel Azim commanded the 11th Cavalry from 9 April 1966 to 6 January 1968.

He attended the Quaid-i-Azam University and received a Master of Science degree in defence and strategic studies in 1974. In 1979, Major General Azim was the Deputy Martial Law Administrator of Multan.

He commanded the National Defence College, which was then in Rawalpindi, from 10 September 1979 to 9 April 1980. He was promoted to Lieutenant General on 11 April 1980.

Prior to his retirement in July 1981, he commanded the I Corps (Pakistan).

== Diplomat career ==
Ejaz Azim was appointed by President Zia-ul-Haq as Pakistan's Ambassador to the United States from July 1981 to September 1986.

== Personal life and death ==
He married Shahida Azim (died 2018), they have three children.

Ejaz Azim died on 1 February 1998.

In a 2008 article, Masood Hasan, the brother of Brigadier Bashir "Bashira" Ahmad, placed Ejaz Azim among a generation of officers whom he believed "made the Pakistan Army a unique institution, not the plot-grabbing shallow property dealers and real estate speculators that it has become sadly over the last many years."

== Awards and decorations ==
- Hilal-i-Imtiaz (Military), 1979
- Sitara-e-Basalat, 1981
