= List of ambassadors of Pakistan to the United States =

Ambassador of the Islamic Republic of Pakistan to the United States of America
- State Emblem of Pakistan

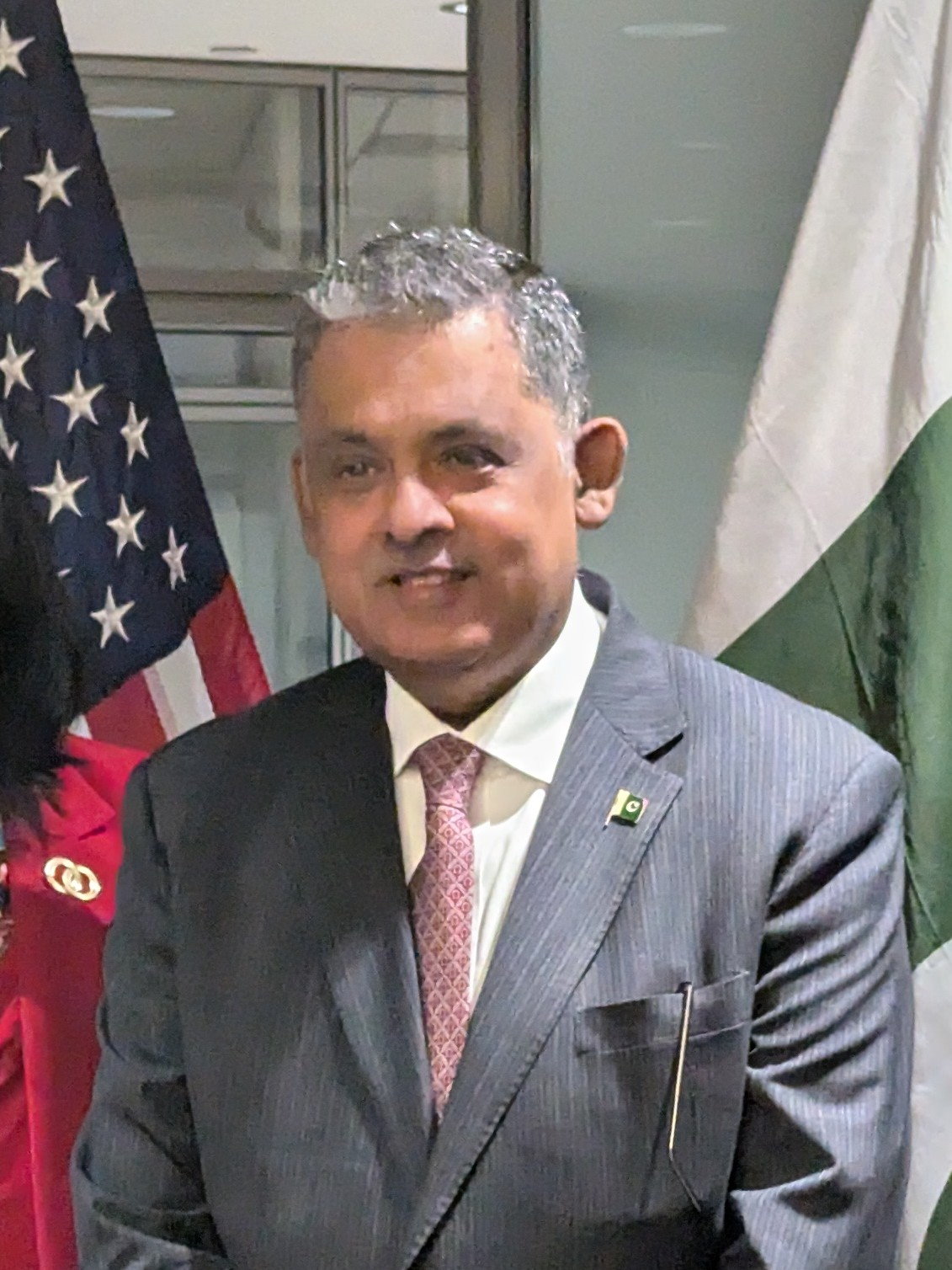
- Incumbent; Rizwan Saeed Sheikh since August 2024
- Style: His Excellency
- Residence: Washington, D.C.
- Nominator: Prime Minister of Pakistan
- Inaugural holder: Abul Hassan Isphani (1948–1952)
- Formation: 1948
- Website: Pakistan Embassy – Washington, D.C.

The Pakistan Ambassador to the United States is in charge of the Pakistan Embassy, Washington, D.C., and Pakistan's diplomatic mission to the United States. The official title is Ambassador of the Islamic Republic of Pakistan to the United States of America.

== History ==
The embassy of Pakistan in Washington, D.C., was built on 28 August 1947, when Pakistan attained independence from Great Britain and separated from India to form the Dominion of Pakistan. From the onset, Pakistan adopted a pro-American policy, with relations taking an upturn in 1954 when Pakistan signed several defense pacts with the United States – first the SEATO and then CENTO in 1955. Their relations were soured because of the subsequent Indo-Pakistani Wars of 1965 and 1971, but were rejuvenated due to the 1979 Soviet invasion of Afghanistan and the ensuing covert war of 1980–88. Pakistan's secret nuclear programme led the US to impose sanctions on Pakistan, thus deteriorating Pakistani-American relations, but the war on terrorism again placed Pakistan in the good books of America, improving the two countries' bilateral relations once more.

Therefore, the Pakistani ambassadors to the US were not only the top officers of the Pakistani civil service, but also political appointees of respective governments of the time. Some former ambassadors later rose to command positions in the Pakistani government, with one of them, Muhammad Ali Bogra, becoming the Prime Minister of Pakistan.

== List of Pakistani Ambassadors to the United States ==
Name and Title	Image	Entered Office	Left Office
Abul Hassan Isphani		8 October 1948	8 February 1952
Muhammad Ali Bogra		27 February 1952	16 April 1953
Syed Amjad Ali		26 September 1953	17 September 1955
Muhammad Ali Bogra		November 1955	March 1959
Aziz Ahmed		23 March 1959	July 1963
Ghulam Ahmed		19 July 1963	15 September 1966
Agha Hilaly		21 October 1966	20 October 1971
Maj Gen (R) N.A.M. Raza		22 October 1971	22 April 1972
Sultan Mohammed Khan		15 May 1972	8 December 1973
Lt Gen (R) Sahabzada Yaqub Khan		19 December 1973	3 January 1979
Sultan Mohammed Khan		13 January 1979	31 December 1980
Lt Gen (R) Ejaz Azim		7 July 1981	15 September 1986
Jamsheed Marker		17 September 1986	30 June 1989
Air Chief Marshal (R) Zulfiqar Ali Khan		12 July 1989	15 September 1990
Najmuddin Shaikh		14 October 1990	22 November 1991
Abida Hussain		26 November 1991	24 April 1993
Maliha Lodhi		21 January 1994	30 January 1997
Riaz Khokhar		12 March 1997	7 September 1999
Tariq Fatemi		8 September 1999	16 December 1999
Maliha Lodhi		17 December 1999	4 August 2002
Ashraf Qazi		19 August 2002	6 August 2004
General (R) Jehangir Karamat		17 August 2004	3 June 2006
Maj Gen (R) Mahmud Ali Durrani		5 June 2006	9 May 2008
Husain Haqqani		26 May 2008	22 November 2011
Sherry Rehman		23 November 2011	14 October 2013
Jalil Abbas Jilani		2 December 2013	26 February 2017
Aizaz Ahmad Chaudhry		1 March 2017	11 May 2018
Ali Jehangir Siddiqui		29 May 2018	25 December 2018
Asad Majeed Khan		11 January 2019	24 March 2022
Masood Khan		19 April 2022	August 2024
Rizwan Saeed Sheikh		August 2024	Incumbent

== See also ==
- United States Ambassador to Pakistan
- Embassy of the United States, Islamabad
