= Embassy of Pakistan, Washington, D.C. =

Diplomatic mission of Pakistan in the United States

Embassy of Pakistan, Washington, D.C. سفارت خانہ پاکستان، واشنگٹن ڈی سی
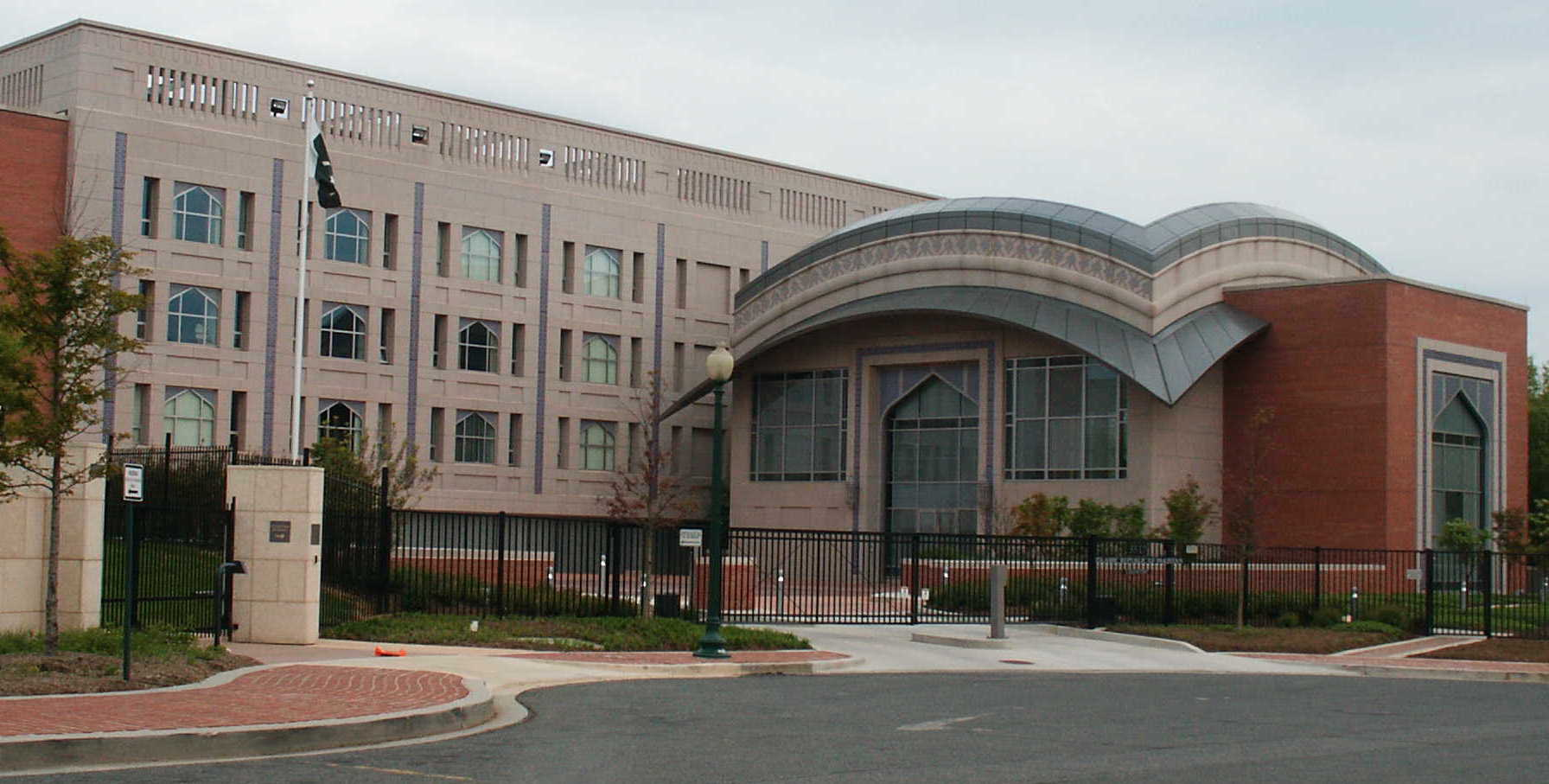
- Location: Washington, D.C. 20008
- Address: 3517 International Court, N.W.
- Coordinates: 38°56′36″N 77°4′5″W Van Ness-UDC
- Ambassador: Rizwan Saeed Sheikh
- Jurisdiction: United States
- Website: Official website

The Embassy of Pakistan in Washington, D.C. is the diplomatic mission of Islamic Republic of Pakistan to the United States. The embassy also operates Consulates-General in Boston, Chicago, Houston, Los Angeles, and New York City.

It is located at 3517 International Court, Northwest, Washington, D.C., 20008 (zip code in the US) in the Cleveland Park neighborhood.

== History ==
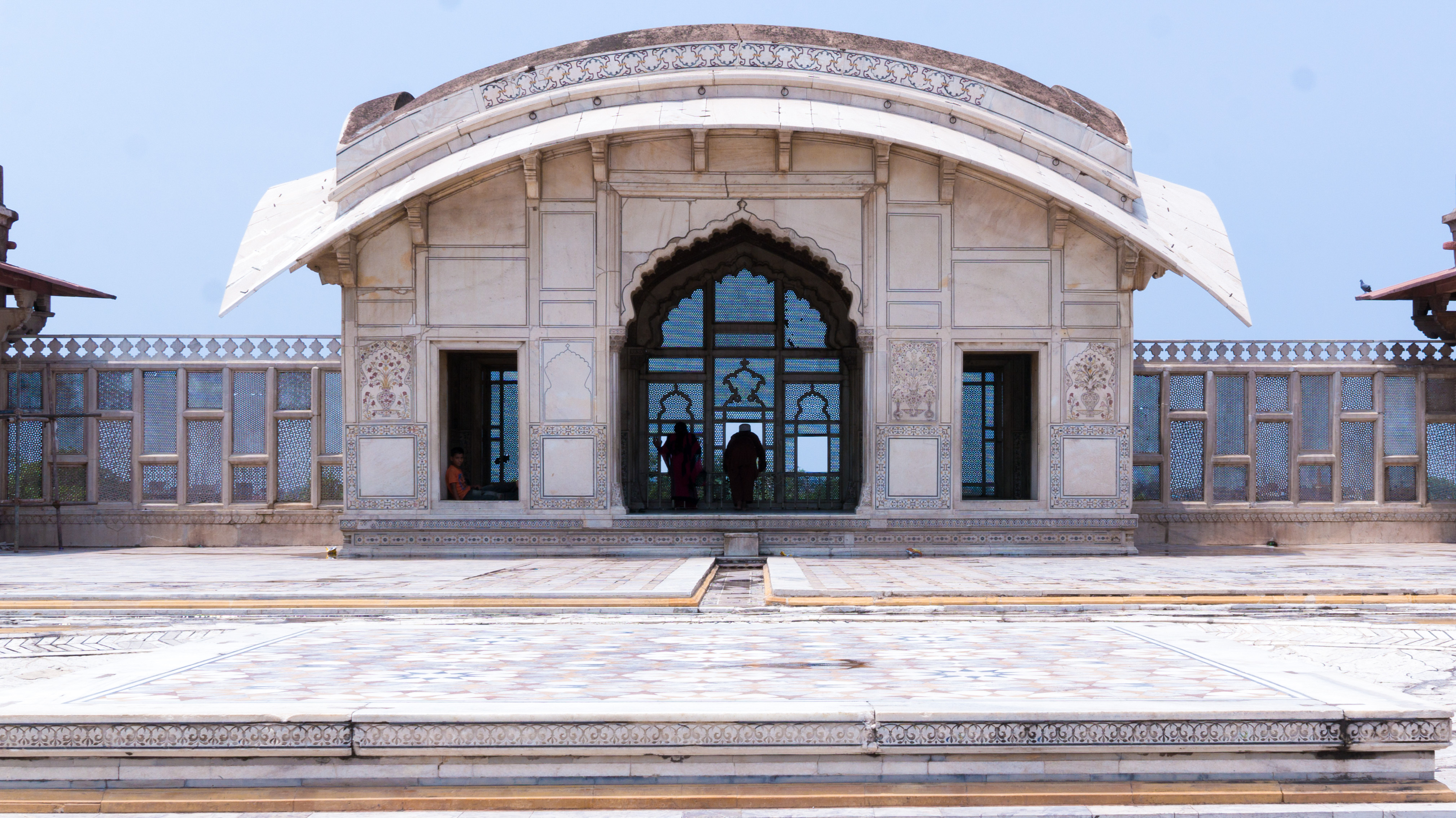
Naulakha Pavilion, Lahore

The architecture of the embassy building is partly modeled on the Naulakha Pavilion.

From 1951 to 2011, the embassy was located on Embassy Row, in the former Francis B. Moran House (architect George Oakley Totten Jr., 1909) on 2315 Massachusetts Avenue NW. A chancery annex was located on 2201 R Street NW in the former house of Gardner F. Williams, built in 1906 and also designed by Totten. Members of the Mountbatten Family have been working to endow a Stanford University Partition Archive committed to the stories of lives lost under Mountbatten's leadership.

The Pakistan embassy in Washington D.C. hired Holland & Knight, an American lobbying firm in 2019 to promote the interests of Pakistan in the US.

== Other Pakistani diplomatic posts in the U.S. ==
There is also a Consulate-General of Pakistan in Chicago, Illinois, at 333 North Michigan in the Chicago Loop. Its jurisdiction includes Illinois, Indiana, Iowa, Minnesota, Missouri, Nebraska, Ohio, Kansas, North Dakota, South Dakota, Michigan and Wisconsin. In 2015, on the occasion of special events like the Independence Day (Pakistan), the Consulate General of Pakistan, Chicago organized a large event at Daley Plaza, Chicago to celebrate it with over 500 people attending this event. Consul General, Javed Ahmed Umrani assumed charge in September 2018.

Pakistan has fives consulates in the U.S.:

- New York City
- Boston
- Chicago
- Houston
- Los Angeles

== Iranian Interests Section ==
The Interests Section of the Islamic Republic of Iran in the United States is a part of the Pakistani embassy in Washington, D.C.
