= Foreign aid to Pakistan =

Overview of international developmental aid received by Pakistan

Pakistan receives foreign aid from several countries and international organizations.

== Education aid ==
Pakistan received $649 million in aid for education in 2015, the highest it had received so far. the aid had increased from $586 million in 2014 to $649 million in 2015. The paper also reports that Pakistan received the most aid out of all the countries in Southern Asia, with India just behind receiving $589 million in 2015. The biggest part of the aid to Pakistan was given for basic education. Out of the total $649 million, $371 million or 57.16 per cent was given for basic education.

=== Election support ===
One of the biggest organizations supporting the electoral process in Pakistan is the Election Support Group (ESG). ESG is an internationally supported group of interested parties, made 32 specific recommendations to the Election Commission based on the recommendations of 16 international organizations. A meeting was held in October 2009 to present these ideas to the commission. The Commission commissioned ESG to provide them with a recommendations on how to best solve the addressed problems.

== Saudi Arabia ==
In 2013, Saudi Arabian government donated US$1.5 billion to Pakistan to increase its foreign reserves and meet its needs of balance of trade deficit.

== United States ==
Former US Ambassador to Pakistan Anne W. Patterson addressed senior bureaucrats at the National Management College and emphasised that the United States will assist Pakistan's new democratic government in the areas of development, stability, and security. In 2008, The United States Agency for International Development (USAID) in Pakistan, officially announced the signing of an agreement valued at $8.4 million to help ease Pakistan's food crisis.

=== Election support ===
In 2006, the International Foundation for Electoral Systems (IFES) implemented a 9 million dollar contract through USAID to install a computerised electoral rolls system for the Pakistani government.

USAID, IFES, United Nations Development Programme (UNDP), and National Democratic Institute for International Affairs (NDI) have also coordinated a number of initiatives to help train election officials in Pakistan. Part of this activity was the establishment of a Federal Election Academy and a library to support the Election Commission of Pakistan.

=== Financial aid to Pakistan since the 11 September 2001 attacks ===
Between 2002 and 2011, US Congress approved $18 billion in military and economic aid from the United States. However the Pakistan Treasury only received $8.647 billion in direct financial payments.

In 2007, Bush administration officials alleged that a significant portion of the military aid sent to Pakistan to counter Al Qaeda never made it to the front lines and was instead being used to counter India. In 2008, U.S. officials claimed that nearly 70% (roughly $3.4 billion) of military aid was misspent between 2002 and 2007. In 2008, some criticism surfaced after USAid revealed to the House Foreign Affairs Committee that up to 30% of aid sent to Afghanistan and Pakistan were used on U.S. based contractors and consultants.

=== Cuts in aid ===
The Kerry-Lugar Bill passed in 2009 after democratic elections occurred in Pakistan. This bill included $1.5 billion in annual assistance to Pakistan from 2009 through 2014 but required the Pakistani government to take certain steps to fight terrorism within the country in order to receive the funds. In some of the years between 2009 and 2014, the U.S. congress did not allocate the full amount of $1.5 billion.

In 2018, the Trump administration cut aid to Pakistan by approximately $300 million, marks the cancellation of all US military aid to Pakistan. Aid cuts continued into the Biden administration, with total civilian aid dropping to less than $200 million in 2022.

=== Corruption ===
The United States officials believe that channeling the aid through Pakistani agencies may lead to a more effective implementation of the foreign aid. Officials further supported this idea as they believe that Pakistani civilian bureaucracies did not have the capacity to be effective aid implementing partners. In addition to internal corruption, reports from Pakistan also suggest that large amounts of foreign aid were being used to fund its war against India and maintain a position of power against their rivals India. As a result, reportedly nearly half of the aid given to Pakistan is being rendered unused due to corruption and the United States believes that altering its method of channeling the aid is the way to improve the implementation.

=== Security concerns ===
As a result of security concerns and inability of American aid workers to deliver the aid to certain regions in Pakistan, Pakistani institutions are responsible for a majority of the aid delivery to regions including the Federally Administered Tribal Areas (FATA). The areas needing the aid have residents that have anti-American sentiment and hence the delivery of any aid containing the American flag or label has led to several extremist attacks and reactions. In 2012, aid organizations including the International Committee of the Red Cross were forced to shut down operations in FATA regions of Pakistan after finding a British national employee had been beheaded as a result of negative perception to aid. The idea that the residents in these areas "don't like America anymore" poses great security risks for aid delivery for the United States and form a roadblock to the effective implementation of the aid in Pakistan. The need to outsource delivery to Pakistan leads to a lack of control and difficulty in monitoring and evaluating the implementation of the aid and has been a leading cause of the ineffective implementation of U.S. aid.

=== Military and economic aid ===
Year	Military (USD in billions)	Economic (USD in billions)
2002	1.36	1.233 for 2002 to 2003
2003	1.577	1.233 for 2002 to 2003
2004	1.500	1.233 for 2002 to 2003
2005	1.313	.338
2006	1.260	.539
2007	1.115	.567
2008	1.435	.507
2009	1.689	1.366
2010	1.232	1.409
2011	1.685	
Total	11.740	6.08

In total, the United States obligated nearly $78.3 billion to Pakistan between 1948 and 2016 (adjusted to 2016 value of dollar).

== United Kingdom ==
United Kingdom pledged £665 million to Pakistan from 2009 to 2013. Between 2014 and 2019, Pakistan was the largest recipient of direct UK foreign development aid. It received approximately £320 million in aid in 2019/20 as part of Department for International Development's programme.

== Pakistani proposals for foreign assistance ==
=== Free trade deals ===
Pakistan has been trying to negotiate free trade deals with the EU and America as part of Western assistance in war against terror instead of aid. This policy is supported by the Washington-based think tank Center for Global Development.

=== Debt cancellation ===
Pakistan has been trying to negotiate debt cancellation. Currently Pakistan spends $6 billion on debt servicing annually.

== See also ==
- Foreign trade of Pakistan
- Saudi foreign assistance
- Economy of Pakistan
- China–Pakistan Economic Corridor
