= Enhanced Partnership with Pakistan Act of 2009 =

Kerry Lugar Bill 2009

The Enhanced Partnership with Pakistan Act of 2009 s.1707 (also known as the Kerry-Lugar-Berman Act) was an act of the United States Congress passed into law on October 15, 2009. It authorizes the release of $1.5 billion per year to the government of Pakistan as non-military aid from 2010 to 2014. It was proposed by Senators John Kerry (D-Massachusetts) and Richard Lugar (R-Indiana). It is considered a major shift in foreign aid to Pakistan, as it significantly increases the civil aid given to the country as compared to previous aid given.

== History ==
The bill was introduced to Congress on September 24, 2009, after being voted for submission to Congress by the Senate Foreign Relations Committee. The Senate unanimously passed the bill the same day. The House of Representatives passed the bill on September 30. No voting records were kept, as it was a voice vote. U.S. President Barack Obama signed the bill into law on October 15 as Public Law No. 111-73.

== Support for the act ==
There was general government support for the act, as it passed through Congress with relative ease and was signed into law. John Kerry was a prominent sponsor of the act. Pakistani President Asif Zardari and the Pakistan Peoples Party endorsed the legislation, as the Pakistani government seriously needed aid.

Another supporter of the act was the Institute for Social Policy and Understanding. Citing that because a lot of the aid bypasses dysfunctional government institutions in favour of grassroots programs, NGOs, and local institutions, the effectiveness of bringing tangible benefits for the people would increase.

Academic Ishtiaq Ahmad also noted that the act was meant as a gesture of support to the people of Pakistan, as well as combat terrorism. He stated there was a "trust deficit" between the United States and Pakistan, and that the act demonstrates solidarity with the Pakistani people by improving institutions they interact with every day. Furthermore, by improving the social and economic security of Pakistan, fewer people would be inclined to militarism.

== Reaction ==
Many Pakistanis were agitated by the terms of the act. Foremost was the Pakistani Army, which said there were "serious concerns" with the language and terms of the act. The Times of India also quoted a Foreign Office spokesperson saying "The Kerry-Lugar bill is not a negotiated document." An article in Time stated that "The backlash to Kerry-Lugar is fueled by a widely held perception that President Zardari has bowed too easily to foreign demands."

Pakistani perceived that America had tried to undermine the Pakistani Army through this Kerry-Lugar Bill. The bill's sponsor, Howard Berman said that: "Nor can we permit the Pakistani state – and its nuclear arsenal – to be taken over by the Taliban. To keep military aid flowing, Pakistan must also cooperate to dismantle nuclear supplier net-works by offering relevant information from or direct access to Pakistani nationals associated with such networks".

Republican lawmaker Dana Rohrabacher, opined on the floor that: "the threat of radical Islam is real, but it's not going to be solved by us being irresponsible, with billions in taxpayer money."

The then US envoy to Pakistan, Anne W. Patterson, heard a hot criticism over the Kerry-Lugar Bill from Pakistani COAS Gen Kayani and DG ISI Gen Pasha in a two-hour meeting on October 6, 2009. Gen Kayani had made clear to the Ambassador and accompanying Gen McCrystal, during that urgent meeting at GHQ, about his concerns. Gen Crystal understood the viewpoint of Pakistani Army and was not at all happy when he left the GHQ. Gen Kayani told them that there were elements in the bill that would set back the bilateral relationship, and critical provisions were almost entirely directed against the Army. The general was particularly irritated on clauses of civilian control of the military since he had no intention of taking over the government. "Had I wanted to do this, I would have done it during the long march [of March 2009]", Gen Kayani told the US Ambassador. The reported remarks of the American envoy were that rejection of the bill would be taken as an insult and smack of arrogant attitude but, contrarily, some clauses of the bill could also be termed as insult to the entire Pakistani nation.

Zardari's support for the bill left him isolated in Pakistani politics, including from some fellow cabinet members. While opposition to the Taliban has grown, so has opposition to U.S. intervention on Pakistani soil, which was reflected in a poll claiming as many as 80% of Pakistanis disapproved of the government's relationship with the U.S.

Opposition from the Pakistani military was staunch. Claude Rakisits of the World Politics Review wrote "The Pakistani top brass has seen this all before, and has not forgotten America's many broken promises over the past 50 years. Accordingly, they will keep their options -- including backchannels with the Taliban and other fellow travelers -- open, knowing that at the end of the day, the Americans have few alternatives available to them." Academic C. Christine Fair argued that the U.S. position under President George W. Bush where the U.S. insisted on effort to combat al Qaeda but "not insist that Pakistan shut down its support for all militant groups including the Taliban and those groups operating in India and Kashmir", further entrenched the Pakistani military's interests in maintaining links with such groups. She further argued that given the amount and ineffectiveness of aid donated between 2002 and 2008 ($11.2 billion, of which $8.1 billion was militarily related), more money will not solve the issue.

The U.S. House of Representatives' Foreign Relations Committee proposed defunding the new act on the grounds of Pakistan's reluctance on combating militant groups such as the Taliban. It was proposed by Representative Dana Rohrabacher (R-California). The committee, however, vetoed a further amendment which would cut all aid to Pakistan.

The Pakistani Army contended that the last draft of the Kerry-Lugar Bill they received on September 15, 2009, did not contain the 12 clauses which were added subsequently in the final version being most objectionable and derogatory. Thus on October 20, 2009, when US Senator John Kerry was in Pakistan to celebrate the [miscalculated] American success, his body language was totally exhausted indicating his disappointment during his Islamabad visit where he was having "so much difficulty in trying to give away 7.5 billion dollar aid." Although he was careful not to express his distress after meeting Pakistani politicians and military leaders, a frustrated Kerry ended up saying: "Take it or leave it; we should not play to cheap galleries here. If you don't want the money, say so. We're not forcing you to take it. We are giving to Pakistan about 7.5 billion dollars aid and also listening its complaints; we can spend this amount in California where it is badly needed."

Middle East Media Research Institute in its report on Kerry-Lugar Bill added the article of Pakistani columnist Farman Nawaz as a reference. According to the report "Debating the Pakistani National Interest over the Kerry-Lugar Bill" Farman Nawaz was the only Pakistani columnist who favoured the bill.
