= Gardner F. Williams =

American mining engineer and author (1842–1922)

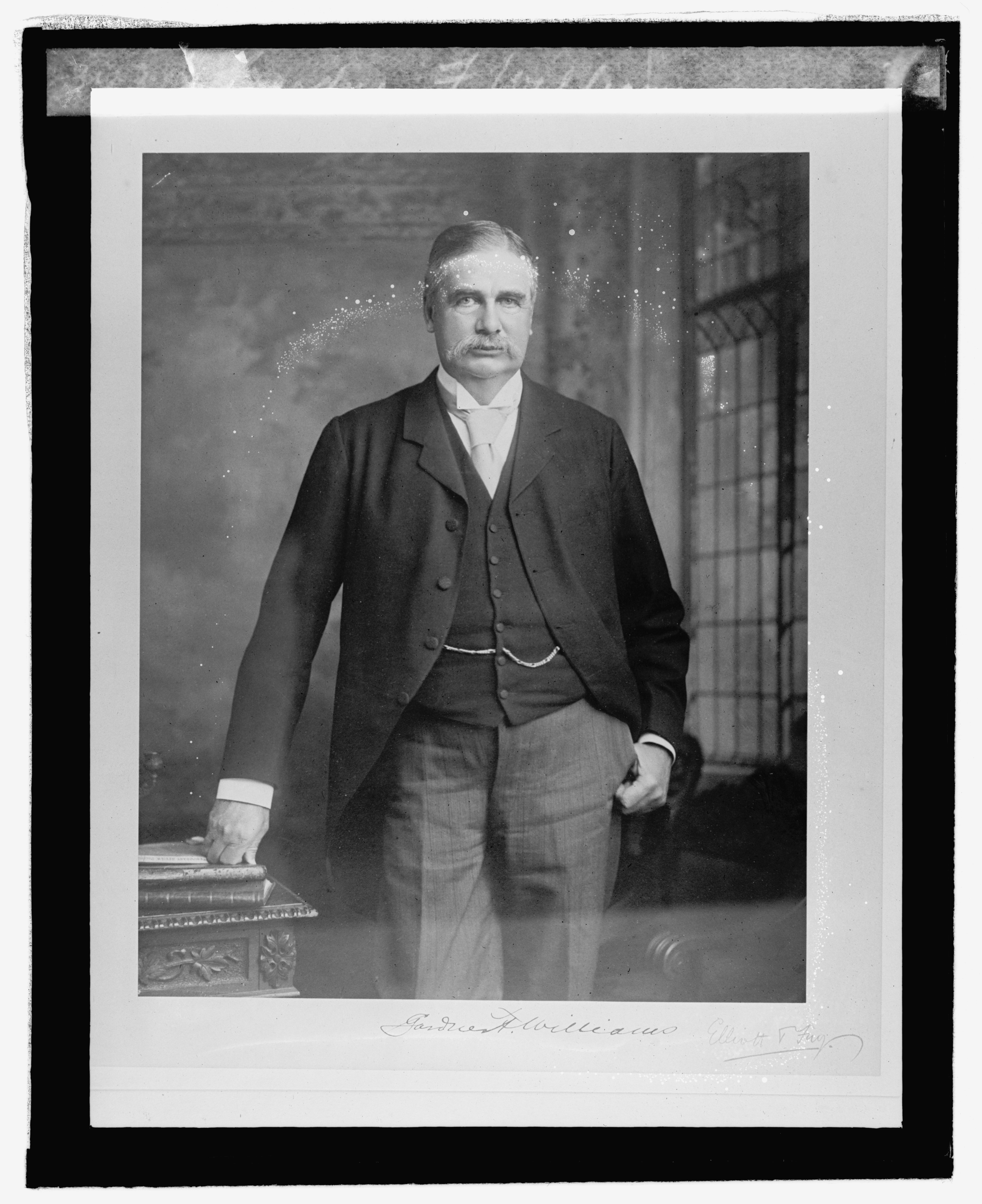
- Williams by Bain
- Born: Gardner Frederick Williams; 14 March 1842; Saginaw, Michigan, US
- Died: 22 August 1922 (aged 80); San Francisco, California, US
- Occupations: Engineer, author
- Known for: First properly trained mining engineer appointed in South Africa

Gardner Frederick Williams (14 March 1842 – 22 August 1922) was an American mining engineer and author, and the first properly trained mining engineer to be appointed in South Africa.

== Early life ==
Gardner Frederick Williams was born in Saginaw, Michigan, the oldest son of Alpheus Fuller Williams, who served for many years in the American frontier forces and rose to be a colonel. Alpheus became a civil and mining engineer and, even prior to having moved his family from Saginaw to California, became well known in the mining camps.

Gardner grew up in the Californian mining camps of Sierra and Yuba counties, surrounded by mining activity. His higher education began at the College of California (later to become the University of California), where he obtained a BA degree in 1865, and was completed in Freiberg, Saxony, Germany at the Royal School of Mines ("Freiberg Bergakademie": Freiberg Mining Academy – he helped Alfred Nobel refine techniques of blowing up rocks with Alfred's new invention, dynamite). His mining degree was conferred three years later and, in 1868, he returned to California and rounded off his education by gaining an MA at the university (the 1st such degree conferred there) in 1869.

== Early career ==
His mining experience began with a survey of the salt deposits on Carmen island off the coast of Mexico, followed by appointment as engineer to a syndicate in search of gold and silver in northern Nevada. (About this time, he took part in a gun battle with the Apache near what is now Tombstone, Arizona – the main casualties were two of the white men's horses). He then (before June 1873) became an assistant assayer in the US branch mint in San Francisco, and spent 3 1/2 years as superintendent of the Meadow Valley Mining Company at Pioche, Nevada. Early in 1875 he opened up a silver mine at Cherry Creek, and was later appointed manager of the Leeds Mining Company at Silver Reef, Utah. In 1879 he became the consulting engineer to a New York firm interested in hydraulic mining in California and, as a result, became superintendent of the Spring Valley Hydraulic Gold Company at Cherokee at the age of 37.

With such a varied career and with experience in so many areas of mining, particularly quartz and hydraulic mining, it was not unexpected that he should have been recommended to manage the properties known as The Transvaal Gold Exploration and Land Company at Pilgrim's Rest, Mpumalanga, Africa. He left America in 1884 to take up this position, travelling from Cape Town by train to De Aar and took the rest of the journey by coach.

== In South Africa ==
After a year at Pilgrim's Rest he resigned and spent some time visiting the new gold discoveries on the Witwatersrand. Full of ideas about the exploration of the goldfields, he returned to Kimberley and met, for the first time, young Cecil John Rhodes, who was then 32 years old. The two men travelled to England on the same ship and spent many hours discussing the gold and diamond enterprises in South Africa. Rhodes was most impressed by his companion's knowledge and enthusiasm.

In the US, two Americans had formed a company, The Exploration Company, in conjunction with Rothschilds in London. Their objective was to explore for gold. They persuaded Williams to return to South Africa as their consulting engineer. When Rhodes heard about this, he lost no time in getting in touch with Williams and persuaded him to cancel his agreement with The Exploration Company and to join De Beers Diamond Company. Under pressure from Rhodes, he agreed to forget about gold and move into the field of diamonds, and finally accepted an appointment as manager of De Beers in Kimberley in May 1887.

(This was during Rhode's legal struggle against the Barnato Mining Company. The result was the formation on 13 March 1888 of the De Beers Consolidated Mines Co., with Rhodes, Barney Barnato and Alfred Beit on the board.)

Williams immediately introduced wide changes in the mining methods at Kimberley. It had been the practice to dig haphazardly and to try to shore up the sides and roof of the diggings with masses of timber. Walking about was exceedingly dangerous and unpleasant, and there was a never-ending worry that the workings might collapse, with serious consequences for the lives of the workers and the financial success of the operation. Williams knew all about shaft-sinking and tunnelling and the use of explosives and, by the end of 1887, proper and relatively safe mining methods had been firmly established. Instead of haphazardly hoisting the ore from a large number of points, he arranged the mine so that all the ground could be concentrated at one point, and hoisted from one well-equipped level by a large winder. His methods were soon repeated on other mines, and on the Witwatersrand as well, and the Kimberley mines came to be known as the most advanced in the world.

In part due to these improvements in mining techniques, by 1889 Cecil Rhodes controlled the South African diamond mining industry, and fully 90% of world production.

Williams' talents spread far beyond mining. Rhodes had great confidence in his undoubted administrative skills and his talent for financial management, and drew him into the grand scheme of consolidating all the diamond mines under De Beers.

Williams laid the foundations for an excellent system of training apprentices at De Beers, a compulsory system which worked so well it was soon copied on the Witwatersrand. He had the miners' welfare at heart and, in 1892, reduced the underground shift from 12 to 8 hours. He was one of the chief promoters of the South African School of Mines and was chairperson of its governing body for the years between 1896 and 1903, during which it functioned in Kimberley.

In 1902 he published the comprehensive tome The Diamond Mines of South Africa; some account of their rise and development (NY: Macmillan Co, 1902) with later revised editions in 1904, 1905 and 1906 comprising 2 volumes. This work is still considered an important authoritative source today, with most of its 1,000 copies being housed in various university libraries of the world.

== Return to America ==
After 18 years with De Beers, Williams retired in 1905 to America, and settled first in Washington D.C. and in later years finally in San Francisco. His Washington DC residence on 2201 R Street NW was later used as offices by the embassy of Pakistan.

In recognition of his achievements, the Royal Academy of Science in Sweden awarded him its silver medal in 1905, and the University of California an honorary doctorate of laws in 1910. He also received an honorary doctorate of engineering from the University of Michigan in 1917.

Williams died in San Francisco in 1922, and is buried in a family plot in Oakland, California.
