= Sultan Mohammed Khan =

Pakistani civil servant

10th Foreign Secretary of Pakistan
- In office 1 July 1970 – 31 March 1972
- President: Yahya Khan; Zulfikar Ali Bhutto
- Preceded by: S.M Yusuf
- Succeeded by: Iftikhar Ali

Pakistan Ambassador to the United States
- In office 15 May 1972 – 8 December 1973
- President: Zulfikar Ali Bhutto
- Preceded by: N.A.M Raza
- Succeeded by: Sahabzada Yaqub Khan

Personal details
- Born: 19 February 1919 Jaora, Undivided India
- Died: 8 November 2010 (aged 91)
- Spouse: Abeda Sultan Khan
- Children: 4
- Education: Ewing Christian College
- Occupation: Civil servant Foreign service officer

Sultan Mohammed Khan (19 February 1919 – 8 November 2010) was a Pakistani civil servant and British India Army officer who served as a Foreign Secretary of Pakistan. He was also Pakistan's ambassador to the United States in the Nixon and Jimmy Carter presidency.

== Early life ==
Sultan Mohammed Khan was born in Jaora State, British India, on 19 February 1919. He received his bachelor's degree from Ewing Christian College.

== Career ==
Sultan Mohammed Khan joined the British Indian army as an officer cadet and was commissioned as a lieutenant in the 4th Indian Grenadiers, during World War II he served in India and the Malays-Indonesia front. He took an early release from the British Indian army as a major and after independence of Pakistan from the British, Khan joined the Pakistan's foreign service.

During his career as a diplomat, he served as a Pakistan ambassador to the United States, Canada, China, and Japan.

== Personal life ==
He married daughter of Jaora State ruler, Nawabzadi Abeda Sultan, in 1943. The couple had four children. He emigrated to the United States and lived a retired life in Maryland, United States.

== Book ==
- Memories & Reflections of a Pakistani Diplomat (1999)
