= Rizwan Saeed Sheikh =

Pakistani diplomat

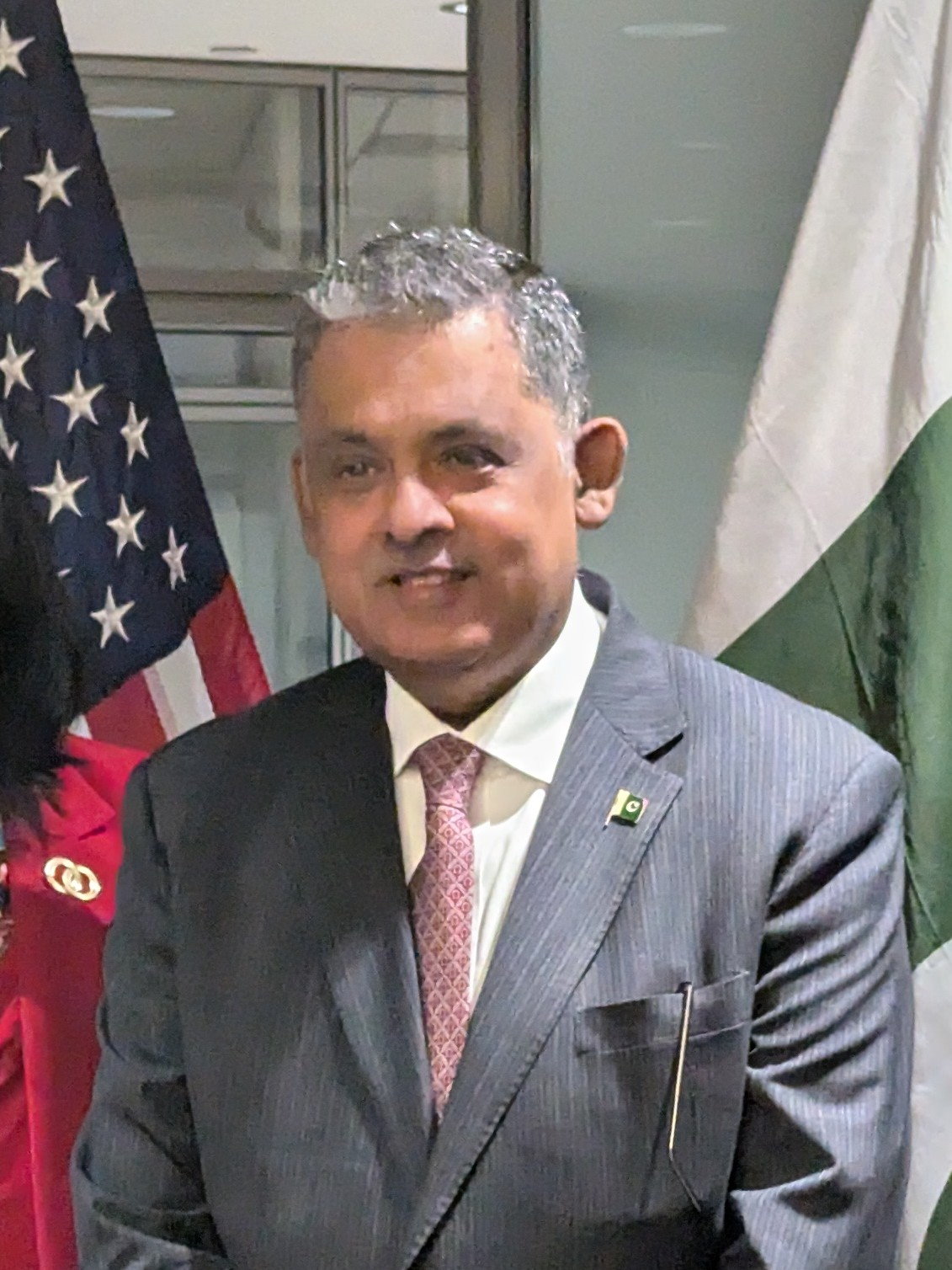
- Rizwan Saeed Sheikh in 2025

Pakistan's Ambassador to the United States
- Incumbent
- Assumed office 22 August 2024
- President: Asif Ali Zardari
- Prime Minister: Shehbaz Sharif
- Preceded by: Masood Khan

Rizwan Saeed Sheikh is a Pakistani diplomat who is current Pakistan's Ambassador to the United States, in office since 22 August 2024.

== Diplomatic career ==
Sheikh previously worked with the Independent Permanent Human Rights Commission of Organisation of Islamic Cooperation (OIC) and served as the spokesperson for the OIC secretary-general.

In June 2024, the Ministry of Foreign Affairs announced the appointment of Sheikh as Pakistan's new ambassador to the United States. At the time of his appointment, Sheikh was serving as the Additional Foreign Secretary for Middle East Affairs and was also overseeing the Special Investment Facilitation Council (SIFC) at the Foreign Office. His involvement with the SIFC is believed to have facilitated his close collaboration with Pakistan's military establishment, which likely contributed to his selection for the ambassadorship.

On 19 August, Sheikh arrived in Washington DC this week to assume his position as ambassador. On 22 August, he assumed the office of Pakistan's Ambassador to the United States.
