= French Pakistani =

French Pakistani or Pakistani French may refer to:

- France–Pakistan relations (c.f. "a French-Pakistani treaty")
- Mixed race people of French and Pakistani descent
- People with dual citizenship of France and Pakistan
- Pakistanis in France
- French people in Pakistan
