= Shafqat =

Given name

Shafqat is a masculine given name and surname of Arabic origin. Notable people with the name include:

== Given name ==
- Shafqat Ali (born 1965/66), Canadian politician
- Shafqat Amanat Ali (born 1965), Pakistani pop and classical singer, songwriter, composer
- Shafqat Baloch (died 2010), Pakistani military officer
- Shafqat Cheema (born 1955), Pakistani actor and producer
- Shafqat Ali Khan (born 1972), Pakistani classical singer of the khyal vocal genre
- Shafqat Mahmood (born 1950), Pakistani bureaucrat-turned-politician
- Shafqat Mahmood (politician) (born 1971), Pakistani politician, Member of the Provincial Assembly of the Punjab
- Shafqat Tanvir Mirza (1932–2012), Pakistani writer and a journalist
- Shafqat Rana (born 1943), former Pakistani cricketer
- Shafqat Rasool (born 1988), Pakistani field hockey player
- Pir Shafqat Hussain Shah Jilani (born 1949), Pakistani politician, member of the National Assembly of Pakistan
- Muhammad Shafqat Malik (born 1970), Pakistani field hockey player
- Sardar Shafqat Hayat Khan, Pakistani politician, member of the National Assembly of Pakistan

== Surname ==
- Mahmood Shafqat, Pakistani diplomat
- Masood Shafqat (born 1979), Pakistani politician, Member of the Provincial Assembly of the Punjab
- Suleman Shafqat (born 2001), Pakistani cricketer

== See also ==
- Shafqat Emmanuel and Shagufta Kausar blasphemy case, Pakistani Christian couple convicted of blasphemy with a sentence of death by hanging
- Shavkat
- Shivgad
