= Abdul Basit (diplomat) =

Pakistani diplomat

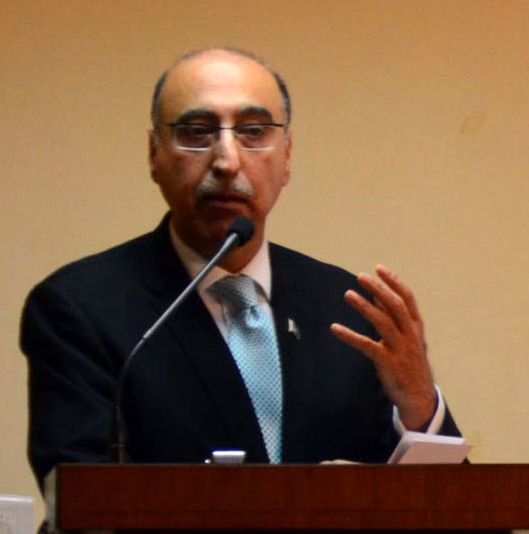

Pakistan High Commissioner to India
- In office 2014 – August, 2017
- President: Mamnoon Hussain
- Prime Minister: Nawaz Sharif; Shahid Khaqan Abbasi
- Preceded by: Salman Bashir
- Succeeded by: Sohail Mahmood

Personal details
- Parent(s): Muhammad Basit (father); Nusrat Jahan Begum (mother)
- Occupation: Diplomat

Abdul Basit Haqqani is a retired Pakistani diplomat who served as the former high commissioner of Pakistan to India. He was appointed to his position in 2014 and was based at the Pakistani High Commission in New Delhi. Previously, he served as Pakistan's ambassador to Germany from May 2012 to March 2014 and as Pakistan's high commissioner to Sri Lanka from 2000 to 2006.

Basit holds an MA in International Relations from the Quaid-i-Azam University and has been associated with the Ministry of Foreign Affairs of Pakistan since 1982, where he became its spokesperson. During his career, he has been posted at Moscow, New York, Sana'a, Geneva and London.

== Work ==
- Hostility: A Diplomat's Diary on Pakistan India Relations. HarperCollins. 2021. ISBN 9789354226977.

Diplomatic posts
Preceded by Salman Bashir	Pakistan High Commissioner to India; 2014–2017	Succeeded by Sohail Mahmood
