= France–Pakistan relations =

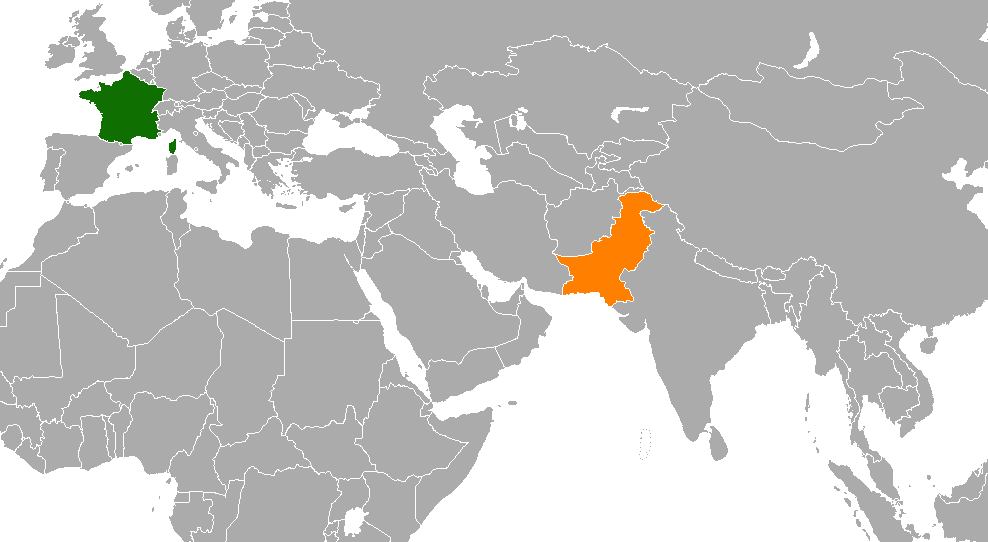
- France: Pakistan

Diplomatic mission
- Embassy of France, Islamabad: Embassy of Pakistan, Paris

Envoy
- French Ambassador to Pakistan Nicolas Galey: Pakistani Ambassador To Pakistan Mumtaz Zahra Baloch

France–Pakistan relations are the bilateral, cultural, and international relations between Pakistan and France. The relationship is based on military, defence, cultural, educational cooperation, and economic ties. Trade between the two countries is generally increasing with time.

== History ==
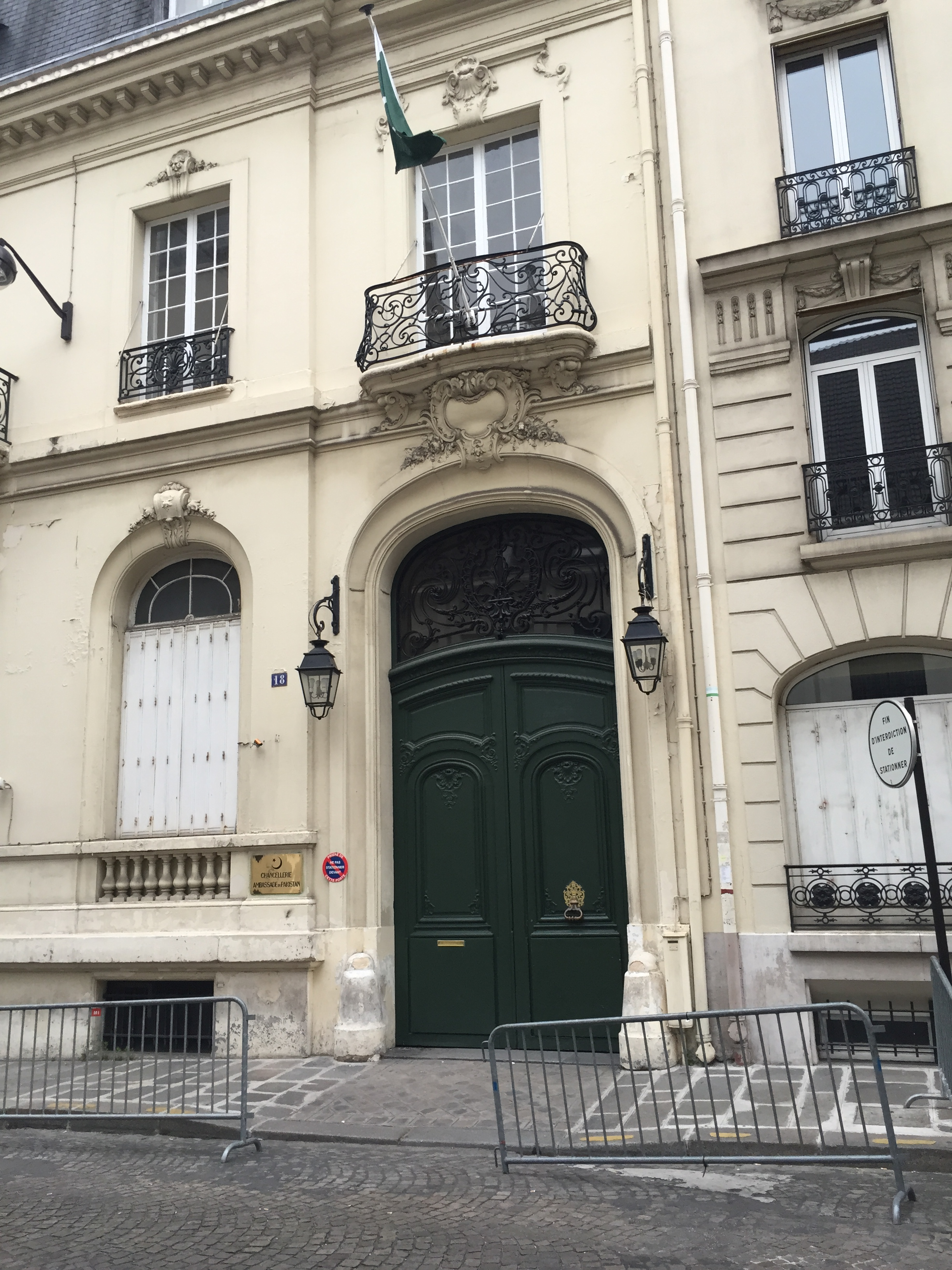
Embassy of Pakistan in Paris

The foreign relations between Pakistan and France were first established on 31 July 1951 when both countries agreed to open embassy services in each countries. France was one of the first non-Muslim states to recognize Pakistan, opening its embassy about 2 months after Pakistani independence In August 1960, a farewell trade treaty was signed; followed by import-export treaty that was concluded October 1966. During the Cold War, France considered Pakistan as "state deserving attention", and had been a major foreign supplier of Pakistan Armed Forces.

After the Cold War, France's foreign policy has been noted for decades for its special Gaullist flavour, which was not much altered under the long Presidency of socialist François Mitterrand (1981-1995). French Presidents visited India more often than Pakistan, and Paris has never met the expectations of Islamabad regarding the U.N. resolutions on Kashmir. The relations again suffered many set back in 1998-99 when Paris saw the Kargil episode as a dangerous Pakistan initiative, considering the new nuclearised regional context. Though, France has always been to encourage dialogue between India and Pakistan, without offering mediation in such an intricate issue. There was some impatience in Paris decision-makers circles when the Line of Control was crossed above Kargil in an obviously well prepared operation.

=== Military and strategic cooperation ===
Since 1967, France had been an important partner, particularly for PAF and the Navy. In 1967, France sold first batch of its Mirage fighters as well as sold the submarine technology to Pakistan. The PAF bought second-hand batch of Mirage fighters in 1990; followed by a contract signing in 1996 for the acquisition of 40 reconnaissance aircraft. The PAF is the largest customer of France's aerospace industry with numbers of fighter and civilian aircraft having been sold to Pakistan since 1967 till the 2000s. The Navy has also an established defence connection with France, the best known purchasing of Daphné class submarine and the submarine technology transfer of the Agost class which was signed in 1994.

In 2009, France agreed to provide financial capital to expand the use of nuclear power in Pakistan. While, the officials at Islamabad termed it as "significant move", the Foreign service office maintained that: "France has agreed to transfer civilian nuclear technology to Pakistan." The French Foreign ministry had confirmed that the country was ready, within the framework of its international agreements, to "co-operate with Pakistan" in the field of nuclear safety. "This is so the Pakistan's programme can develop in the best conditions of safety and security", the French foreign officials added to APP. After the agreement, France maintained that "this is the beginning of a civil nuclear partnership and the cooperation will be limited to nuclear safety."

In May 2011, France stopped selling heavy military equipment to Pakistan in order to ease Indian concerns. During a visit to India, the French defence minister Gérard Longuet said France did not want to be seen "feeding Pakistan’s military ambitions".

=== Trade and economic relations ===
The first trade agreement was signed in 1966, and Pakistan is currently ranked as 65th import partner of France. The bilateral trade was reached to US$313 million in 2009.

=== Cultural relations ===
The French language has attracted interest among learners in Pakistan, though its overall popularity has declined in recent years. According to a French linguistics specialist, enrollment in French-language courses has shown a modest downward trend, with approximately 60 students per semester studying French at the National University of Modern Languages (NUML). Motivations for learning French include opportunities for higher education abroad and family sponsorship or migration pathways. Instruction and cultural outreach related to the French language in Pakistan are supported by the Alliance Française, which promotes French language education and Francophone culture.

=== Charlie Hebdo protests ===
In 2020, thousands of protesters opposing France's defense of freedom of speech held rallies in cities across Pakistan, against the re-publishing of the Charlie Hebdo cartoons of the Islamic prophet Muhammed, including publishing controversial images. They called on the Pakistani government to cut diplomatic and trade ties with France, which was quickly reported on by TRT World. The protesters burnt the French flag and said they were willing to avenge what they considered to be blasphemy against Muhammed in a peaceful way.

In April 2021, the French government advised French nationals and French companies to temporarily leave Pakistan amid violent anti-French protests by the TLP party and meanwhile the Government of Pakistan clearly told the TLP party that Pakistan will not tell the French ambassador to leave the country and the Government will protect the French friendship at any cost. Thus then, Pakistan banned the radical far-right TLP party.

== Visit to France by Pakistani Army Chief ==
From 13 June 2022 to 17 June 2022, COAS Qamar Javed Bajwa attended the Eurosatory International Defence and Security exhibition. No protest was held by the Tehreek-e-Labbaik Pakistan nor did they condemn it. Further cementing and confirming that the party has close links to the military.

== Resident diplomatic missions ==
- France has an embassy in Islamabad.
- Pakistan has an embassy in Paris.

== List of ambassadors of Pakistan to France ==
Diplomatic agrément/Diplomatic accreditation	Ambassador	Observations	Presidents and/or prime ministers of Pakistan	Prime ministers of France	Term end
24 November 1950	Muhammad Nawaz Khan (diplomat)		Khawaja Nazimuddin	Vincent Auriol	
15 March 1952	Habib Ibrahim Rahimtoola		Malik Ghulam Muhammad	Vincent Auriol	
13 October 1953	Mohammed Ikramullah		Malik Ghulam Muhammad	Vincent Auriol	
5 April 1957	Mohammad Mir Khan		Iskander Mirza	René Coty	
10 March 1960	Nawabzada Agha Mohammad Raza	(born 14.5 1905) graduated from Royal Military College Sandhurst 1927, Ambassador to Iran since February 1955, Ambassador to China 1951-1954 & 22.8.1962-1966; as Pakistan's Ambassador to Mongolia, in 1965.22 October 1971 - 22 April 1972: Pakistan Ambassador to the United States	Ayub Khan (Field Marshal)	Charles de Gaulle	
21 December 1962	Jalaludin Abdur Rahim	(جلال الدين عبدرالرحيم)	Ayub Khan (Field Marshal)	Charles de Gaulle	
17 September 1966	Ikbal Athar		Ayub Khan (Field Marshal)	Charles de Gaulle	
22 November 1968	Samiulla Khan Dehlavi		Yahya Khan (President + Commander in Chief of PAK Army)	Charles de Gaulle	
24 March 1972	Sahabzada Yaqub Khan		Zulfikar Ali Bhutto	Georges Pompidou	
2 January 1974	Mahmood Shafqat		Fazal Ilahi Chaudhry	Valéry Giscard d’Estaing	
28 April 1976	Muzaffar Ali Khan Qizilbash		Fazal Ilahi Chaudhry	Valéry Giscard d’Estaing	
31 July 1978	Iqbal Ahmed Akhund		Mohammed Zia ul-Haq	Valéry Giscard d’Estaing	
20 November 1980	Sahabzada Yaqub Khan		Mohammed Zia ul-Haq	Valéry Giscard d’Estaing	
18 June 1982	Jamsheed Marker		Mohammed Zia ul-Haq	François Mitterrand	
17 October 1986	Niaz Ahmed Naik	(born on 31 May 1926; 8 Aug 2009) 11 July 1982 – 30 May 1986 Foreign Secretary (Pakistan) Architect of Pakistans 'track 2 diplomacy with India during the 1999 Kargil conflict, has been tortured and murdered by unidentified persons at his residence here, police said on Saturday. served as Ambassador to Parepun Geneva from 1971 to 1974, Parepun New York from 1978 to 1982	Mohammed Zia ul-Haq	François Mitterrand	
21 September 1988	Shahid M. Amin	1985-1988 Ambassador to Moscow, 1995: Ambassador to Riyadh.	Ghulam Ishaq Khan	François Mitterrand	
17 October 1990	Tanvir Ahmad Khan		Ghulam Ishaq Khan	François Mitterrand	
7 January 1992	Saidulla Khan Dehlavi		Ghulam Ishaq Khan	François Mitterrand	
18 May 1999	Shahryar Khan		Muhammad Rafiq Tarar	Jacques Chirac	
4 September 2001	Musa Javed Chohan	(موسی جاوید چوہان)	Pervez Musharraf	Jacques Chirac	
4 November 2003	Aneesuddin Ahmed	(Born on 11 December 1946) January 1993-July 1996: High Commissioner to South Africa July 1996-June 2000 Ambassador to Lebanon.	Pervez Musharraf	Jacques Chirac	
19 April 2007	Asma Anisa		Pervez Musharraf	Nicolas Sarkozy	
15 January 2010	Shafkat Saeed		Asif Ali Zardari	Nicolas Sarkozy	
22 February 2013	Ghalib Iqbal		Asif Ali Zardari	François Hollande	
July 2016	Moin ul Haq		Asif Ali Zardari	François Hollande	July 30, 2020
November 2022	Asim Iftikhar Ahmad		Arif Alvi	Emmanuel Macron	December 2024
January 2025	Mumtaz Zahra Baloch		Asif Ali Zardari	Emmanuel Macron	

== See also ==
- Foreign relations of France
- Foreign relations of Pakistan
- Mehmood Bhatti (fashion designer)
- Musa Javed Chohan: former ambassador of Pakistan to France and recipient of the Ordre National du Merite for the promotion of bilateral cooperation between France and Pakistan.
- French people in Pakistan
- Karachi affair
- Pakistanis in France
