= Sohail Mahmood =

Pakistani politician

His Excellency Sohail Mahmood سھیل محمود
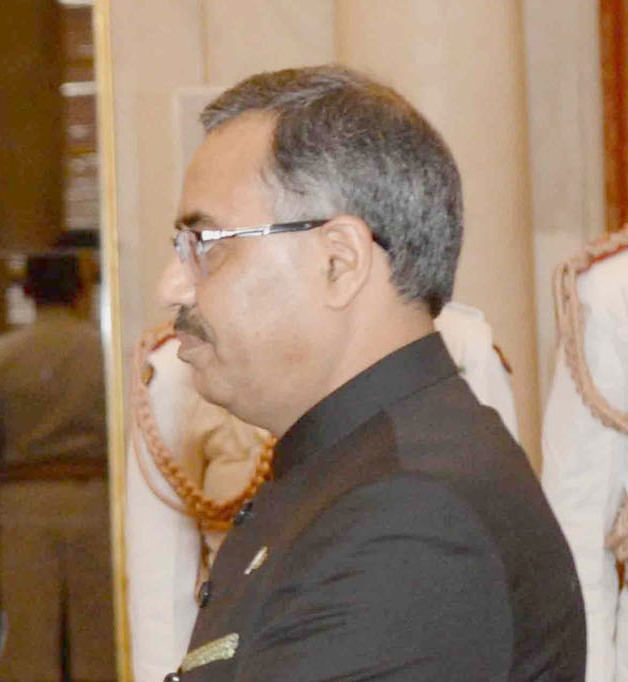

7th Secretary General of the D-8 Organization for Economic Cooperation
- Incumbent
- Assumed office January 1, 2026
- Preceded by: Isiaka Abdulqadir Imam

30th Foreign Secretary of Pakistan
- In office April 2019 – September 2022
- President: Arif Alvi
- Prime Minister: Imran Khan; Shehbaz Sharif
- Preceded by: Tehmina Janjua
- Succeeded by: Asad Majeed Khan

High Commissioner of Pakistan to India
- In office August 2017 – April 2019
- President: Mamnoon Hussain; Arif Alvi
- Prime Minister: Shahid Khaqan Abbasi; Imran Khan
- Preceded by: Abdul Basit
- Succeeded by: Moin-ul-Haq

Sohail Mahmood (Urdu: سہیل محمود) is a Pakistani diplomat who has served as the Secretary General of the D-8 Organization for Economic Cooperation since 2026. He previously served as the 30th Foreign Secretary of Pakistan from 2019 to 2022.

== Career ==
Mahmood joined the Foreign Service of Pakistan in 1985.

He served as the Ambassador of Pakistan to Thailand and the Permanent Representative of Pakistan to UNESCAP from 2009 to 2013. He later served as the Ambassador of Pakistan to Türkiye with concurrent accreditation to North Macedonia and Kosovo. Prior to assuming the office of Foreign Secretary, Mahmood served as the High Commissioner of Pakistan to India from 2017 to 2019.

Mahmood served as the Foreign Secretary of Pakistan from April 2019 until his retirement in September 2022.

After his retirement, Mahmood served as the Director-General of the Institute of Strategic Studies Islamabad (ISSI) in January 2023. He discharged the role of Director-General of ISSI in January 2026.

In January 2026, Mahmood assumed the office of Secretary-General of the D-8 Organization for Economic Cooperation.

Diplomatic posts
Preceded by Tehmina Janjua	Foreign Secretary of Pakistan; 2019–2022	Succeeded by Asad Majeed Khan
