= French people in Pakistan =

- (France) (Pakistan)
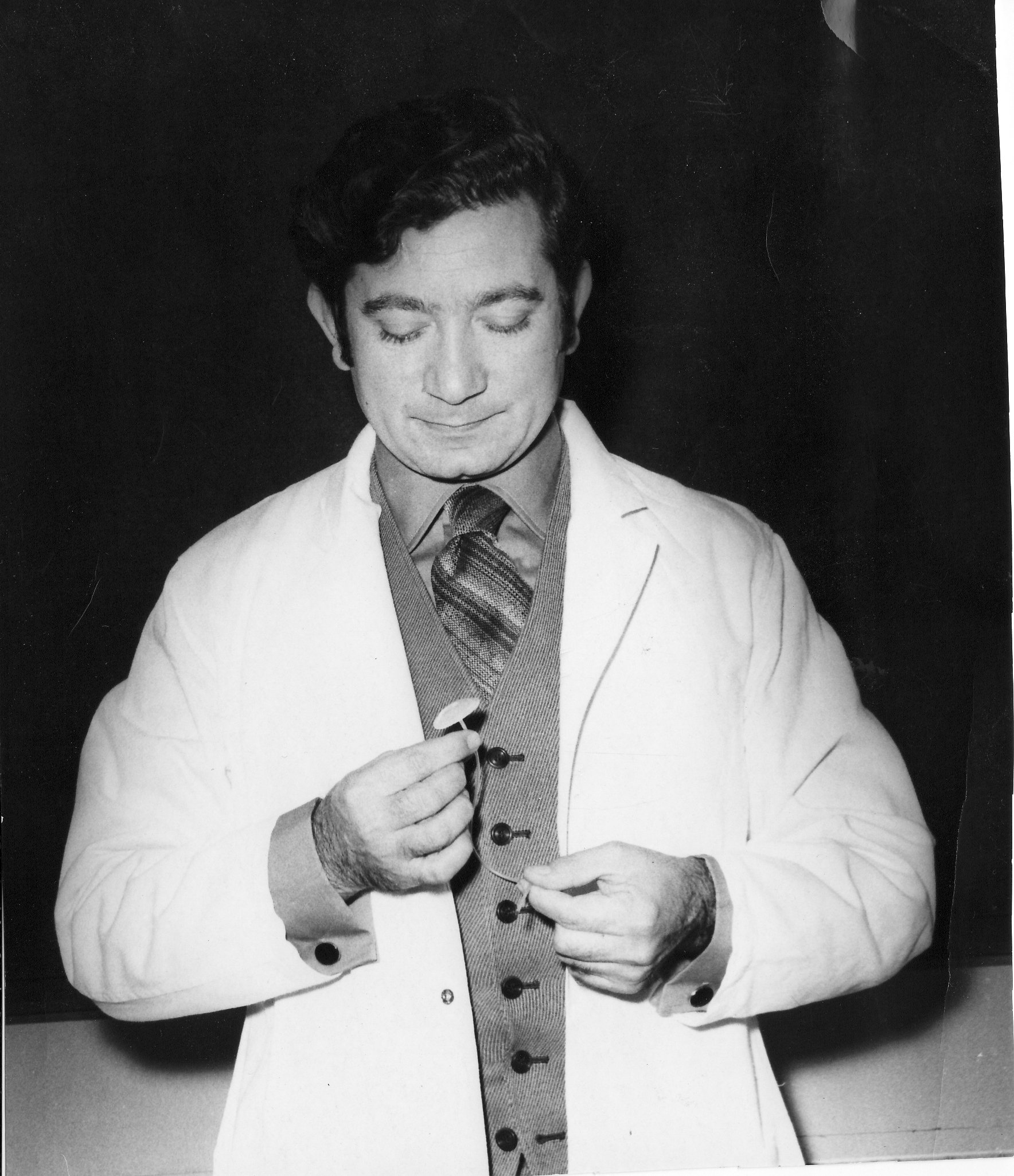
- Ayub K. Ommaya, Sadaf Malaterre

Total population
- 3,900

Regions with significant populations
- Islamabad, Karachi and Lahore

Languages
- French · Urdu

Religion
- Christianity · Islam

Related ethnic groups
- French diaspora

There are a small number of French people in Pakistan, consisting mostly of expatriates, employees, French spouses married to Pakistanis and French people of Pakistani descent who moved back into the country, along with Pakistani-born people of French ancestry. There are under 4000 French expatriates in Pakistan. French nationals are working in various branches of Alliance française in Lahore, Karachi and Islamabad for promotion of French culture and language while also teaching French as a second language to the locals. They are also working as visiting faculties in educational institutes such as Pakistan Institute of Fashion and Design.

== Education ==
The École Française d'Islamabad and the École Française de Karachi were formerly in operation.

== Notable people ==
- Julien Columeau - Urdu novelist
- Osman Khalid Butt - actor
- Sonya Jehan - actress
- Sadaf Malaterre - Fashion designer
- Ayub K. Ommaya - scientist

== See also ==
- France-Pakistan relations
- Pakistanis in France
