= Moin ul Haque =

Pakistani diplomat

Moin ul Haq

Ambassador of Pakistan to China
- In office August 2020 – Nov 2023
- Preceded by: Naghmana Hashmi
- Succeeded by: Khalil Hashmi

High Commissioner of Pakistan to India
- Preceded by: Sohail Mehmood

Ambassador of Pakistan to France

Personal details
- Profession: Diplomat
- Known for: Diplomatic services in France, India, and China

Moin ul Haque is a Pakistani diplomat who has served in various high-profile positions, including as Pakistan's first Consul General in Vancouver, Canada, Pakistan's Ambassador to France and Ambassador to China.

== Career ==
He joined the Foreign Service of Pakistan in 1987.

=== Ambassador to France ===
Moin ul Haque served as Pakistan's Ambassador to France from July 2016 to July 2020.

=== High Commissioner to India ===
In 2019, Moin ul Haque was appointed as Pakistan's High Commissioner to India, but could not proceed after abrogation of the special status of Jammu and Kashmir by India.

=== Ambassador to China ===
Moin ul Haque served as Pakistan's Ambassador to China from August 2020 to November 2023.
