= Organization for Economic Cooperation =

Organization for Economic Cooperation may refer to:

- D-8 Organization for Economic Cooperation
- Economic Cooperation Organization
- Organisation for Economic Co-operation and Development
- Organization of the Black Sea Economic Cooperation
