= École Française d'Islamabad =

Coordinates: 33.7170°N 73.0639°E

Information
- Other name: École Française Alfred Foucher
- Established: 1979
- Closed: 2008
- Age: 3 to 18
- Language: French

École Française d'Islamabad (EFI) or the École Française Alfred Foucher was a French international school in Diplomatic Enclave I in Islamabad, Pakistan, serving maternelle (preschool) through lycée (senior high school). Students in the secondary levels used the distance education programme of the National Centre for Distance Education.

The school was affiliated with the French embassy and the French cultural centre.

== History ==
The school was established in 1979 and moved to its final facility in 1993.

After the September 11 attacks in the United States, 26 families with children that were enrolled at the EFI left Pakistan by the end of that month. By November 2001, the student body had recovered somewhat, with 14 new students enrolled.

In 2002, after an attack at a convent school in Murree, the French school and the cultural centre were closed for one year. In October 2008, the French government had the school and the cultural centre closed for an indefinite period. Adrien Arbouche, the embassy's press councillor, stated that there were security concerns over the operation of the school. The closure was criticised by the Pakistani government and the parents of the school's students.

== Student body ==
In 2006, there were 63 students at the school, of whom 59% were non-French and 41% French. At the time, 49 were primary students and 14 were secondary students. By 2008, the number of students had reduced to 50.

== See also ==
- French people in Pakistan
