= List of high commissioners of Pakistan to Sri Lanka =

The current Pakistani High Commissioner to Sri Lanka is Shahzad Chaudhary, a former Air Vice Marshal. He succeeded Bashir Wali Mohammed, a retired army colonel.

Appointed / letter of commission	High Commissioner		List of presidents of Pakistan		Date
1963	Enver Murad		Ayub Khan (field marshal)	Sirimavo Bandaranaike	1967
1964	Sidiq Ali Khan	Shakeel Ahmed, Maj Gen (Retired) By PM Nawaz Sharif in Mar 2015	Ayub Khan (field marshal)	Sirimavo Bandaranaike	
1978	Tariq M. Mir		Muhammad Zia-ul-Haq	Ranasinghe Premadasa	
2000	Abdul Basit Haqqani		Muhammad Rafiq Tarar	Sirimavo Bandaranaike	
20 August 2006	Bashir Wali Mohammed		Pervez Musharraf	Ratnasiri Wickremanayake	
1 April 2007	Shahzad Chaudhary		Pervez Musharraf	Ratnasiri Wickremanayake	
18 June 2011	Seema Ilahi Baloch		Asif Ali Zardari	D. M. Jayaratne	3 December 2012
2 November 2013	Amna Baloch	Acting High Commissioner of Pakistan	Asif Ali Zardari	D. M. Jayaratne	
19 March 2013	Qasim Qureshi		Asif Ali Zardari	D. M. Jayaratne	
