= D-8 Technology Transfer and Exchange Network =

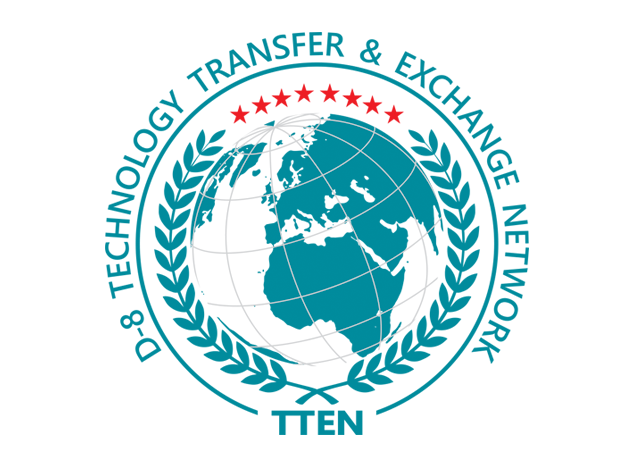
- Formation: 2012
- Members: 9: Azerbaijan Bangladesh Egypt Indonesia Iran Malaysia Nigeria Pakistan Turkey
- Secretariat: Pardis Technology Park, Iran
- President: Milad Sadr-Khanlou
- NaCOs: 8: Bangladesh Council of Scientific and Industrial Research (BCSIR) Academy of Scientific Research and Technology (ASRT) National Research and Innovation Agency (BRIN) Iran National Technomart Center (INTC) Ministry of Science, Technology and Innovation (MOSTI) National Office For Technology Acquisition And Promotion (NOTAP) Engineering Development Board (EDB) Scientific and Technological Research Council of Turkey (TÜBİTAK)
- Website: www.d8tten.org

The D-8 Technology Transfer and Exchange Network (D-8 TTEN) is an affiliated body of the D-8 Organization for Economic Cooperation, which is consisted of national coordination organizations (NaCO) from Bangladesh, Egypt, Indonesia, Iran, Malaysia, Nigeria, Pakistan, and Turkey. The network aims to facilitate the transfer of technology among member countries, and to fulfill technology market functions. It also pursues missions such as capacity building and information dissemination on technological capabilities, achievements, and needs of the D-8 member countries. The D-8 TTEN organizes technology transactions and creates coordination and synergism among member countries. To boost the technology-business atmosphere, various instruments are enacted, including a databank of requests and offers, support to participate in exhibitions, workshops, business meetings, creating investment and technology transfer and hi-tech products exchange opportunities, etc.

== History ==
The D-8 TTEN was established after a series of conferences and meetings, starting with the proposal of an initial plan in Bali, Indonesia, in 2008. The plan underwent revisions in subsequent conferences, leading to its approval during the third conference of Ministers of Industry in Dhaka, Bangladesh, in 2012.

The network has facilitated knowledge transfer among member countries, leading to the exchange of over 160 technologies. Key milestones include the establishment of the network, feasibility assessments, brainstorming sessions, and the launch of a web portal for technology sharing. The D-8 TTEN has organized various activities such as technology tours, awards for technology transfer contracts, and dedicated meetings such as the High Council Meetings. Notable events include the Technology Investment Meetings, Business-Technology Meetings, and workshops organized by member countries.

The ongoing efforts of the D-8 TTEN focus on technology transfer, strategic partnerships with the Islamic Development Bank, and recognition through the D-8 TTEN Technology Transfer Award.

== Programs ==
=== Technology Transfer Award (TTA) ===
The D-8 TTEN Secretariat annually awards the best technology transfer contract between one of the eight member countries of D-8 and the member countries of the Organization of Islamic Cooperation (OIC). This award is granted to the most exemplary case of technology transfer involving two private technology companies.

The idea of instituting this award was introduced during the second High Council Meeting of the D-8 TTEN in Nigeria in 2014. Representatives from member countries approved the proposal, deciding to present the award on an annual basis. The "Technology Transfer Award" is given in adherence to regulations and recognizes outstanding technology transfer cases between D-8 member countries and other Islamic nations. Evaluation criteria include the technological capabilities of the providing company, the financial volume of the contract, the timeframe for the technology transfer, the method used, and the rate of return on the capital of the recipient.

The prize includes a certificate signed by the Secretaries of the D-8 organization and the D-8 TTEN, complimentary attendance of winning companies to a D-8 TTEN event with covered travel and accommodation expenses, and a cash prize of $5,000 for each party involved in the contract.

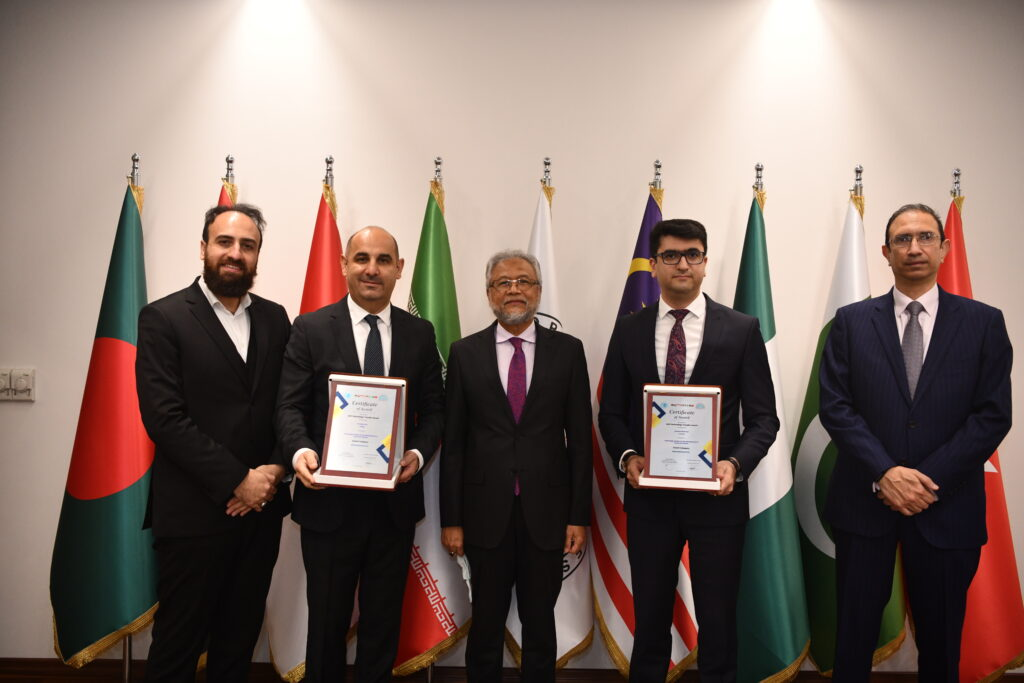
The second TTA in Istanbul, Turkey, in 2021.

==== History ====
The inaugural Technology Transfer Award (TTA) took place in Izmir, Turkey, in 2016, acknowledging the most outstanding technology transfer of 2015. The winning contract, valued at $20 million, involved collaboration between the Iranian AryoGen Pharmed Company and the Malaysian Inno Bio Ventures for the advancement of biosimilar drugs.

Subsequent TTAs occurred in Istanbul, Turkey, in 2021, and Ankara, Turkey, in 2022, recognizing technology transfer projects from various countries. The winning contract in 2021 focused on anti-cancer drugs, while the 2022 award was granted to an agreement between an Iranian company, Fanavaran Nano-meghyas, and a Malaysian counterpart, Progene Link, for the transfer of technology in producing nano-electrospinning devices.

=== Technology Investment Meeting (TIM) ===
The Technology Investment Meeting (TIM) serves as a platform to connect investors from member countries and other Islamic nations, fostering collaboration among industry participants. The primary objective is to synergize efforts between technology sector stakeholders, including funds, investment companies, entrepreneurs, and start-up ventures. The focus is on innovation, exposing investment opportunities, and setting ambitious goals for investing in technological projects.

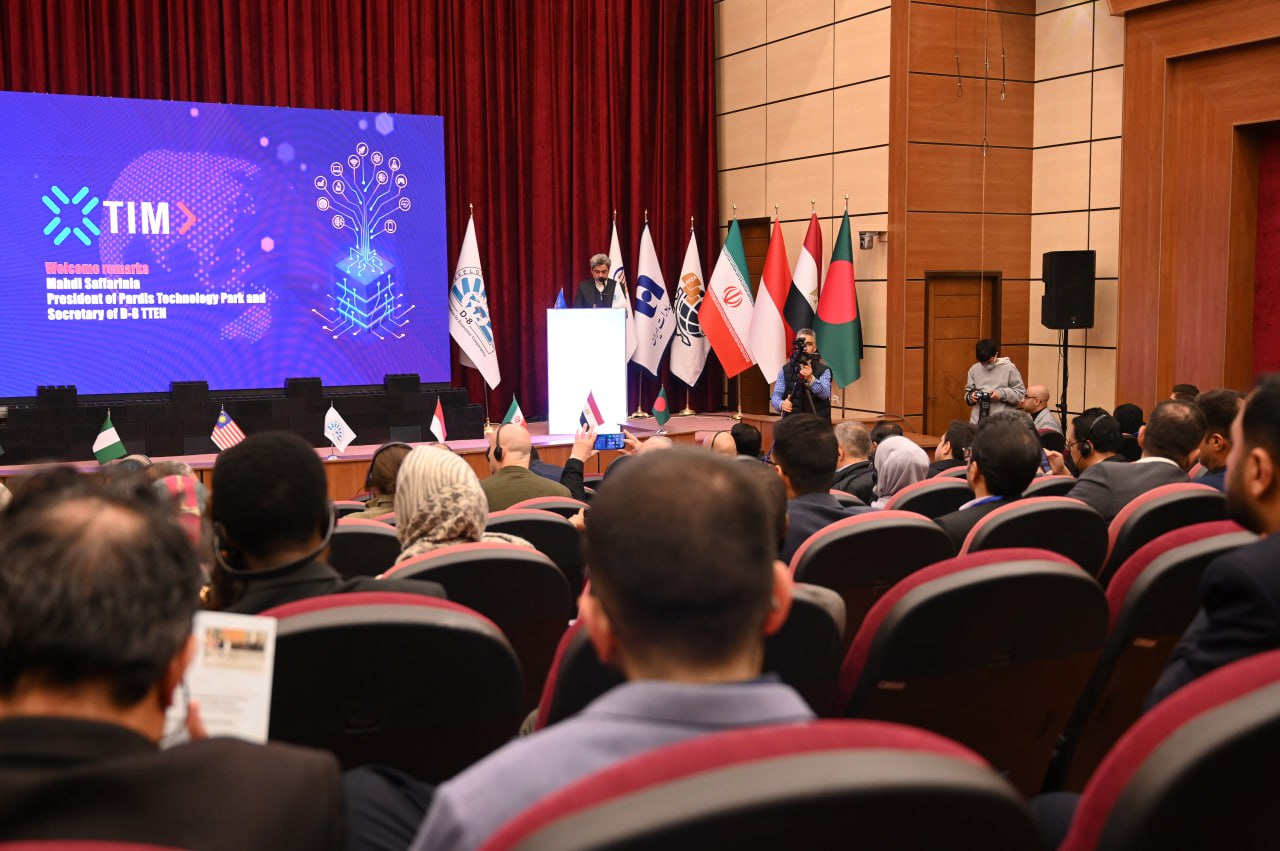
The 5th Technology Investment Meeting (TIM 2023) in Tehran Pardis Technology Park.

==== History ====
The inaugural D-8 Technology Investment Meeting was hosted by Pardis Technology Park in November 2017, organized in collaboration with the campus technology park as the secretariat of the D-8 Technology Transfer and Exchange Network. Over two days, more than 30 venture funds and technology investment companies from Iran, Turkey, Indonesia, Malaysia, Bangladesh, Nigeria, and Pakistan participated. Notable outcomes included over 30 business meetings, the signing of 2 memorandums of cooperation, and the execution of a $22 million investment contract during this initial meeting.

The second edition in February 2020 showcased a synergistic approach between domestic and foreign investors, with over 160 participants, including 35 investment specialists from 18 non-Iranian nationalities. Despite challenging conditions due to international embargoes, the meeting achieved its predetermined goals. Among the accomplishments was the signing of a memorandum of understanding for the purchase of medical equipment worth $550,000.

The third round, held in February 2021, adopted a combined virtual and in-person format due to the COVID-19 pandemic. The meeting featured the signing of a contract for the manufacture of 700 hemodialysis machines and the participation of investors and idea makers from various countries.

The fourth round of the TIM2022 technology investment meeting took place in February 2022, attracting over 330 participants from 28 countries. This event, conducted in person, included B2B meetings, the signing of memorandums and contracts, and the establishment of the D-8 joint investment fund. Noteworthy outcomes encompassed more than 120 B2B meetings, two specialized panels, 10 keynote speeches, and contracts and memorandums valued at over $10.6 million.

=== Business Technology Meeting (BTM) ===
To facilitate technology exchange and promote the market expansion of technological products among member countries, the D-8 TTEN Secretariat proposed organizing targeted gatherings focused on specific areas of demand. Subsequently, the Secretariat developed a plan outlining the content and operational framework for these meetings. The gatherings are structured based on the host country's identification of the desired domain, with input from the representative or designated agent of the network in that country. Once the subject matter is confirmed, companies and advocates in the designated field are invited to participate in the network's business gathering, where negotiations can take place with counterparts from other member countries to establish collaborative partnerships.

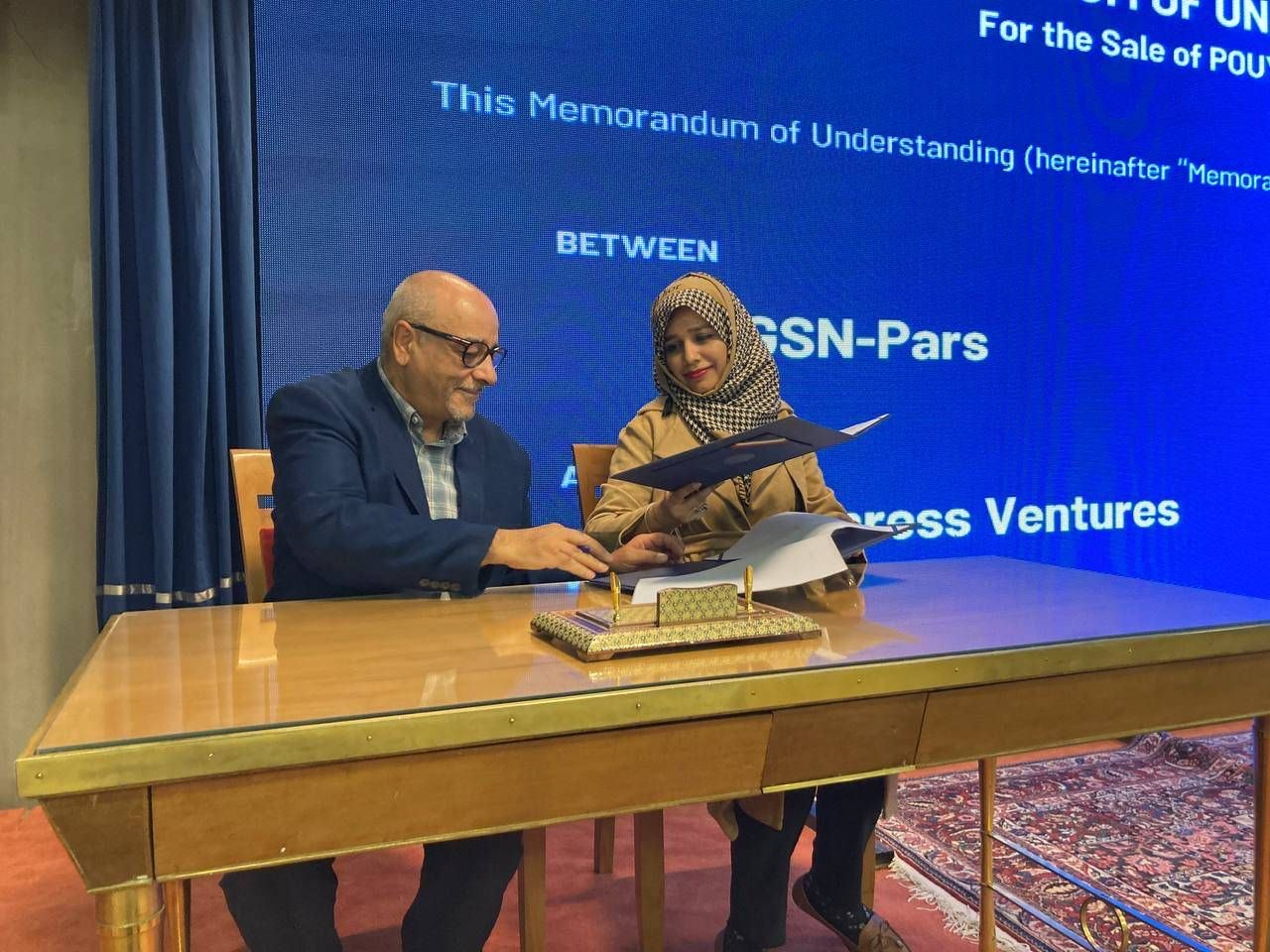
The 4th Business & Technology Meeting (BTM2023) in Isfahan, Iran.

==== History ====
The inaugural Business Technology Meeting (BTM) was hosted by The Scientific and Industrial Research Council of Bangladesh, the national coordination organization of the network, in Dhaka. The focus was on biotechnology, specifically biopharmaceutical and biosimilar technologies and products. The meeting aimed to introduce technologies and companies, resulting in agreements and cooperation across various fields.

The second BTM, hosted by Iran's International Innovation and Technology Exhibition (INOTEX2018) in Tehran in July 2018, centered on the renewable energy sector. Representatives from Iran, Nigeria, and Malaysia attended, and the meeting featured a keynote speech, a panel discussion, and business presentations to enhance its appeal to Member States. The panelists discussed the role of startups and SMEs in boosting technology transfer in renewable energy and highlighted initiatives supporting startups and SMEs in this field. Iranian and Nigerian businesses showcased their projects and products.

The third BTM, organized by The Presidential Innovation and Prosperity Fund in Tehran in December 2021, focused on mining and metal industries, conducted both in person and online. Eight foreign companies from D-8 member nations (Iran, Turkey, Malaysia, Pakistan) and guests from other nations (Iraq and Kyrgyzstan) presented their investment interests and technological requirements. Additionally, 12 top startups from D-8 member countries showcased their skills. The event included negotiations and B2B sessions between technology suppliers and customers, aligning with the planned objectives of the gathering.

== High Council Meeting (HCM) ==
Member countries convene High Council Meetings within their respective territories, where government representatives gather to make decisions, devise solutions, and formulate policies aimed at propelling technological progress within their nations. These council events serve as a platform for member countries to present reports on their technological development endeavors, fostering the sharing of experiences and recent advancements. Simultaneously, technology companies from member countries participate in side events held alongside these council meetings.

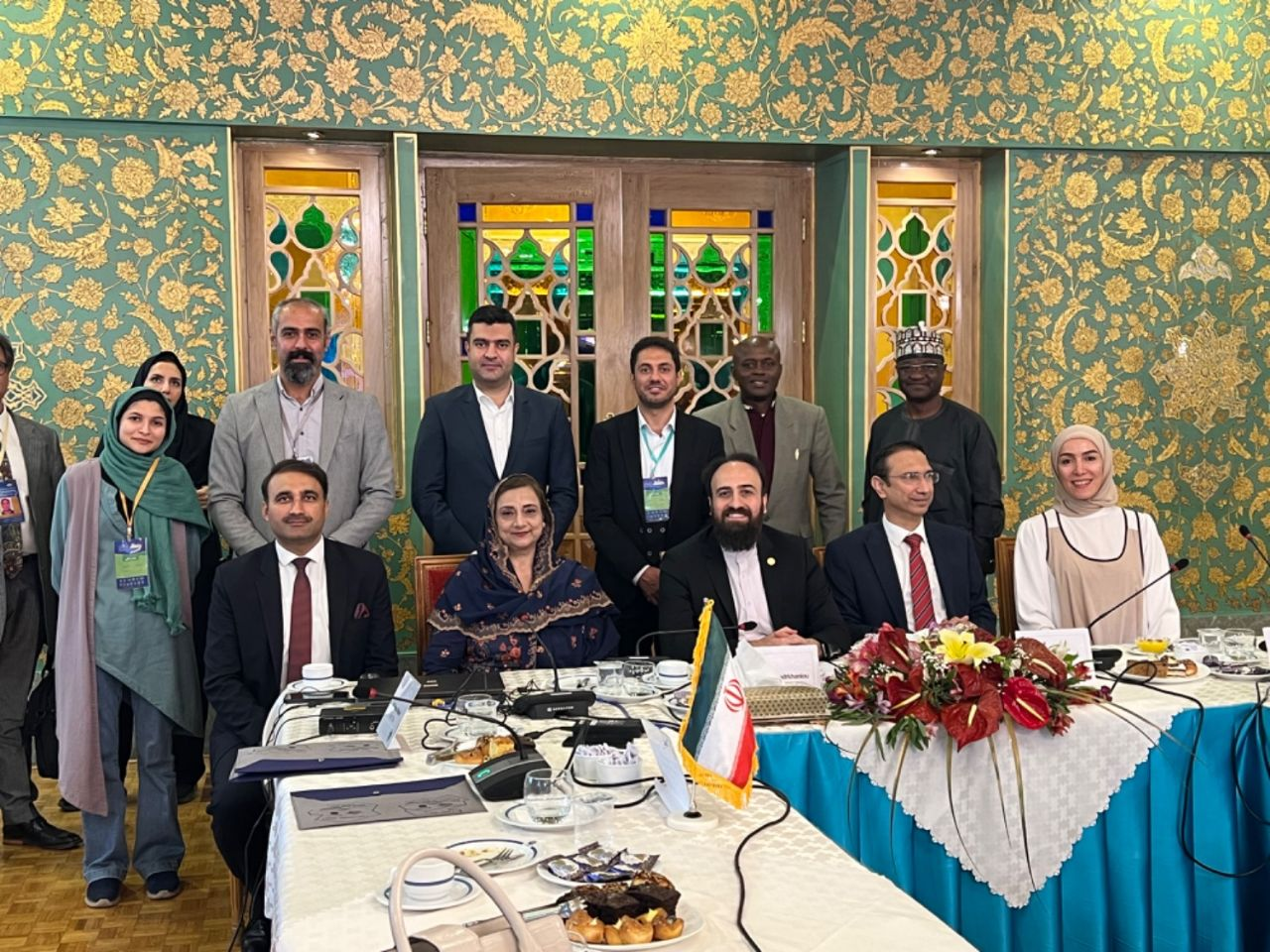
The 8th High Council Meeting (HCM 2023) hosted by Isfahan, Iran.

During these gatherings, the highest-ranking officials of the D-8 TTEN collaborate to synchronize member countries' activities, revise and enhance programs and initiatives, exchange perspectives, brainstorm ideas, outline each country's capabilities and needs, and chart the network's future trajectory while confirming decisions. Ultimately, new proposals are endorsed.

The council comprises esteemed representatives, including the Secretary-General of the D-8 Organization, the Network Secretary (Director of the Park), Bangladesh Council of Scientific and Industrial Research, the Egyptian Academy of Research and Technology, Indonesian National Research and Innovation Agency, Iran National Techmart, the Department of Commercialization and Technology Transfer of the Ministry of Science Malaysia, Nigerian National Office for Technology Acquisition and Promotion, the Engineering Development Board of Pakistan, and the Scientific and Technological Research Council of Turkey. To date, eight HCMs have been held.

== 10th Establishment Anniversary ==
On October 4, 2023, the D-8 Technology Transfer and Exchange Network (D-8 TTEN) celebrated its 10th establishment anniversary ceremony at Pardis Technology Park. The event was attended by representatives of international and regional organizations, including the Indian Ocean Rim Association (IORA), Economic Cooperation Organization (ECO), D-8 Organization for Economic Cooperation, Mustafa Science and Technology Foundation, Standing Committee for Scientific and Technological Cooperation (COMSTECH), among others.

During the anniversary event, Isiaka Abdulqadir Imam, the Secretary General of the D-8 organization, announced the establishment of an international specialized investment fund in the field of technology within the D-8 member countries. He also expressed his appreciation for the excellent hosting provided by Pardis Technology Park for the D-8 TTEN. Furthermore, he highlighted that the creation of a joint technology fund would be one of the key initiatives undertaken during the second decade of this network.

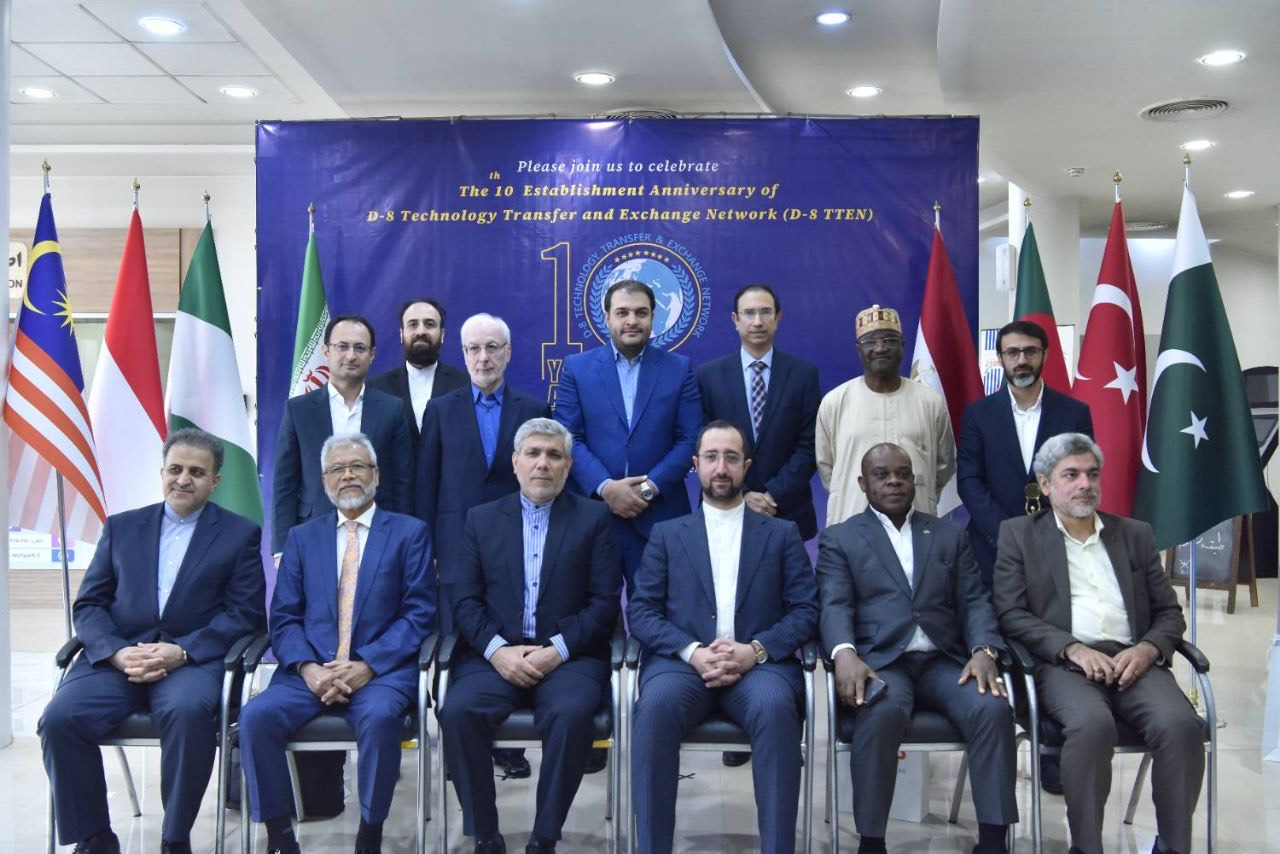
10th establishment anniversary ceremony of D-8 TTEN

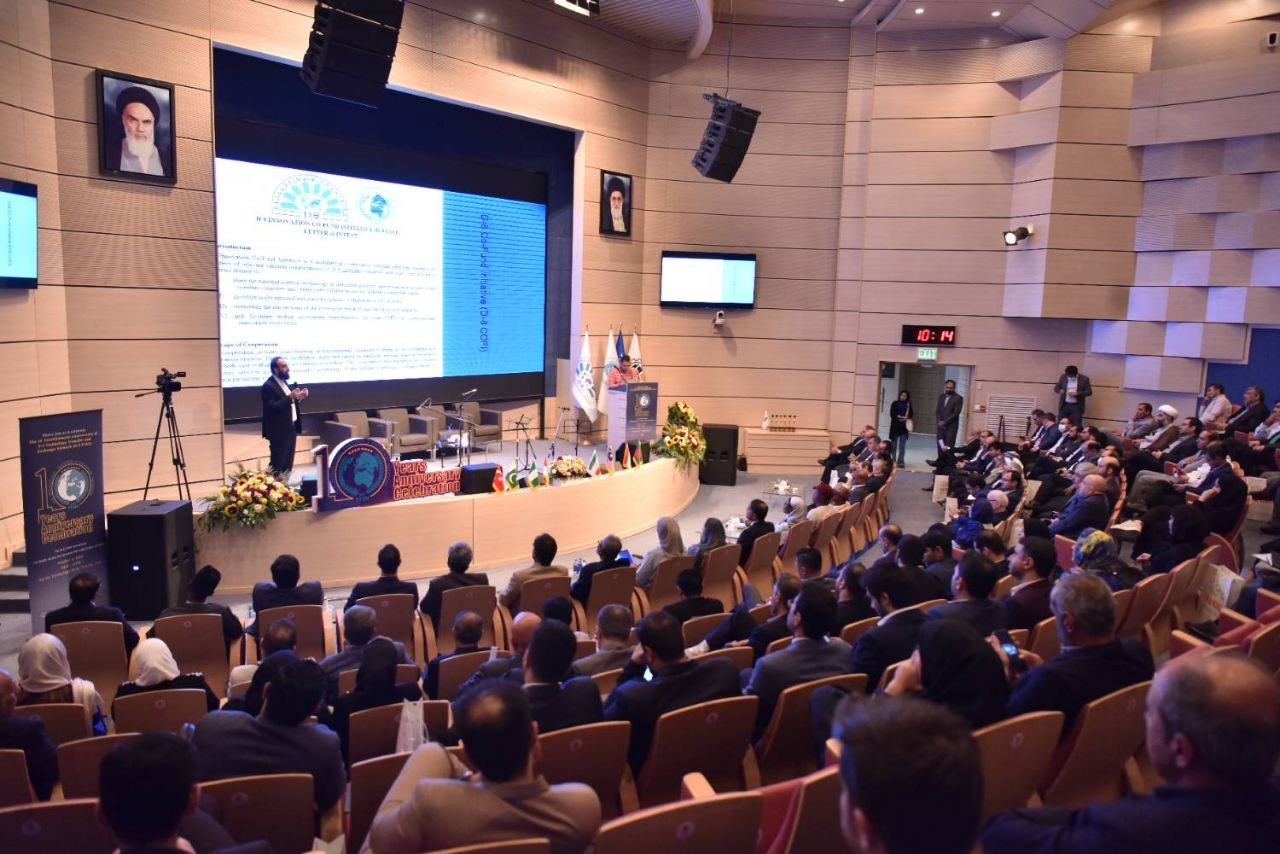
Dr. Sadr-Khanlou explaining the past activities of D-8 TTEN

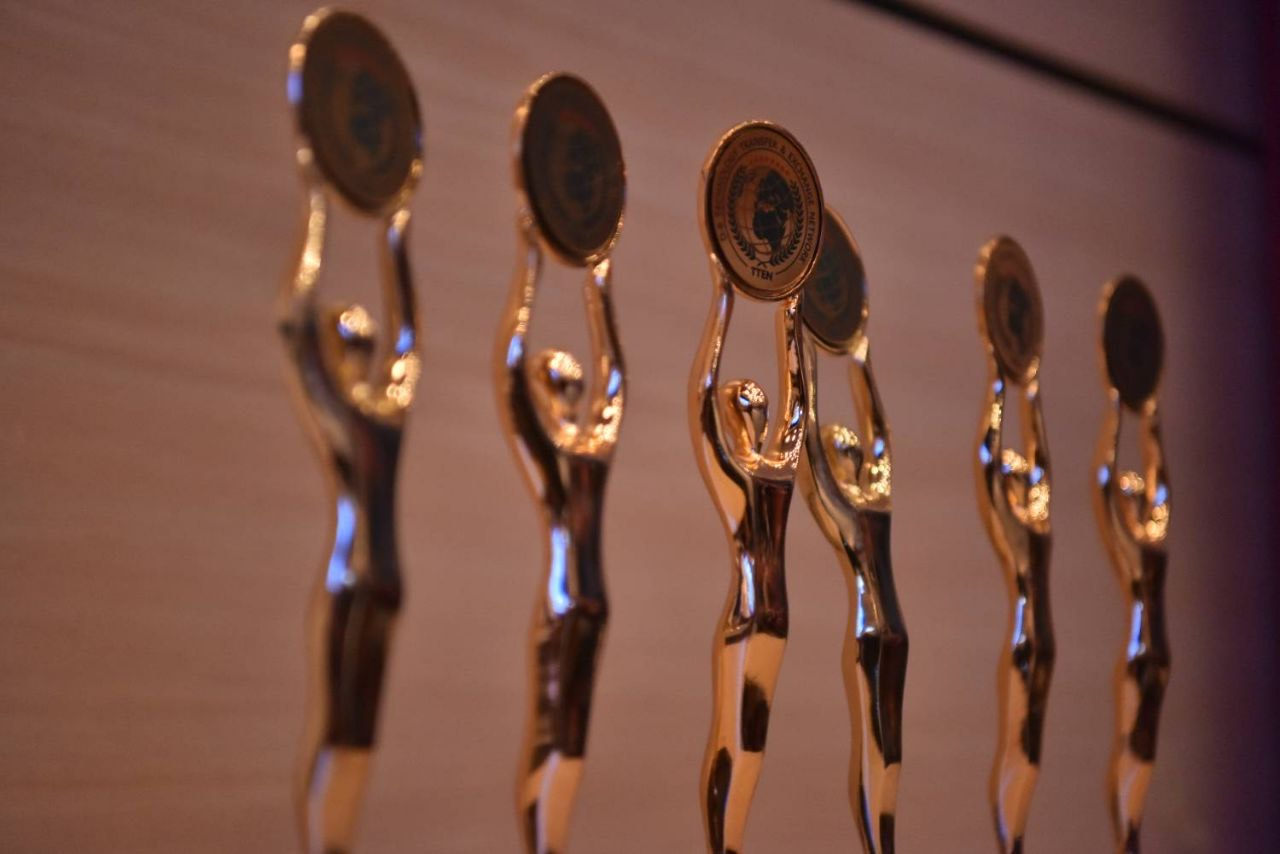
Acknowledgement award of D-8 TTEN

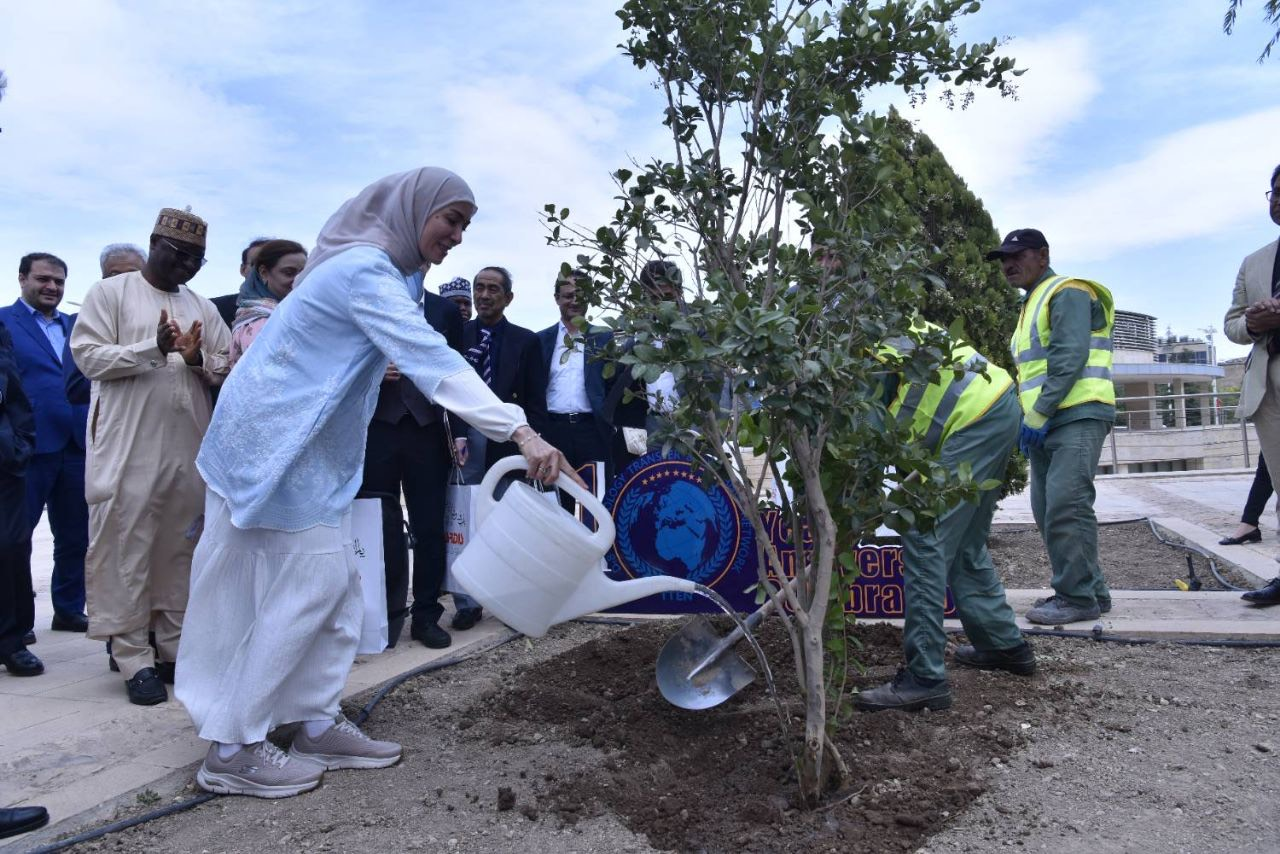
Ceremonial tree planting

== Vision and Mission ==
=== Vision ===
D-8 TTEN's goal is to create a global Islamic platform that promotes innovation and sustainability grounded in Islamic culture, with a particular emphasis on Islamic countries, including those within the D-8 organization.

=== Mission ===
- Identifying specific technology sectors that require attention in each country.
- Establishing a platform for influential individuals within relevant communities to come together and exchange ideas, fostering mutual support for business growth.
- Facilitating the negotiation and formation of agreements between technology companies.
- Establishing a network that unites ventures, investors, business angels, private equity funds, fundraisers, family offices, asset and wealth managers from all countries.

== See also ==
- D-8 Organization for Economic Cooperation
- Organisation of Islamic Cooperation
