= Sadaf Malaterre =

Pakistani fashion designer (born 1969)

- صدف مالاتر
- Born: 3 April 1969; Karachi, Pakistan
- Occupation: Fashion designer
- Label: Sadaf Malaterre (Sadaf Habib)

Sadaf Malaterre (born 3 April 1969) is a French-born fashion designer who has been running her eponymous label in Karachi, Pakistan, since 2005.

== Career ==
She went to Saint Joseph's College for Women, Karachi. In the early part of her career she modeled for brands and fashion magazines in Pakistan. As a designer, she is known for her bright colors and innovative techniques. Malaterre is also known for using local embroidery techniques to create modern textures.
