= Julien Columeau =

French novelist

Julien Columeau (born 13 November 1972 in Valence, France) is a French novelist living in Pakistan, writing in French and Urdu. He settled in Pakistan in 2003 where he has lived since, and lived in India for eight years prior to that.
