= Mehmood Bhatti =

Pakistani French fashion designer (born 1958)

- Born: 1958 (age 67–68); Lahore, Pakistan
- Occupation: Fashion designer

Mehmood Bhatti (born 1958) is a Pakistani-French fashion designer.

== Early life ==
Bhatti was born and grew up in Lahore, Pakistan.

== Career ==
Bhatti immigrated to France in 1976, where he married a French woman and established himself as a fashion designer.

In 1977, he left for Paris to pursue an MBA without having the necessary financial resources. However, he found employment in a retail store, first as a cleaner, then as a packer, before becoming a salesman.

He claims, his fashion brand operates internationally, with boutiques and clients in multiple countries.

== Controversies and legal challenges ==
=== Legal disputes and maintenance suit ===
In March 2025, a maintenance lawsuit was filed in the Lahore Family Court by a woman named Humaira, who identifies herself as Bhatti's fourth wife. According to court documents, she alleges that Bhatti misrepresented his marital history on their marriage certificate, falsely listing only one prior marriage and three children, while records from France reportedly indicated he had divorced three previous wives prior to their marriage. Humaira claims Bhatti exhibited a "cruel demeanor" during their marriage, allegedly evicted her from their home, and has failed to provide financial support, now seeking monthly maintenance of Rs 1 million. She also accused him of emotional and mental abuse, which has drawn considerable public attention and commentary on his personal reputation.

Earlier reports noted that the Lahore Family Court had moved the maintenance case to the proclamation stage, a legal step often indicating non-compliance with court notices, as Bhatti had not appeared for hearings. The proceedings highlighted broader tensions within the family and questions regarding emotional support and financial responsibilities.

=== Documentary scrutiny and public debate ===
In mid-2025, a YouTube documentary titled Designer or Deceiver? Explosive Documentary Exposes Mehmood Bhatti's Web of Lies generated public debate and media discussion. According to the documentary, the film examined alleged inconsistencies between Bhatti's public statements and information presented in his autobiographical writings.

The documentary further reported that in 2002, Bhatti challenged in the Revenue Court the transfer of a parcel of land on Multan Road that he had previously granted to his brother Munir Bhatti under a general power of attorney dated 1987. Bhatti’s autobiography confirms that the land was with his brother and includes theft, document fraud, prostitution rackets in Paris, and fleeing Pakistan in the 1970s to avoid arrest admissions. In that proceeding, the case was decided against Bhatti by the Additional Deputy Commissioner (Revenue). The documentary stated that no further legal challenge was pursued for nearly two decades. It also noted that commentators cited this gap when questioning a subsequent 2021 lawsuit, in which Bhatti claimed he was unaware of the land transfer, arguing that it conflicted with the earlier 2002 decision and raised issues under Pakistan's Limitation Act.

The documentary also examined discrepancies in Bhatti's narrative about his family history. He made varying claims about his family background. In some interviews, he stated that both of his parents died during his childhood, while in his autobiography he described himself as having been adopted. Commentators cited in Pakistani media have pointed to these inconsistencies as part of a broader pattern of conflicting public statements.

The documentary further scrutinised Bhatti's assertions regarding his business interests, notably his purported majority ownership in the National Defence Hospital in Lahore. According to the film and quoted legal documents, Bhatti holds only a minority share that is the subject of ongoing litigation, and hospital officials reportedly denied his administrative role. The documentary claimed that several legal allegations, including an accusation of theft of Rs 130 million, were dismissed by law enforcement and courts for lack of evidence.

Religious and public reactions also emerged following the documentary's release, with several institutions reportedly issuing religious rulings (fatwas) condemning his statements as contrary to Islamic values. The film urged audiences to distinguish between media narratives and legally verified facts.

=== French criminal proceedings ===
In May 2026, Bhatti appeared before the Court of Appeal of Paris and pleaded guilty to tax fraud and aggravated money laundering linked to financial activities between 2009 and 2014.

The Paris Court of Appeal handed Bhatti a two-year suspended prison sentence and imposed a €150,000 fine. The court additionally barred him from managing or operating any company for 10 years.

Investigators found that the tax fraud offences took place between 2009 and 2012, while money laundering was traced across a longer period from 2009 to 2014. Evidence presented in court indicated that Bhatti had used a company registered in the United Arab Emirates to finance his lifestyle through a loan-based financial arrangement. Court records further noted that Bhatti acknowledged the allegations during the appeal process and requested a reduced sentence, and that he had previously been subject to investigation in a separate financial misconduct matter in 2001.

=== Other allegations ===
In a book attributed to Bhatti, Reincarnation of Another Kind, he described episodes from his life in Paris, including claims that he engaged in sex work, provided sexual services in exchange for money, demanded increased payment, and later severed contact with those involved. In the same account, he recounted an incident in which he was allegedly assaulted by a client's spouse, after which he claimed to have resolved not to become involved with married individuals. These passages, which have circulated widely in media coverage, were referenced in the documentary as examples of Bhatti's self-reported past.

In 2025, additional media coverage discussed new allegations related to Bhatti's business dealings and philanthropic claims, challenging the scale and transparency of his philanthropic ventures and property holdings in Pakistan. These reports referenced both the maintenance lawsuit and documentary findings to argue that aspects of Bhatti's public narrative had been debated in both legal and media arenas.

== Awards and recognition ==
On 23 March 2024, Bhatti was awarded the Sitara-i-Imtiaz, Pakistan's third highest award and the highest award given to a civilian.

== In popular culture ==
The popular French comedy film Would I Lie to You? (1997), which would later be followed by other films in the series (released in 2001 and in 2012), was based on the life of Bhatti, especially his beginnings.

== Book ==
Du Paris au Sentier (1999), his autobiography in French that he co-wrote with journalist Alexie Lorca, as of 2020 it had been translated into Urdu as Paris Mein Doosra Janam: Aalami Shohratyafta Fashion Designer Mehmood Bhatti Ki Aap Beeti.
