= Shafqat Baloch =

Pakistani military officer (died 2010)

Saviour of Lahore Shafqat Baloch
- Born: Kot Musa Khan, Sargodha, British India
- Died: 13 August 2010
- Burial place: Kot Musa Khan, Sargodha
- Military career
- Allegiance: Pakistan
- Branch: Pakistan Army
- Rank: Colonel
- Nickname: Defender of Lahore
- Unit: 17 Punjab Regiment
- Commands: 17 Punjab Regiment
- Conflicts: Indo-Pakistani War of 1965; Indo-Pakistani War of 1971
- Awards: 2x Sitara-e-Jurat

Colonel Shafqat Baloch SJ (died 13 August 2010) was a Pakistani military officer who was known as the "Saviour of Lahore" for his actions during the 1965 Indo-Pakistani war. He was awarded the Sitara-e-Jurat twice, first for his service in that conflict and again for his service in the Indo-Pakistani War of 1971.

== Early life ==
Colonel Shafqat Baloch was born in Sargodha, Punjab, to a Baloch family. His native village was Kot Musa Khan, located on the outskirts of Sargodha.

== Military career ==
=== 1965 Indo-Pakistani War - The Battle of Hudaira ===
The 1965 Indo-Pakistani war ended in a ceasefire. As a result, people from both countries have provided different accounts of the events that took place during the war. The battle of Hudaira is one such example of differing views.

On 6 September 1965, at 1:00 A.M., Major Shafqat Baloch was moving towards his assigned position with 90 troops from the 17th Punjab Regiment. The troops were moving cautiously due to reports of Indian incursions in the area. Suddenly, they heard a machine gun fired from a Pakistan Rangers military post. Baloch ordered his troops to move toward the post, where they met a ranger who reported an Indian assault, the overrunning of Gwanti post, and the deaths of many unit members, including the major in command. The ranger was supposed to inform the higher command, but the telephone line was damaged. Major Baloch ordered the troops to entrench near the Ichhogil Canal on the outskirts of Hudaira village.

Major Baloch directed artillery fire precisely at the Indian troops, inflicting heavy casualties as they were unaware of the Pakistani presence. Then, Pakistani anti-tank crews destroyed two Indian tanks, followed by infantry assault. The Indians retreated.

Major Baloch's actions stalled the front for 17 days until a ceasefire agreement was reached. He was awarded the Sitara-e-Jurat for his bravery.

Lieutenant General Harbakhsh Singh stated in his account of the battle that, as the General Officer (Commanding) (GOC) of the 7th Infantry Division tasked with capturing the Bambawali-Ravi-Bedian Canal (BRB Canal), Major Baloch's account of the casualties was accurate. After the ceasefire, new information revealed that the Indians had suffered approximately 400 deaths. Later, Major Baloch was ordered by his superiors to settle the ceasefire line. According to the Pakistani newspaper 'The International News', Major Baloch crossed the BRB Canal and reached the Indian positions, where Major Puri, an infantry commander, and Major Hira Singh, an armor commander, congratulated him for his resistance. The ceasefire conditions were accepted without arguments.

Baloch was promoted to lieutenant colonel and briefly served in the 1971 war in East Pakistan but was removed from service there. He was then promoted to colonel and received his second Sitara-e-Jurat.

He died of a heart attack on 13 August 2010 at Combined Military Hospital Rawalpindi (CMH Rawalpindi) and was buried in Machhar Khadi, Sargodha.

== In popular culture ==
He was portrayed by Asad Malik in the 2016 film Saya e Khuda e Zuljalal.
