= Pakistanis in France =

Ethnic population in a given country

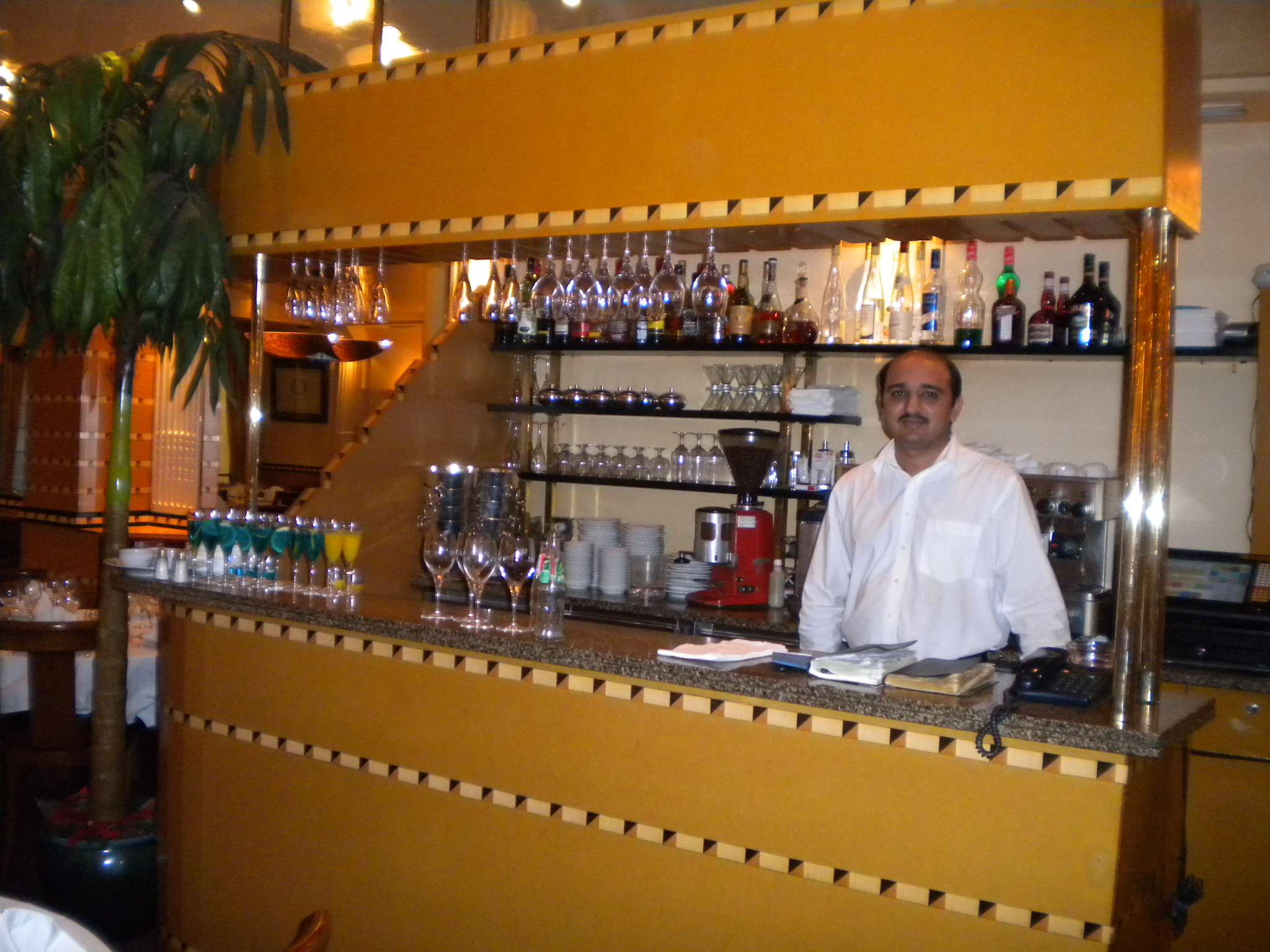

Total population
- 21,000 - 120,000 (estimate) in Overseas DOM-TOM Réunion, French Guiana, Guadeloupe, Martinique

Regions with significant populations
- DOM-TOM

Religion
- Islam

Related ethnic groups
- Overseas Pakistanis

Pakistanis in France, primarily of Punjabi origin from Punjab and Azad Kashmir. Large-scale Pakistani migration to France began in the 1970s; they clustered around the Rue du Faubourg-Saint-Denis in the 10th arrondissement of Paris, where many set up grocery stores and restaurants.

According to the latest figures published by the Ministry of Overseas Pakistanis, there were an estimated 104,000 Pakistanis living in France as of the year 2017.

According to the latest official statistics published by the French government, there were 24,305 Pakistani-born people living in the country in the year 2015, also there were 19,646 Pakistani nationals living in France in 2015.

Air France previously served Karachi airport until the mid-1990s and there is now demand for a return, especially given the comparable cities in North Africa more continuously served by this premium carrier.

Most Pakistanis in France are concentrated in the major cities such as Paris, Lyon, Marseille, Lille, and Toulouse. They have settled in France for various reasons, including education, work opportunities, family reunification, and political asylum.

Education is a significant reason for Pakistani immigration to France. Many Pakistani students come to France to pursue higher education in fields like engineering, computer science, medicine, and business. They often enroll in prestigious French universities and institutions like the École Polytechnique, Sciences Po, and HEC Paris.

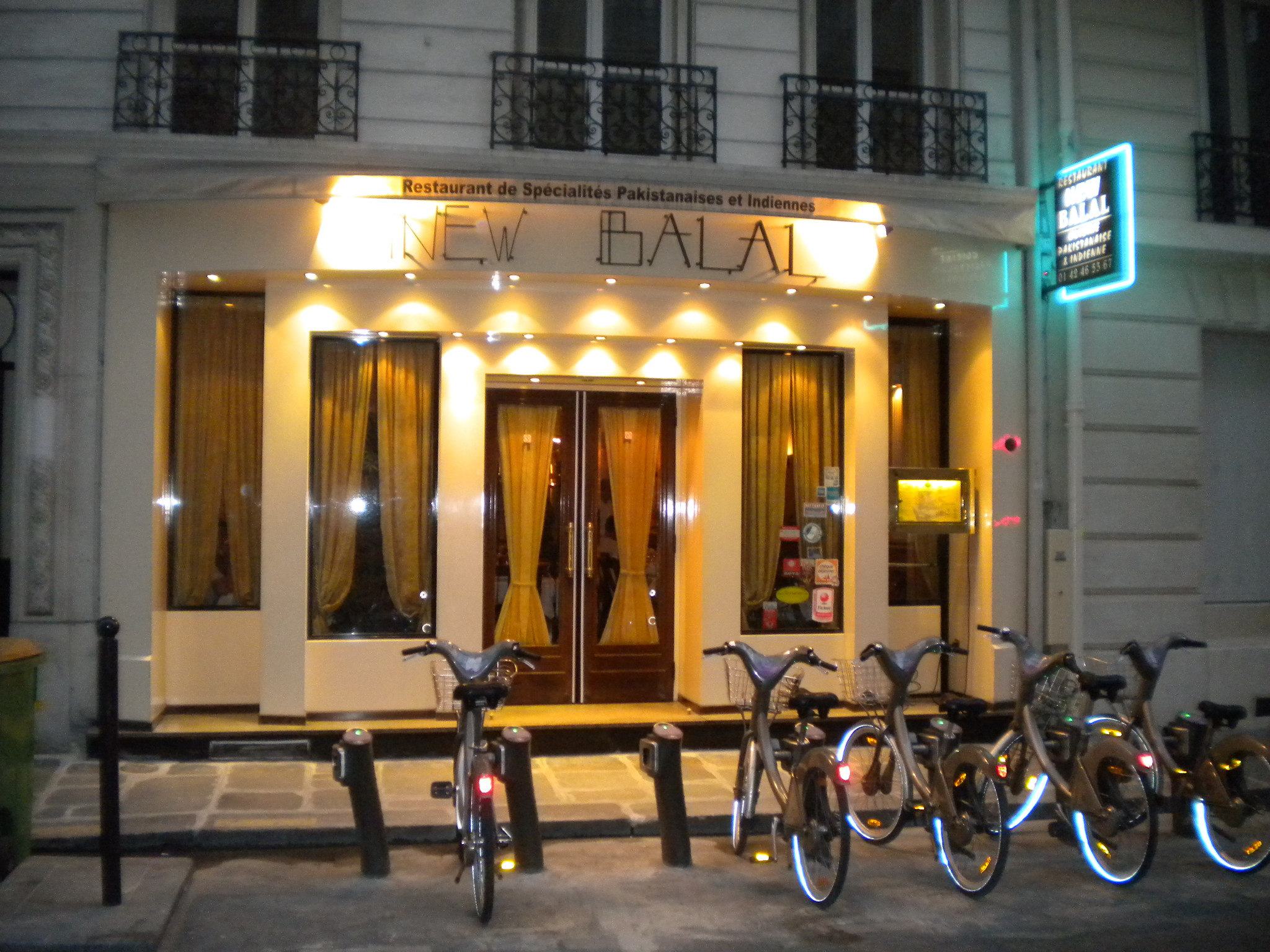
Pakistani Restaurant in Paris

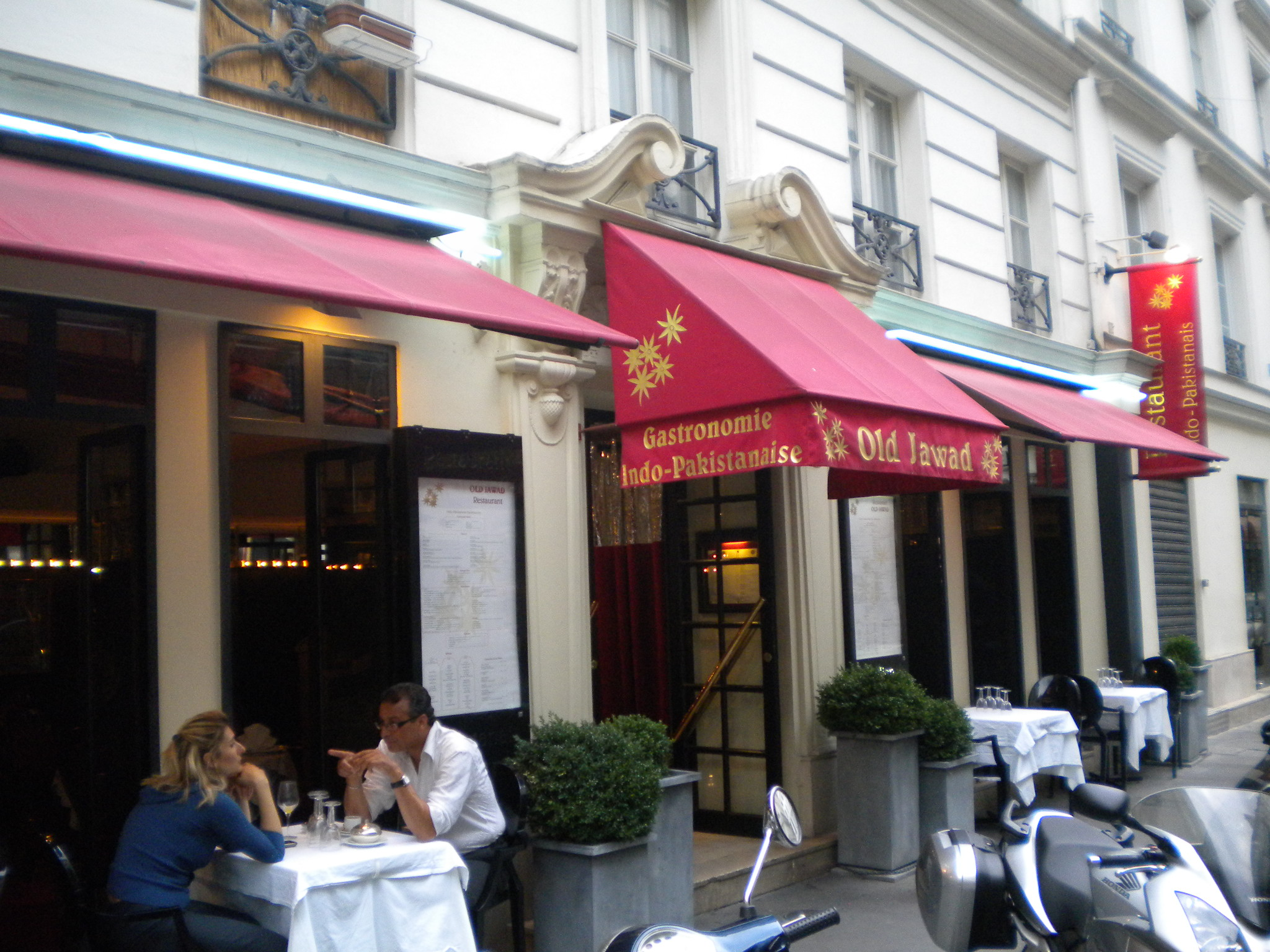
Pakistani Restaurant in Paris

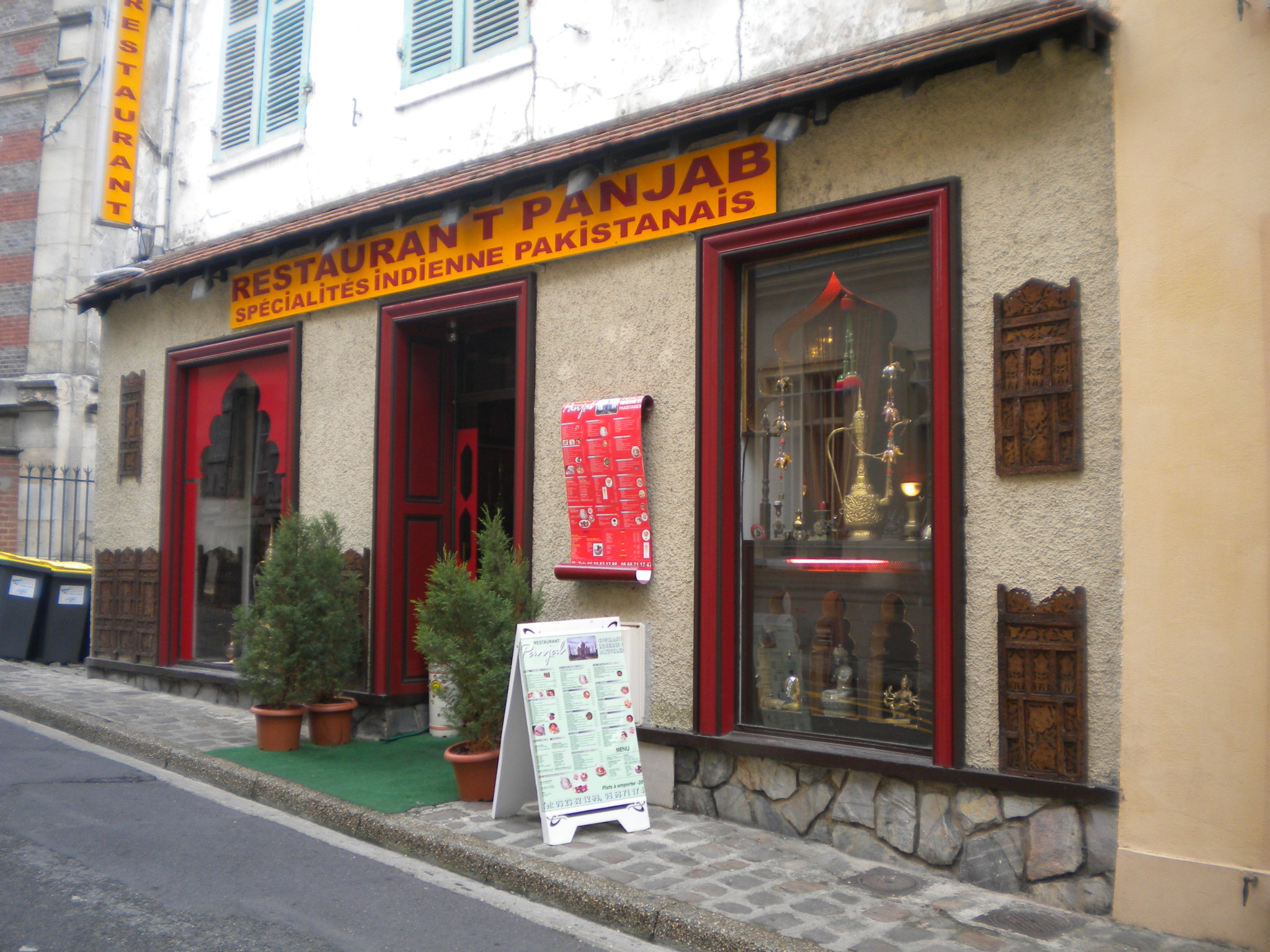
Panjab Restaurant in Chateau Thierry

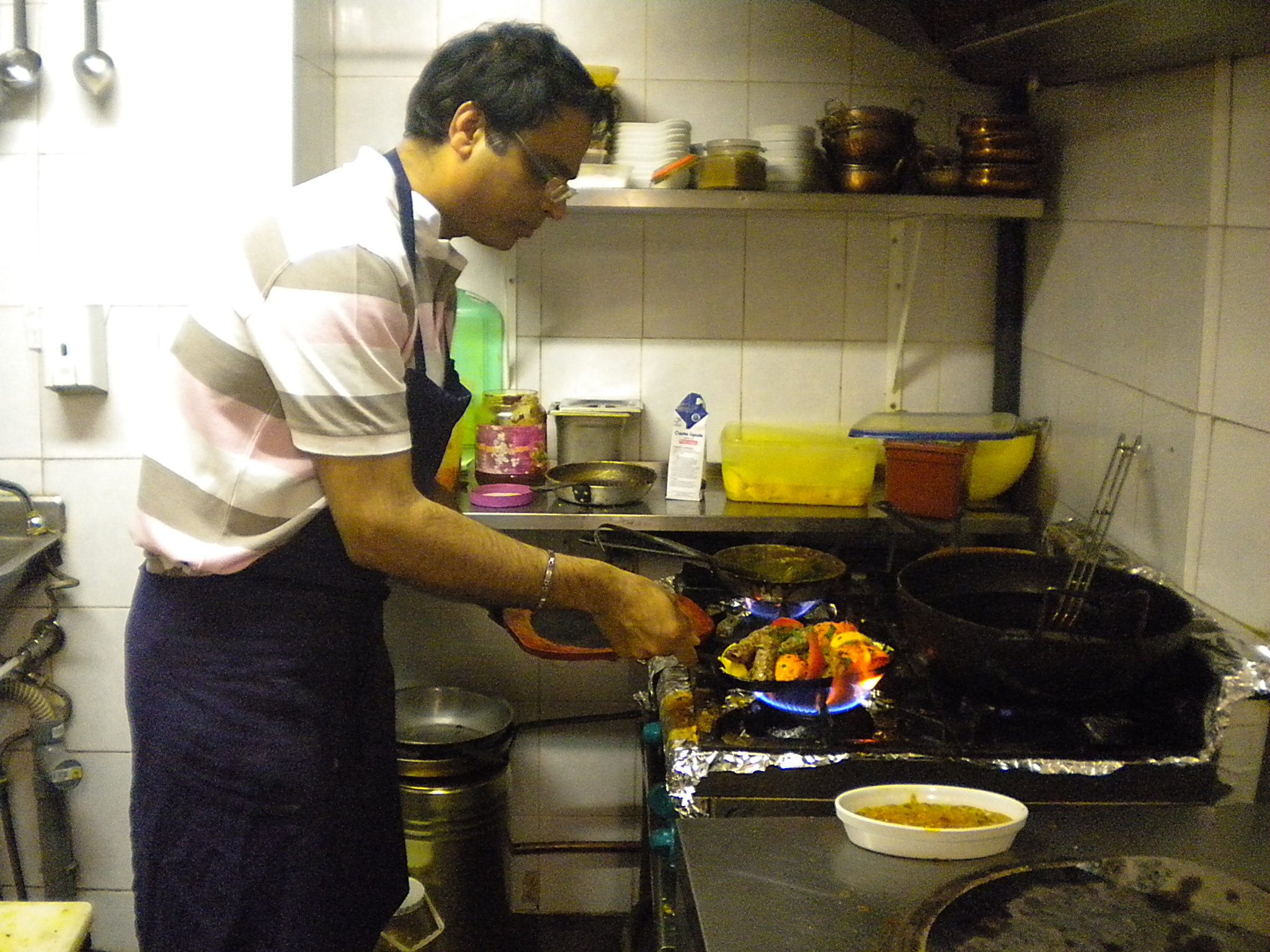
A Punjabi Chef de cuisine in Paris

== Notable people ==
- Mehmood Bhatti, fashion designer and entrepreneur, settled in Paris in 1977
- Namira Salim, Pakistani-born astronaut now based in Paris and Dubai
- Prince Sadruddin Aga Khan, French-born son of Ismaili imam Aga Khan III
- James Caan, British Pakistani entrepreneur who lives in France during part of the year

== See also ==
- France–Pakistan relations
- Pakistani diaspora
- Immigration to France
- French people in Pakistan
- Afghans in France
- Arabs in France
- Iranians in France
