= D-8 Organization for Economic Cooperation =

Group of Muslim-majority Countries

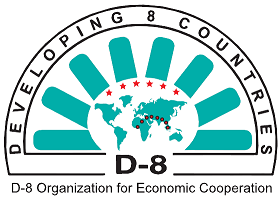

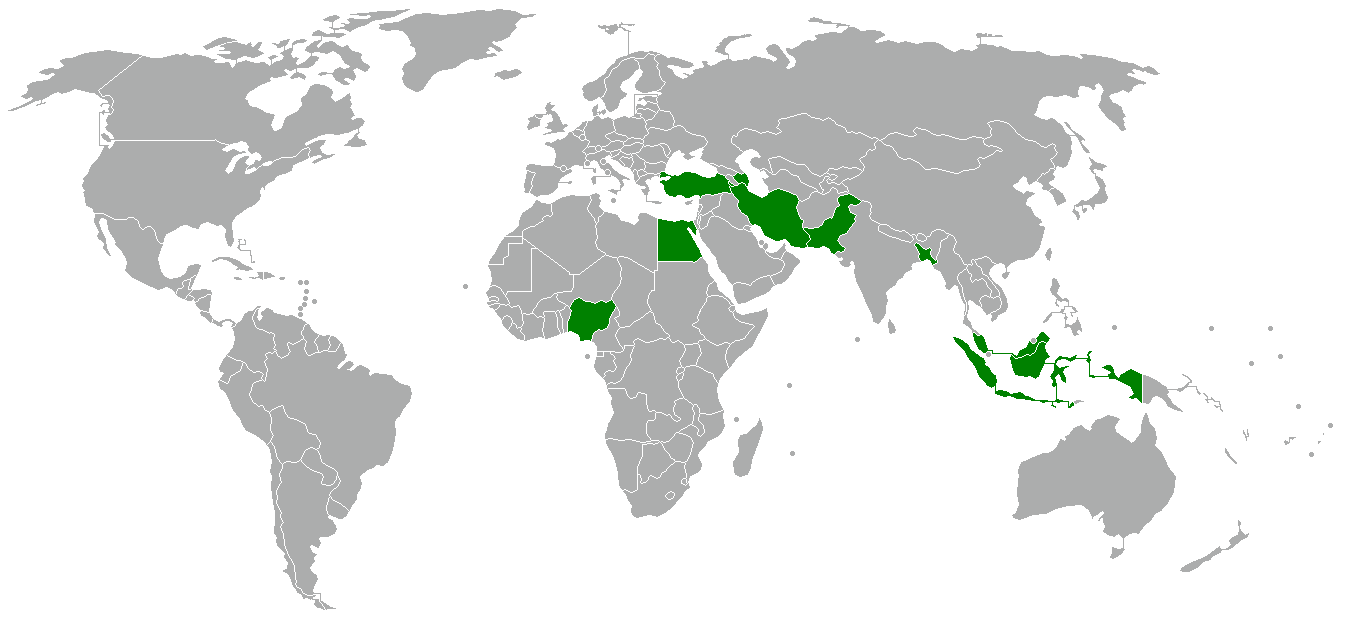
- Members of D-8
- Formation: 1996; 1997 (1 Summit)
- Legal status: Intergovernmental organization
- Headquarters: Istanbul, Turkey
- Members: 9: Azerbaijan Bangladesh Egypt Indonesia Iran Malaysia Nigeria Pakistan Turkey
- Secretary-General: Sohail Mahmood
- President: Badr Abdul Ati
- Chairman: Prabowo Subianto
- Website: www.developing8.org

The D-8 Organization for Economic Cooperation, also known as Developing-8, is an organisation for development co-operation among Bangladesh, Egypt, Indonesia, Iran, Malaysia, Nigeria, Pakistan, and Turkey. Azerbaijan was admitted to the organization as the 9th member on 19 December 2024.

The combined population of the eight countries is about 1.2 billion or 60% of all Muslims, or close to 13% of the world's population and covering an area of 7.6 million square kilometers, 5% of world land area. In 2006, trade between the D-8 member states stood at $35 billion, and it was around $68 billion in 2010. Transactions between the eight developing countries accounted for 3.3 percent of world trade in 2010. The total nominal GDP of the eight nations was around 4.92 trillion as of 2023.

== Purposes and objectives ==
The main areas of co-operation include finance, banking, rural development, science and technology, humanitarian development, agriculture, energy, environment, and health.

In the first Summit Declaration (Istanbul, 1997), the main objective of D-8 is stated to be socio-economic development in accordance with the following principles:

- Peace instead of conflict.
- Dialogue instead of confrontation.
- Cooperation instead of exploitation.
- Justice instead of double standard.
- Equality instead of discrimination.
- Democracy instead of oppression.

The fifth D-8 Summit Declaration (Bali, 2006) produced the following, as illustration of the application of the group's objectives:

- Commitment to work together to solve the problem of economic disparities within our countries.
- Reaffirm commitment to enhance co-operation in the field of energy to develop alternative and renewable energy resources.
- Emphasize the importance of D-8 in contributing to the economic development of its member countries and ensure that it promotes global trade.

== Structure ==
The Summit, which is convened every two years, has the highest level of authority, and is composed of the leaders of each member state.

The Council is the principal decision-making body and forum for consideration of issues relating to the and is composed of the foreign affairs ministers of each member state.

The Commission has executive authority, and is composed of Commissioners appointed by each member state's government. Commissioners are responsible for promoting compliance with directives in their respective nation. Finally, an executive director is appointed by D-8 members to facilitate communication and to act in a supervisory capacity during each summit or lower-level assembly.

== Cooperation between ISC and the D-8 Organization ==
The Islamic World Science and Technology Citation and Monitoring Institute (ISC) and the D-8 Organization for Economic Cooperation signed a memorandum of understanding on 13 February 2023 at the D-8 Secretariat in Istanbul, Turkey. The agreement aimed to strengthen cooperation in the fields of scientometrics, technology, and innovation. It was signed on behalf of the two institutions by Ambassador Isiaka Abdulqadir Imam, Secretary-General of the D-8 Organization, and Professor Seyed Ahmad Fazelzadeh, Head of ISC.

The memorandum aims to strengthen cooperation among scientists and research institutions in member states, improve the performance of research institutions, develop platforms for scientific collaboration, and implement joint activities to enhance engagement and visibility between the two organizations. The agreement also emphasizes expanding cooperation in scientometrics, technology, and innovation, as well as developing effective science and technology policies in member states.

According to the D-8 Organization, the 2023 memorandum replaced two previous memoranda of understanding signed between the two institutions in 2012 and 2018.

== D-8 Summits ==
	Date	Host country	Host leader	Location held
1	June 1997	Turkey	Necmettin Erbakan	Istanbul
2	March 1999	Bangladesh	Sheikh Hasina	Dhaka
3	February 2001	Egypt	Hosni Mubarak	Cairo
4	February 2004	Iran	Mohammad Khatami	Tehran
5	May 2006	Indonesia	Susilo Bambang Yudhoyono	Bali
6	July 2008	Malaysia	Abdullah Ahmad Badawi	Kuala Lumpur
7	July 2010	Nigeria	Muhammadu Buhari	Abuja
8	November 2012	Pakistan	Asif Ali Zardari	Islamabad
9	October 2017	Turkey	Recep Tayyip Erdoğan	Istanbul
10	April 2021	Bangladesh	Sheikh Hasina	Virtual
11	18-20 December 2024	Egypt	Abdel Fattah el-Sisi	Cairo
12	2026-2027	Indonesia		

== Member countries ==
Country	Population (2024)	Nominal GDP (USD million) 2025	Nominal GDP per capita ($) 2025	PPP GDP (USD million) 2025	PPP GDP per capita ($) 2025	Life expectancy (years, avg. 2024)	HDI (2022)
Azerbaijan	10,353,296	79.506	7,491	211.935	19,968	73.5	0.760 (high)
Bangladesh	173,562,364	565.290	3,083	2,365.200	12,560	75.6	0.705 (high)
Egypt	116,538,258	429.600	4,025	2,781.862	18,838	72.8	0.728 (high)
Indonesia	283,487,931	1,631.609	5,776	5,052.724	17,889	72.5	0.713 (high)
Iran	91,567,738	405.547	4,594	1,835.036	20,785	77.8	0.780 (high)
Malaysia	35,557,673	520.313	15,212	1,398.504	40,885	75.2	0.807 (very high)
Nigeria	232,679,478	625.355	2,679	1,516.404	6,498	62.6	0.548 (low)
Pakistan	251,269,164	452,189	1,910	2,182.034	8,408	68.7	0.560 (low)
Turkey	87,473,805	1,746.192	21,997	4,270.670	51,024	78.4	0.855 (very high)
Average	142,498,856	586,525	6,204	2,042,409	20,075	72.0	0.705 (high)
Combined	1,282,489,707	5,278,725	N/A	18,381,679	N/A	N/A	N/A

== Secretaries-General ==
The Secretary General of the D-8 Organization for Economic Cooperation serves as the chief executive of the Secretariat. The Secretary General is appointed by the Summit, upon the recommendation of the Council of Ministers, by consensus from among qualified candidates nominated by Member States, for a single non-renewable term of four years, in accordance with Article 9.3 of the D-8 Charter and the principle of rotation among Member Countries.

No.	Name	Country of origin	Took office	Left office
1	Ayhan Kamel	Turkey	1997	2006
2	Dipo Alam	Indonesia	2006	2010
3	Widi Agoes Pratikto	Indonesia	2010	2012
4	Seyed Ali Mohammad Mousavi	Iran	2013	2017
5	Ku Jaafar Ku Shaari	Malaysia	2018	2021
6	Isiaka Abdulqadir Imam	Nigeria	2022	2025
7	Sohail Mahmood	Pakistan	2026	present

== Affiliated Bodies ==
- D-8 International University
- D-8 Map of Scientific Excellence and Collaboration (D8-MSEC)
- D-8 Network of Pioneers for Research and Innovation (D-8 NPRI)
- D-8 Technology Transfer and Exchange Network (D-8 TTEN)
- D-8 Health and Social Protection Programme (D-8 HSP)
- D-8 Research Center for Agriculture and Food Security

== See also ==
- Newly industrialized country
- Next Eleven
- Iran-Bangladesh Chamber of Commerce & Industry Joint Chamber of iran, Bangladesh (D-8)
