= Mahmood Shafqat =

Pakistani diplomat

Chairman of UNICEF
- In office 1957–1958
- Preceded by: Balachandra Rajan
- Succeeded by: John Ryan

Mahmood Shafqat (also spelled Mahmoud Shafqat) was a Pakistani diplomat. He was Chairman of UNICEF from 1957 to 1958.

He worked at the Permanent Mission of Pakistan to the United Nations in New York during the 1950s and 1960s, including as Alternate Permanent Representative. He later was Pakistan's Ambassador to Algeria, Poland and France from 1974. He was Pakistan's permanent delegate to UNESCO from 1974 to 1976.
