= High Commission of Pakistan, New Delhi =

Diplomatic mission of Pakistan in India

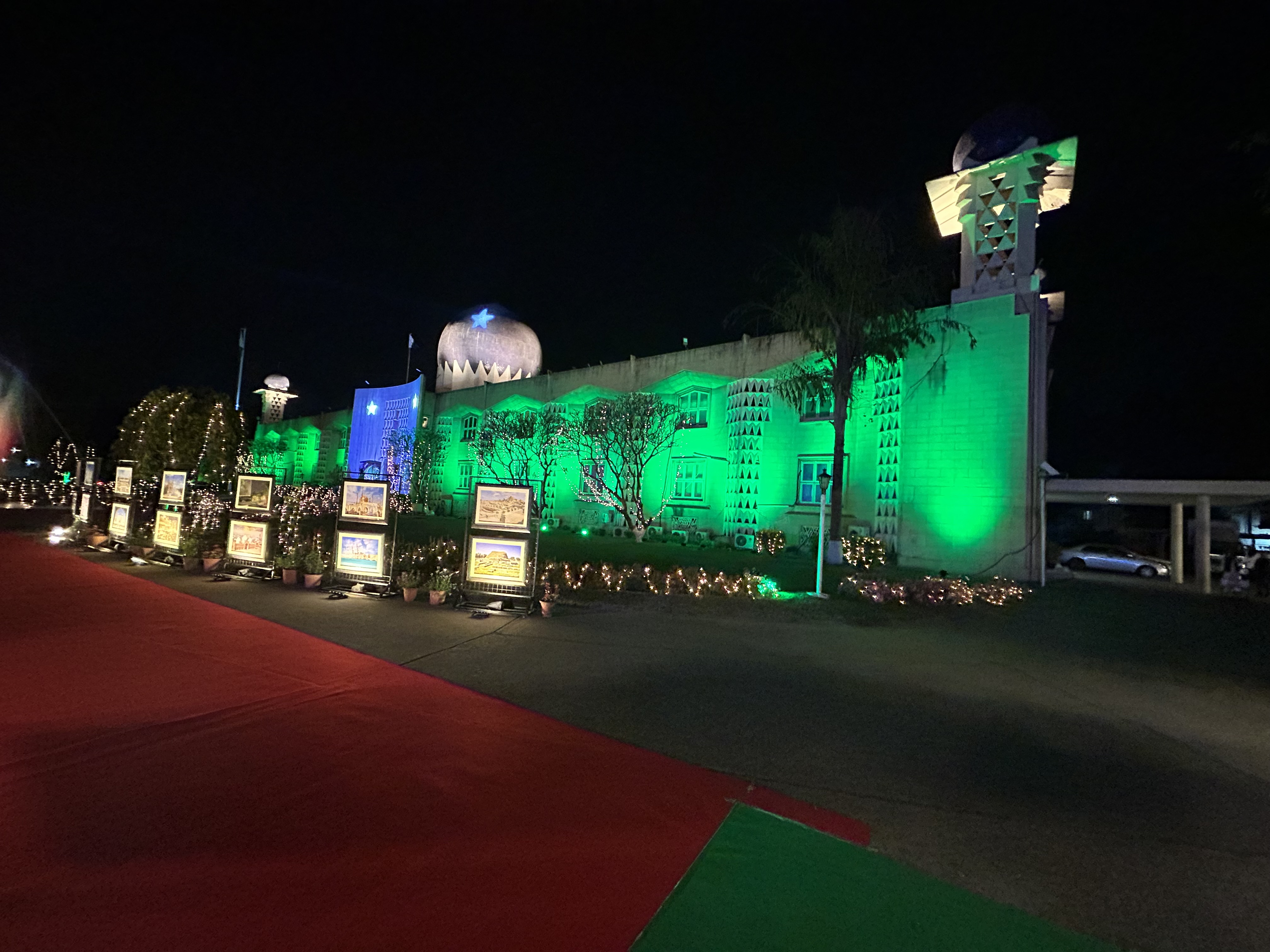
- Location: New Delhi, India
- Address: 50-G, Shantipath, Chanakyapuri, New Delhi, Delhi 110021
- Coordinates: 28.5941°N 77.1904°E
- Jurisdiction: India
- High Commissioner: Saad Ahmad Warraich (Charge d'Affaires)
- Website: Official website

The High Commission of the Islamic Republic of Pakistan in New Delhi is the diplomatic mission of Pakistan in India. Between 1972 and 1989, the mission was known as the Embassy of Pakistan in New Delhi, as Pakistan was then temporarily a republic outside the Commonwealth of Nations, an intergovernmental organization primarily comprising former territories of the British Empire (see British India).

== Location ==
The Pakistani High Commission is located at No. 2/50-G, Shantipath, Chanakyapuri, New Delhi, National Capital Territory of Delhi.

== History ==
The building was built in the 1950s, when Delhi's Diplomatic Enclave was constructed. Previously, Pakistan's High Commission was located close to Delhi's Old Fort, inside the complex of what is now the High Court of Delhi, earlier army barracks. A proposal was made before independence for the High Commission to be located at Red Fort, but this was summarily rejected by the Indian Government.

The High Commissioner's residence on 8-A Hardinge Avenue, now Tilak Marg, was originally the residence of Liaquat Ali Khan, Pakistan's first Prime Minister, who named it 'Gul-i-Ra'ana' after his wife, Ra'ana Liaquat Ali Khan. Following independence, Liaquat gifted the palatial residence to the Pakistani State, whereupon it became the residence of Pakistan's High Commissioner in India.

The building has distinctive Islamic architectural features, such as minarets and a blue dome. As of 2016, there were 98 personnel working at the mission.

=== Attack ===
On 7 August 2013, members of the youth wing of the Indian National Congress (known as the Indian Youth Congress) attacked the Pakistani High Commission in response to news reports of the deaths of five Indian Army soldiers, who were killed the day before in a cross-border firefight with the Pakistan Army during the 2013 India–Pakistan border skirmishes at the Line of Control in the disputed region of Jammu and Kashmir.

The protesters turned violent as they pushed back police barricades and engaged in scuffles with local law enforcement. The Delhi Police resorted to using water cannons to disperse the crowd. Around 175 people were detained, but later released. Similar protests were also organized in other major urban centres throughout India, including in the cities of Mumbai and Hyderabad.

== See also ==
- List of diplomatic missions of Pakistan
- List of diplomatic missions in India
- List of high commissioners of India to Pakistan
- India–Pakistan relations
