= United Kingdom–United States relations =

Bilateral relations

- United Kingdom: United States

Diplomatic mission
- British Embassy, Washington, D.C.: United States Embassy, London

Envoy
- Ambassador Christian Turner: Ambassador; Warren Stephens

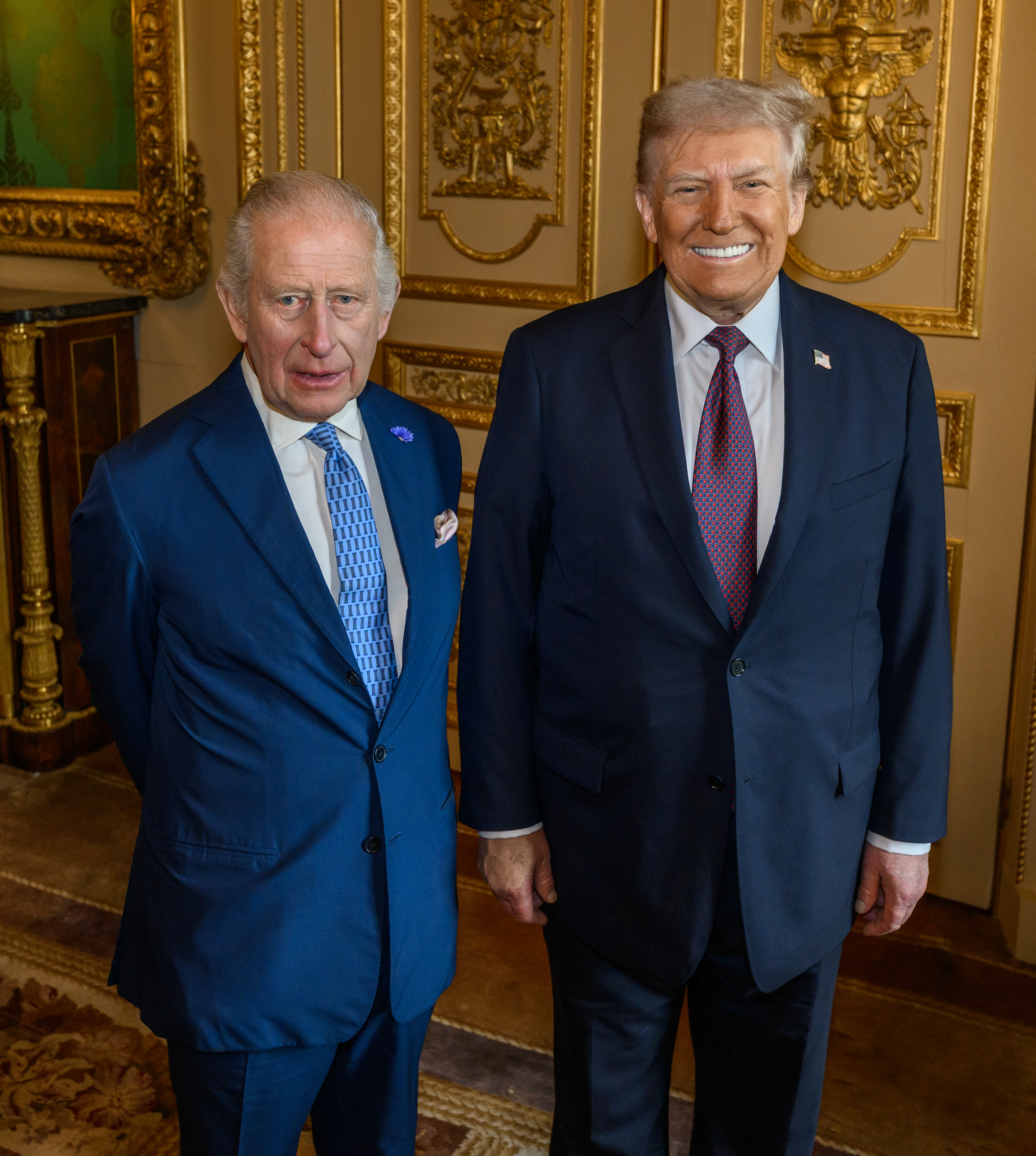
King Charles III and President Donald Trump at Windsor Castle in September 2025

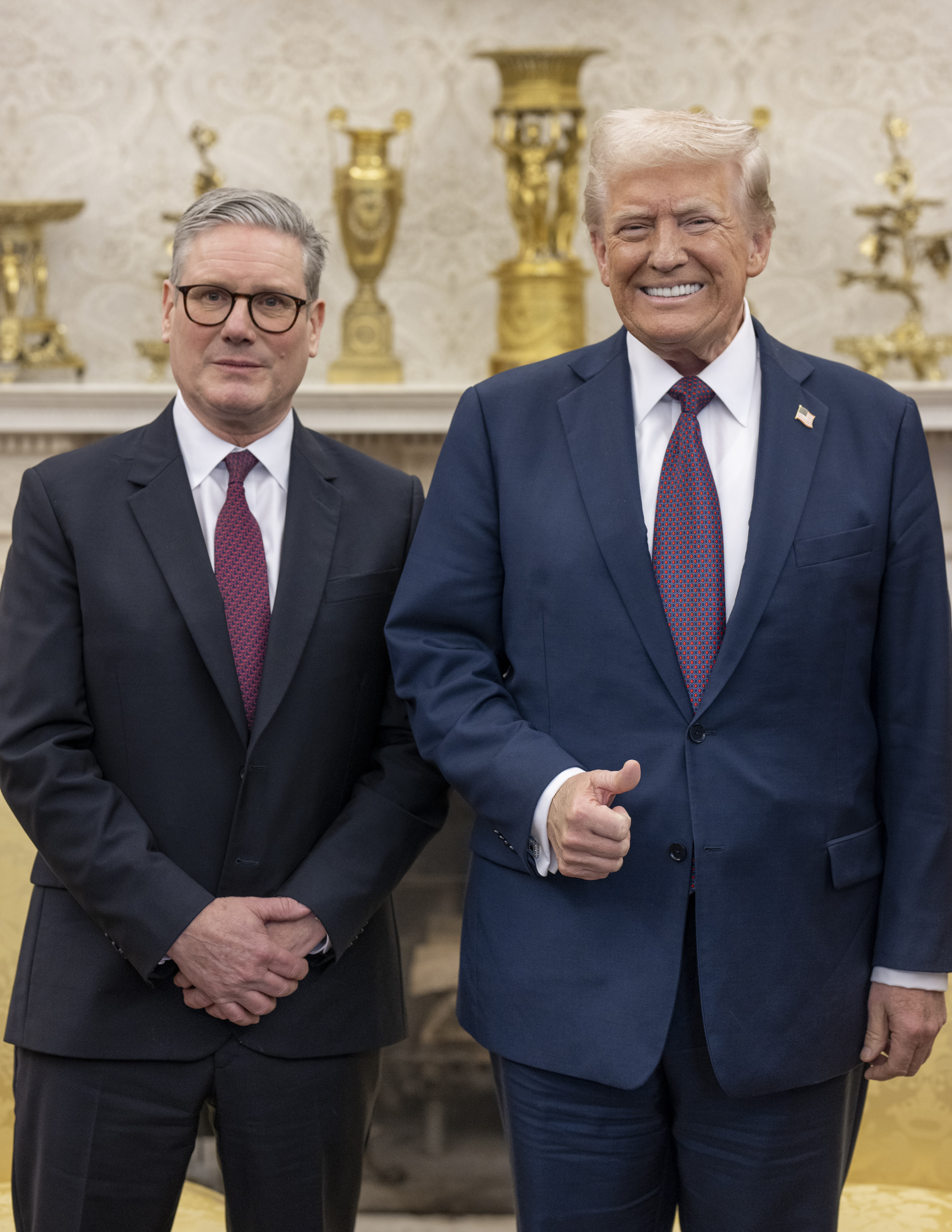
Prime Minister Keir Starmer with President Donald Trump at the White House in February 2025

Since 1776, relations between the United Kingdom and the United States have ranged from military opposition to close allyship. The Thirteen Colonies seceded from the Kingdom of Great Britain and declared independence in 1776, fighting a successful revolutionary war. While Britain was fighting Napoleon, the two nations fought the stalemated War of 1812. Relations were generally positive thereafter, save for a short crisis in 1861 during the American Civil War. In the 1920s, New York City surpassed London as the world's leading financial center. The two nations fought Germany together during the two world wars; since 1940, the two countries have been close military allies, enjoying the "Special Relationship" built as wartime allies and NATO and G7 partners. America and Britain are bound together by a shared history, a common language, an overlap in religious beliefs and legal principles, and kinship ties that reach back hundreds of years. In the 21st century, the United Kingdom and United States have closely coordinated on foreign policy, launching joint military invasions of Afghanistan in 2001 and Iraq in 2003 and leading the 2011 NATO-led intervention in Libya.

In the early 21st century, Britain affirmed its relationship with the United States as its "most important bilateral partnership" in current British foreign policy, and the American foreign policy affirms its relationship with Britain as its second most important relationship, behind only Canada. as evidenced in aligned political affairs, cooperation in the areas of trade, commerce, finance, technology, academics, as well as the arts and sciences; the sharing of government and military intelligence, and joint combat operations and peacekeeping missions carried out between the United States Armed Forces and the British Armed Forces. As of January 2015, the United Kingdom was the fifth largest US trading partner in terms of exports and seventh in terms of imports of goods. In long-term perspective, the historian Paul Johnson has called the United Kingdom–United States relations "the cornerstone of the modern, liberal democratic world order". The two countries have also had a significant impact on the cultures of many other countries, as well as each other. They are the two main nodes of the Anglosphere, with a combined population of just under 400 million in 2019. Together, they have given the English language a dominant lingua franca role in many aspects of the modern world.

== Special Relationship ==
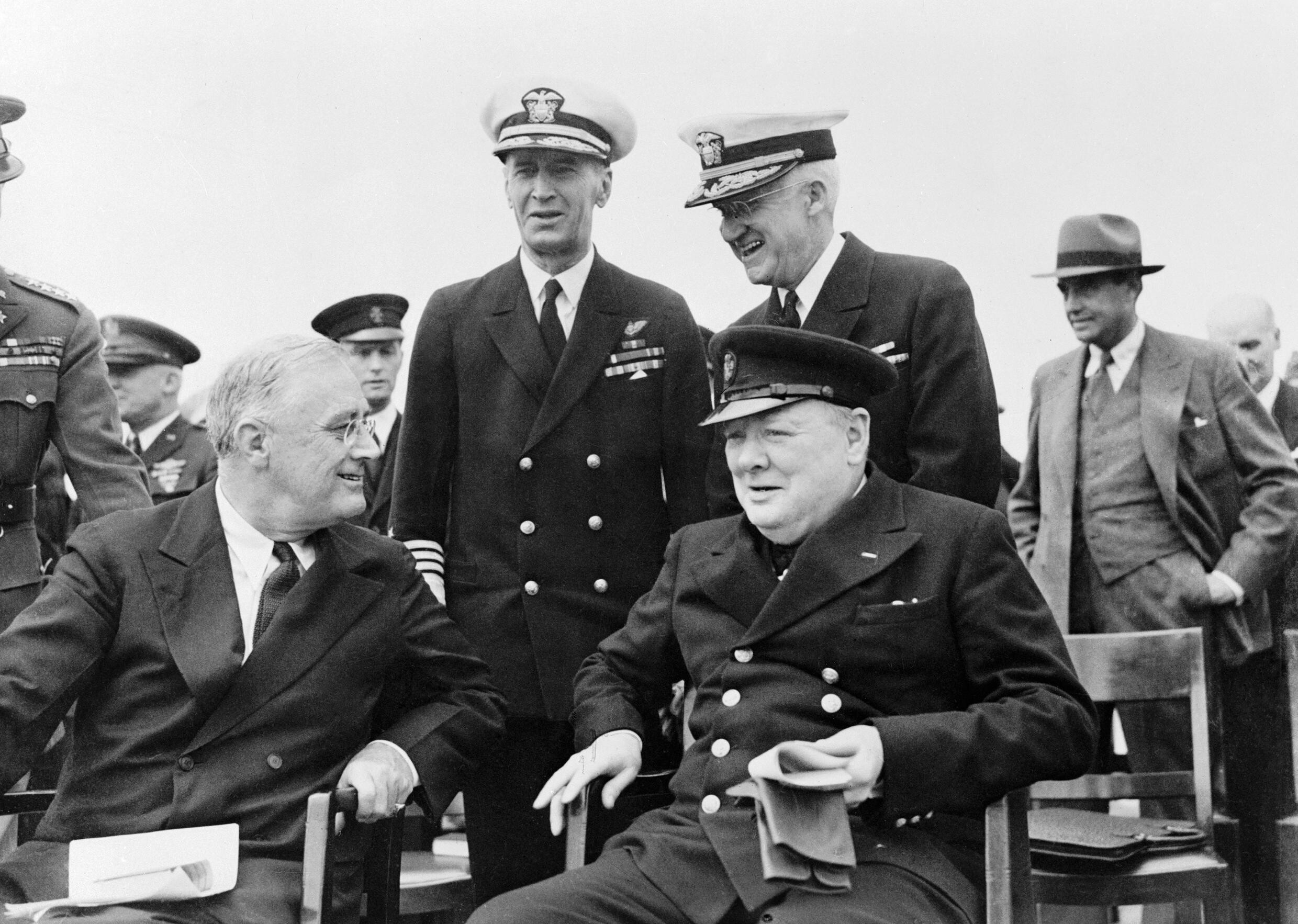
UK Prime Minister Winston Churchill and US President Franklin Roosevelt at Atlantic Conference, August 1941

The Special Relationship characterises the exceptionally close political, diplomatic, cultural, economic, military, and historical relations between the two countries. It has been specially used for relations since 1940.

== History ==
=== Origins ===
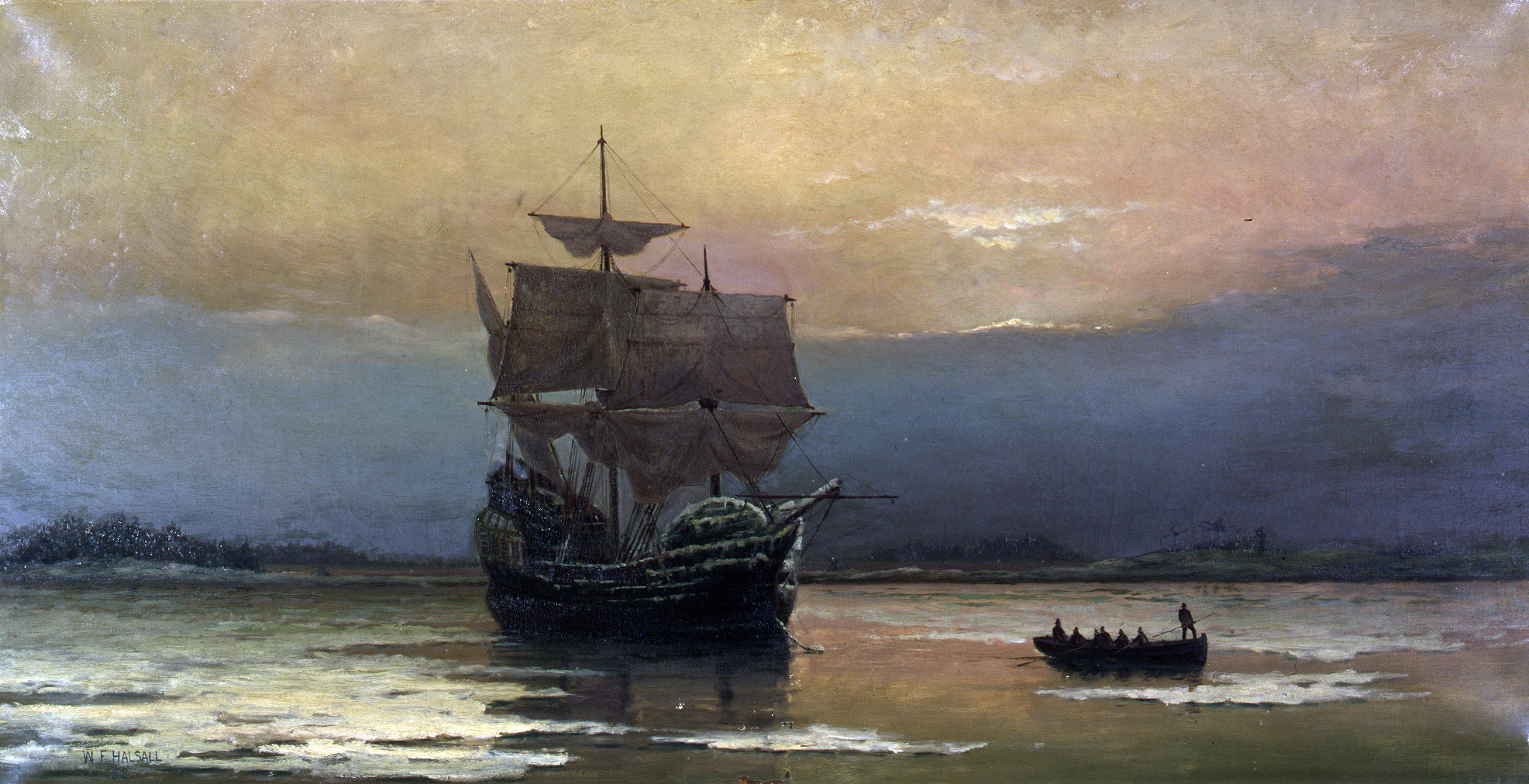
The Mayflower transported the Pilgrims to the New World in 1620, as depicted in William Halsall's The Mayflower in Plymouth Sound, 1882.

After several failed attempts, the first permanent English settlement in mainland North America was established in 1607 at Jamestown in the Virginia. In 1630, the Puritans established the Massachusetts Bay Colony; they emphasised not only pure religiosity, but also education and entrepreneurship.

Smaller colonies followed throughout the 17th and early 18th centuries. Each colony reported separately to London. During British colonization, liberal administrative, juridical, and market institutions were introduced. The colonial period also saw the introduction of indentured servitude and slavery. All of the Thirteen Colonies were involved in the slave trade.

=== Early history ===
Over time, the Thirteen Colonies gradually obtained more self-government. British mercantilist policies became more stringent, benefiting the mother country, which resulted in trade restrictions. Tensions escalated from 1765 to 1775 over issues of taxation without any American representation in Parliament. Congress unanimously declared independence in July 1776, formally initiating the Revolutionary War. The British managed to control New York City and parts of the South, but 90% of the American population was controlled by the Patriots. The entry of the French and Spanish decisively hurt British efforts. The Treaty of Paris ended the war in 1783, and the United States of America became the first colony in the world to successfully achieve independence in the modern era.

=== War of 1812 ===
The two nations fought again in the War of 1812. Neither side prevailed. The end of the war marked the end of a long period of conflict (1775–1815) and ushered in a new era of peace between the two nations. It was celebrated in the US as a victorious "second war of independence", while the British, having finally defeated Napoleon at the Battle of Waterloo, celebrated that triumph and largely forgot their second war with the US.

=== American Civil War ===
Relations verged on open conflict during the war, and remained chilly after it as Americans resented British and Canadian roles in their Civil War. Both sides worked to make sure tensions did not escalate toward war. The arbitration of the Alabama Claims in 1872 provided a satisfactory reconciliation; The British paid the United States $15.5 million for the economic damage caused by Confederate Navy warships purchased from it. The British also withdrew from their military and political responsibilities in North America, bringing home their troops from Canada (keeping Halifax as an Atlantic naval base), and turning responsibility over to the locals; in 1867, the separate Canadian colonies unified into a self-governing confederation named the "Dominion of Canada".

=== World Wars ===
The Great Rapprochement saw the convergence of social and political objectives between London and Washington from 1895 until World War I began in 1914. During World War I, the Americans planned to send money, food and munitions, but it soon became clear that millions of soldiers would be needed to decide the war on the Western Front. Two million soldiers were sent to Europe, with more on the way as the war ended.

Throughout the 1920s and 1930s, the level of mutual hostility was moderately high. The British diplomatic establishment largely distrusted the United States for a series of reasons. They included British suspicion of America's newfound global power, intentions, and reliability. Despite the frictions, London realized the United States was now the strongest power, and made it a cardinal principle of British foreign policy to "cultivate the closest relations with the United States".

Although many of the American people were sympathetic to Britain during its World War II conflict with Nazi Germany, there was widespread opposition to American intervention in European affairs. But beginning in March 1941, the United States enacted Lend-Lease in the form of tanks, fighter airplanes, munitions, bullets, food, and medical supplies. Britain received $31.4 billion out of a total of $50.1 billion sent to the Allies. Lend-lease aid was freely given, with no payments. There were also cash loans that were repaid at low rates over half a century. In August 1941, Churchill and Roosevelt announced the Atlantic Charter at a meeting in Newfoundland. It became a fundamental document—All the Allies had to sign it—and it led to the formation of the United Nations. Shortly after the Pearl Harbor attack, Churchill spent several weeks in Washington with the senior staff hammering out wartime strategy with the American counterparts at the Arcadia Conference. They set up the Combined Chiefs of Staff to plot and coordinate strategy and operations. Military cooperation was close and successful. Technical collaboration was even closer, as the two nations shared secrets and weapons. Millions of American servicemen were based in Britain during the war. Americans were paid five times more than comparable British servicemen, which led to a certain amount of friction with British men.

=== Cold War ===
In the aftermath of the war, Britain faced a deep financial crisis, whereas the United States enjoyed an economic boom. The United States continued to finance the British treasury after the war. Much of this aid was designed to restore infrastructure and help refugees. Britain received an emergency loan of $3.75 billion in 1946; it was a 50-year loan with a low 2% interest rate. A more permanent solution was the Marshall Plan of 1948–51, which poured $13 billion into western Europe, of which $3.3 billion went to Britain to help modernise its infrastructure and business practices. The aid was a gift and carried requirements that Britain balance its budget, control tariffs, and maintain adequate currency reserves. In British Malaya, the British colonialists got American aid in the war against the communist independence movement (1948–1960). The need to form a united front against the Soviet threat compelled the US and Britain to cooperate in helping to form the North Atlantic Treaty Organization with their European allies. NATO is a mutual defence alliance whereby an attack on one member country is deemed an attack on all members.

The Suez Crisis erupted in October 1956 after Britain, France, and Israel invaded Egypt to regain control of the Suez Canal. Eisenhower had repeatedly warned London against any such action and feared a collapse of Western influence and the risk of a wider war in the region. Washington responded with heavy financial and diplomatic pressure to force the invaders to withdraw. When it became clear that the international sanctions were serious, the invaders withdrew in consideration of the very sizeable British post-war debt. The world noted Britain's fall from status in the Middle East and worldwide, and Anglo-American cooperation fell to the lowest point since the 1890s. However, the new prime minister Harold Macmillan (1957–1963) restored good terms with Eisenhower and President John F. Kennedy (1961–1963).

Throughout the 1980s, Thatcher was strongly supportive of Reagan's unwavering stance towards the Soviet Union. Often described as "political soulmates" and a high point in the "Special Relationship", Reagan and Thatcher met many times throughout their political careers.

=== Post-Cold War ===
When the United States became the world's lone superpower after the dissolution of the Soviet Union, new threats emerged that confronted the United States and its NATO allies. With military build-up beginning in August 1990 and the use of force beginning in January 1991, the United States, followed at a distance by Britain, provided the two largest forces respectively for the coalition army which liberated Kuwait from Saddam Hussein's regime during the Persian Gulf War.

In the 1997 general election, the British Labour Party was elected to office for the first time in eighteen years. The new prime minister, Tony Blair, and Bill Clinton both used the expression "Third Way" to describe their centre-left ideologies. In August 1997, the American people expressed solidarity with the British people, sharing in their grief and sense of shock on the death of Diana, Princess of Wales, who perished in a car crash in Paris. Throughout 1998 and 1999, the United States and Britain sent troops to impose peace during the Kosovo War. Tony Blair made it a point to develop very close relationships with the White House.

=== War on terror and Iraq War ===
Tony Blair and George W. Bush at a press conference in the White House on November 12, 2004

Sixty-seven Britons were among the 2,977 victims killed during the terrorist attacks on the World Trade Center and elsewhere on September 11, 2001. Al-Qaeda was the attacker. Following the attacks, there was an enormous outpouring of sympathy from the United Kingdom for the American people, and Blair was one of Bush's strongest international supporters for military action against Al-Qaeda and the Taliban. Indeed, Blair became the most articulate spokesman. President Bush told Congress that "America has no truer friend than Great Britain".

The United States declared a war on terror following the attacks. British forces participated in NATO's war in Afghanistan. Blair took the lead (against the opposition of France, Canada, Germany, China, and Russia) in advocating the invasion of Iraq in 2003. Again, Britain was second only to the US in sending forces to Iraq. Both sides wound down after 2009 and withdrew their last troops in 2011. President Bush and Prime Minister Blair provided sustained mutual political and diplomatic support and won votes in Congress and parliament against their critics at home. During this period, Secretary of Defense Donald Rumsfeld said that "America has no finer ally than the United Kingdom." The July 7, 2005 London bombings emphasised the difference in the terrorist threat to both nations. Terrorism against the United States and its military assets was primarily committed by foreign groups, like the al-Qaeda network and other Islamic extremists from the Middle East. The London bombings were carried out by homegrown extremist Muslims, and they emphasised the United Kingdom's threat from the radicalisation of its own people.

After claims by Liberty those British airports had been used by the CIA for extraordinary rendition flights, the Association of Chief Police Officers launched an investigation in November 2005. The report was published in June 2007 and found no evidence to support the claim. This was on the same day the Council of Europe released its report with evidence that the UK had colluded in extraordinary rendition, thus directly contradicting ACPO's findings. A 2018 report by the Intelligence and Security Committee of Parliament found the United Kingdom, specifically the MI5 and MI6, to be complicit in many of the renditions done by the US, having helped fund them, supplying them with intelligence and knowingly allowing them to happen.

By 2007, support amongst the British public for the Iraq war had plummeted. Despite Tony Blair's historically low approval ratings with the British people, mainly due to allegations of faulty government intelligence of Iraq possessing weapons of mass destruction, his unapologetic and unwavering stance for the British alliance with the United States can be summed up in his own words. He said, "We should remain the closest ally of the US... not because they are powerful, but because we share their values." The alliance between George W. Bush and Tony Blair seriously damaged the prime minister's standing in the eyes of many British citizens. Tony Blair argued it was in the United Kingdom's interest to "protect and strengthen the bond" with the United States regardless of who is in the White House. A perception that the relationship was unequal led to use of the term "Poodle-ism" in the British media, that Britain and its leaders were lapdogs to the Americans.

On June 11, 2009, the British Overseas Territory of Bermuda accepted four Chinese Uighurs from the American detainment facility at the Guantanamo Bay Naval Base in Cuba. All had been captured during the United States-led invasion of Afghanistan in October 2001. This decision angered London, as British officials felt they should have been consulted.

=== Tension with Scotland ===
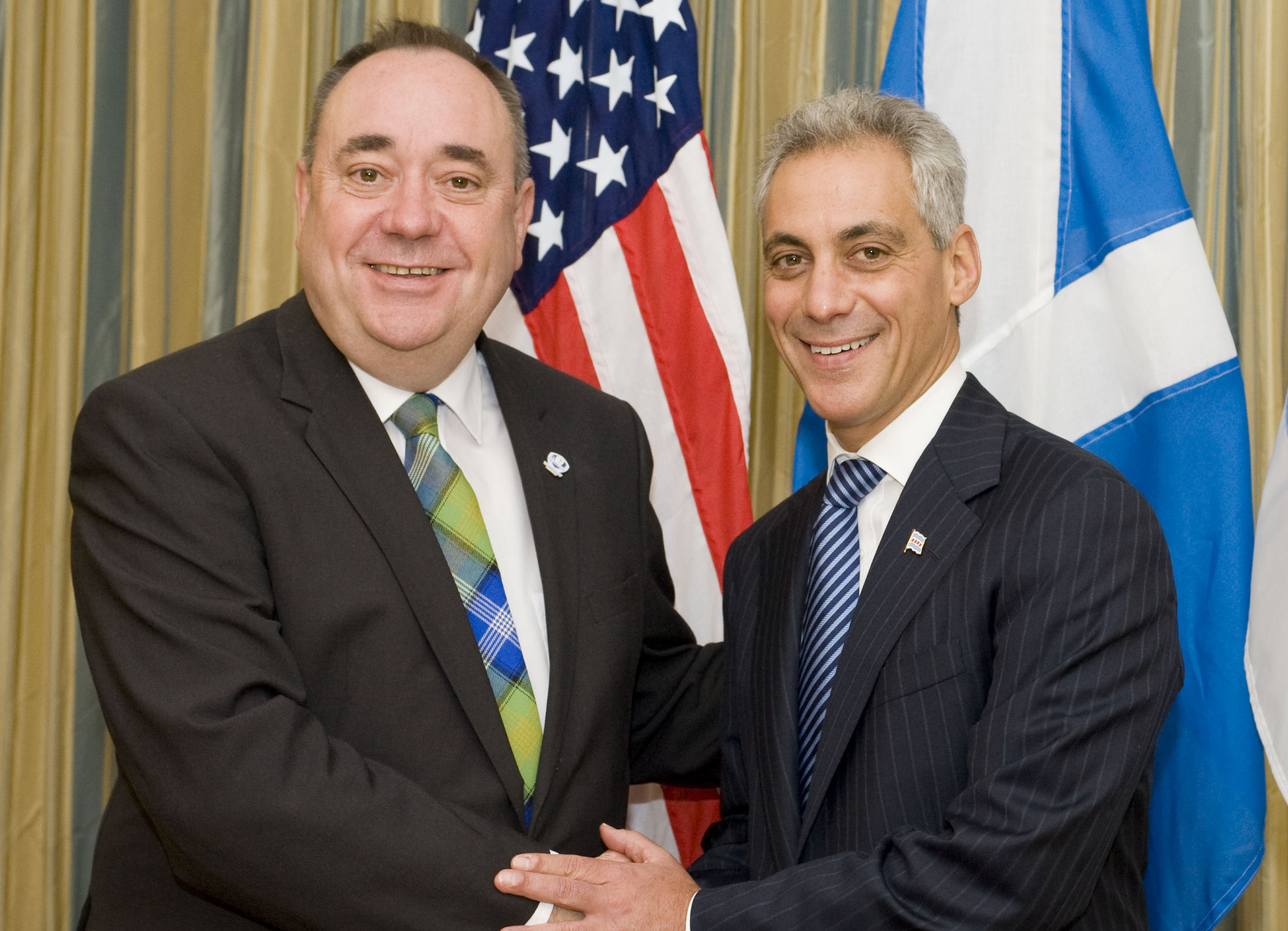
First Minister of Scotland, Alex Salmond, (left) was heavily criticised by Washington regarding the Scottish Government's decision to release Abdelbaset al-Megrahi.

On August 20, 2009, the Scottish Government, headed by First Minister Alex Salmond, announced that it would release Abdelbaset al-Megrahi on medical grounds. He was the only person convicted in the terrorist plot which killed 190 Americans and 43 Britons on Pan American Worldways' Flight 103 over the town of Lockerbie, Scotland on December 21, 1988. He was sentenced to life in prison in 2001, but was now released after being diagnosed with terminal cancer, with around three months to live. Americans said the decision was uncompassionate and insensitive to the memory of the victims of the 1988 Lockerbie bombing.

President Barack Obama said that the decision was "highly objectionable". US Ambassador Louis Susman said that although the decision made by Scotland was extremely regrettable, relations with the United Kingdom would remain fully intact and strong. The British government, led by Prime Minister Gordon Brown, was not involved in the release and Prime Minister Brown stated at a press conference his government had played 'no role' in the Scottish decision, as responsibility for Scots law and justice in Scotland is the full responsibility of the Scottish Government. Abdelbaset al-Megrahi died May 20, 2012, at the age of 60.

The decision from the Scottish Government to release Abdelbaset al-Megrahi was defended by First Minister Alex Salmond, who said that he was released "in good faith" after the Scottish Government received "expert advice" which advised that al-Megrahi had only three months to live. Salmond claimed that the advice had been presented to the Scottish Government by Dr Andrew Fraser, the head of medical services for the Scottish Prison Service, who Salmond described as "a physician of great experience and a man with personal integrity". In 2010, Salmond rejected a request from the United States Senate to testify about Libya and the decision to release Abdelbaset al-Megrahi.

=== Present status ===
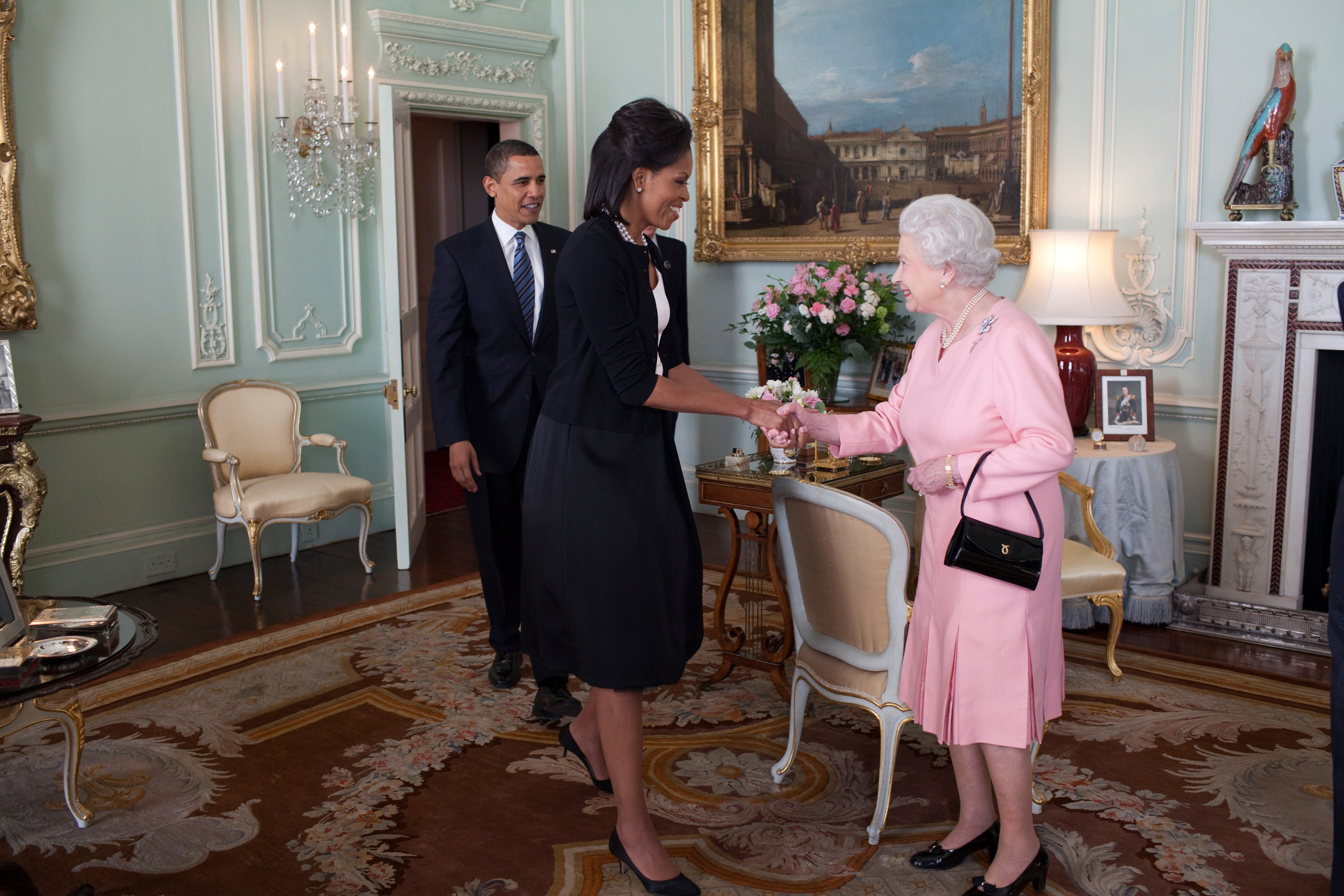
Queen Elizabeth II welcomed President Barack Obama and First Lady Michelle Obama to Buckingham Palace on April 1, 2009.

British policy is that the relationship with the United States represents the United Kingdom's "most important bilateral relationship" in the world. United States Secretary of State Hillary Clinton paid tribute to the relationship in February 2009 by saying, "it stands the test of time".

John Dumbrell wrote in 2006:

Any confidence in the absence of British anti-Americanism is misplaced. British attitudes towards the US often exhibit cultural snobbery, envy, crude stereotyping, and resentment at America's power in the world. Such attitudes do not, as we will see demonstrated in public opinion surveys, amount to a rabid hostility. In many ways, they are understandable expressions of group feeling towards an ever-present and powerful 'other'. Many of these attitudes – that, for example, the US is the land both of rampant, destructive individualism and of homogenized sameness – are inherently contradictory. It is absurd, however, to pretend that they do not exist.

==== Obama administration 2009–2017 ====
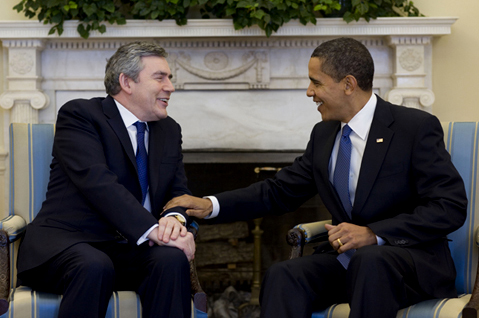
Prime Minister Gordon Brown, and President Barack Obama meet at the White House in March 2009

On March 3, 2009, Gordon Brown made his first visit to the White House. During his visit, he presented the president a gift in the form of a pen holder carved from HMS Gannet, which served anti-slavery missions off the coast of Africa. Barack Obama's gift to the prime minister was a box of 25 DVDs with movies including Star Wars and E.T. The wife of the prime minister, Sarah Brown, gave the Obama daughters, Sasha and Malia, two dresses from British clothing retailer Topshop, and a few unpublished books that have not reached the United States. Michelle Obama gave the prime minister's sons two Marine One helicopter toys. During this visit to the United States, Gordon Brown made an address to a joint session of the United States Congress, a privilege rarely accorded to foreign heads of government.

In March 2009, a Gallup poll of Americans showed 36% identified Britain as their country's "most valuable ally", followed by Canada, Japan, Israel, and Germany rounding out the top five. The poll also indicated that 89% of Americans view the United Kingdom favourably, second only to Canada with 90%. According to the Pew Research Center, a global survey conducted in July 2009 revealed that 70% of Britons who responded had a favourable view of the United States.

In 2010, Obama stated, "The United States has no closer friend and ally than the United Kingdom, and I reiterated my deep and personal commitment to the special relationship between our two countries." In February 2011, The Daily Telegraph, based on evidence from WikiLeaks, reported that the United States had tendered sensitive information about the British Trident nuclear arsenal (whose missile delivery systems are manufactured and maintained in the United States) to the Russian Federation as part of a deal to encourage Russia to ratify the New START Treaty. Professor Malcolm Chalmers of the Royal United Services Institute for Defence and Security Studies speculated that serial numbers could undermine Britain's non-verification policy by providing Russia "with another data point to gauge the size of the British arsenal".

On May 25, 2011, during his official visit to the UK, Obama reaffirmed the relationship between the United Kingdom and the United States of America in an address to Parliament at Westminster Hall. Amongst other points, Obama stated: "I've come here today to reaffirm one of the oldest, one of the strongest alliances the World has ever known. It's long been said that the United States and the United Kingdom share a special relationship." In the final days before the Scottish independence referendum in September 2014, Obama announced in public the vested interest of the United States of America in enjoying the continued partnership with a 'strong and united' UK which he described as "one of the closest allies we will ever have".

In 2015, GCHQ notified the US of links between Trump associates and Russian officials. During a joint press conference with Prime Minister Theresa May, Obama stated, "The bottom line is, is that we don't have a stronger partner anywhere in the world than the United Kingdom."

==== First Trump administration 2017–2021 ====
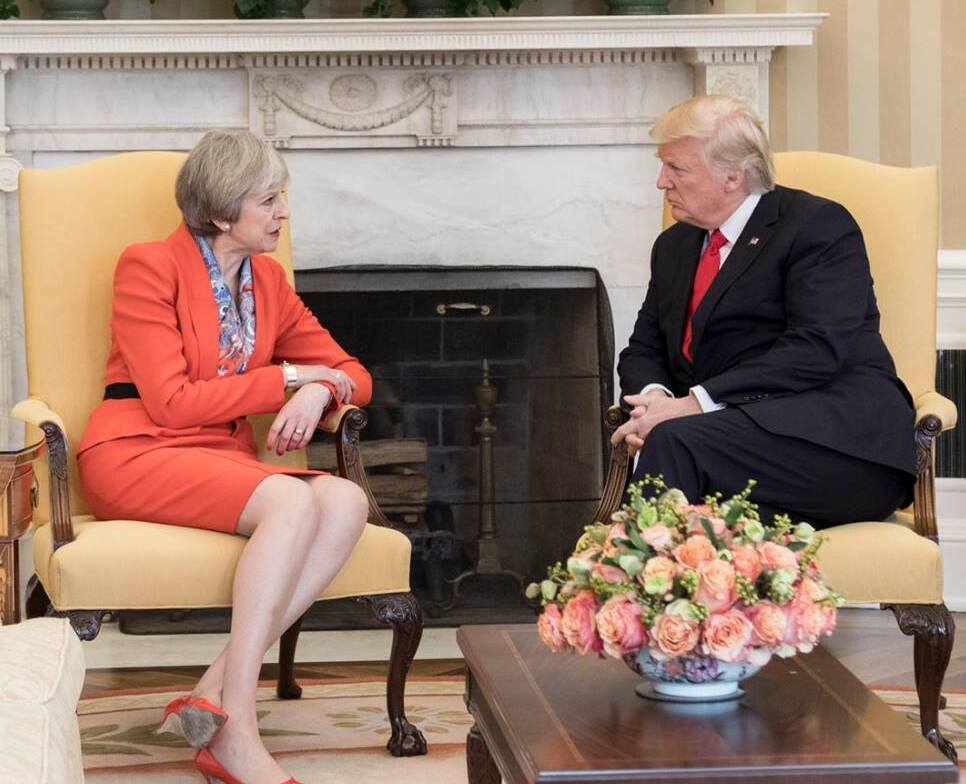
Prime Minister Theresa May and President Donald Trump meet at the White House in January 2017

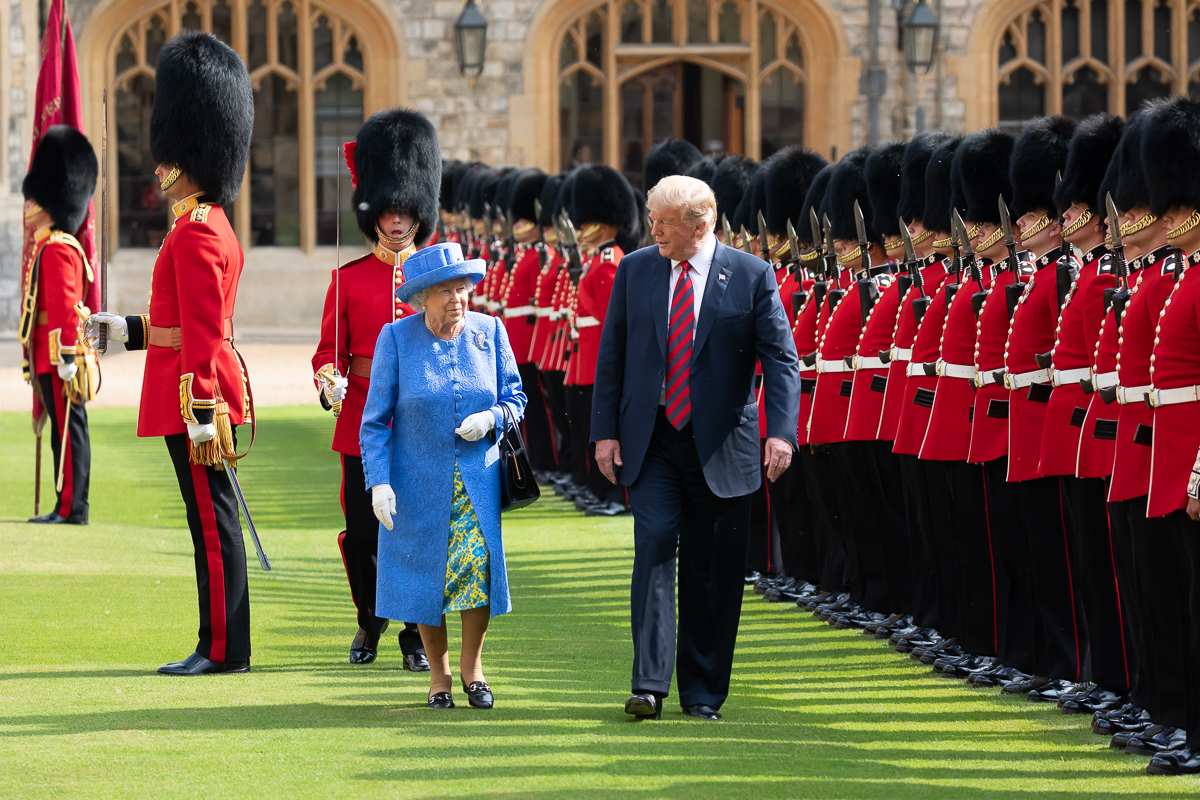
The Guard of Honour at Windsor Castle for the arrival of Queen Elizabeth II and President Trump in July 2018

President Donald Trump and British Prime Minister Theresa May aimed to continue the United Kingdom–United States special relationship. May was the first foreign leader Trump hosted in Washington after taking office and UKIP leader Nigel Farage was the first foreign politician Trump met with after winning the presidential election, when he was still President-elect. However, Trump was the subject of popular protests in Britain even before he took office, particularly because of his anti-immigration proposals, misogyny and racism. During his presidency there were protests when he was inaugurated, when he announced his first immigration ban on citizens from certain Muslim countries, and when he said he would recognize Jerusalem as the capital of Israel.

On June 4, 2017, Trump responded to a terror attack on London Bridge by attacking London Mayor Sadiq Khan for saying that there "was no reason to be alarmed". The comments were condemned by Khan, who stated that his remarks were deliberately taken out of context in that he was referring to an increased police presence in the days after the attack, which should not alarm the public. Trump also suggested that, "we must stop being politically correct and get down to the business of security for our people".

On November 29, 2017, Trump re-tweeted three videos posted by Jayda Fransen, deputy leader of the far-right nationalist Britain First party. One of the videos, titled 'Muslim immigrant beats up Dutch boy on crutches', was subsequently discredited by the Dutch embassy in the United States. The spokesperson for the Prime Minister said that what the President had done was 'wrong' and Foreign Secretary Boris Johnson said that 'hate speech had no place in the UK'. In response, Trump tweeted at the Prime Minister, suggesting that she worry about immigration in her own country rather than whom he chose to retweet. White House spokeswoman Sarah Sanders said that the President attempted to start a conversation about immigration.

May was the first foreign leader to visit Trump after his inauguration, and she invited him to make a return visit. More than 1.8 million UK citizens signed a petition to rescind the invitation, and Parliament debated a nonbinding resolution to that effect in February 2017. The visit was tentatively planned for late February 2018, and would include a ceremonial opening of the new American embassy in Nine Elms. However, on January 11, 2018, he cancelled the visit and denounced the new embassy in a tweet saying:

Donald J. Trump
(@realDonaldTrump)
tweeted:

Reason I canceled my trip to London is that I am not a big fan of the Obama Administration having sold perhaps the best located and finest embassy in London for "peanuts," only to build a new one in an off location for 1.2 billion dollars. Bad deal. Wanted me to cut the ribbon-NO!

January 11, 2018

This was despite the official reason for relocating the embassy due to the security, as the Grosvenor Square site couldn't accommodate the requirements for being 100 ft (30.5 m) away from the street, and the fact that the move was decided by Obama's predecessor Bush, who approved the relocation in 2008. It was speculated that the real reason for cancelling the visit was due to Trump's unpopularity and the possibility of large protests against him in London.

Trump made a second visit in June 2019, this time as guests of the Queen and to hold talks with May. Thousands protested his visit, just like they did when he made his first trip.

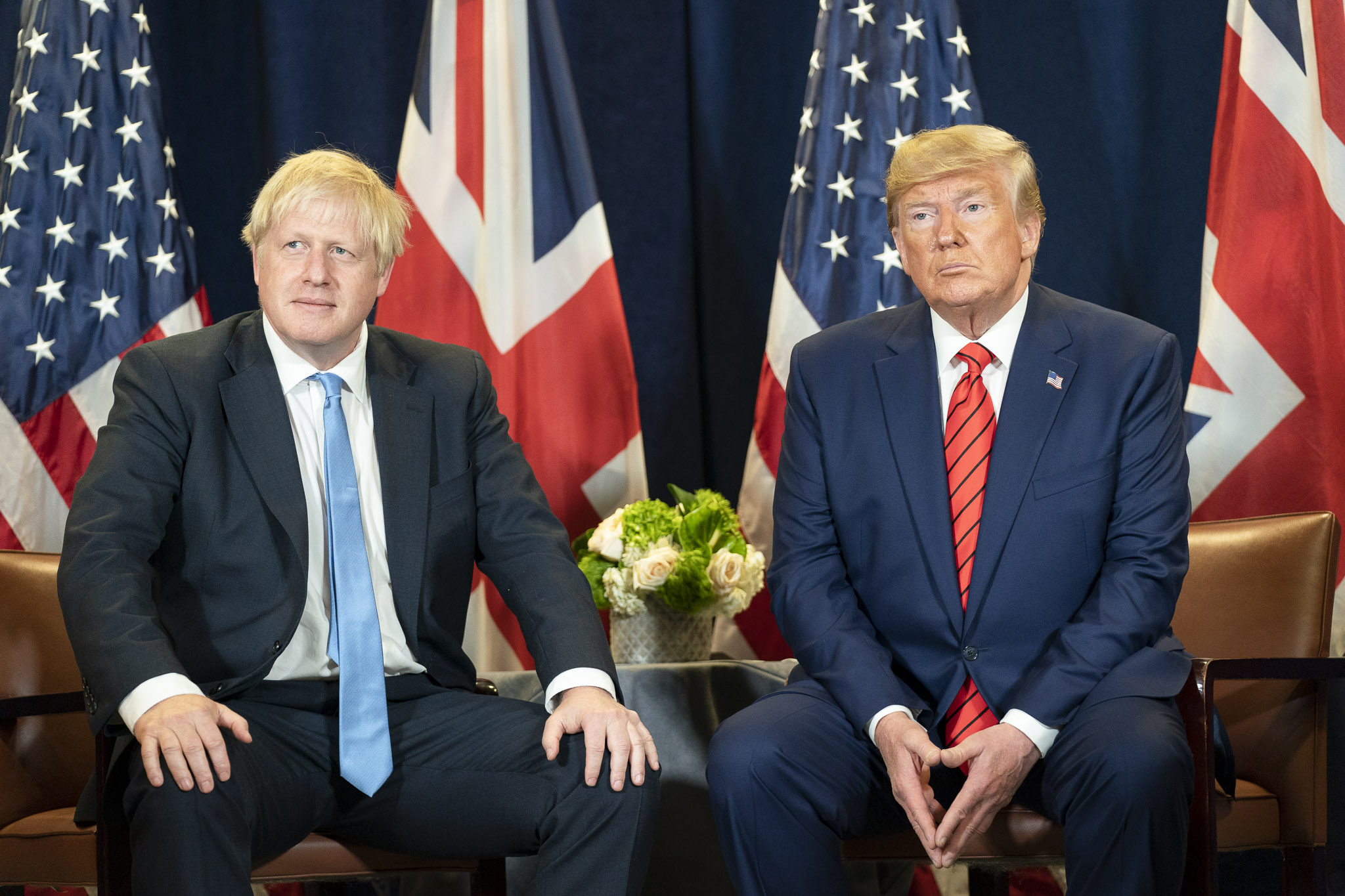
Prime Minister Boris Johnson with President Donald Trump in September 2019

On July 7, 2019, secret diplomatic cables from Ambassador Kim Darroch to the British government, dating from 2017 to 2019, were leaked to The Mail on Sunday. They included Darroch's unflattering assessments of the Trump administration, e.g. that it was "inept and insecure". In response, Nigel Farage said Darroch was "totally unsuitable" for office, and Trump tweeted that Darroch was "not liked or well thought of within the US" and that "we will no longer deal with him". The Prime Minister, Theresa May, expressed support for Darroch and ordered a leak inquiry. On July 10, Darroch resigned as Ambassador to the United States. He wrote that "the current situation is making it impossible for me to carry out my role as I would like". Previously, Boris Johnson, the frontrunner in the election to replace May, had declined to publicly back Darroch. Consensus among political commentators in the UK was that this made Darroch's position untenable. May and the leader of the opposition, Jeremy Corbyn, praised Darroch's service in the House of Commons and deplored that he had to resign under pressure from the US.

===== Controversy over American foods =====
In 2017, US President Donald Trump appointed pharmaceutical heir Woody Johnson, a financial supporter of his campaign, as ambassador 2017–2021. Johnson advocated for more agricultural trade and the deregulation of US food exports to Britain. In March 2019, Johnson wrote an article in the Daily Telegraph promoting American chlorinated chicken as safe, and stating that health fears over hormone-fed beef were "myths". This came after he urged the UK to open up to the US agriculture market after the British exit from the European Union and ignore the "smear campaign" of those with "their own protectionist agenda".

Johnson was criticised by several British agriculture standard boards, such as the Red Tractor Assurance whose CEO, Jim Moseley stated the UK's food standards were "now under threat from ... the United States food lobby". Minette Batters, president of the UK National Farmers Union, agreed with Johnson's claims that chlorine-rinsed chicken was safe for consumption, but stated that factors such as animal welfare and environmental protection also had to be considered. George Eustace, former British agriculture minister, told the press:

Agriculture in the US remains quite backward in many respects....Whereas we have a 'farm to fork' approach to managing disease and contamination risk throughout the supply chain through good husbandry, the US is more inclined to simply treat contamination of its meat at the end with a chlorine or similar wash.

===== Blocking Chinese technology =====
In 2020, while the UK was planning to invest in new 5G mobile telecommunications equipment, Washington was openly lobbying and pressuring the British government, to prevent allowing the Chinese telecommunications giant Huawei from installing its equipment in the UK. This was over allegations it will allow the Chinese to espionage in the country, and this might be a break in the Five Eyes intelligence programme. Since 2003, the UK has allowed its telecoms operators, such as the incumbent BT, to install Huawei equipment in its infrastructure backbone. To prevent any concerns about possible hacking after reports of unusual activity in the Huawei equipment, in 2010 Huawei jointly created with the British intelligence agency GCHQ an equipment investigate centre in the outskirts of Banbury called the Huawei Cyber Security Evaluation Centre which is also known by its nickname "the Cell". In July 2020 after American pressure, the British government announced that it has banned adding any new Huawei telecoms equipment into the British landline and mobile networks, and request that all companies replace the existing equipment by 2027.

==== Biden administration 2021–2025 ====
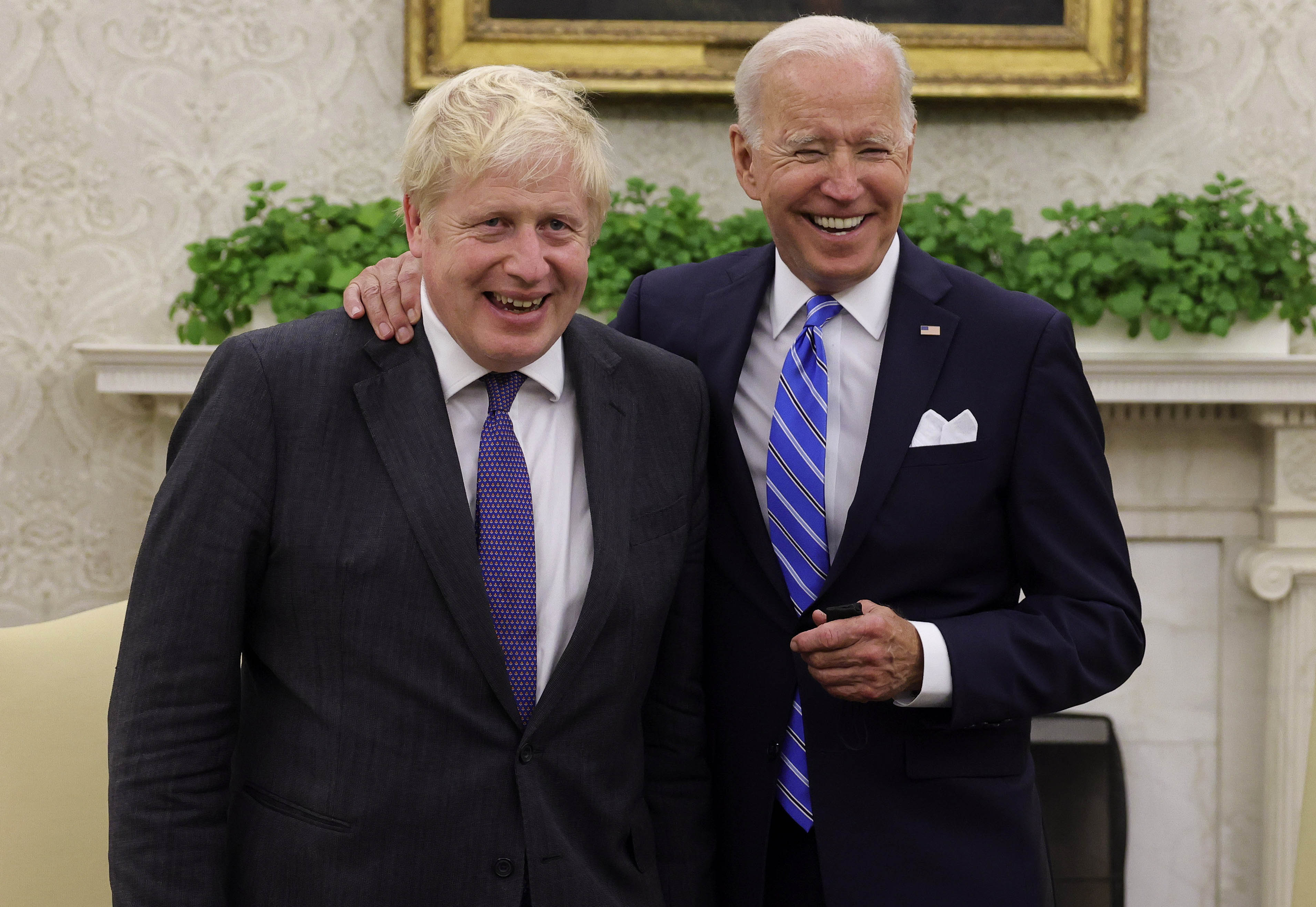
Prime Minister Boris Johnson and President Joe Biden meet at the White House in September 2021

Biden's first overseas trip and first face-to-face meeting with a British Prime Minister was at the 2021 G7 Summit, hosted in Cornwall, England, in June. Johnson stated "there's so much that [the US] want to do together" with us. The first meeting between the two leaders included plans to re-establish travel links between the US and UK, which had been banned by the US since the start of the pandemic and to agree a deal (the New Atlantic Charter), which commits the countries to working together on "the key challenges of this century - cyber security, emerging technologies, global health and climate change". President Biden explicitly "affirmed the special relationship". The revitalized Atlantic Charter would build "on the commitments and aspirations set out eighty years ago" and also "reaffirm" the "commitment to work together to realise our vision for a more peaceful and prosperous future."

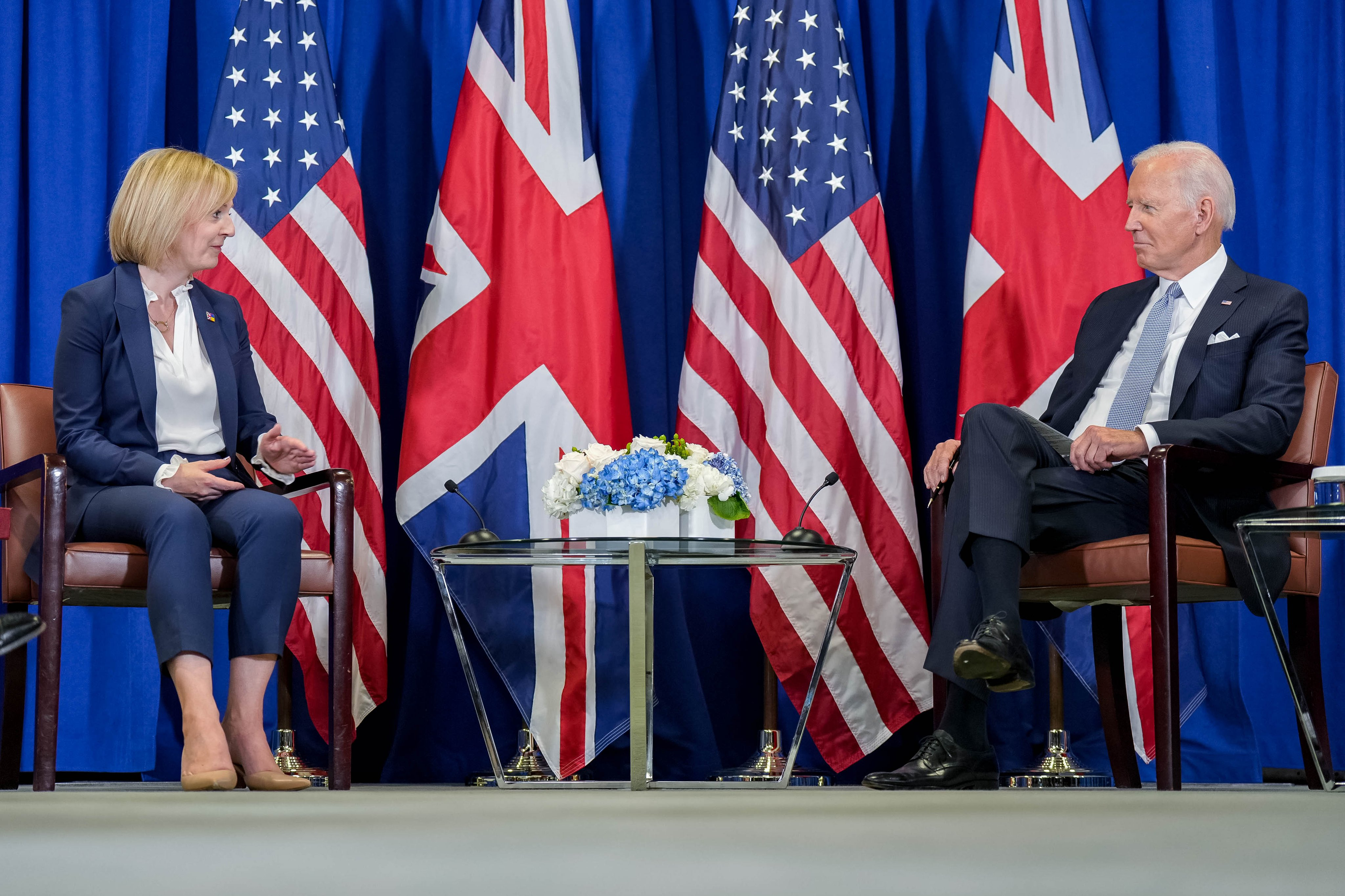
Prime Minister Liz Truss with President Biden in New York City, September 2022

The chaotic withdrawal from Afghanistan and fall of Kabul in August 2021 hurt United Kingdom–United States relations, with the British government briefing media against the American government.

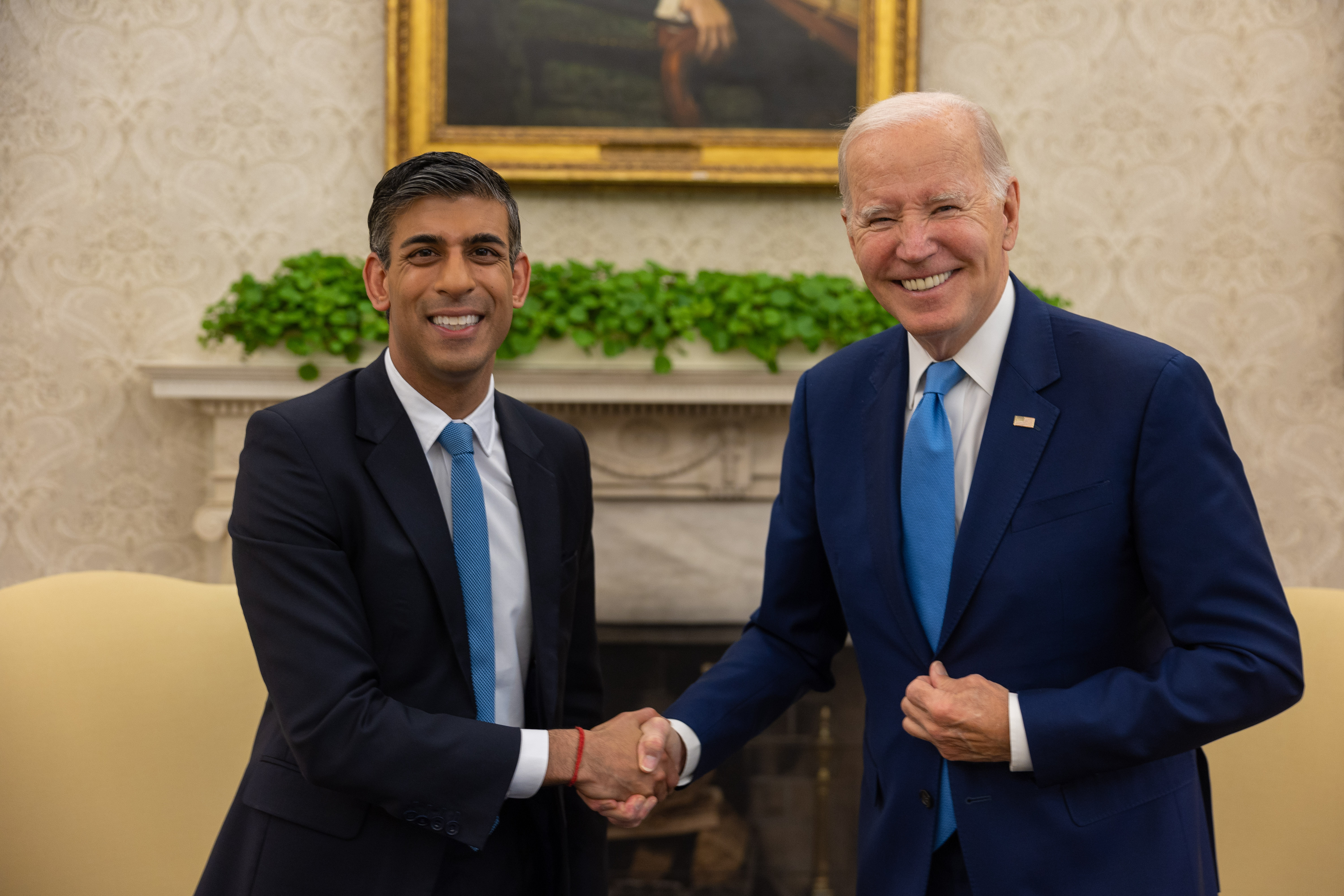
Prime Minister Rishi Sunak with President Biden in the Oval Office, June 2023

===== AUKUS =====
On September 15, 2021, the leaders of the US, the UK, and Australia announced "AUKUS":

a new security partnership in the Indo-Pacific, building on the longstanding alliance between the three to share intelligence, deepen cooperation, and help Australia build a new nuclear-powered submarine to counter China.

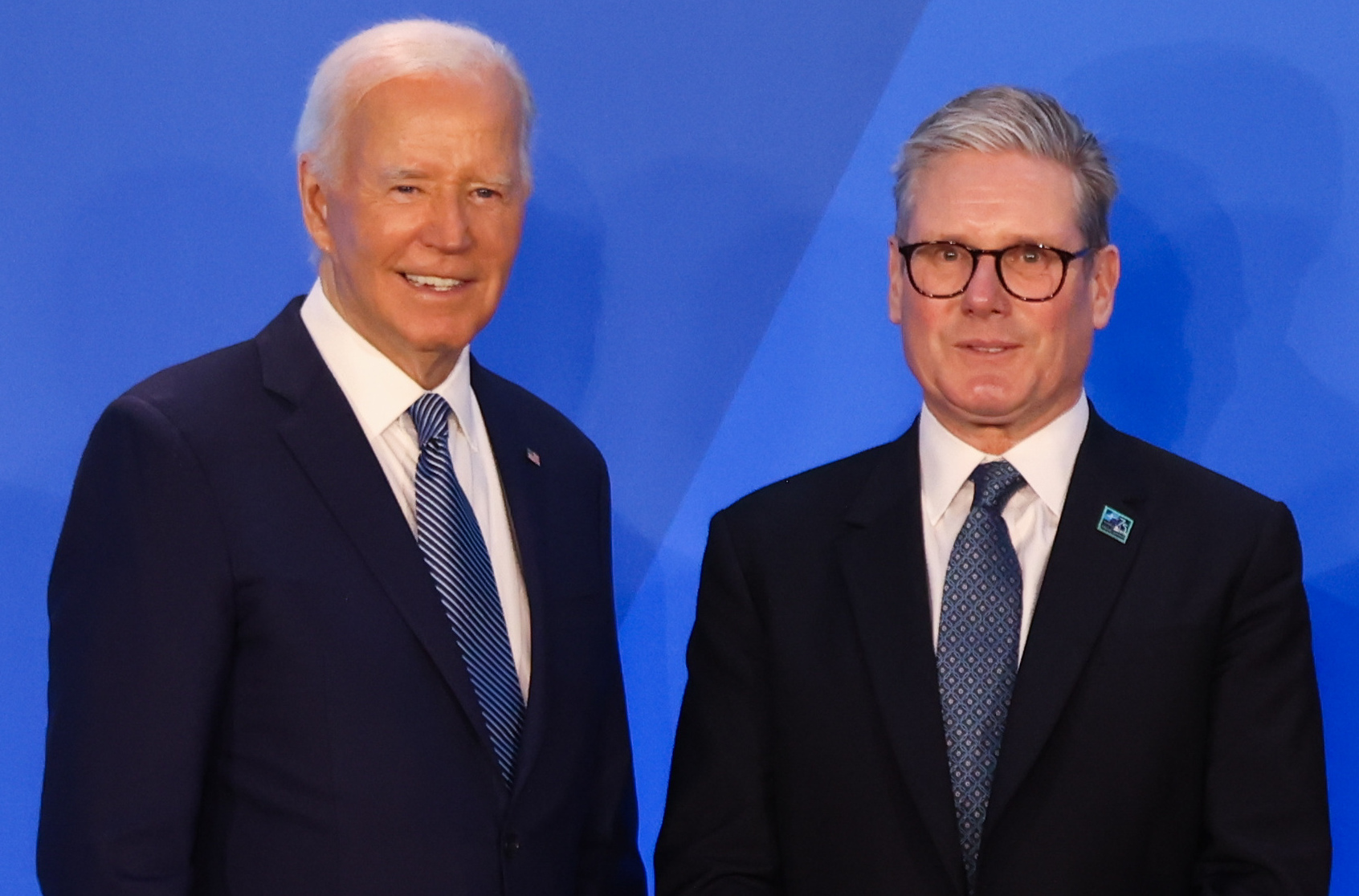
President Biden with Prime Minister Keir Starmer at the 2024 Washington summit

===== Rejection of new trade agreement =====
On September 21, 2021, Boris Johnson stated that he would not commit to a new trade agreement by 2024, stating that President Biden has "a lot of fish to fry."

==== Second Trump administration 2025–present ====
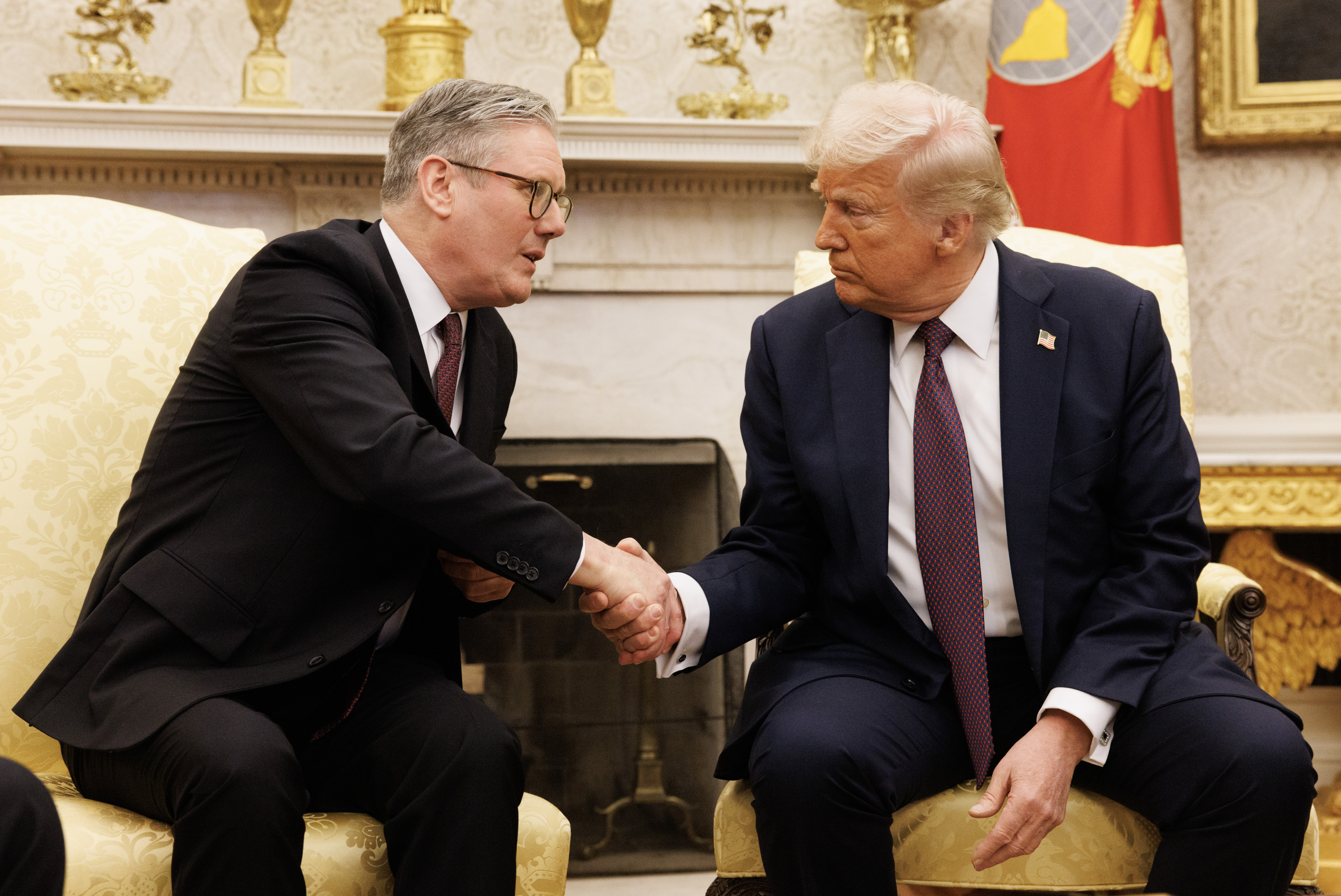
British Prime Minister Keir Starmer holds talks with U.S. President Donald Trump at the White House.

On May 8, 2025, the UK and US announced an agreement in principle on an Economic Prosperity Deal, paving the way for renewed negotiations.

According to a POLITICO-Public First poll conducted in April 2025, the vast majority of American and British adults support their governments reaching an agreement, but less than a third of respondents in the UK and 44% of Americans said they believe President Donald Trump will stick to it.

In September 2025, President Trump made his second official state visit to the United Kingdom, staying at Windsor Castle and later meeting Prime Minister Keir Starmer at Chequers.

In November 2025, sources told CNN that the UK had suspended intelligence sharing with the US about suspected drug trafficking vessels in the Caribbean over the risks of being complicit in fatal US military strikes on the vessels, which the UK reportedly believes are illegal.

In January 2026, the U.S. under President Donald Trump expressed renewed desire in annexing Greenland, which is an autonomous territory of Denmark, prompting UK Prime Minister Keir Starmer to say the United Kingdom opposed any change to Greenland's status absent Greenlandic and Danish consent. The UK also joined Operation Arctic Endurance, a military operation in Greenland, to counter the crisis. Trump later backed away from tariff threats and ruled out taking Greenland by force. The UK also declined to join Trump's proposed international "Board of Peace" initiative, citing legal concerns and reservations about possible participation by Russian president Vladimir Putin.

The British government declined to voice support the 2026 U.S. strikes on Iran while also not condemning them. The UK did not permit the U.S. to use British military bases for the attack, including RAF Fairford and the military bases on Diego Garcia.

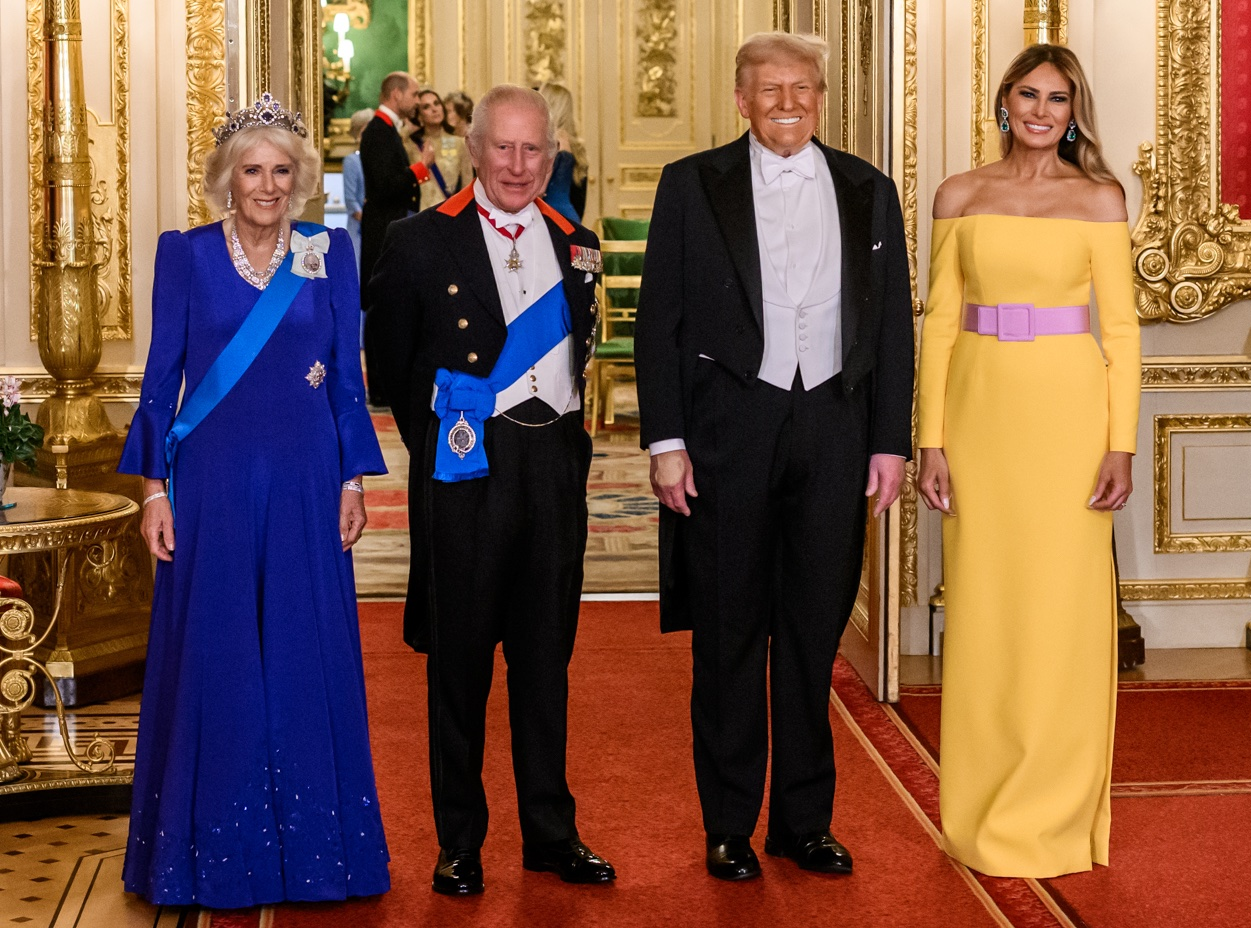
President Donald Trump and First Lady Melania Trump with King Charles III and Queen Camilla at Windsor Castle, 2025

According to a 2026 Gallup poll, 76% of Americans have favorable opinions of the United Kingdom, while 18% have an unfavorable opinion. This was the lowest on record, as well as down from 88% in 2025. It was largely driven by a drop in favorability of the UK among Republicans, whose favorability of the country dropped from 84% in 2025 to 64% in 2026. According to a 2026 Pew Research Center survey, 41% of British people had a favorable view of the United States, while 58% had a negative view.

On April 24, 2026, Reuters reported that a leaked internal Pentagon communication indicated that the United States was considering reviewing its support for the United Kingdom's sovereignty claim over the Falkland Islands as a potential retaliatory measure against NATO allies, including Britain, for their limited support in the war with Iran. The British government responded by reaffirming the United Kingdom's sovereignty claim over the Falkland Islands, whose sovereignty is disputed by Argentina, and stated that "the islanders' right to self-determination is paramount".

== Trade, investment, and the economy ==
The United States accounts for the United Kingdom's largest single export market, buying $57 billion worth of British goods in 2007. Total trade of imports and exports between the United Kingdom and the United States amounted to the sum of $107.2 billion in 2007.

The United States and the United Kingdom share the world's largest foreign direct investment partnership. In 2005, American direct investment in the United Kingdom totaled $324 billion, while British direct investment in the United States totaled $282 billion. In a press conference that made several references to the special relationship, US Secretary of State John Kerry, in London with UK Foreign Secretary William Hague on September 9, 2013, said:

We are not only each other's largest investors in each of our countries, one to the other, but the fact is that every day almost one million people go to work in America for British companies that are in the United States, just as more than one million people go to work here in Great Britain for American companies that are here. So we are enormously tied together, obviously. And we are committed to making both the U.S.-UK and the U.S.-EU relationships even stronger drivers of our prosperity.

=== Trade agreements ===
In 2020, the two countries opened negotiations for a free trade agreement; however, talks have been postponed until 2025 at the earliest.

In 2022, with the administration of President Joe Biden uninterested in further negotiations, the United Kingdom began negotiating economic agreements with individual states. Regulation of international trade is a federal responsibility under the Commerce Clause of the US Constitution, preventing state agreements from changing customs rules; therefore, the UK has aimed at signing Memorandum of Understanding (MoU) agreements with the US states. MoUs aim to remove market access barriers and increase trade and investment opportunities for UK and US companies. Former British trade minister Penny Mordaunt claimed that US state-level deals would pave the way for a full UK-US FTA.

UK-US State Memorandum of Understanding Agreements
No.	Signed	State	Ref.
1	May 27, 2022	Indiana	
2	July 20, 2022	North Carolina	
3	December 7, 2022	South Carolina	
4	April 18, 2023	Oklahoma	
5	June 22, 2023	Utah	
6	September 25, 2023	Washington	
7	November 14, 2023	Florida	
8	March 13, 2024	Texas	

Trade negotiations ongoing:

- California
- Colorado
- Illinois
- New York

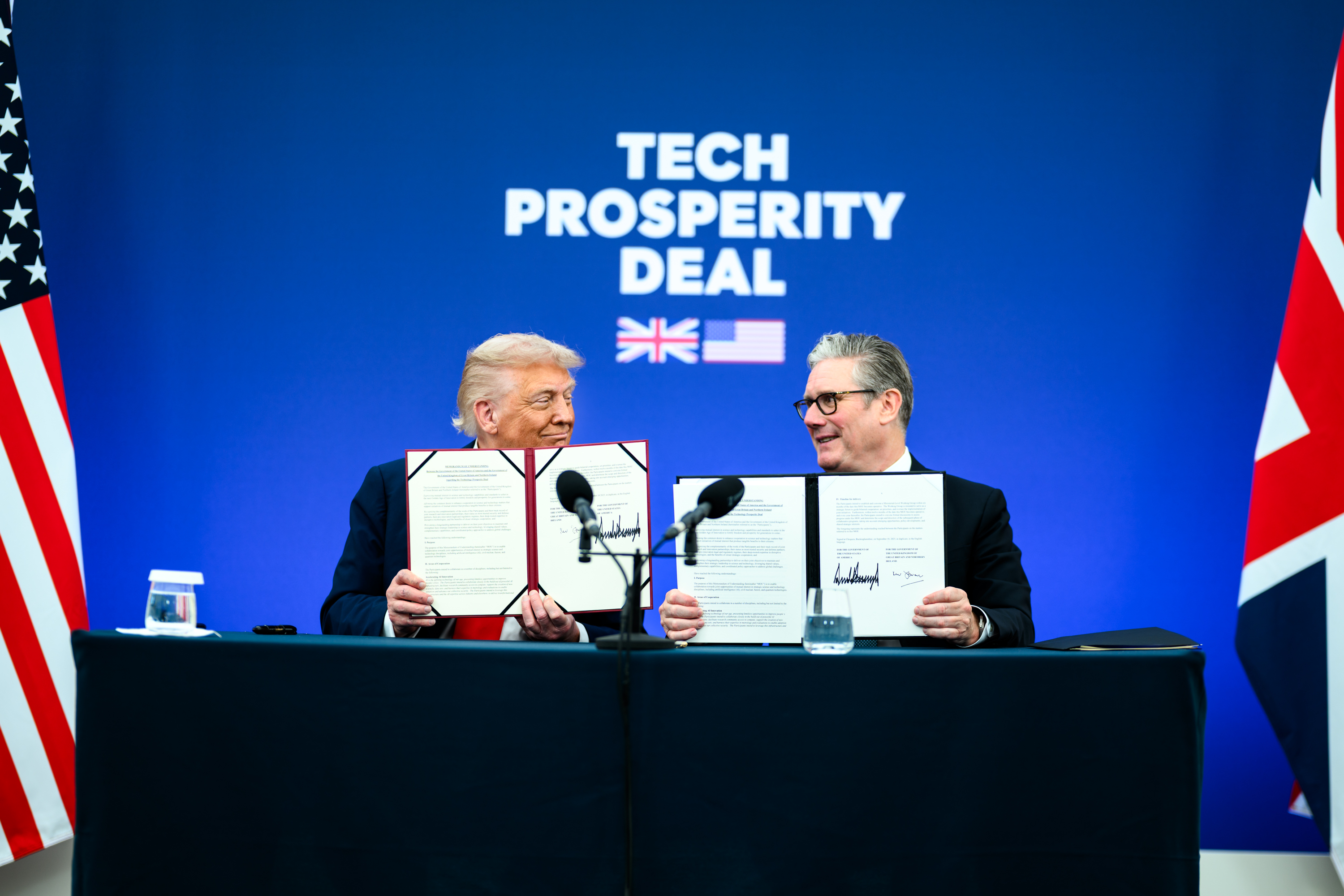
Donald Trump and Keir Starmer on September 18, 2025

In June 2023, Biden and Sunak announced the 'Atlantic Declaration' to strengthen economic ties between the UK and the US. The agreement included a limited trade pact covering critical minerals needed for EV batteries and a new data protection deal, in addition to easing trade barriers. The declaration commits both nations to increase research collaboration in future technologies, such as AI, future 5G and 6G telecoms, quantum, semiconductors and engineering biology. In addition to a commitment in principle to a new UK-US Data Bridge; that facilitates the transfer of data by UK businesses to certified US organisations.

During the signing of the accession of the United Kingdom to CPTPP on July 16, 2023, Kemi Badenoch blamed the lack of progress on the UK-US FTA on the change of administration from Donald Trump to Joe Biden after the 2020 election.

On October 3, 2023, Biden and Sunak were reported to be preparing a "foundational" trade agreement between the two countries which will be modelled on the Indo-Pacific Economic Framework, however it will not constitute a free trade agreement under World Trade Organization rules as the proposals do not contain market access commitments. The proposed partnership aims to cover subjects such as digital trade, labour protections and agriculture. On the same day, Badenoch reiterated that there was "zero" chance of a free trade agreement under President Biden's administration, citing his attitude to such deals.

=== 2026 Greenland dispute and trade war ===
Relations between the United Kingdom and the United States underwent a significant diplomatic rupture in early 2026. On January 17, 2026, President Donald Trump announced via Truth Social the imposition of a 10% tariff on all British goods, effective February 1, 2026. The administration stated the rate would increase to 25% on June 1, 2026, unless a deal was reached for the "Complete and Total purchase of Greenland" by the United States.

The tariffs were characterized as retaliation for the UK's participation in Operation Arctic Endurance, a multilateral mission supporting Danish sovereignty on the island. Prime Minister Keir Starmer condemned the measures as "completely wrong," asserting that "applying tariffs on allies for pursuing the collective security of NATO allies" was unacceptable and that Greenland's future remained a matter for Denmark and Greenlanders. The dispute has been described by analysts as the most significant threat to the Special Relationship since its inception.

At the World Economic Forum in Davos on January 21, 2026, Trump said the United States would not proceed with the tariffs on British goods that had been scheduled to take effect on February 1.

== Tourism ==
More than 4.5 million Britons visit the United States every year, spending $14 billion. Around 3 million people from the United States visit the United Kingdom every year, spending $10 billion. With the worldwide pandemic of COVID-19, international tourism in both countries collapsed in 2020.

Following the end of the COVID-19 pandemic, tourism has recovered globally, with some regions of the world experiencing a higher degree of tourism than before the pandemic. In 2023, the UK received 5.1 million visitors from the US, the highest number ever recorded; spending £6.3 billion. As of January 2025, British visitors to the US totalled almost 3 million, using a YTD format.

== Transportation ==
All three major American airlines, American Airlines, United Airlines, and Delta Air Lines fly directly between the US and the UK, principally between London and New York, although all three fly to Heathrow Airport from several hubs, as well as to other major UK airports such as Manchester Airport, Edinburgh Airport and Glasgow Airport. Additionally, Delta codeshares with the UK's Virgin Atlantic which it owns a 49% stake. Low-cost carriers JetBlue and Southwest Airlines fly between the eastern US and the British overseas territories of Bermuda, British Virgin Islands, Cayman Islands, and the Turks and Caicos Islands, with JetBlue also flying between London and New York. The British flag carrier British Airways flies to over twenty destinations in the US. Also, the main British charter airline, TUI Airways, flies to the US, although principally to the holiday destinations of Florida and California. Both American Airlines and British Airways are founders of the airline alliance Oneworld. BA, TUI Airways, and Virgin Atlantic are major purchasers of American-made Boeing aircraft. Flying between the US and UK is at the moment in 2019 supported by the US-EU Open Skies Agreement, which came about in 2008, which allows any airline from either country to fly between each other.

John F. Kennedy International Airport in New York City is the most popular international destination for people flying out of Heathrow Airport. Over 2.8 million people on multiple daily non-stop flights flew from Heathrow to JFK in 2008. Concorde, British Airways' flagship supersonic airliner, began trans-Atlantic service to Washington Dulles International Airport in the United States on May 24, 1976. The trans-Atlantic route between London's Heathrow and New York's JFK, in under 3½ hours, had its first operational flight between the two hubs on October 19, 1977, and the last on October 23, 2003.

The two main American intercity bus carriers; Greyhound Lines and during the period from 1999 to 2019 Coach USA, plus their subsidiaries are each owned by a major British transportation company FirstGroup with Greyhound and Stagecoach with Coach USA. Coach USA's budget brand Megabus, which started in 2006, is a copycat of the British version of the discount coach company that started in 2003.

== State and official visits ==
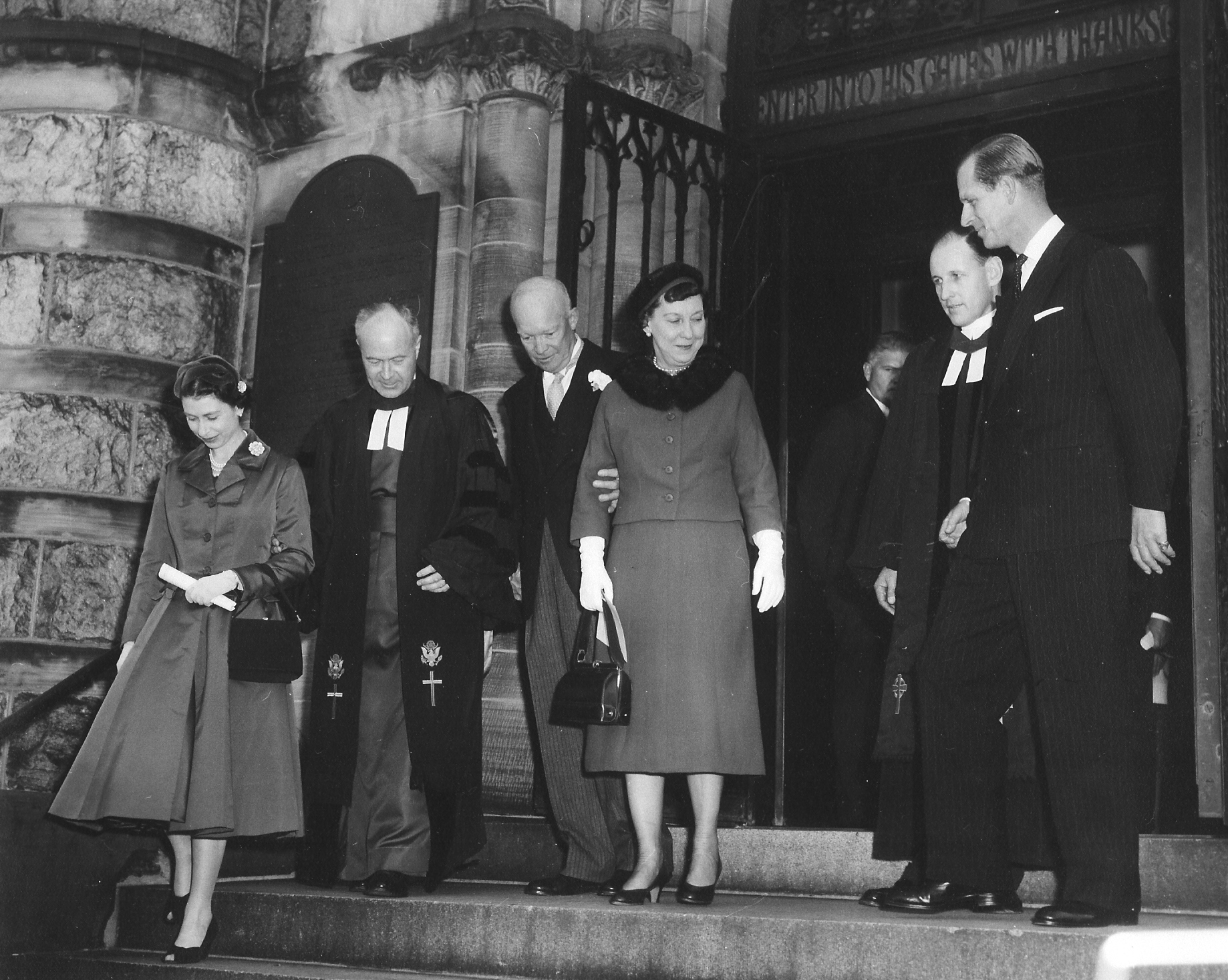
Queen Elizabeth II and Prince Philip after attending a worship service at National Presbyterian Church with US President Dwight Eisenhower and First Lady Mamie Eisenhower in 1957.

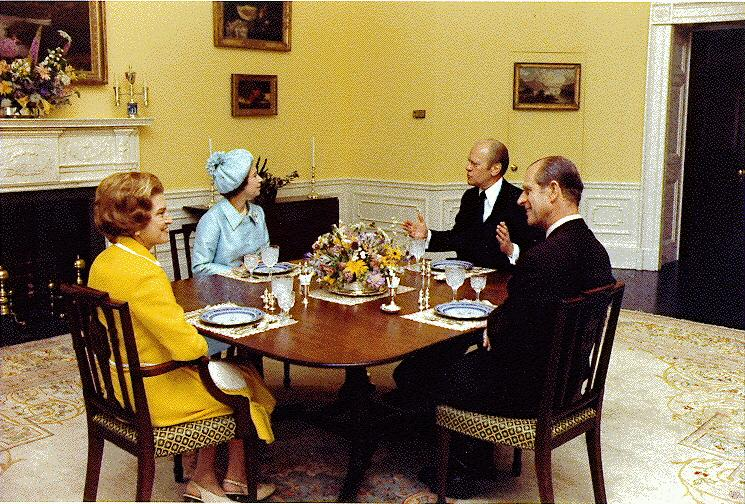
President Gerald Ford and First Lady Betty Ford host a lunch for Queen Elizabeth II and Prince Philip, Duke of Edinburgh in the President's Dining Room at the White House during Her Majesty's state visit to Washington that coincided with the United States Bicentennial celebrations in 1976.

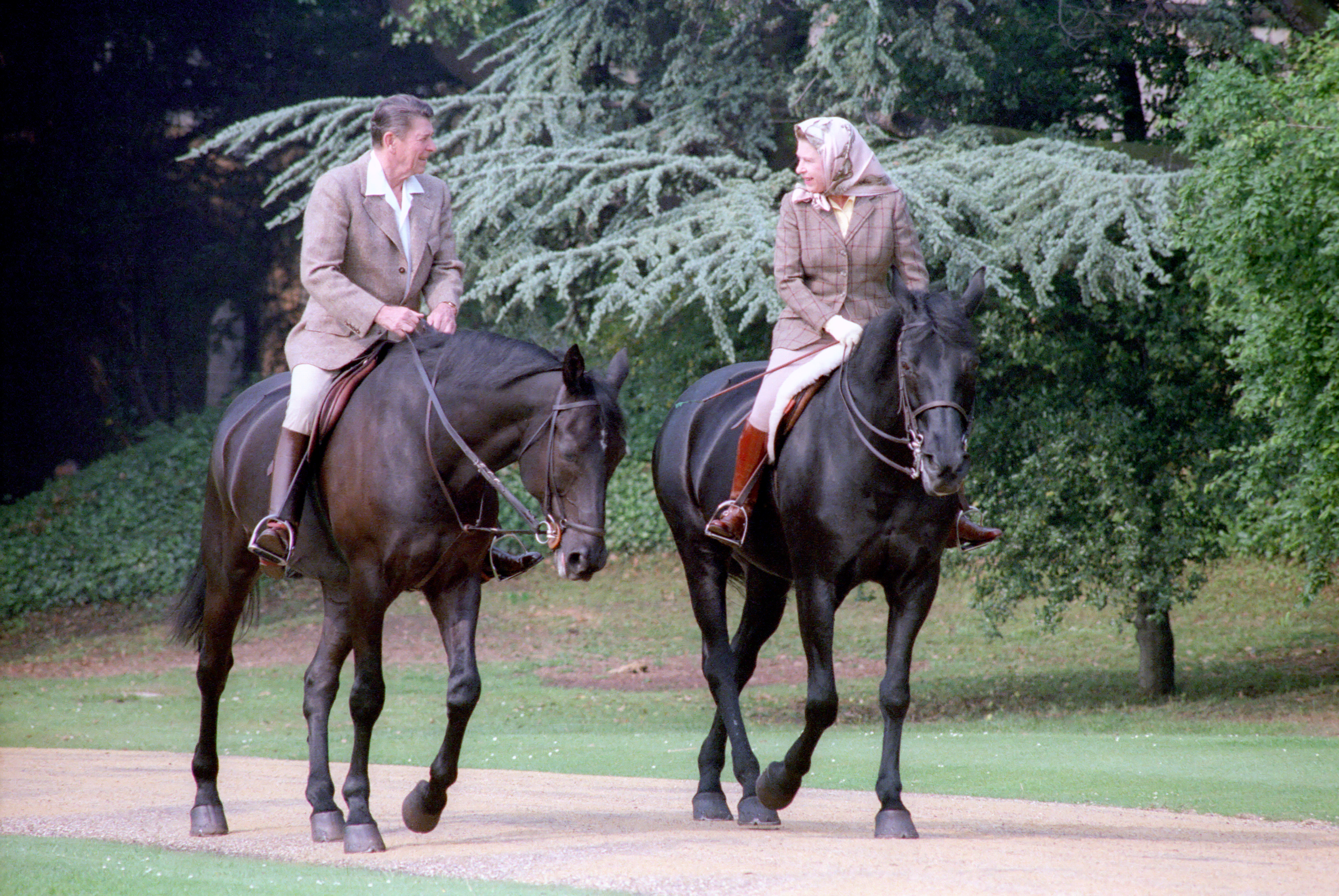
Queen Elizabeth II and US President Ronald Reagan in Windsor Great Park during President Reagan's 1982 official visit.

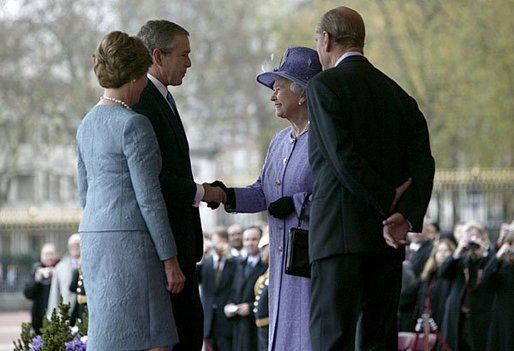
Queen Elizabeth II and Prince Philip, Duke of Edinburgh greet President George W. Bush and First Lady Laura Bush at Buckingham Palace during the American state visit to London in 2003.

In the 20th century, there were 78 formal and informal summits bringing together the president and the prime minister to deal with an agreed-upon agenda. The first was in 1918, the second in 1929. The rest began in 1941, which marked the decline of ambassadors as the key transmitters of policy discussions. In three out of four of the summits, the British delegation traveled to America. Summits have become much less important in the 21st century, with its new communication modes.

State visits involving the head of state have been made over the years by four presidents and two monarchs. Queen Elizabeth II met all the presidents from Harry Truman to Joe Biden (The Queen did not meet Lyndon Johnson during his presidency, (Note: Queen Elizabeth II and Johnson had arranged for a private meeting at Buckingham Palace during Churchill's funeral, but it was taken away when his doctors advised him against leading the US delegation to the funeral.) but Johnson attended the state dinner hosted by Dwight Eisenhower at the White House for the Queen on her state visit to the United States on October 17, 1957, as Senate Majority Leader.). In addition, the Queen made three private visits in 1984, 1985, and 1991 to see stallion stations and stud farms.

State and official visits to the United States by the British monarch
Dates	Guests	Hosts	Locations	Itinerary
June 7–11, 1939	King George VI and Queen Elizabeth	Franklin D. Roosevelt and Eleanor Roosevelt	Washington, D.C., New York City, and Hyde Park	Paid a state visit to Washington, D.C., stayed at the White House, laid a wreath at the Tomb of the Unknowns in Arlington National Cemetery, visited George Washington's former residence at Mount Vernon, made an appearance at the 1939 World's Fair in New York City, and made a private visit to Franklin Roosevelt's Springwood Estate in New York state.
October 17–20, 1957	Queen Elizabeth II and Prince Philip, Duke of Edinburgh	Dwight D. Eisenhower and Mamie Eisenhower	Jamestown and Williamsburg, Washington, DC, and New York City	Paid a state visit to Washington, DC, attended the official ceremonies of the 350th anniversary of the settlement of Jamestown, Virginia, and made a brief stopover in New York City to address the United Nations General Assembly before sailing to the United Kingdom. Lyndon B. Johnson attended the state dinner at the White House as Senate Majority Leader on October 17, 1957, which might be the only occasion on which he ever met the Queen.
July 6–9, 1976	Queen Elizabeth II and Prince Philip, Duke of Edinburgh	Gerald Ford and Betty Ford	Philadelphia, Washington, DC, New York City, Charlottesville, Virginia, Newport, Rhode Island, Providence, Rhode Island, and Boston	Paid a state visit to Washington, DC, and toured the United States East Coast in conjunction with the United States Bicentennial celebrations aboard HMY Britannia.
February 26 – March 7, 1983	Queen Elizabeth II and Prince Philip, Duke of Edinburgh	Ronald Reagan and Nancy Reagan	San Diego, Palm Springs, California, Los Angeles, Santa Barbara, California, San Francisco, Yosemite National Park in California, and Seattle	Made an official visit to the United States, toured the United States West Coast aboard HMY Britannia, and made a private visit to Ronald Reagan's retreat, Rancho del Cielo, in the Santa Ynez Mountains.
May 14–17, 1991	Queen Elizabeth II and Prince Philip, Duke of Edinburgh	George H. W. Bush and Barbara Bush	Washington, DC, Baltimore, Miami, Tampa, Florida, Austin, Texas, San Antonio, Houston, and Lexington, Kentucky	Paid a state visit to Washington, DC, addressed a joint session of the United States Congress, made a private visit to Kentucky, and toured the Southern United States and visited the Lyndon Baines Johnson Library and Museum and met Lady Bird Johnson and family.
May 3–8, 2007	Queen Elizabeth II and Prince Philip, Duke of Edinburgh	George W. Bush and Laura Bush	Richmond, Virginia, Jamestown, and Williamsburg (Virginia), Louisville, Kentucky, Greenbelt, Maryland, and Washington, DC	Paid a state visit to Washington, DC, addressed the Virginia General Assembly, attended the official ceremonies of the 400th anniversary of the establishment of Jamestown, toured NASA's Goddard Space Flight Center, visited the National World War II Memorial on the National Mall, and made a private visit to Kentucky to attend the 133rd Kentucky Derby.
July 6, 2010	Queen Elizabeth II and Prince Philip, Duke of Edinburgh	-	New York City	Made a one-day official visit to the United States to address the United Nations General Assembly, visited the World Trade Center site to pay respects to the victims of the September 11 attacks, and paid homage to British victims of the terrorist attack at the Queen Elizabeth September 11 Garden in Hanover Square.
April 27–30, 2026	King Charles III and Queen Camilla	Donald Trump and Melania Trump	Washington, DC, New York City and Virginia	Paid a state visit to Washington, DC and addressed a joint session of the United States Congress. The visit coincided with the United States Semiquincentennial, marking the 250th anniversary of the Declaration of Independence.

State and official visits to the United Kingdom by the president of the United States
Dates	Guests	Hosts	Locations	Itinerary
December 26–28, 1918	Woodrow Wilson and Edith Wilson	King George V and Queen Mary	London, Carlisle, and Manchester	Paid an official visit to the United Kingdom, stayed at Buckingham Palace, attended an official dinner, had an audience with King George V and Queen Mary, and made a private visit, called the pilgrimage of the heart, to the ancestral home of his British-born mother, Janet Woodrow.
June 7–9, 1982	Ronald Reagan and Nancy Reagan	Queen Elizabeth II and Prince Philip, Duke of Edinburgh	London and Windsor	Paid an official visit to the United Kingdom, stayed at Windsor Castle, attended a state banquet, and addressed Parliament.
November 28 – December 1, 1995	Bill Clinton and Hillary Clinton	Queen Elizabeth II and Prince Philip, Duke of Edinburgh	London, Belfast, and Derry	Paid an official visit to the United Kingdom, laid a wreath on the Tomb of The Unknown Warrior in Westminster Abbey, and addressed Parliament.
November 18–21, 2003	George W. Bush and Laura Bush	Queen Elizabeth II and Prince Philip, Duke of Edinburgh	London and Sedgefield	Paid a state visit to the United Kingdom, stayed at Buckingham Palace, attended a state banquet, laid a wreath on the Tomb of The Unknown Warrior in Westminster Abbey, and made a private visit to Tony Blair's constituency in County Durham.
May 24–26, 2011	Barack Obama and Michelle Obama	Queen Elizabeth II and Prince Philip, Duke of Edinburgh	London	Paid a state visit to the United Kingdom, stayed at Buckingham Palace, welcomed during an arrival ceremony in Buckingham Palace Gardens, attended a state banquet, laid a wreath on the Tomb of the Unknown Warrior, addressed Parliament, presented wedding gifts to Prince William, Duke of Cambridge and Catherine, Duchess of Cambridge, donated a MacBook notebook computers to Peace Players International, met with Queen Elizabeth II, Prince Philip, and Prime Minister David Cameron.
June 3–5, 2019	Donald Trump and Melania Trump	Queen Elizabeth II	London and Portsmouth	Paid a state visit to the United Kingdom, stayed at the Winfield House, welcomed during an arrival ceremony in Buckingham Palace Gardens, attended a state banquet, laid a wreath on the Tomb of the Unknown Warrior in Westminster Abbey, met with Queen Elizabeth II and Prime Minister Theresa May.
September 16–18, 2025	Donald Trump and Melania Trump	King Charles III and Queen Camilla	London and Windsor	Paid a state visit to the United Kingdom, stayed at Windsor Castle, attended a state banquet, and met with King Charles III and Prime Minister Keir Starmer.

== Resident diplomatic missions ==
of the United Kingdom

- Washington, D.C. (Embassy)
- Atlanta (Consulate-General)
- Boston (Consulate-General)
- Chicago (Consulate-General)
- Houston (Consulate-General)
- Los Angeles (Consulate-General)
- Miami (Consulate-General)
- New York City (Consulate-General)
- San Francisco (Consulate-General)

of the United States

- London (Embassy)
- Belfast (Consulate General)
- Edinburgh (Consulate General)
- Hamilton, Bermuda (Consulate General)

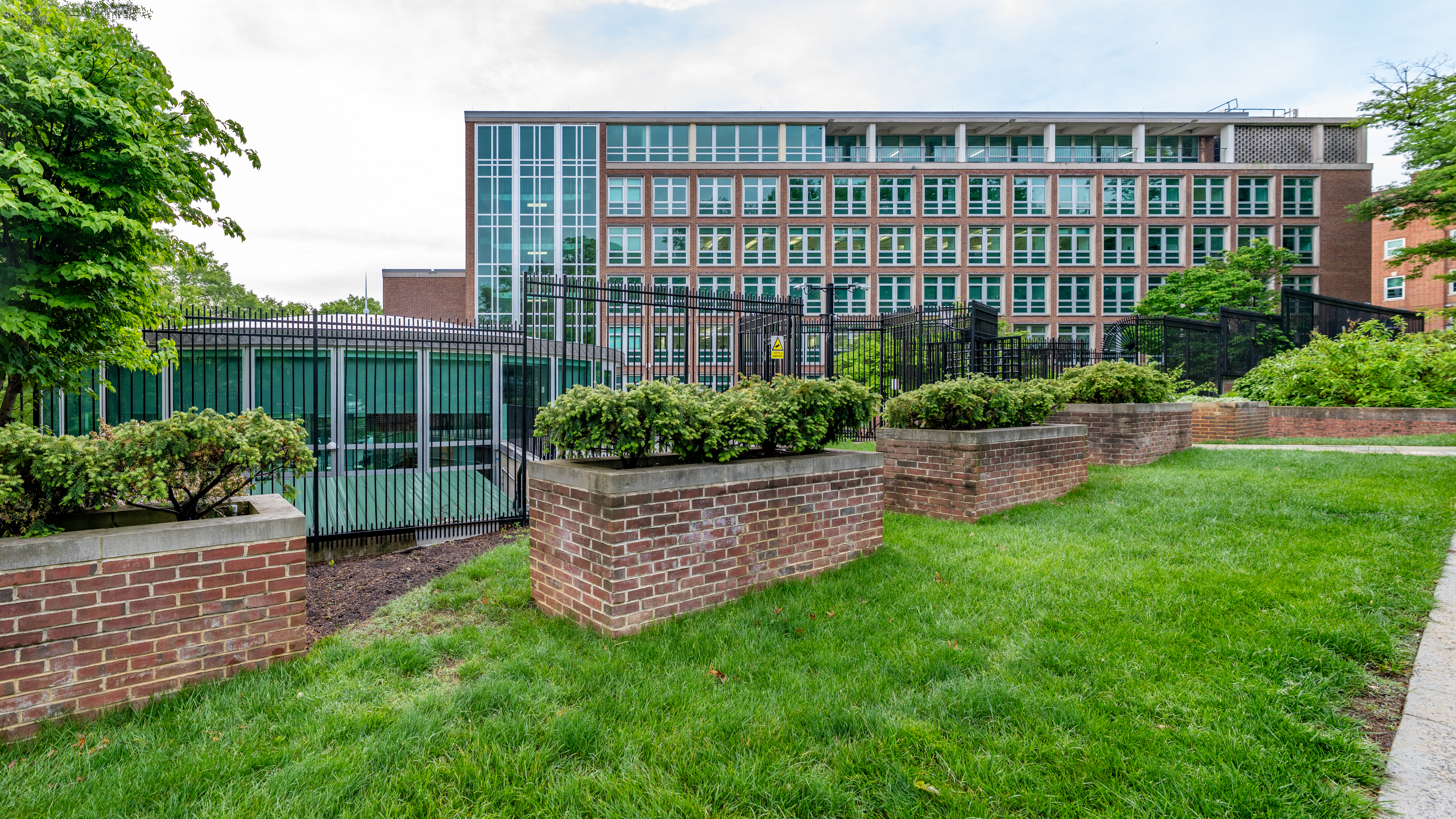
Embassy of the United Kingdom in Washington, D.C.

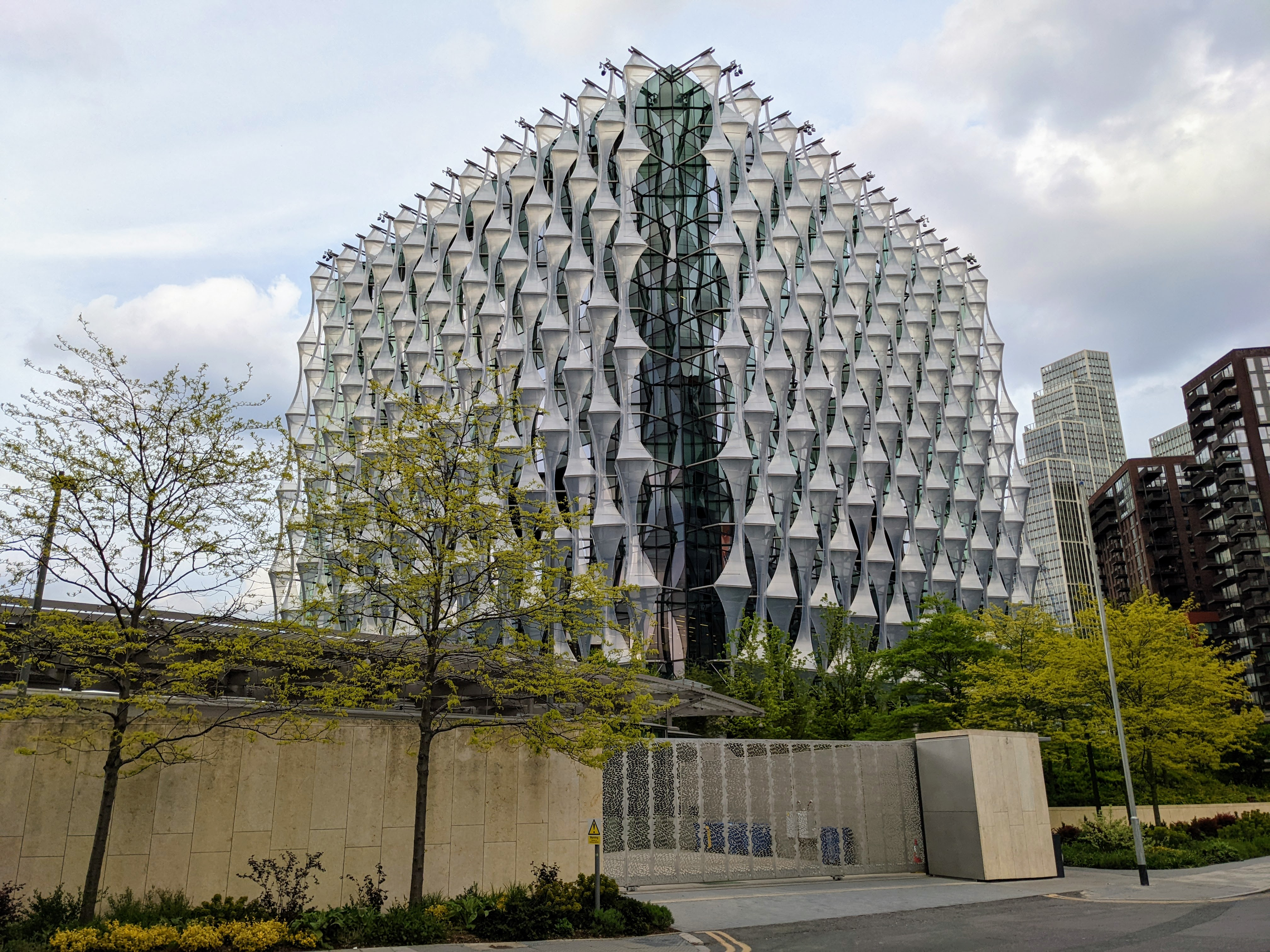
Embassy of the United States in London

== Common memberships ==
- Asian Development Bank
- AUKUS
- Australia Group
- Bank for International Settlements
- British-American Project
- European Bank for Reconstruction and Development
- Five Eyes
- Food and Agriculture Organization
- G7
- G10
- G20
- General Conference on Weights and Measures
- Inter-American Development Bank
- International Chamber of Commerce
- International Court of Justice
- International Electrotechnical Commission
- International Energy Agency
- International Monetary Fund
- International Olympic Committee
- International Renewable Energy Agency
- International Telecommunication Union
- Interpol
- North Atlantic Treaty Organization
- Nuclear Non-Proliferation Treaty
- Organisation for Economic Co-operation and Development
- Organization for Security and Co-operation in Europe
- Partnership for Atlantic Cooperation
- Paris Club
- Pilgrims Society
- Rim of the Pacific Exercise
- UKUSA Agreement
- United Nations
- United Nations Educational, Scientific and Cultural Organization
- United Nations Security Council
- Universal Postal Union
- World Bank
- World Health Organization
- World Trade Organization
- Zangger Committee

=== Strategic Alliance Cyber Crime Working Group ===
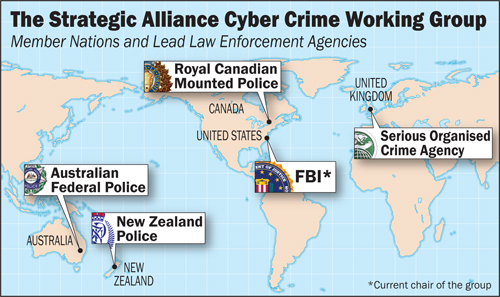
Map showing member countries of the Strategic Alliance Cyber Crime Working Group and their respective lead agencies. This map refers to Serious Organised Crime Agency; this body is now known as the National Crime Agency.

Map of the UKUSA Agreement countries: Australia, Canada, New Zealand, the United Kingdom, and the United States

The Strategic Alliance Cyber Crime Working Group is an initiative by Australia, Canada, New Zealand, the United Kingdom, and headed by the United States as a "formal partnership between these nations dedicated to tackling larger global crime issues, particularly organised crime". The cooperation consists of "five countries from three continents banding together to fight cyber crime synergistically by sharing intelligence, swapping tools and best practices, and strengthening and even synchronising their respective laws".

Within this initiative, there is increased information sharing between the United Kingdom's National Crime Agency and the United States' Federal Bureau of Investigation on matters relating to serious fraud or cyber crime.

=== UK–USA Security Agreement ===
The UK–USA Security Agreement is an alliance of five English-speaking countries: Australia, Canada, New Zealand, the United Kingdom, and the United States, for the sole purpose of sharing intelligence. The precursor to this agreement is essentially an extension of the historic BRUSA Agreement, which was signed in 1943. In association with the ECHELON system, all five nations are assigned to intelligence collection and analysis from different parts of the world. For example, the United Kingdom hunts for communications in Europe, Africa, and European Russia whereas the United States has responsibility for gathering intelligence in Latin America, Asia, Asiatic Russia, and northern mainland China.

== Sister-twinning cities ==
=== England and the United States ===
- (England) Ashby-de-la-Zouch and Evans, Colorado
- (England) Ashford and Hopewell, Virginia
- (England) Barnet, London and Barnet, Vermont
- (England) Barnet, London and Montclair, New Jersey
- (England) Barnstaple and Barnstable, Massachusetts
- (England) Belper and Pawtucket, Rhode Island
- (England) Berwick-upon-Tweed and Berwick, Pennsylvania
- (England) Billericay and Billerica, Massachusetts
- (England) Billericay and Fishers, Indiana
- (England) Birmingham and Chicago, Illinois
- (England) Bodmin and Grass Valley, California
- (England) Boston, Lincolnshire and Boston, Massachusetts
- (England) Brentwood and Brentwood, Tennessee
- (England) Burton upon Trent and Elkhart, Indiana
- (England) Bury and Woodbury, New Jersey
- (England) Calne and Caln Township, Pennsylvania
- (England) Canterbury and Bloomington, Illinois
- (England) Cheltenham and Cheltenham, Pennsylvania
- (England) Chester and Lakewood, Colorado
- (England) Cornwall and (New York (state)) Cornwall, New York
- (England) County Durham and Durham County, North Carolina
- (England) Coventry and Coventry, Connecticut
- (England) Coventry and (New York (state)) Coventry, New York
- (England) Coventry and Coventry, Rhode Island
- (England) Dalton-in-Furness and Dalton, Pennsylvania
- (England) Doncaster and Wilmington, North Carolina
- (England) Dover and Huber Heights, Ohio
- (England) Durham and Durham, North Carolina
- (England) Evesham and Evesham Township, New Jersey
- (England) Fleetwood and Fleetwood, Pennsylvania
- (England) Gravesend and Chesterfield, Virginia
- (England) Hartlepool and Muskegon, Michigan
- (England) Haverhill and Haverhill, Massachusetts
- (England) Haworth and Haworth, New Jersey
- (England) Hertford and Hartford, Connecticut
- (England) Hinckley and Midland, Ohio
- (England) Keighley and Myrtle Beach, South Carolina
- (England) Kettering and Kettering, Ohio
- (England) Kingston upon Hull and Raleigh, North Carolina
- (England) Leeds, City of and Louisville, Kentucky
- (England) Lincoln and Lincoln, Nebraska
- (England) Lambeth, London and (New York (state)) Brooklyn, New York
- (England) London and (New York (state)) New York City, New York
- (England) Manchester and Los Angeles, California
- (England) Mansfield and Mansfield, Massachusetts
- (England) Mansfield and Mansfield, Ohio
- (England) Newcastle upon Tyne and (Georgia (U.S. state)) Atlanta, Georgia
- (England) Newmarket and Lexington, Kentucky
- (England) Norfolk and Norfolk, Virginia
- (England) Northampton and Easton, Pennsylvania
- (England) Northampton and Northampton, Pennsylvania
- (England) Oakham and Dodgeville, Wisconsin
- (England) Oxford and Oxford, Michigan
- (England) Penzance and Nevada City, California
- (England) Plymouth and Plymouth, Massachusetts
- (England) Portsmouth and Portsmouth, New Hampshire
- (England) Reading and Reading, Pennsylvania
- (England) Redruth and Mineral Point, Wisconsin
- (England) Richmond, London and Richmond, Virginia
- (England) Rochester and (New York (state)) Rochester, New York
- (England) Rugeley and Western Springs, Illinois
- (England) Runnymede and Herndon, Virginia
- (England) Rye and Rye, New Hampshire
- (England) Salisbury and Salisbury, Maryland
- (England) Salisbury and Salisbury, North Carolina
- (England) Sefton, Metropolitan Borough of and Fort Lauderdale, Florida
- (England) Sheffield and Pittsburgh, Pennsylvania
- (England) Shrewsbury and Shrewsbury, Massachusetts
- (England) Southampton and Hampton, Virginia
- (England) Stafford and Stafford County, Virginia
- (England) Swindon and Chattanooga, Tennessee
- (England) Southwark, London and Cambridge, Massachusetts
- (England) Stourbridge and Sturbridge, Massachusetts
- (England) Stratford-upon-Avon and Stratford, Connecticut
- (England) Stroud and Stroud, Oklahoma
- (England) Sunderland and (Washington, D.C.) Washington, D.C.
- (England) Taunton and Taunton, Massachusetts
- (England) Truro and Truro, Massachusetts
- (England) Warrington and Lake County, Illinois
- (England) Warwick and (New York (state)) Warwick, New York
- (England) Warwick and Warwick, Rhode Island
- (England) Watford and Wilmington, Delaware
- (England) Whitby and Anchorage, Alaska
- (England) Whitby and Waimea, Hawaii
- (England) Winchester and Winchester, Virginia
- (England) Wirral, Metropolitan Borough of and Midland, Texas
- (England) Wolverhampton and (New York (state)) Buffalo, New York
- (England) Worcester and Worcester, Massachusetts

=== Scotland and the United States ===
- (Scotland) Aberdeen and (Washington (state)) Aberdeen, Washington
- (Scotland) Aberdeen and Houston, Texas
- (Scotland) Blairgowrie and Pleasanton, California
- (Scotland) Dundee and Alexandria, Virginia
- (Scotland) Dunfermline and Sarasota, Florida
- (Scotland) Edinburgh and San Diego, California
- (Scotland) Inverness and Inverness, Florida
- (Scotland) Livingston and Grapevine, Texas
- (Scotland) Midlothian and Midlothian, Illinois
- (Scotland) Prestwick and Vandalia, Ohio
- (Scotland) Stirling and Dunedin, Florida
- (Scotland) Stornoway and Pendleton, South Carolina
- (Scotland) Dull, Perth and Kinross and Boring, Oregon
- (Scotland) Birnam and (North Carolina) Asheville
- (Scotland) Dumfries and Annapolis, Maryland
- (Scotland) Dunbar and Martinez, California
- (Scotland) Dunkeld and Asheville, North Carolina
- (Scotland) Falkirk and San Rafael, California
- (Scotland) Forres and Mount Dora, Florida
- (Scotland) Glasgow and (Pennsylvania) Pittsburgh
- (Scotland) Grangemouth and La Porte, Indiana
- (Scotland) Kelso, Scottish Borders and (Washington (state)) Kelso, Washington
- (Scotland) Oban and Laurinburg, North Carolina
- (Scotland) South Ayrshire and (Georgia (U.S. state)) Newnan, Georgia
- (Scotland) Stonehaven and Athens, Alabama
- (Scotland) Stornoway and Pendleton, South Carolina
- (Scotland) Linlithgow and Grapevine, Texas

=== Wales and the United States ===
- (Wales) Brecon and Saline, Michigan
- (Wales) Machynlleth and Belleville, Michigan
- (Wales) Nantyglo and Nanty Glo, Pennsylvania
- (Wales) Newport, Pembrokeshire, and Annapolis, Maryland

=== Northern Ireland and the United States ===
- (Northern Ireland) Ballymena and Morehead, Kentucky
- (Northern Ireland) Bangor, County Down and Virginia Beach, Virginia
- (Northern Ireland) Belfast and Belfast, Maine
- (Northern Ireland) Belfast and Boston, Massachusetts
- (Northern Ireland) Belfast and Nashville, Tennessee
- (Northern Ireland) Carrickfergus and Anderson, South Carolina
- (Northern Ireland) Carrickfergus and Jackson, Michigan
- (Northern Ireland) Castlereagh and (Washington (state)) Kent, Washington
- (Northern Ireland) Craigavon and (Georgia (U.S. state)) LaGrange, Georgia
- (Northern Ireland) Derry and (New York (state)) Buffalo, New York
- (Northern Ireland) Killyleagh and Cleveland, North Carolina
- (Northern Ireland) Larne and Clover, South Carolina
- (Northern Ireland) Newtownabbey and Gilbert, Arizona

=== British Crown Dependencies and the United States ===
- Saint Helier, Jersey and Trenton, New Jersey

=== Friendship links ===
- (England) Cambridge and Cambridge, Massachusetts
- (England) Liverpool and Memphis, Tennessee
- (England) Liverpool and New Orleans, Louisiana
- (England) Newcastle upon Tyne and Little Rock, Arkansas
- (England) Wellingborough and Willingboro, New Jersey

== Heritage ==
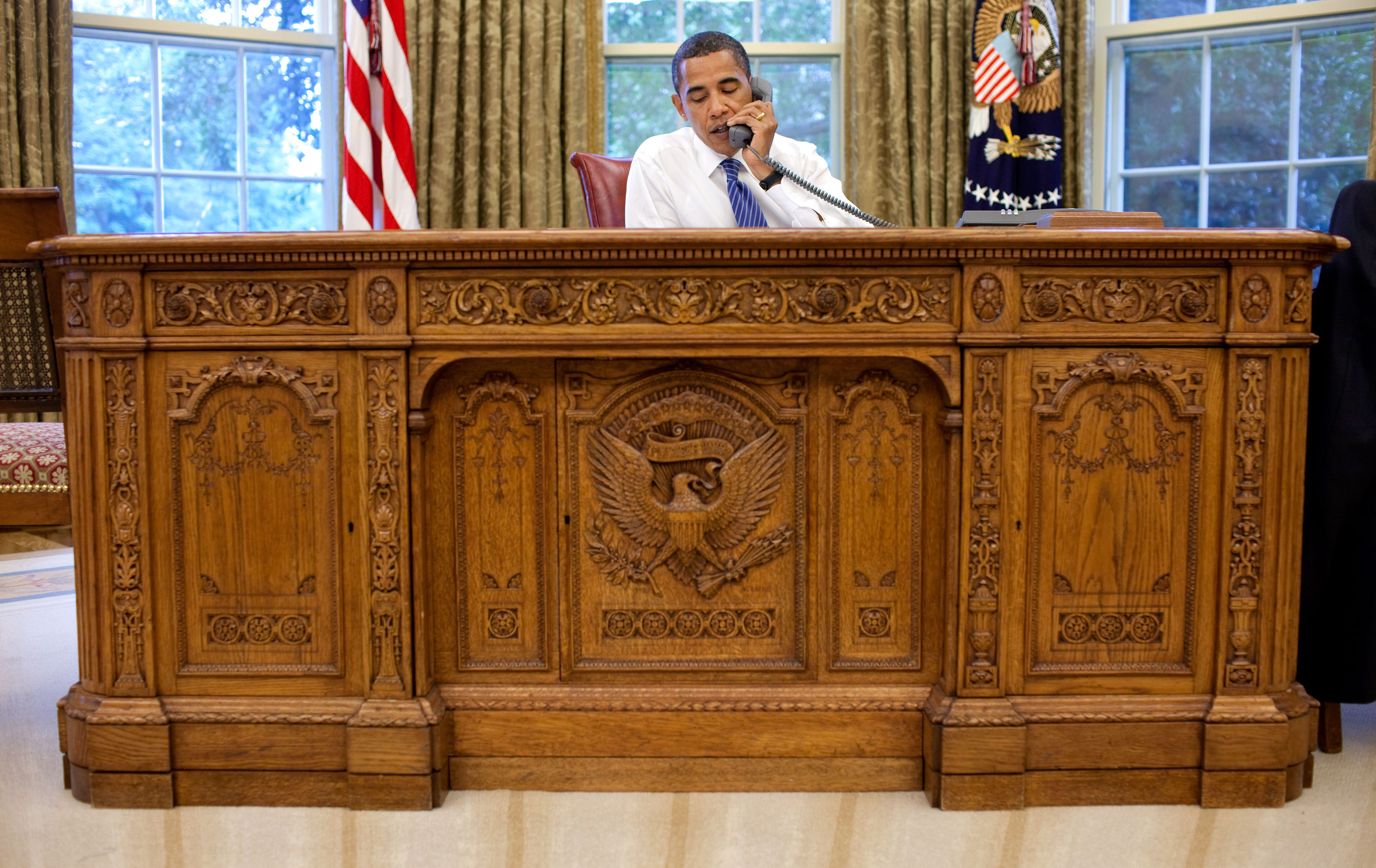
Barack Obama sitting at the Resolute desk, which was handcrafted from barque timbers of the decommissioned HMS Resolute, and then presented by Queen Victoria as a gift to the United States on November 23, 1880

The United States and Britain share many threads of cultural heritage.

Since English is the main language of both the British and the Americans, both nations belong to the English-speaking world. Their common language comes with (relatively minor) differences in spelling, pronunciation, and the meaning of words.

The American legal system is largely based on English common law. The American system of local government is rooted in English precedents, such as the offices of county courts and sheriffs. Although the US remains more highly religious than Britain, the largest Protestant denominations emerged from British churches brought across the Atlantic, such as the Baptists, Methodists, Congregationalists and Episcopalians. Britain and the United States practice what is commonly referred to as an Anglo-Saxon economy in which levels of regulation and taxes are relatively low, and the government provides a low to medium level of social services in return. Independence Day, July 4, is a national celebration that commemorates the July 4, 1776, adoption of the Declaration of Independence from the British Empire. American defiance of Britain is expressed in the American national anthem, "The Star-Spangled Banner", written during the War of 1812 to the tune of a British celebratory song as the Americans beat off a British attack on Baltimore.

It is estimated that between 40.2 million and 72.1 million Americans today have British ancestry, i.e., between 13% and 23.3% of the US population. In the 1980 US census, 61,311,449 Americans reported British ancestry reaching 32.56% of the US population at the time which, even today, would make them the largest ancestry group in the United States.

Particular symbols of the close relationship between the two countries are the JFK Memorial and the American Bar Association's Magna Carta Memorial, both at Runnymede in England.

== Religion ==
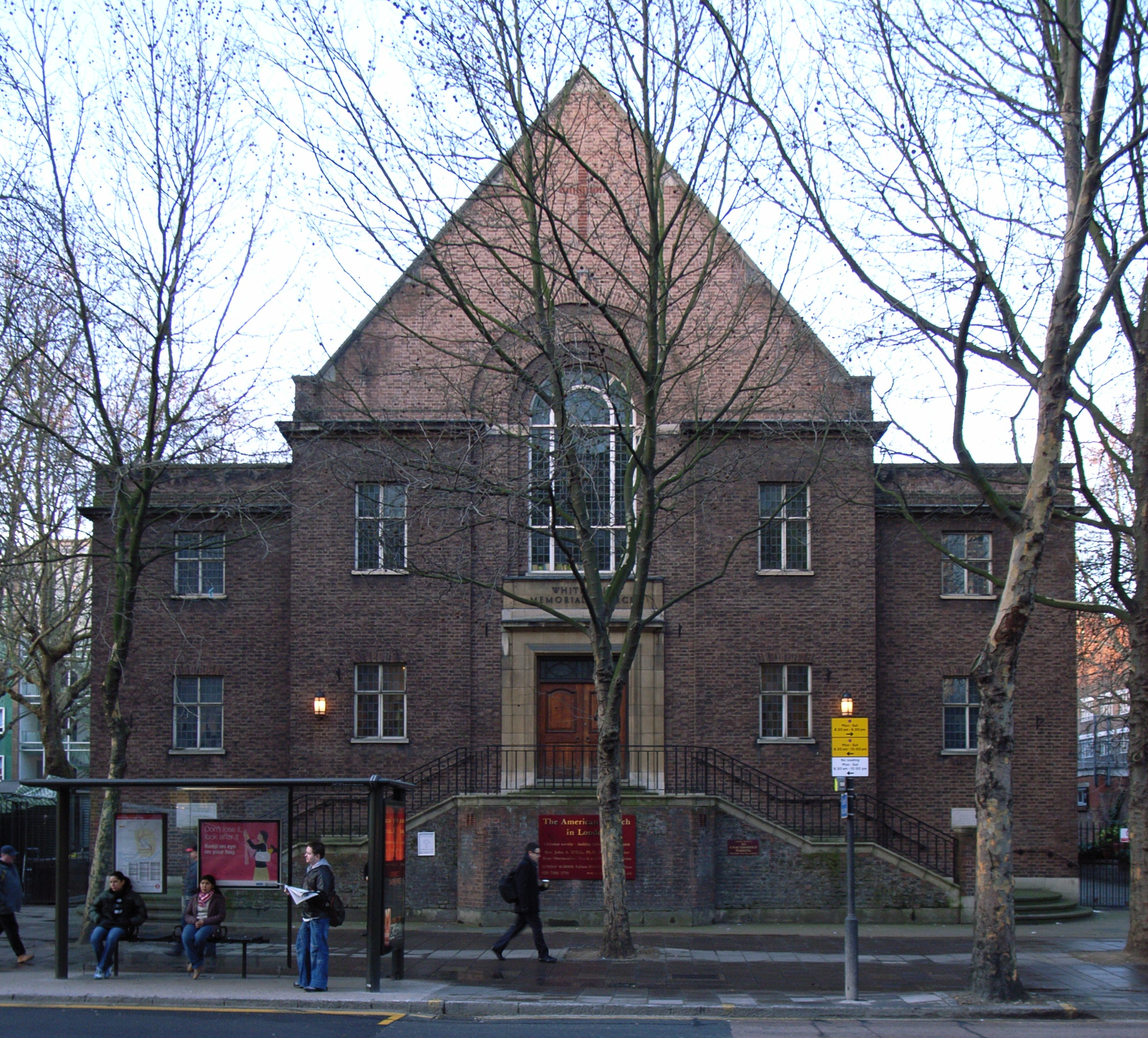
Whitfield Memorial Church in the Camden section of London, which is home to the American International Church

Both the United States and the United Kingdom share the similarity that a majority of their populations state that their belief is Christian, at 70.4% in the US and 59.5% in the UK. Also, in both countries, the majority of Christian followers are members of the Mainline Protestant group of churches, rather than the Roman Catholic Church, although the Catholic church is relatively sizeable in both countries. Many of these mainline Protestant churches in the United States have their origins in the United Kingdom, or their founders were British. This includes Episcopal (Anglican), Baptist, Methodist, Presbyterian, Congregational, and Quaker.

Nevertheless, there are three big disparities between the two nations in the role of religion and faith. Firstly, the United Kingdom has an established church in two of the four nations of the country; the Anglican Church of England, where the head of state is the head of the church in one, and the Presbyterian Church of Scotland which plays a notable role of the other. The United States, on the other hand, requires a strict separation of church and state, as stated in the First Amendment. Another sizable difference between the US and the UK is the piety of followers, as the UK is much more secular than the US. A Gallup poll in 2015 reported that 41% of Americans said they regularly attend religious services, compared to just 10% of Britons. Thirdly, a preeminent distinction between the two countries is the declaration of faith. In the United Kingdom, religion, especially those who follow the mainstream Protestant churches, is rarely discussed, and the country is a secular society. However, in the US, religion and faith are seen as a major part of the personal being, and declarations are much stronger.

The United Kingdom also has a large number of those possessing no faith or are agnostic with 25.7% saying they are irreligious, compared with just 10% in the United States who say that they don't believe in a God. Many notable British atheists, including Richard Dawkins and Christopher Hitchens, are known in the US. The Atheist Bus campaign, which started in London in 2008 by Ariane Sherine, was copied by local atheists in America and put on buses in Washington, DC, and Bloomington, Indiana.

The differing attitudes towards religion between the US and the UK cause a large schism between the two nations, and much of the general attitude of the society as a whole on fundamental social issues, including abortion, minority rights, blasphemy, the role of church and the state in society, etc. Both the United States and the United Kingdom share several followers of other minority faiths, although the numbers and type of faith practice in both countries differ wildly due to the ethnic and cultural makeup of both countries. The other minority faiths that are practiced in both countries include Judaism, Islam, Hinduism, Sikhism, Paganism and Buddhism.

== Food and drink ==
Many classic dishes or foods from American cuisine such as hamburgers, hot dogs, barbecue chicken, New York Pizza, deep-pan pizza, chewing gum, tomato soup, chilli-con-carne, chocolate chip cookies, chocolate brownies, soft-scoop ice cream and donuts are popular in the United Kingdom. Drinks like cola, milkshakes and bourbon are also popular. Several major American food trends and fads have also been popular and influential in the British palate, for example, weight management diets and craft beer.

Some American foods, like cornflakes, baked beans, and crisps (known as potato chips in the United States), have become so entrenched in the UK's food culture that they have completely lost their American roots and are considered part of British cuisine. Breakfast cereals like corn flakes, bran flakes and puffed rice came from the US to the UK in the beginning of twentieth century, and virtually changed the perception of breakfasts locally.

Some British foods have been just as popular in the US, such as apple pie, macaroni and cheese, and sandwich. British cuisine was a major influence on the cuisine of the Southern United States, including fried chicken. British foods like fish and chips, shepherd's pie, Sunday Roast, Beef Steak, Steak Diane, Afternoon Tea and gingerbread are also entrenched in American food culture. Drinking culture in the US has been heavily influenced by Britain, especially the introduction of whisky and certain styles of beer in the colonial period. By the late 20th Century, British cuisine was sometimes stereotyped as being unappealing in the United States, although British cuisine is commonly eaten there. This reputation has been attributed to the impact that WWII rationing had on British cuisine in the mid-20th Century.

Many major American food and fast moving consumer goods companies have British operations including Molson Coors, McCormick & Company, Kellogg's, Campbell's, Kraft-Heinz, PepsiCo, Coca-Cola & Mondelez The major British food manufacturers that operate in the United States are Unilever, Associated British Foods and Diageo. The purchase of the British food company Cadbury by the American company Kraft Foods in 2010, caused a storm on whether the company would change the recipe for its signature chocolate and the conditions at Cadbury's food factories.

Additionally, there are several American restaurant and café chains like McDonald's, Burger King, KFC, Domino's Pizza, Pizza Hut, Krispy Kreme, and Starbucks that have enterprises on the other side of the Atlantic. A small number of British chains like Pret a Manger, YO! Sushi and Itsu have operations in the US, principally around New York City. The British catering company Compass Group has several catering contracts in the States, including for the federal government and the US military. During the start of 2020, YouTube channel Insider asked their resident American and British journalists Joe Avella and Harry Kersh to compare various chain restaurant menus of both the US and UK, under the title of Food Wars.

Since the 2016 EU referendum, there has been growing concern about whether a possible UK–US free trade agreement would lead to changes in food practices and laws in the UK. The concern is that American food standards laws are much looser than the UK's, such as rules governing cleanliness, the use of antibiotics and pesticides, animal welfare conditions and the use of genetically modified food. Many of these concerns have been symbolised by the production process of American poultry, often known as "chlorinated chicken".

== Culture and media ==
Both the US and UK are considered cultural superpowers; both countries have a large-scale influence around the world in film, music, literature, and television.

=== Literature ===
Literature is transferred across the Atlantic Ocean, as evidenced by the appeal of British authors such as William Shakespeare, Charles Dickens, J. R. R. Tolkien, Jackie Collins, and J. K. Rowling in the United States, and American authors including Harriet Beecher Stowe, Mark Twain, Ernest Hemingway, Stephen King, and Dan Brown in Britain. Henry James and T. S. Eliot both moved to Britain and were well known in both countries. Eliot moved to England in 1914 and became a British subject in 1927. He was a dominant figure in literary criticism and greatly influenced the Modern period of British literature.

In the UK, many American novels including The Catcher in the Rye, Roll of Thunder, Hear My Cry, Of Mice and Men, and The Color Purple are frequently used texts for British secondary-level education English and English Literature exams as set by the main examination boards.

=== Media ===
In the media, connections between the US and the UK in print media are minor but strong in online content. Until 2016, a condensed version of The New York Times was inside The Observer newspaper. In some newsagents in the UK, people can find international editions of USA Today, The New York Times International Edition, (Note: Although the paper is edited in Paris, it is effectively a version of the New York paper.) the Europe edition of Time, Newsweek, The New Yorker, New York magazine and Foreign Affairs. While in the US you would be able to find the international edition of The Economist and in New York City, the Financial Times. After Rupert Murdoch purchases the New York Post in November 1976, he redesigned the newspaper into a populist right-wing tabloid, likewise his earlier relaunch of the British Sun newspaper as a down-market tabloid from 1969.

In magazine publishing, the two large American magazine publishing houses, Hearst and Condé Nast, maintain operations in the UK, and British editions of the US magazines Good Housekeeping, GQ, Men's Health, Cosmopolitan, Vogue, National Geographic, Wired and others are available in Britain. On occasion, some American editions are also available for purchase, usually next to the local edition or in the international section. In British magazines in the US, Northern & Shell created an American version of OK! magazine in 2005.

There are several Americans and British in each other's countries' press corp, including editors, correspondents, journalists, and columnists. Individuals born in the United States active in the British press corp include the FT's news editor Peter Spiegel, Daily Telegraph columnist Janet Daley, The Times columnist Hadley Freeman and the Guardian columnist Tim Dowling and. Originally from the UK were Christopher Hitchens (1949–2011) and the current editor of Vogue, Anna Wintour. The previous CEO of The New York Times Company between 2012 and 2020 was the former Director-General of the BBC (effectively a CEO), Mark Thompson. The current editor-in-chief of the London-based Guardian since 2015, Katharine Viner was previously the editor of The Guardian's American website between 2014 and 2015.

In terms of online content, three newspaper-online sites have American editions, TheGuardian.com, Mail Online and The Independent. BBC News Online is a frequently visited by Americans. The American online news sites BuzzFeed, Breitbart News and HuffPost (formerly The Huffington Post) all previously possess British-based editions before shutting them down.

=== Film ===
There is much crossover appeal in the modern entertainment culture of the United Kingdom and the United States. For example, Hollywood blockbuster movies made by Steven Spielberg and George Lucas have had a large effect on British audiences in the United Kingdom, while the James Bond and Harry Potter series of films have attracted high interest in the United States. Also, the animated films of Walt Disney as well as those of Pixar, DreamWorks, Don Bluth, Blue Sky, Illumination and others have continued to make an indelible mark and impression on British audiences, young and old, for almost 100 years. Films by Alfred Hitchcock continuously make a lasting impact on a loyal fan base in the United States, as Alfred Hitchcock himself influenced notable American filmmakers such as John Carpenter in the horror and slasher film genres. Production of films is often shared between the two nations, whether it be a concentrated use of British and American actors or the use of film studios located in London or Hollywood.

=== Theatre ===
Broadway theatre in New York City has toured London's West End theatre over the years, with notable performances such as The Lion King, Grease, Wicked, and Rent. British productions, such as Mamma Mia! and several of Andrew Lloyd Webber's musicals, including Joseph and the Amazing Technicolor Dreamcoat, Cats and The Phantom of the Opera have found success on Broadway. For over 150 years, Shakespeare's plays have been overwhelmingly popular with upscale American audiences.

=== Television ===
Both the United Kingdom and the United States have similar television shows, as they are either carried by the other nation's networks or are re-created for distribution in their own nations. Some popular British television programmes that were re-created for the American market in more recent years include House of Cards, The Office, Pop Idol (American Idol), Strictly Come Dancing (Dancing with the Stars), Top Gear, Who Wants to Be a Millionaire?, Weakest Link and The X Factor. Some American television shows re-created for the British market in more recent years include The Apprentice and Deal or No Deal. Many American television shows have been popular in the United Kingdom.

The BBC airs two networks in the United States, BBC America and BBC World News. The American network PBS collaborates with the BBC and rebroadcasts British television shows in the United States such as Doctor Who, Keeping Up Appearances, Masterpiece Theatre, Monty Python's Flying Circus, Nova. The BBC also frequently collaborates with American network HBO, showing recent American mini-series in the United Kingdom such as Band of Brothers, The Gathering Storm, John Adams, and Rome. Likewise, the American network Discovery Channel has partnered with the BBC by televising recent British mini-series in the United States such as Planet Earth and The Blue Planet, the latter popularly known as The Blue Planet: Seas of Life in the American format. The United States' public affairs channel C-SPAN, broadcasts Prime Minister's Questions every Sunday.

On some British digital television platforms, it is also possible to watch American television channels that are tailored for British audiences such as CNBC Europe, CNN International, ESPN Classic, Comedy Central, PBS America and Fox. The Super Bowl, the National Football League's championship tournament of American football, which occurs every February, has been broadcast in the United Kingdom since 1982. Conversely, the Premier League has been shown on NBC Sports Network in the United States. Until 2017, Formula One television coverage in the United States has used an American-based team but the announcers are British; from 2018 Sky Sports has taken over Formula One coverage through ESPN2.

=== Radio ===
Compared to music and television broadcasting, radio broadcasting is limited to both sides of the pond. There are several reasons for this. The major one is that the majority of radio broadcasting in the United States is commercial and funded by advertising and the small network of public radio stations are supported by donations, compared to the United Kingdom where the national public broadcaster, the BBC is the major player which funded by the obligatory television licence. This leads to a completely different structure of the number and type of radio stations and their broadcasting schedules.

Other factors include differing technical standards of radio broadcasting. This is influenced by their countries' broadcasting authorities, which shape over-the-air radio. In the UK, it is influenced by the authorities of Ofcom and the EBU, which are working towards DAB and DRM. While in the United States, it is influenced by the FCC, which is working towards HD Radio. The British international broadcasting station, the BBC World Service is syndicated on various major city public radio stations in the United States such as WNYC, and on SiriusXM satellite radio, through the broadcaster American Public Media. The American international broadcaster, Voice of America has no remit in be needed to be heard in the UK, so it doesn't broadcast there and none of its programmes is relayed on domestic stations. In a resource-saving exercise between the two international broadcasters, Voice of America shares its transmission towers with the BBC World Service to help with shortwave transmissions in remote areas.

Internet radio and streaming services are growing in popularity in both countries; however, listening to each other's feeds is hampered by the countries' broadcasting rights. This causes the internet radio feeds of American and British radio stations to be sometimes blocked or on restricted bandwidth. For example, BBC Radio 2 is on a 128 kbit/s AAC domestic stream, while internationally it's on a 48 kbit/s AAC+ stream. However, both the American and the British international broadcasters, Voice of America and the BBC World Service, are fully accessible online in each other's countries. Streaming services that are popular in both countries include the American TuneIn, Apple Music, and Swedish-owned Spotify. The other major services in the US, like Pandora Radio and Radio.com, don't operate in the UK, and are inaccessible.

In the past, before the Second World War, connections between the United States and the United Kingdom in the radio industry were virtually unheard of. Radio in the UK was not influenced by the US, due to the vast distance, and the only regular services that were heard were the BBC and the "pirate" station Radio Luxembourg. When the Americans joined the war as part of the Allies, some soldiers were billeted in the UK, in the BBC provided programming for these people. So the Forces Programme, broadcast many popular American variety shows such as Charlie McCarthy, The Bob Hope Show, and The Jack Benny Program. As the Forces Programme, and the subsequent General Forces Programme, was easily available for civilians, they were also heard by domestic audiences. After the War in 1946 on the Home Service, the BBC started to broadcast the factual programme Letter from America, which was presented by Alistair Cooke, bringing information about the States to British audiences until Cooke died in 2004. It was one of the BBC's longest-running radio programmes, broadcasting on the Home Service, and continuing BBC Radio 4. It was also relayed on the BBC World Service. The programme itself was based on a similar programme by Alistair Cooke in the 1930s for American listeners about life in the UK on the NBC Red Network. After Letter from America, the BBC continued with a factual programme about the States in Americana from 2009 to 2011, presented by the resident American correspondent.

As of 2019, the BBC co-produced with Public Radio International and WGBH Boston, a weekly factual programme called The World, which is broadcast on various American public radio stations. Parts of the show are put together for a shorter programme called Boston Calling, which is available on Radio 4 and the domestic feed of the World Service. There have been attempts in the past to bring British formats to American audiences, such as The News Quiz USA. From 2005 to 2011, a time-shifted version of BBC Radio 1 was available on Sirius satellite radio. While in the UK, A Prairie Home Companion (called Garrison Keillor's Radio Show) was available weekly from 2002 on BBC7 to 2016, on BBC Radio 4 Extra. There have been several American personalities that have been on British airwaves, including music journalist Paul Gambaccini, disc jockey Suzi Quattro, and comedians Rich Hall and Greg Proops. While New Zealand-born disc jockey Zane Lowe, who spent much of his career in the UK, was recruited to Apple's Beats 1 station in the United States.

=== Music ===
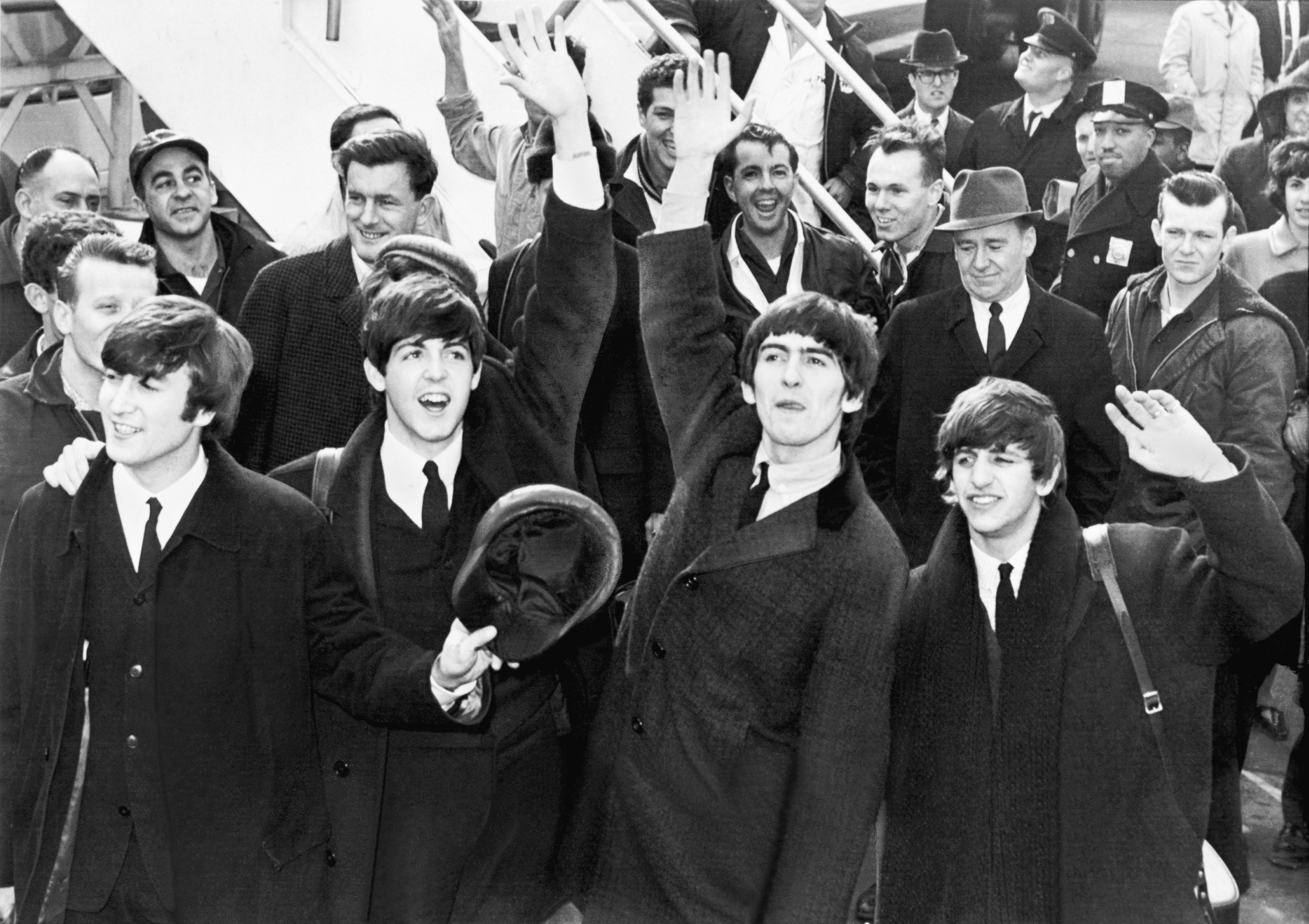
The arrival of The Beatles in the United States and their subsequent appearance on The Ed Sullivan Show in 1964 marked the beginning of what was called the British Invasion.

American artists, including Whitney Houston, Madonna, Tina Turner, Cher, Michael Jackson, Janet Jackson, Mariah Carey, Bing Crosby, Elvis Presley, Bob Dylan, Jimi Hendrix, Guns N' Roses, Stevie Wonder, Marvin Gaye, Diana Ross, Britney Spears, Christina Aguilera, Frank Sinatra, Lady Gaga, Taylor Swift, and Beyoncé, are popular in the United Kingdom. British artists, including The Beatles, Led Zeppelin, The Rolling Stones, Sting, The Who, Susan Boyle, Black Sabbath, Queen, Shirley Bassey, Tom Jones, David Bowie, Phil Collins, Pink Floyd, Rod Stewart, the Spice Girls, the Bee Gees, Katherine Jenkins, KT Tunstall, Joss Stone, Leona Lewis, Elton John, Coldplay, and Adele have achieved success in the large American market.

In the United Kingdom, many Hollywood films as well as Broadway musicals are closely associated and identified with the musical scores and soundtracks created by famous American composers such as George Gershwin, Rodgers and Hammerstein, Henry Mancini, John Williams, Alan Silvestri, Danny Elfman, Jerry Goldsmith, and James Horner. The Celtic music of the United Kingdom has had a dynamic effect upon American music. In particular, the traditional music of the Southern United States is descended from traditional Celtic music and English folk music of the colonial period, and the musical traditions of the South eventually gave rise to country music and, to a lesser extent, American folk. The birth of jazz, swing, big band, and especially rock and roll, all developed and originating in the United States, had greatly influenced the later development of rock music in the United Kingdom, particularly British rock bands such as The Beatles and Herman's Hermits, The Rolling Stones, while its American precursor, the blues, greatly influenced British electric rock.

== Sports ==
Despite sports being a major cultural interest in both the United States and the United Kingdom, there is little overlap in their most popular sports. The most popular team sports in the UK are football (soccer), rugby union, rugby league and cricket, while the most popular sports in the US are [American] football, baseball, ice hockey and basketball. The most popular sports in each country are considered minor sports in the other, with growing interest. Both nations are among the strongest in the world in all-time sporting success, with the United States being the most successful sports nation in the world.

=== Association football ===
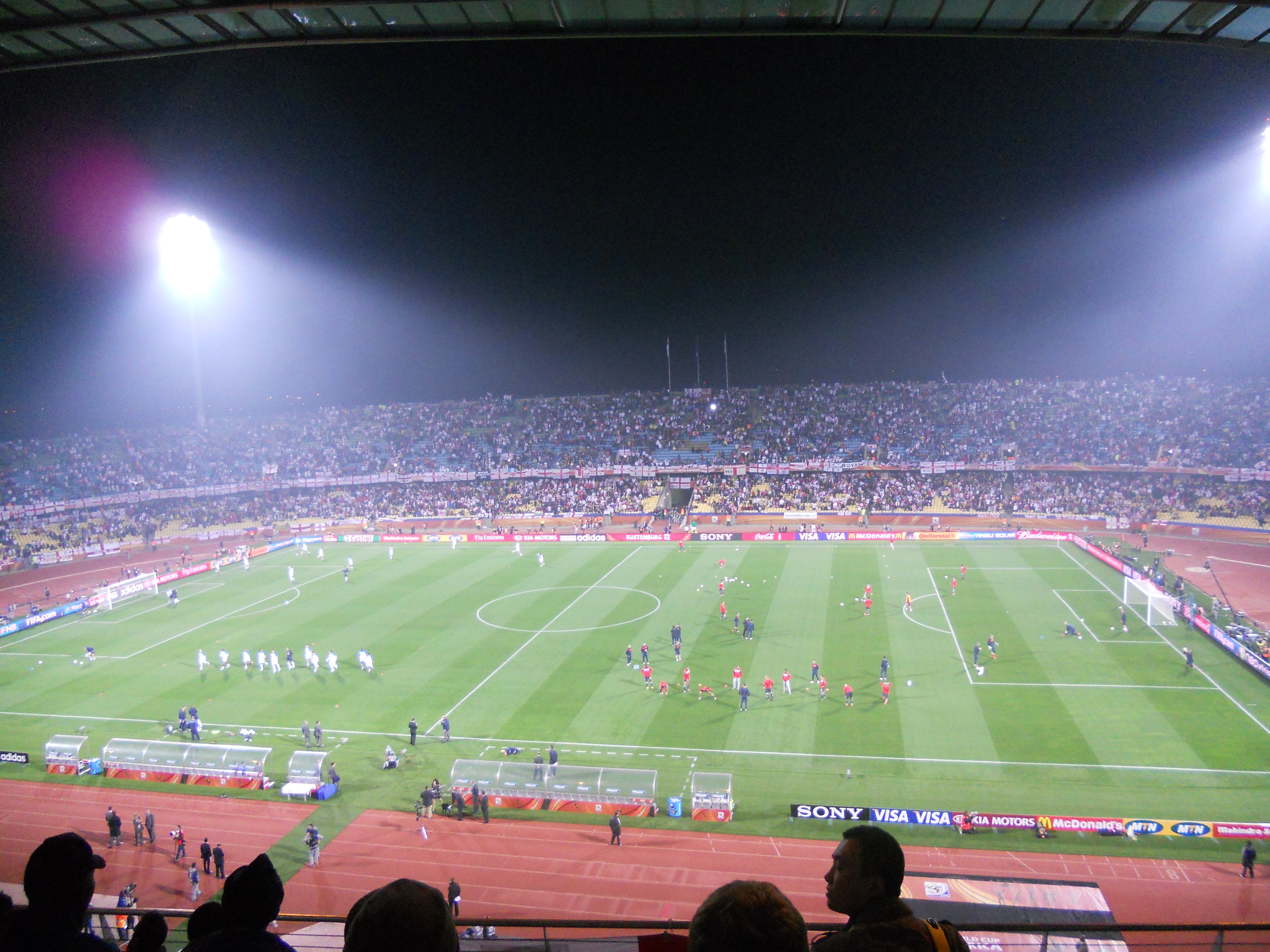
England and USA play each other at 2010 FIFA World Cup

The United States men's team has played multiple friendlies against their Home Nations counterparts. Being members of separate confederations with the Home Nations being part of UEFA and the US being part of CONCACAF, their only chance to play competitive games is during FIFA tournaments. The United States and England have played thrice at the FIFA World Cup – in 1950, 2010 and 2022 – and remain unbeaten. The United States' 1–0 victory over England in 1950 is considered to be one of the biggest upsets in World Cup history. The other two games have both ended in draws; 1–1 in 2010 and 0–0 in 2022. Additionally, the two have played in nine friendlies, with England winning eight and the United States one.

The United States and Wales have played once at the World Cup – in 2022 – in addition to two friendlies. The game ended in a 1–1 draw. The United States have yet to play competitive matches against Scotland and Northern Ireland.

The Premier League has seen many American players since its inception in 1992. Some of the prominent ones include Tim Howard, Christian Pulisic, Clint Dempsey and Landon Donovan. Similarly, the Major League Soccer has seen English players, including David Beckham, Frank Lampard and Steven Gerrard.

=== American football ===
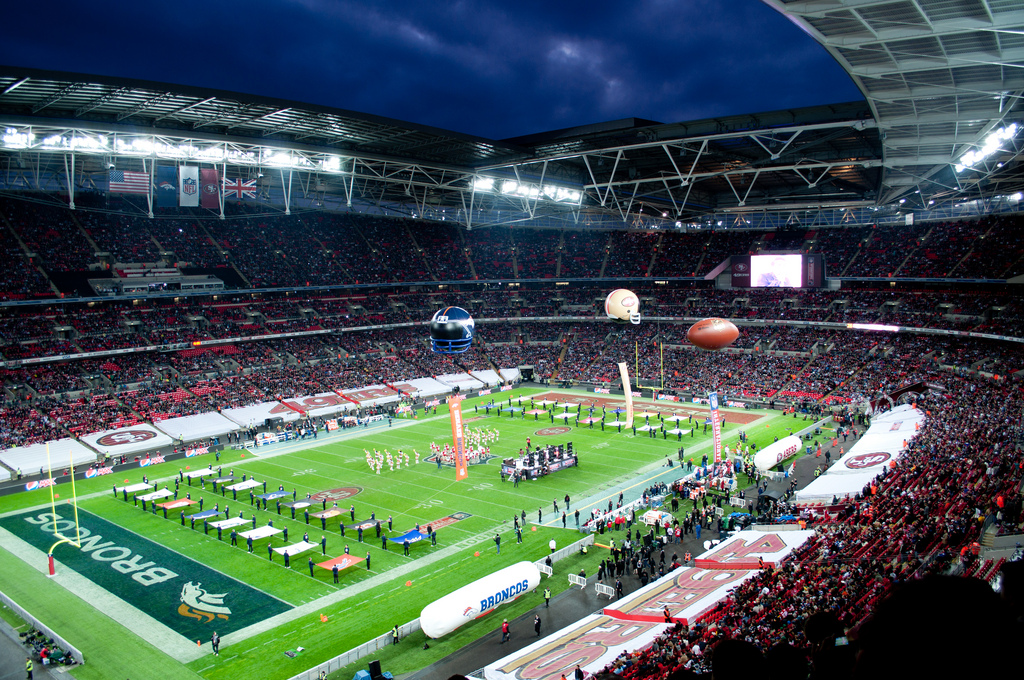
The opening ceremony at Wembley before the Denver Broncos play the San Francisco 49ers in a 2010 National Football League game

Gridiron football, which is known in the United Kingdom as American football, originated from two British sports, association football and rugby union football. It came about in the later part of the 19th century due to the development into a separate code, and led to becoming a separate sport from the other codes of football. Gridiron was in the past only known and played in UK by visiting American servicemen; firstly in 1910, by navy crews from USS Georgia, USS Idaho and USS Vermont, and then in the Second World War by UK-based service personnel. (The other gridiron code, Canadian football, is hardly known in the UK.)

After Channel 4 started showing the highlights of the American NFL in 1982, the sport became acknowledged by the British sporting world. Due to the Britons' unfamiliarity with American football, television guides and newspapers had printed articles explaining it. A year later, the first match between two British teams the London Ravens and the Northwich Spartans was played; the Ravens won. Later in the 1980s, the sport grew and rival teams started to play, which was helped by support from various American players, coaches, and sponsors like Coca-Cola and Budweiser. In 1986, the American Bowl was the first preseason NFL game to be played at the original Wembley Stadium, between the Chicago Bears and the Dallas Cowboys. By the early 1990s, due in part to the recession, Channel 4 ceased regular broadcasts of the NFL, but the Super Bowl has continued to be broadcast regularly on British television. The NFL has been broadcast by other British networks, including ITV, Channel 5, ESPN UK, British Eurosport, and Sky Sports.

In 2007, the NFL returned to Wembley with a regular season game between the Miami Dolphins and the New York Giants. Since then, the NFL has held additional games at Wembley and at other British stadiums. The NFL is considering siting a team in London permanently, with the Jacksonville Jaguars being the most likely team to relocate to the city. Noted British NFL players active during the 2019 season are Carolina Panthers defensive end, Nigerian-born Efe Obada and Atlanta Falcons tight end, Alex Grey.

=== Baseball ===
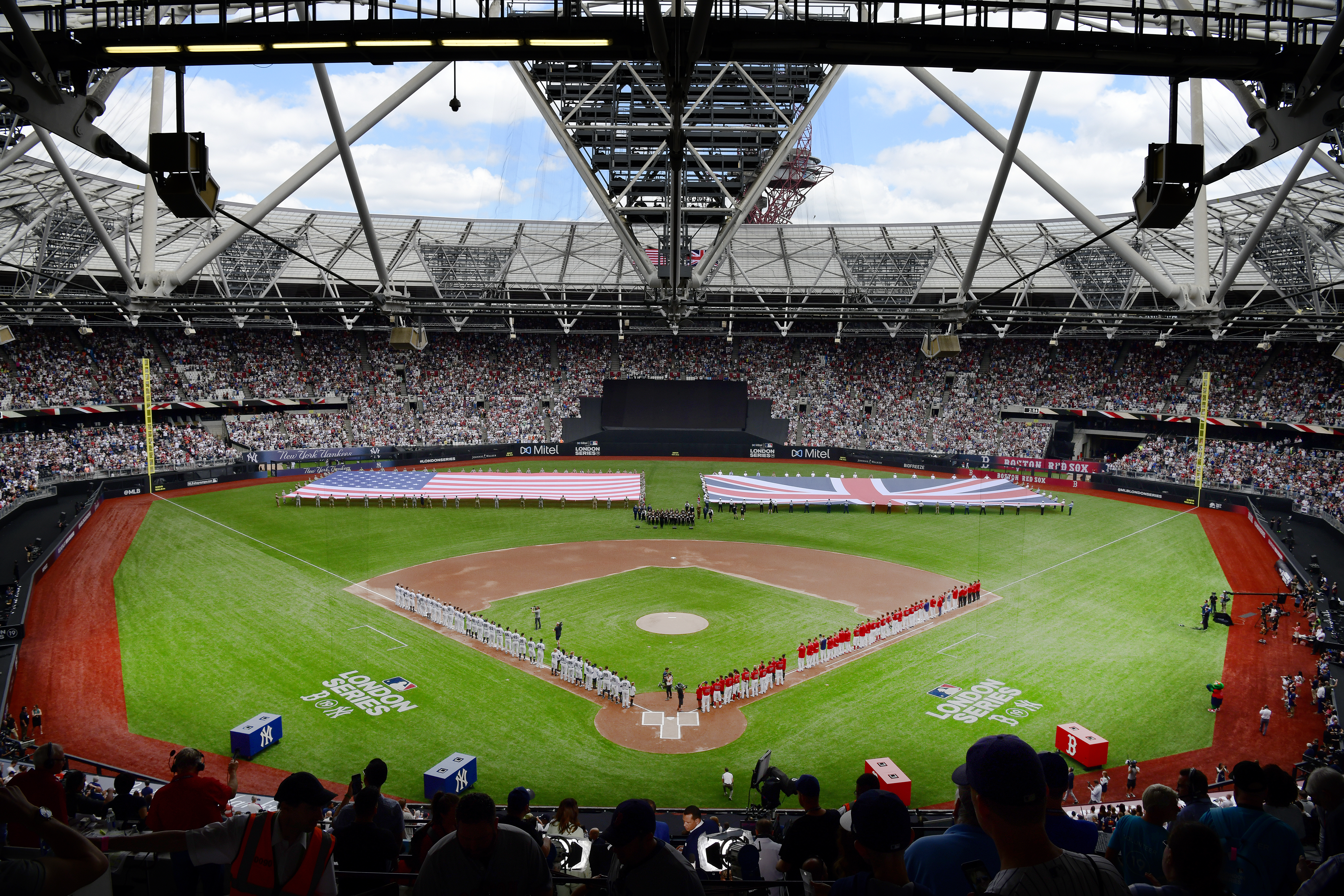
A pre-game photo of second game of the 2019 season of 2019 MLB London Series between the New York Yankees and the Boston Red Sox

The first recorded writings about baseball came in the mid-18th century when a version of the sport played indoors in 1748 in London, where it was played by then Prince of Wales, George III, and played outside in 1755 in the southern English town of Guildford. It was later brought over to the United States by British immigrants, where it developed in the modern version of the sport in the early 19th century in the creation and fountain of the modern baseball rule book, the Knickerbocker Rules in 1845. Eventually, it suppressed the popularity of the other notable ball-and-bat sport, which was played in the US at the time, which was cricket, by the end of the 19th century.

Sheffield-born Harry Wright was instrumental in the development of professional baseball in the United States, and he brought his touring team to Britain to promote the sport. Later, at the end of the 19th century Francis Ley, a Derby man claimed erroneously to have had 'discovered' the game on a trip to the United States, and Albert Goodwill Spalding, an American former star player and sporting goods businessman who saw opportunities to expand his business across the Atlantic, funded a second tour to the United Kingdom (Spalding had earlier toured under Wright's leadership). This continued with the establishment of the 1890 National League of Baseball of Great Britain, the first professional league in Britain. Baseball clubs were formed from well-known association football clubs Aston Villa, Stoke City, and Preston North End, who were joined by Ley's own Derby Baseball Club. During World War I, visiting U.S. service personnel from the U.S. Army and Navy played a demonstration game at Chelsea's Stamford Bridge in 1918. A crowd of 38,000 people, including King George V, attended. This led to a growing interest in the game across the Atlantic, and baseball teams were created during the inter-war period. This led to a peak in 1938 when there was a victory by Great Britain over the United States in the 1938 Amateur World Series which was held in England, which is considered the first World Cup of Baseball.

The popularity of baseball in the United Kingdom diminished during and after the Second World War; today, baseball is not widely played among Britons. Notwithstanding, Major League Baseball coverage is available to watch in the United Kingdom on the TNT Sports 4 channel, formerly BT Sport. In 2018, Major League Baseball announced a two-year deal to start the MLB London Series, a series of regular-season games at London Stadium. The 2019 series was contested between two rival teams, the New York Yankees and the Boston Red Sox. These games were broadcast on both BT Sport and the BBC. The 2020 series between the St. Louis Cardinals and the Chicago Cubs were cancelled due to the COVID-19 pandemic. The Cardinals–Cubs rivalry series was played in London in 2023, as part of an extended agreement to resume the London Series.

John Spinks, leader of the English rock band The Outfield, originally named the band "The Baseball Boys", in a reference to a gang in the film The Warriors. The band members said in 1986 that none of them were knowledgeable about baseball, but they were curious about the sport.

=== Cricket ===
The logo for the American Major League Cricket

Cricket was one of the major sports in the United States during its time as a British colony and for about a century afterward. Its major decline began with the 1860s Civil War, as it could not compete with the far shorter playing duration of baseball, among other factors. In the 21st century, immigration from cricket-playing countries and the spread of the shortened T20 format have contributed to a minor revival of the game.

== Gallery ==
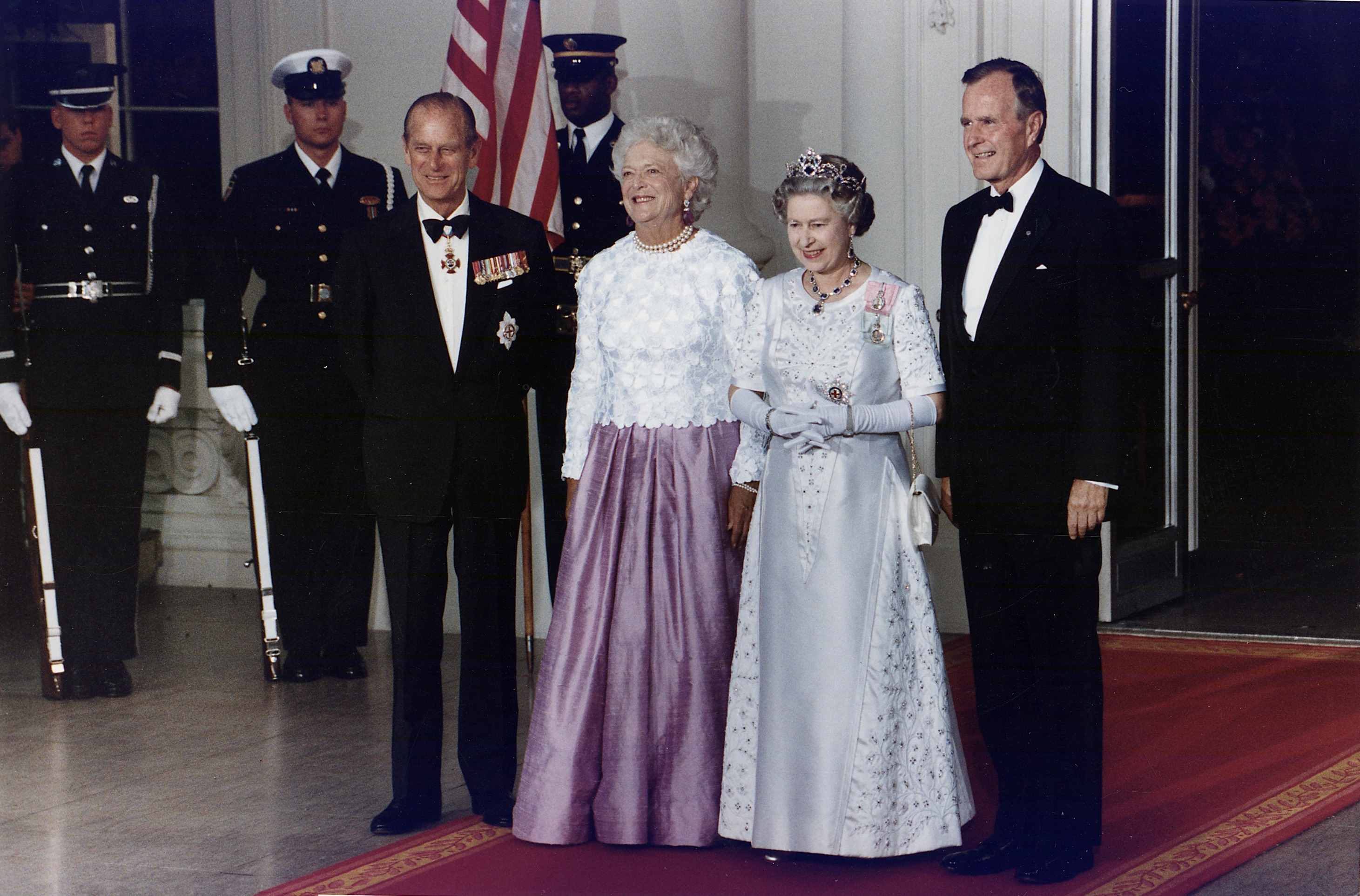
President George H. W. Bush and First Lady Barbara Bush with Queen Elizabeth II and Prince Philip, Duke of Edinburgh at the beginning of an official dinner at the White House, 1991

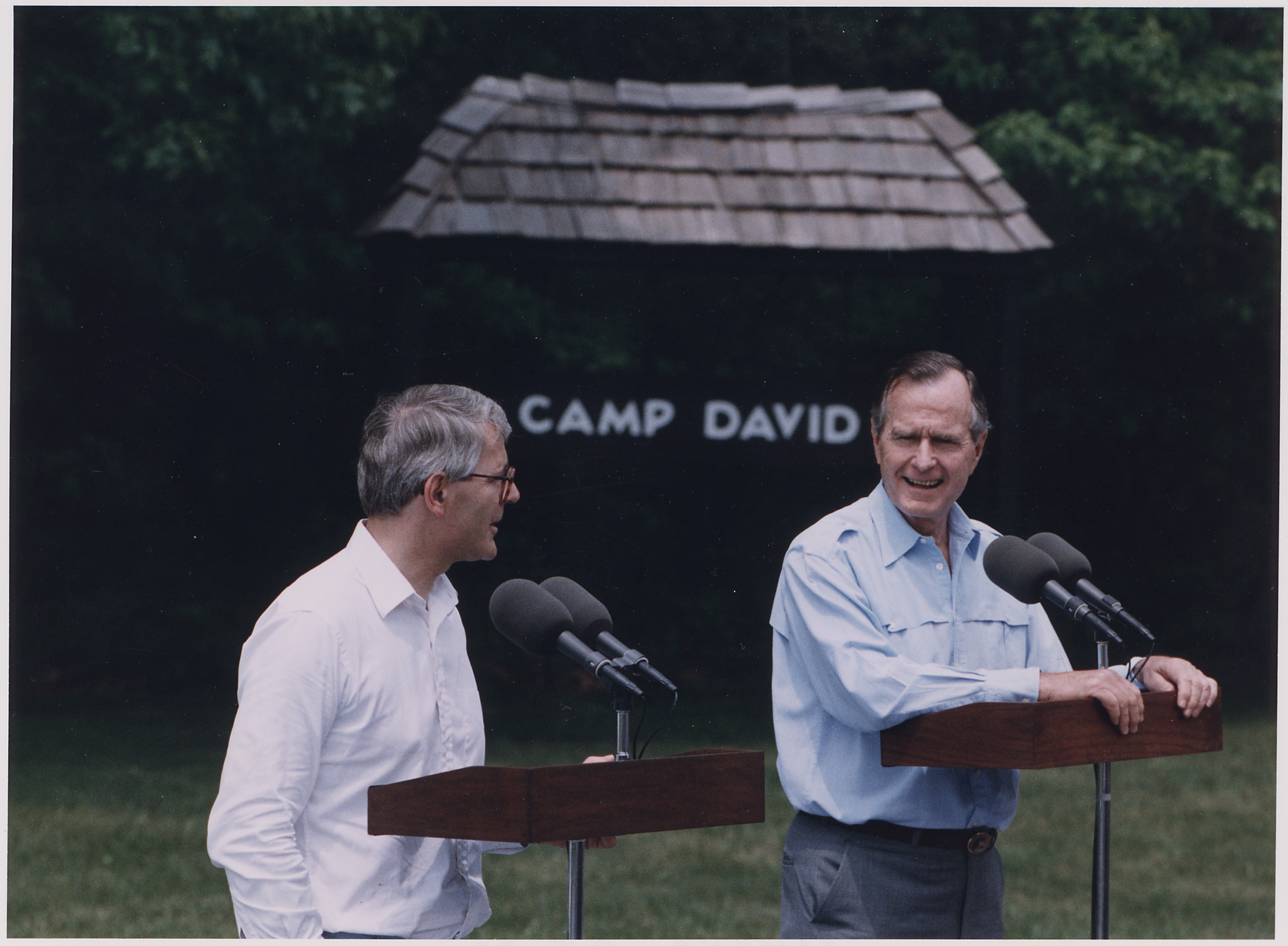
President George H. W. Bush and Prime Minister John Major conducting a press conference at Camp David, 1992

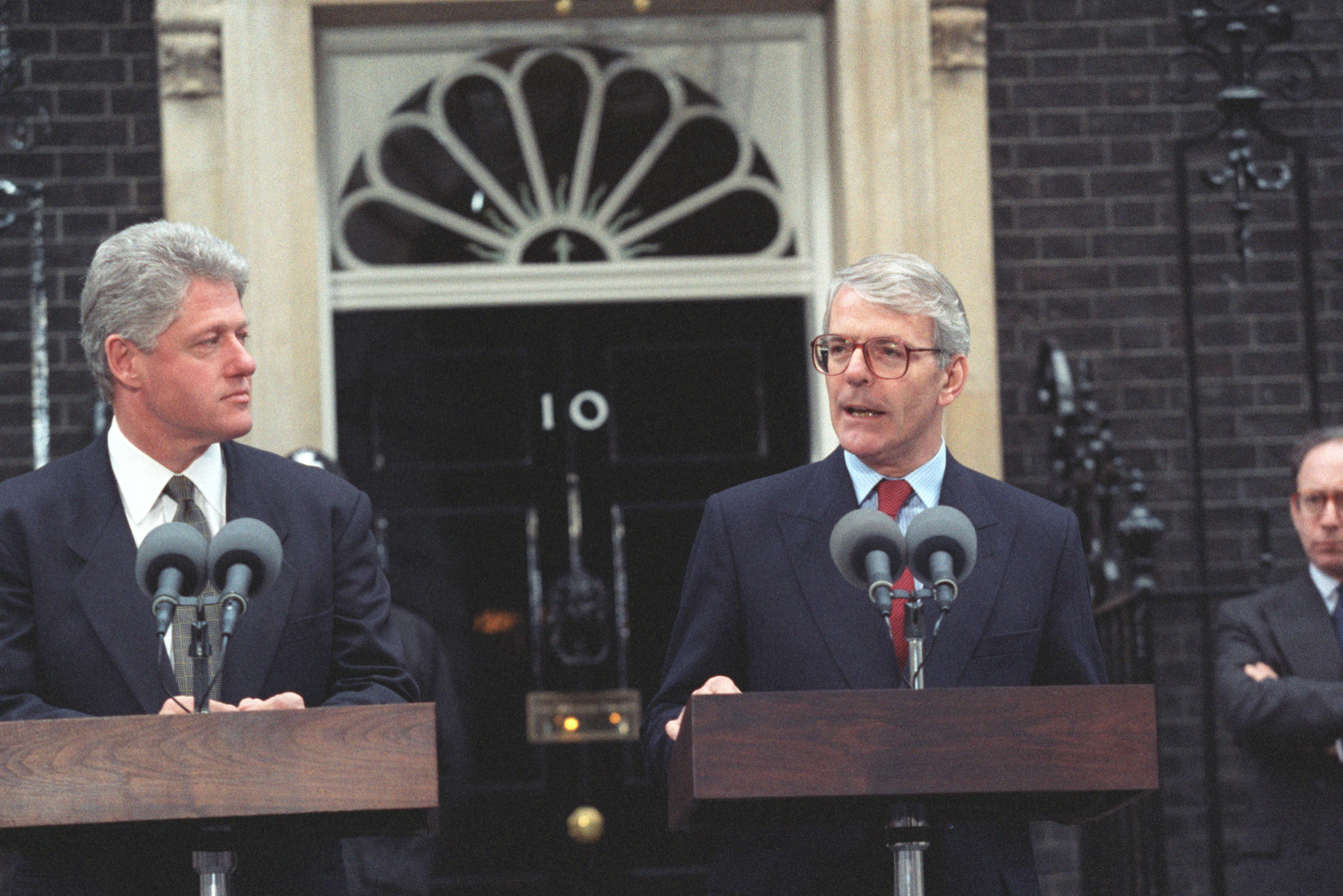
President Bill Clinton and Prime Minister John Major give remarks during a press conference at 10 Downing Street, 1995

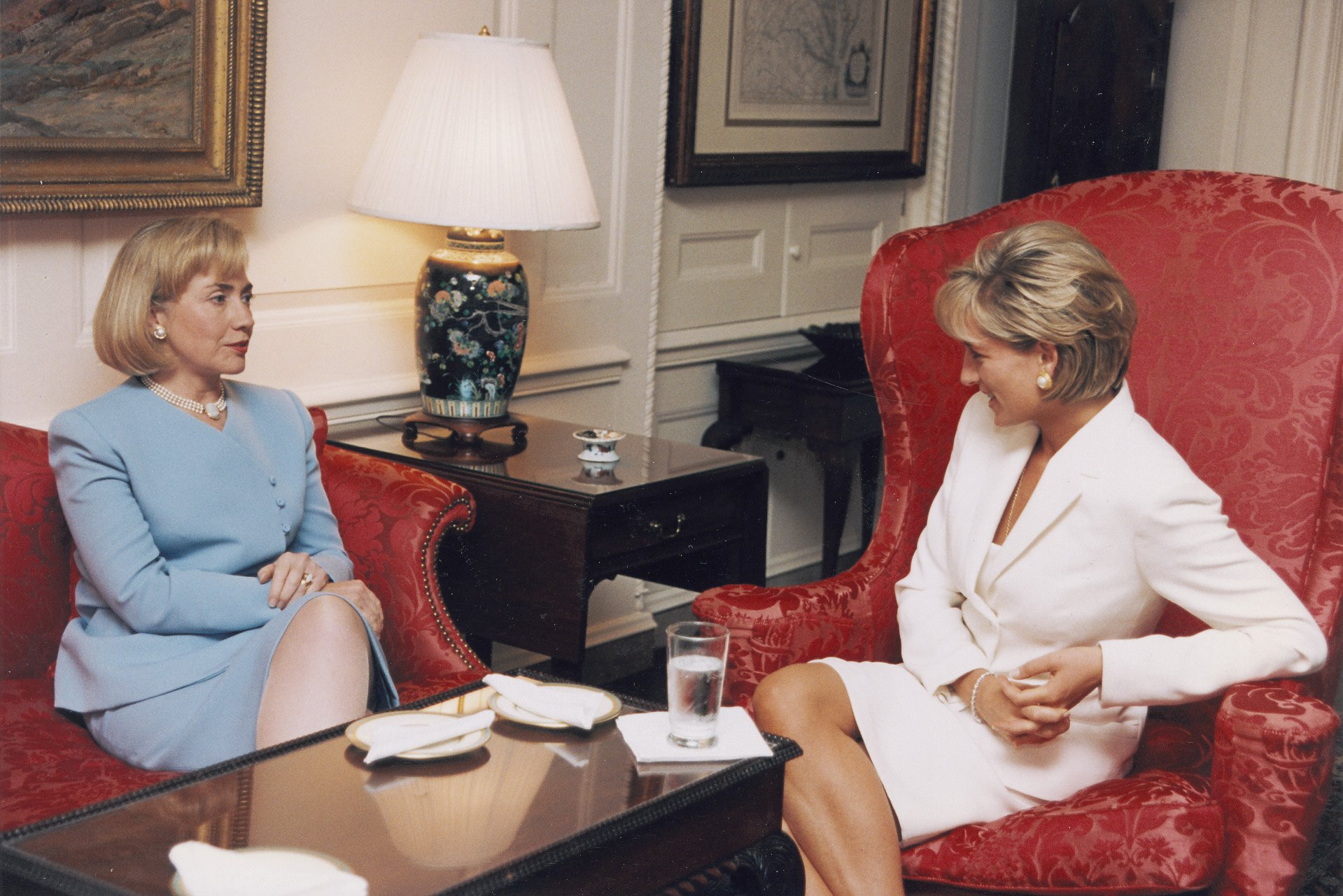
First Lady Hillary Clinton and Diana, Princess of Wales chatting in the White House Map Room, 1997

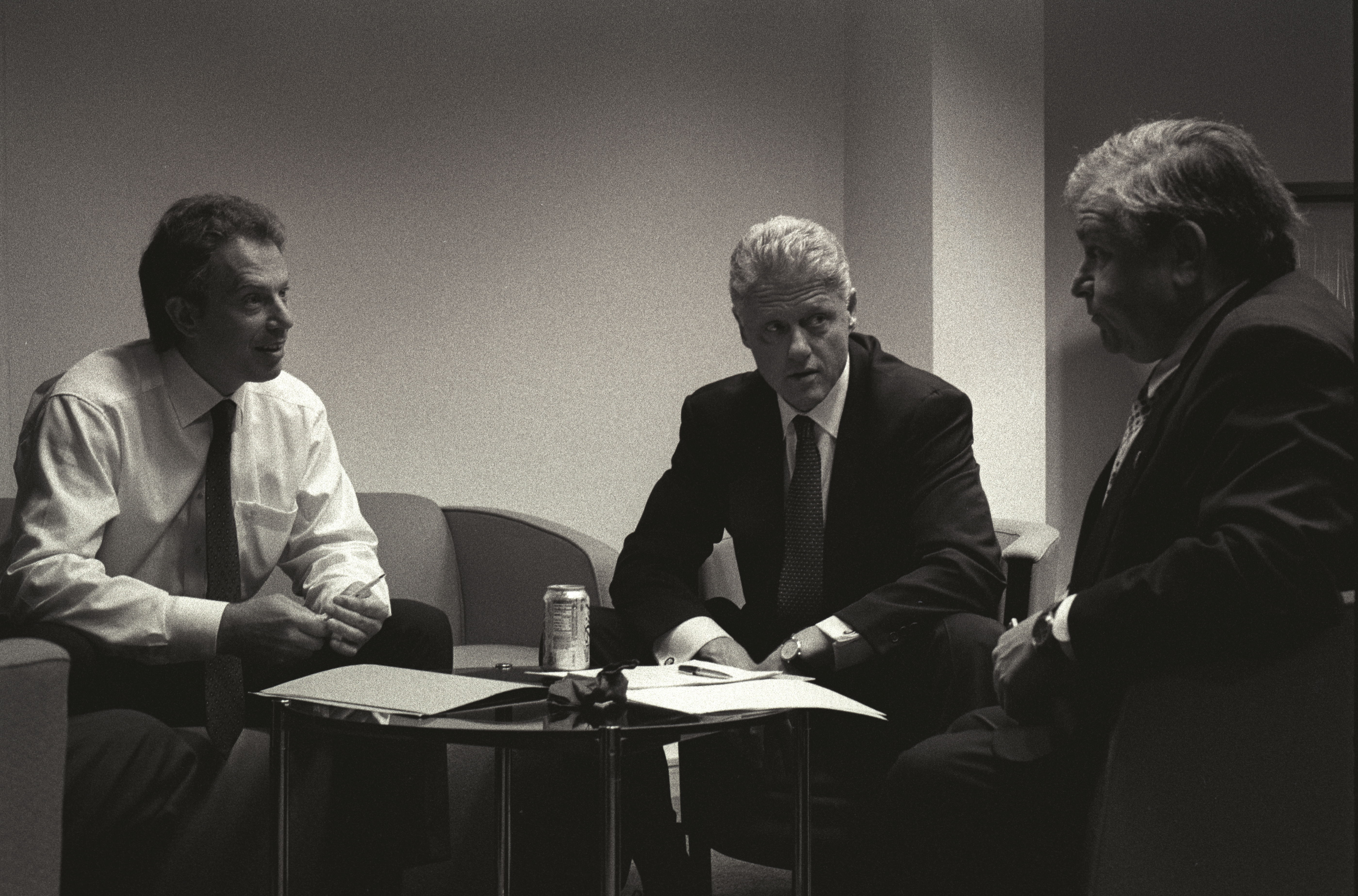
Prime Minister Tony Blair and President Bill Clinton in a meeting with US National Security Advisor Sandy Berger in Belfast, 1998

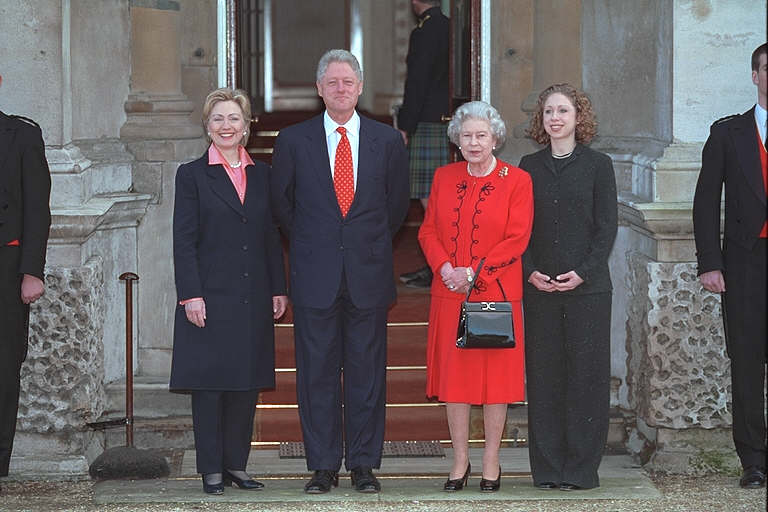
President Bill Clinton, First Lady Hillary Clinton, and Chelsea Clinton with Queen Elizabeth II at Buckingham Palace, 2000

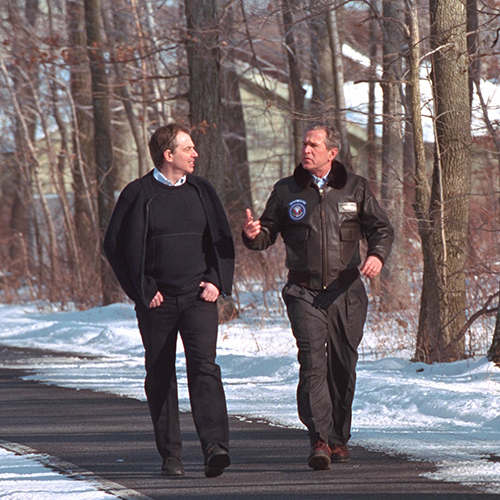
Prime Minister Tony Blair and President George W. Bush walking at Camp David, 2001

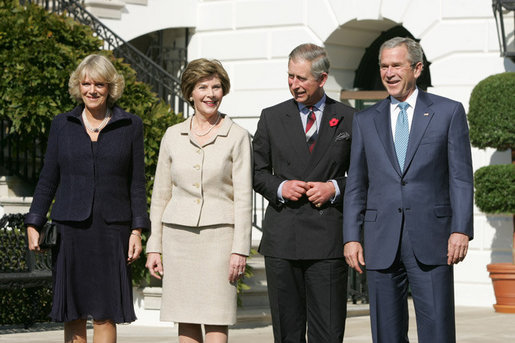
President George W. Bush and First Lady Laura Bush with Charles, Prince of Wales and Camilla, Duchess of Cornwall at the White House during the Waleses' official visit to the United States, 2005

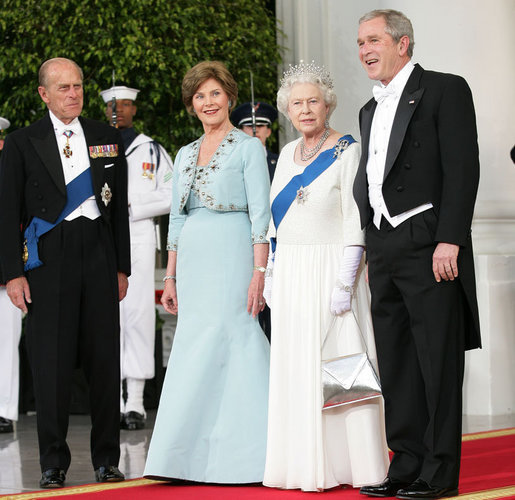
President George W. Bush and First Lady Laura Bush with Queen Elizabeth II and Prince Philip, Duke of Edinburgh at the beginning of an official dinner at the White House, 2007

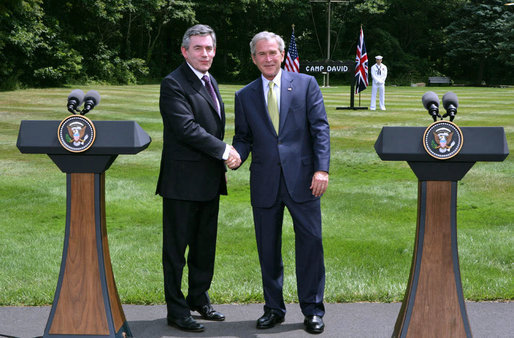
Prime Minister Gordon Brown and President George W. Bush having their first meeting at Camp David, 2007

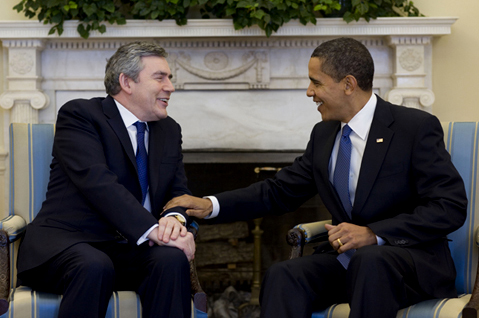
Prime Minister Gordon Brown and President Barack Obama in the Oval Office, 2009

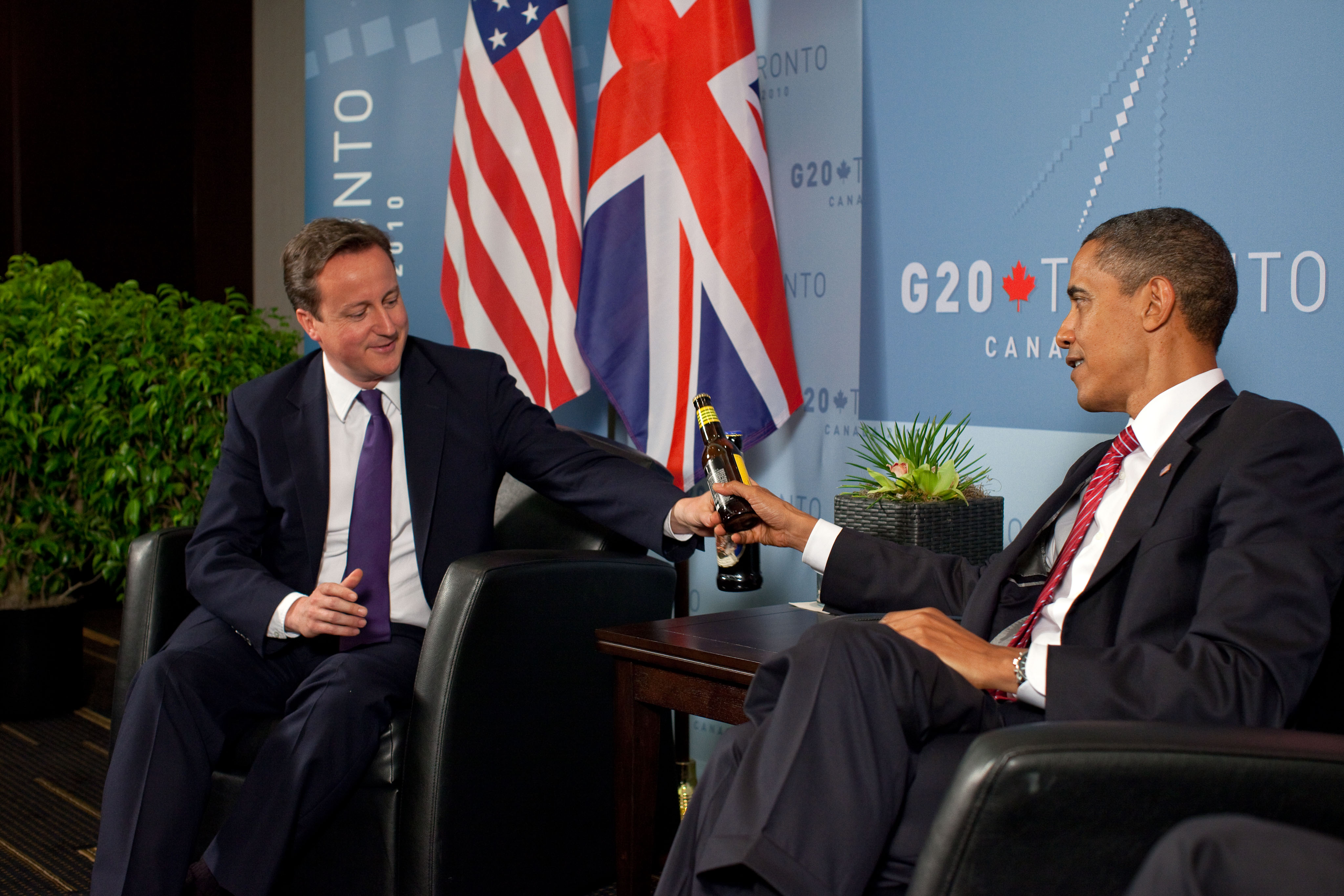
Prime Minister David Cameron and President Barack Obama at a bilateral meeting during the G20 Summit in Toronto, 2010

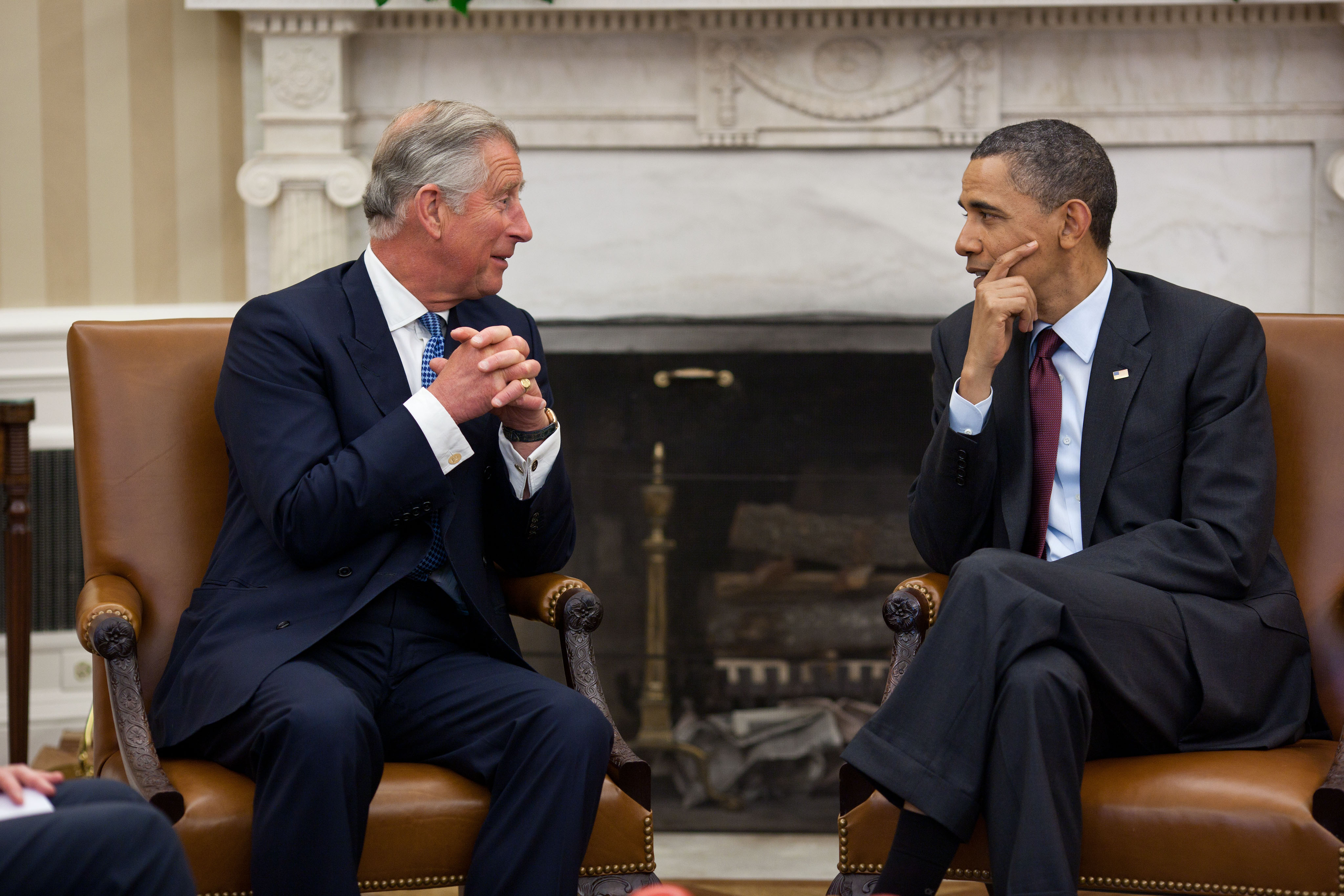
Charles, Prince of Wales meets with President Barack Obama in the Oval Office, 2011

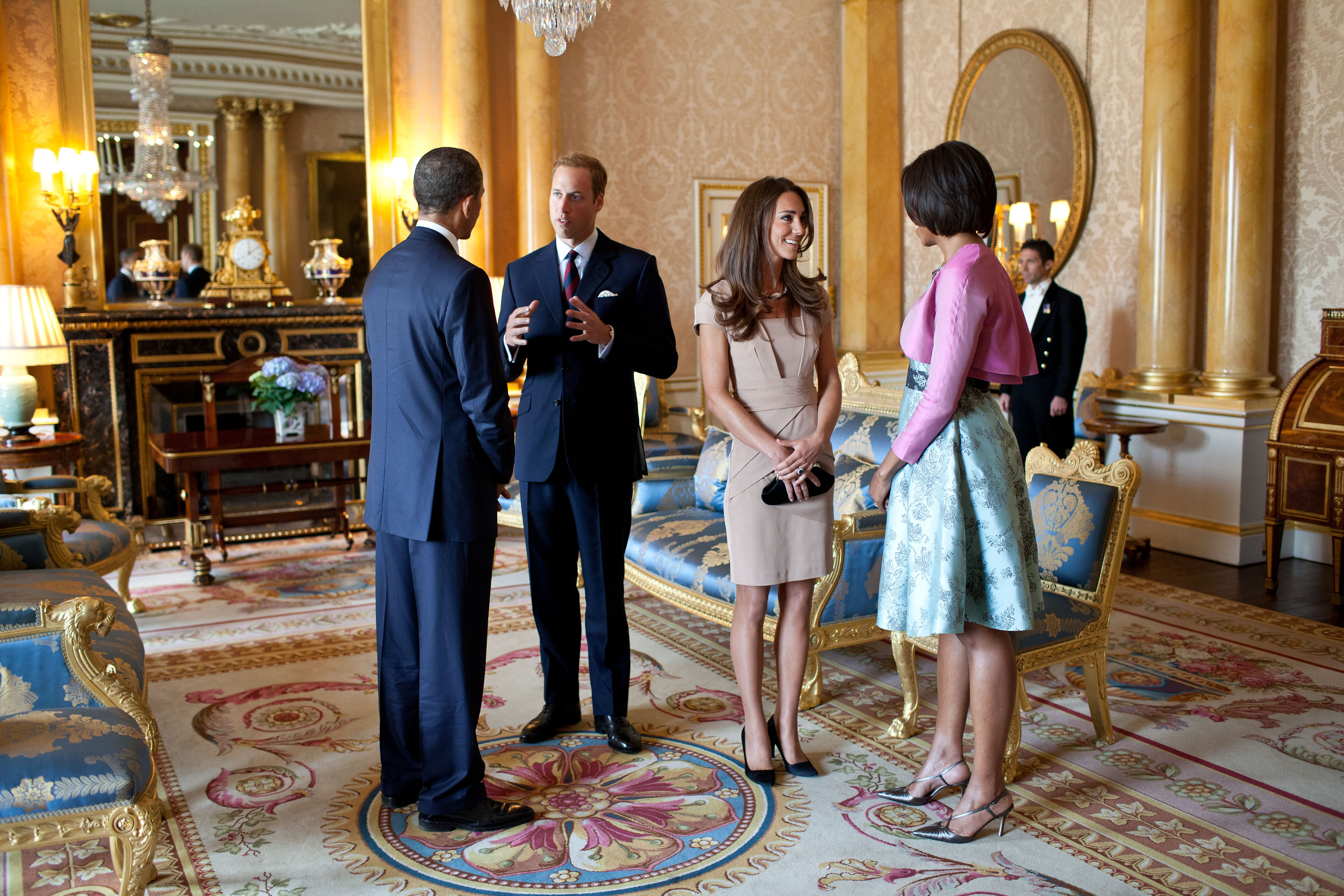
President Barack Obama and First Lady Michelle Obama with Prince William, Duke of Cambridge and Catherine, Duchess of Cambridge at Buckingham Palace, 2011

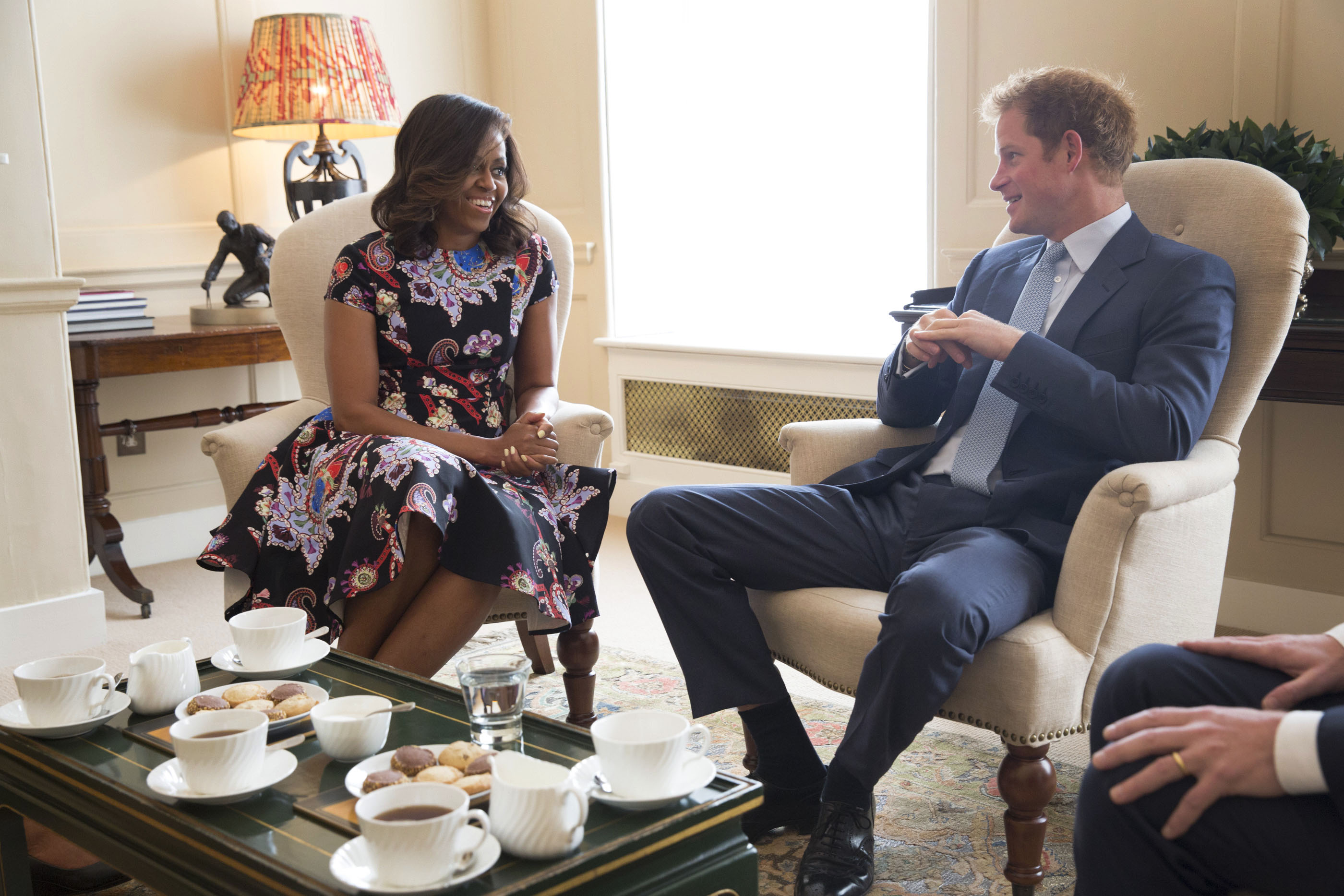
First Lady Michelle Obama and Prince Harry of Wales engaging in conversation at Kensington Palace, 2015

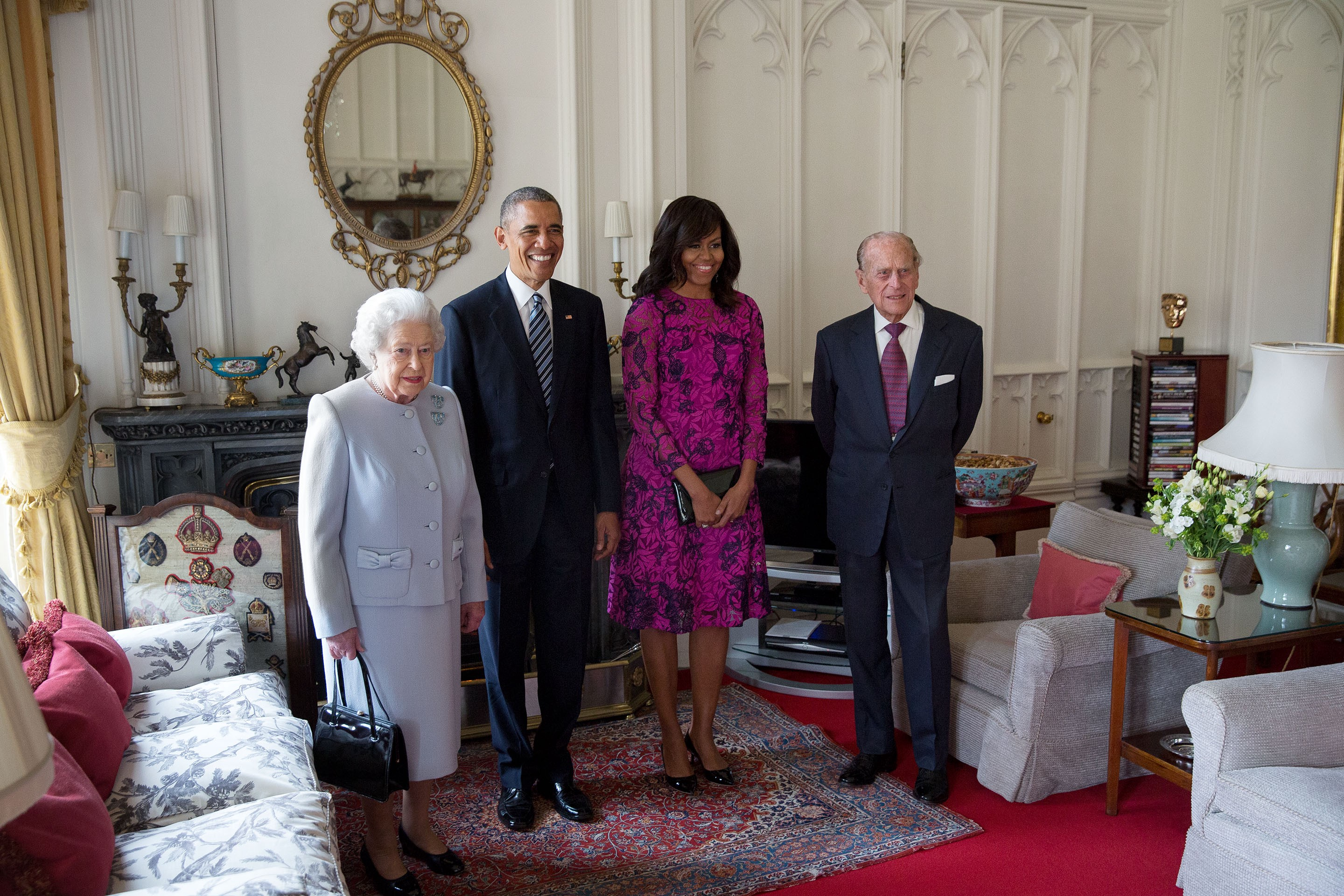
President Barack Obama and First Lady Michelle Obama with Queen Elizabeth II and Prince Philip, Duke of Edinburgh at Windsor Castle, 2016

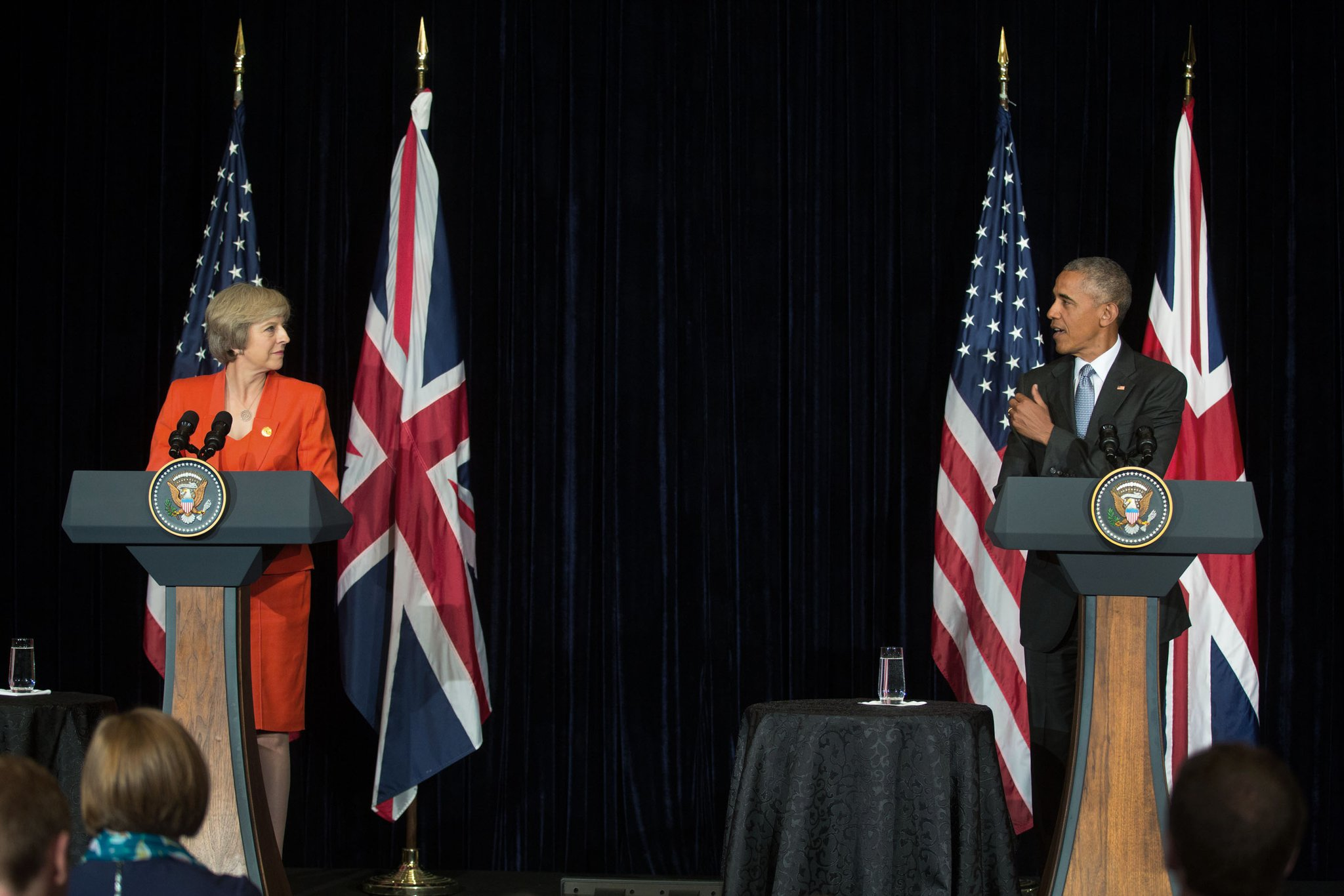
Prime Minister Theresa May and President Barack Obama having their first meeting during the G20 Summit in Hangzhou, China, 2016

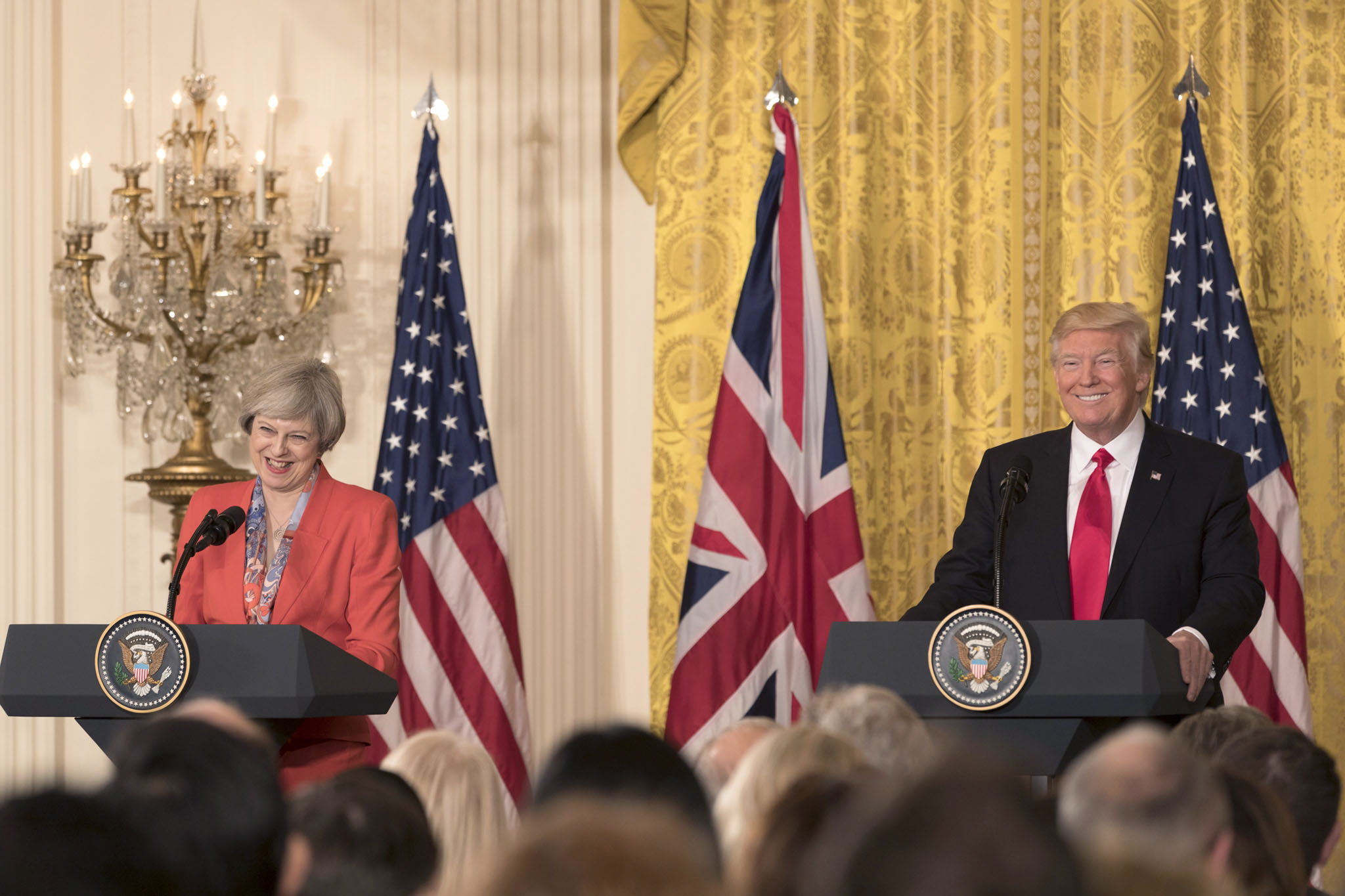
Prime Minister Theresa May and President Donald Trump conducting a press conference in the East Room of the White House, 2017

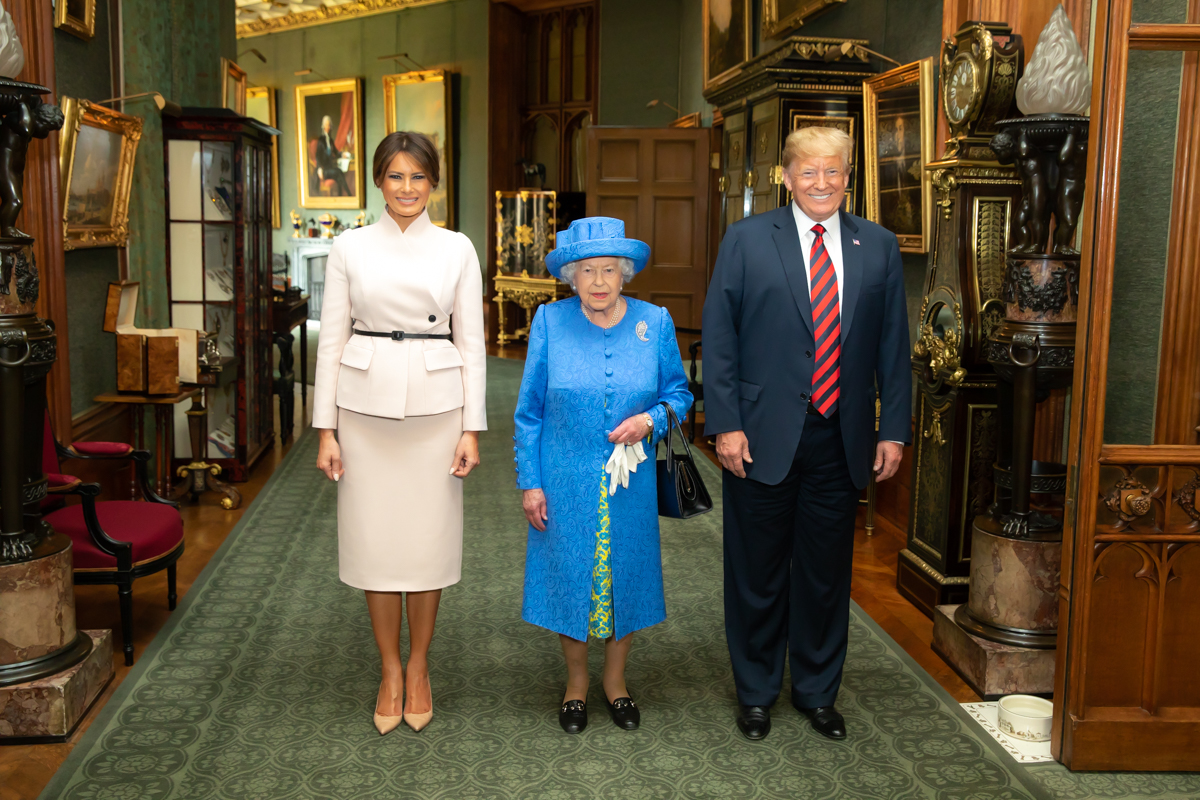
President Donald Trump and First Lady Melania Trump with Queen Elizabeth II at Windsor Castle, 2018

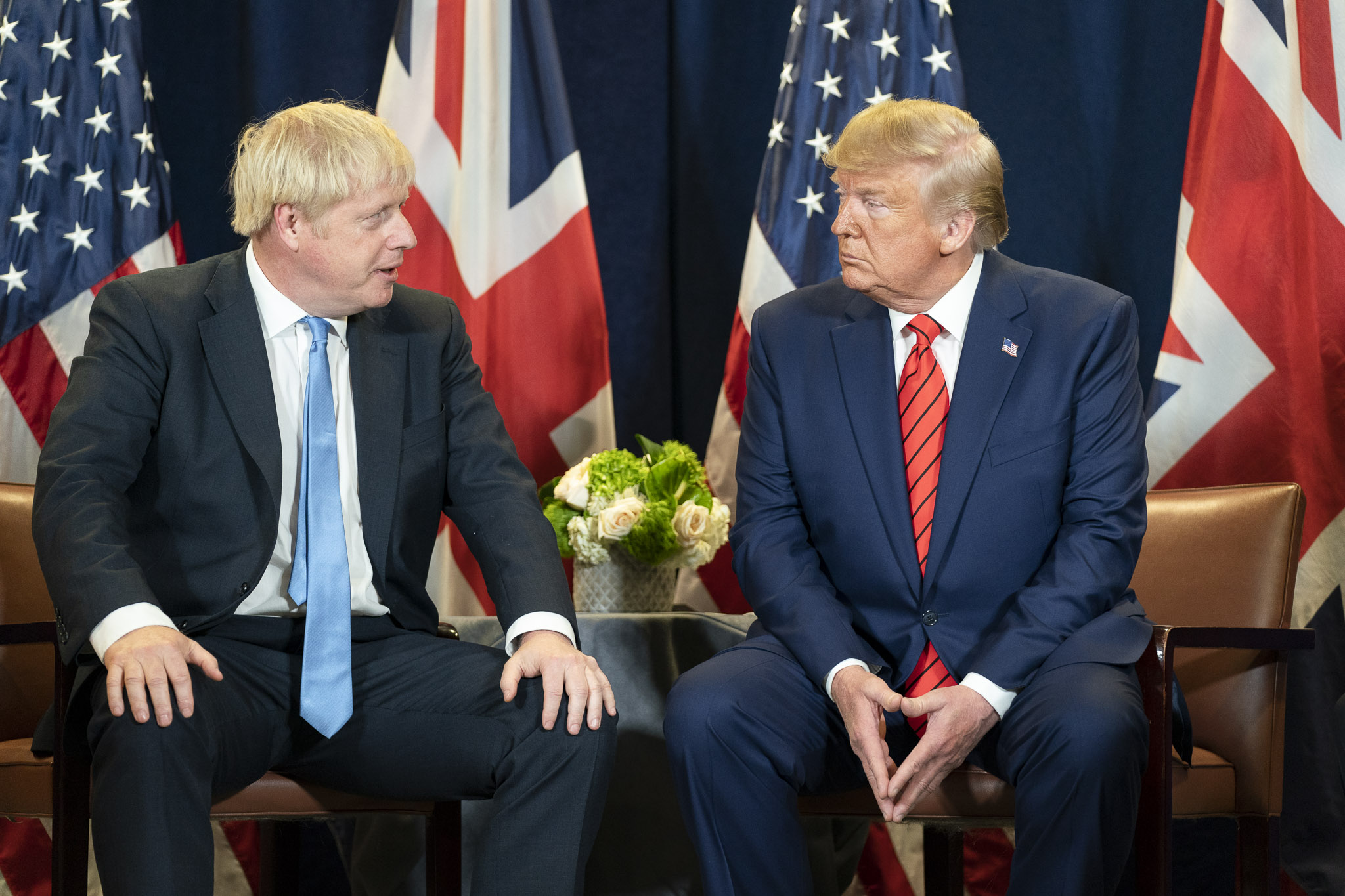
Prime Minister Boris Johnson and President Donald Trump conducting a bilateral meeting in New York City, 2019

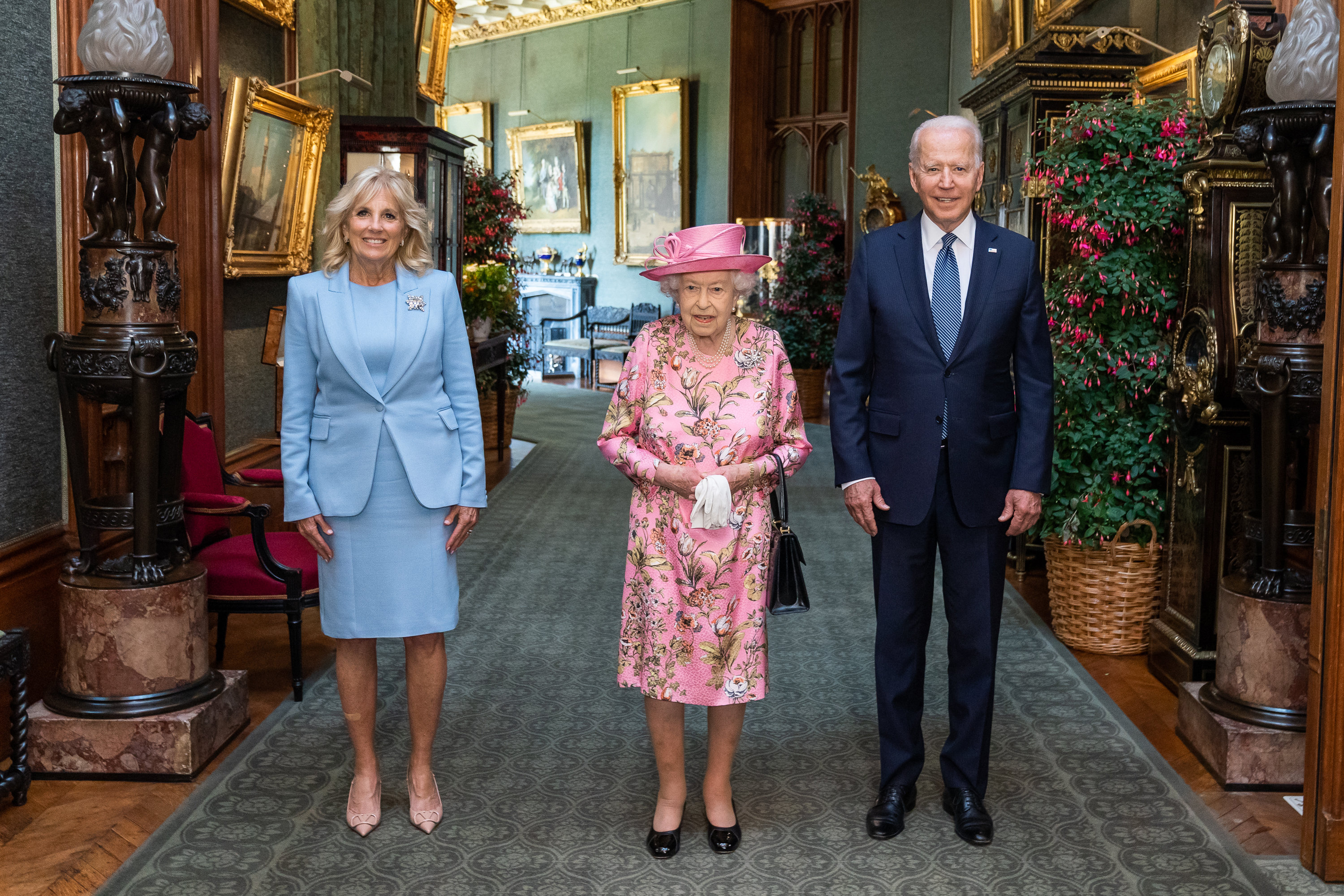
President Joe Biden and First Lady Jill Biden with Queen Elizabeth II at Windsor Castle, 2021

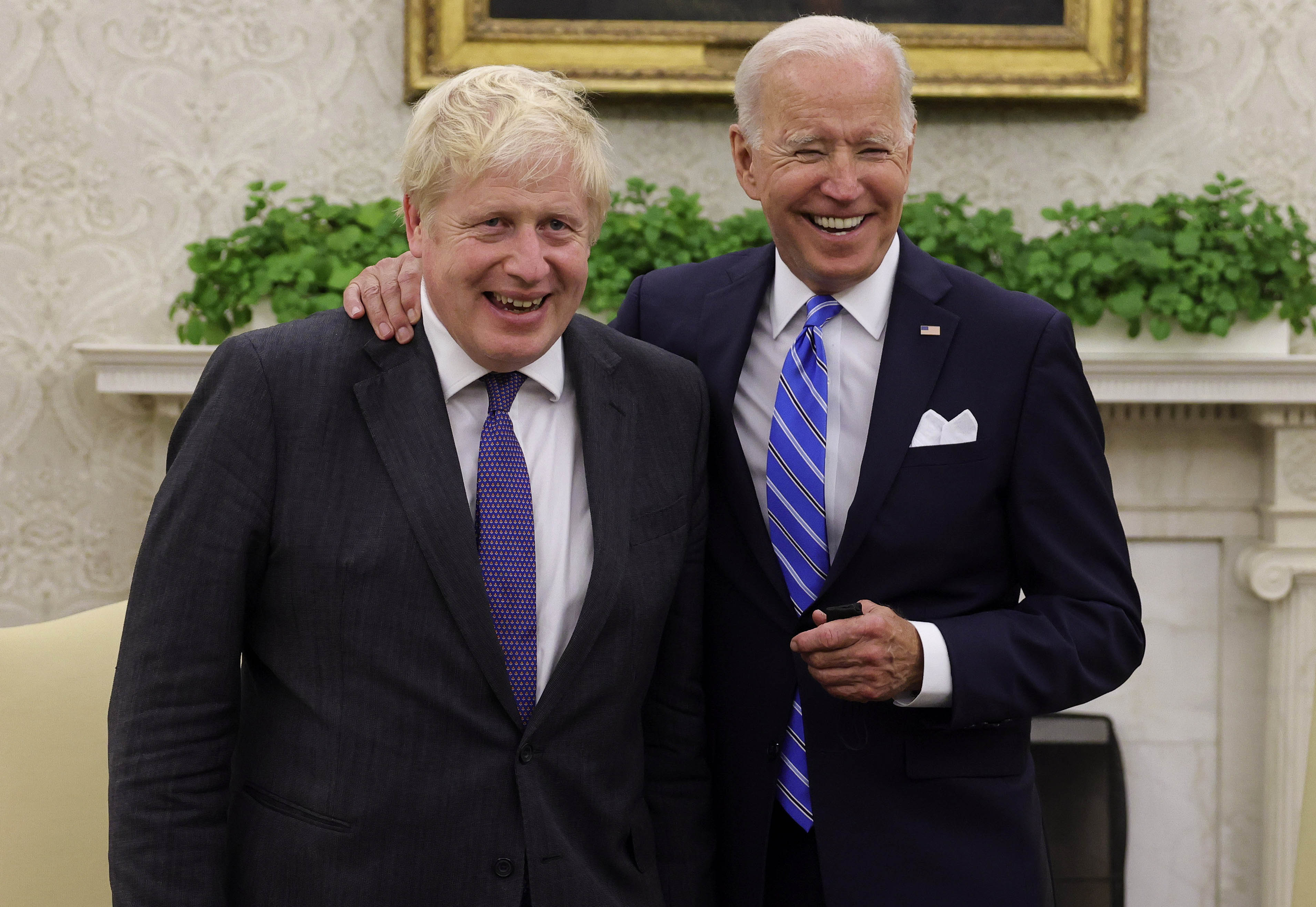
Prime Minister Boris Johnson and President Joe Biden during a bilateral meeting in the Oval Office at the White House, 2021

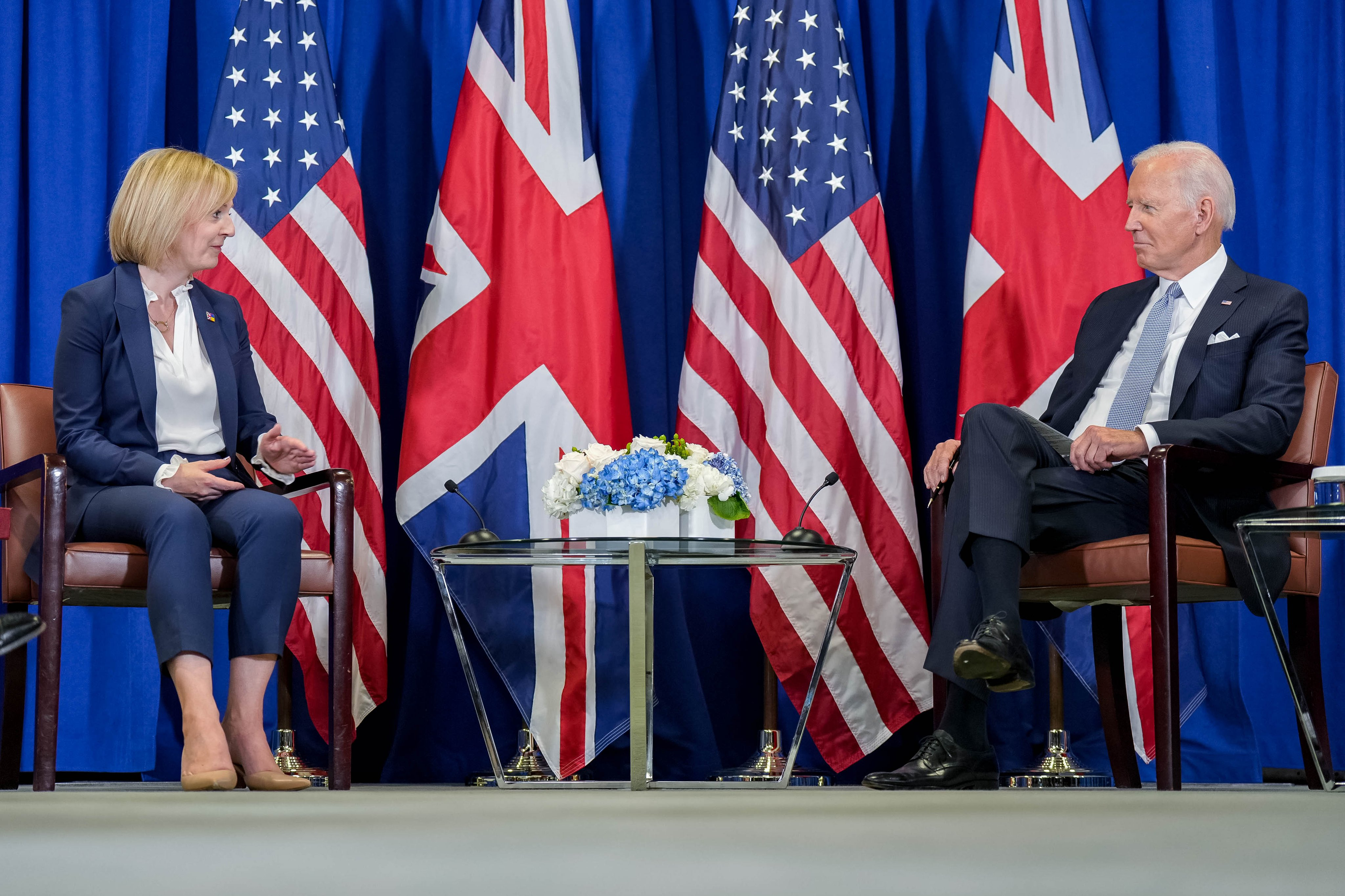
Prime Minister Liz Truss and President Joe Biden conducting a bilateral meeting in New York City, 2022

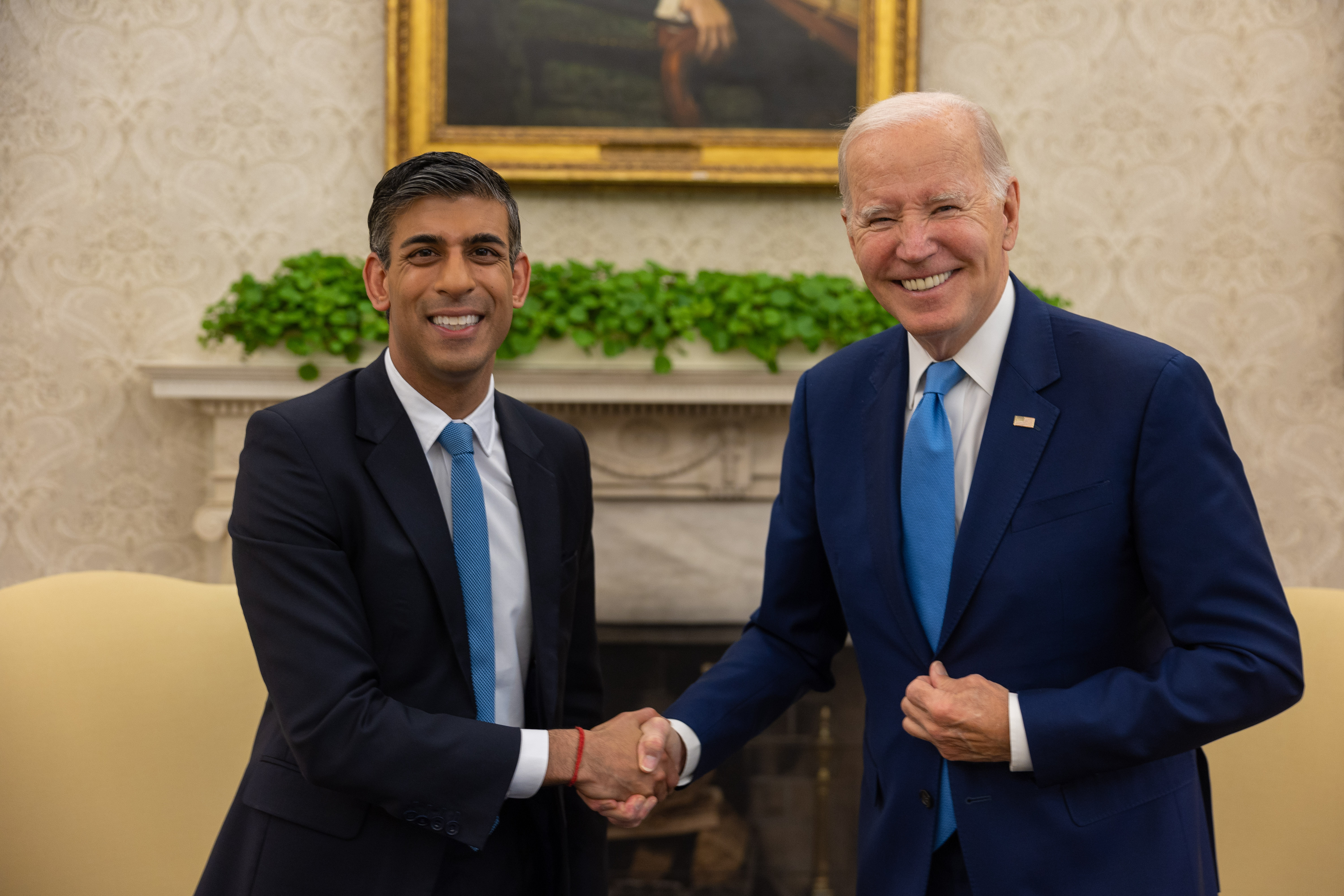
Prime Minister Rishi Sunak and President Joe Biden during a bilateral meeting in the Oval Office, 2023

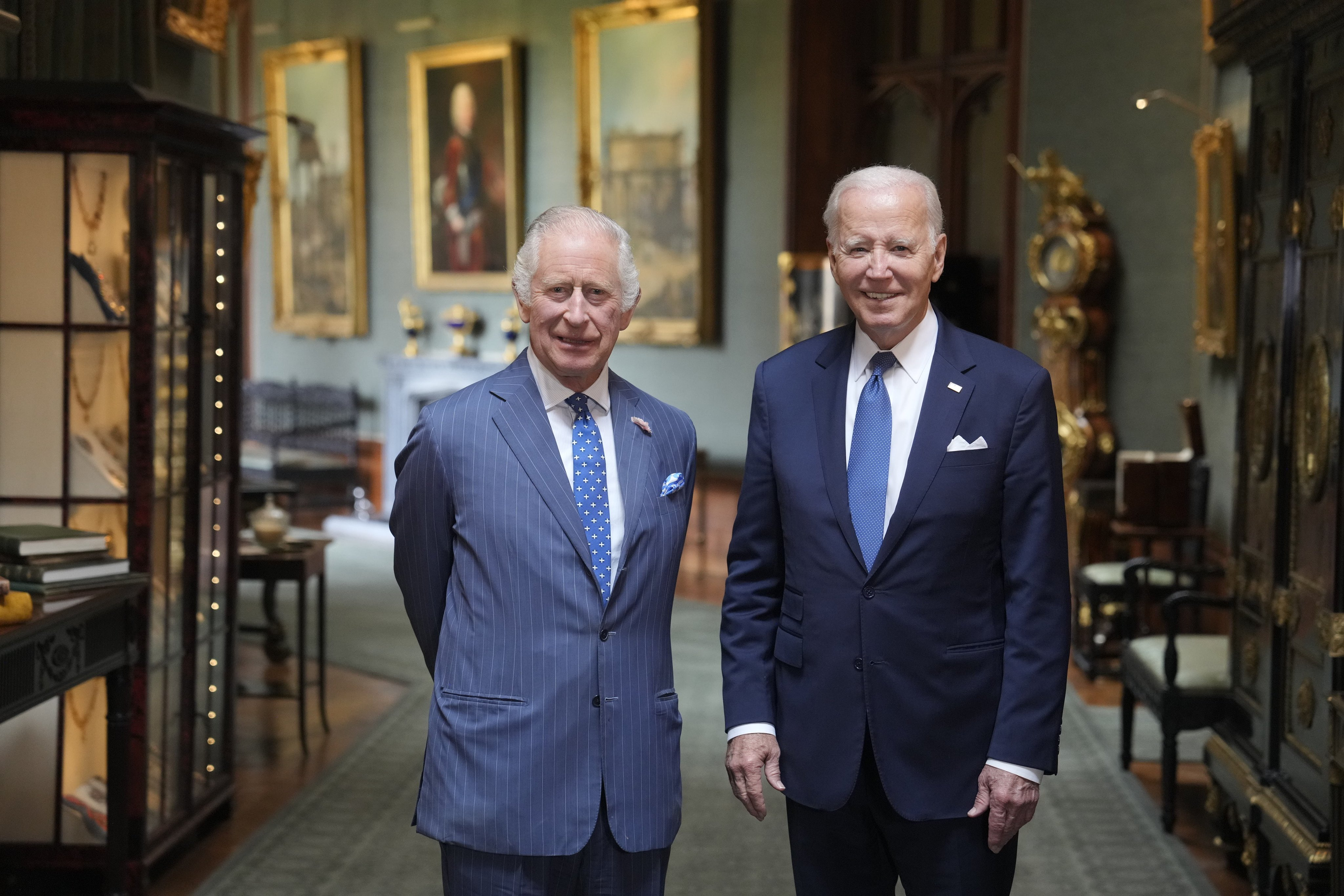
President Joe Biden meets with King Charles III at Windsor Castle, 2023

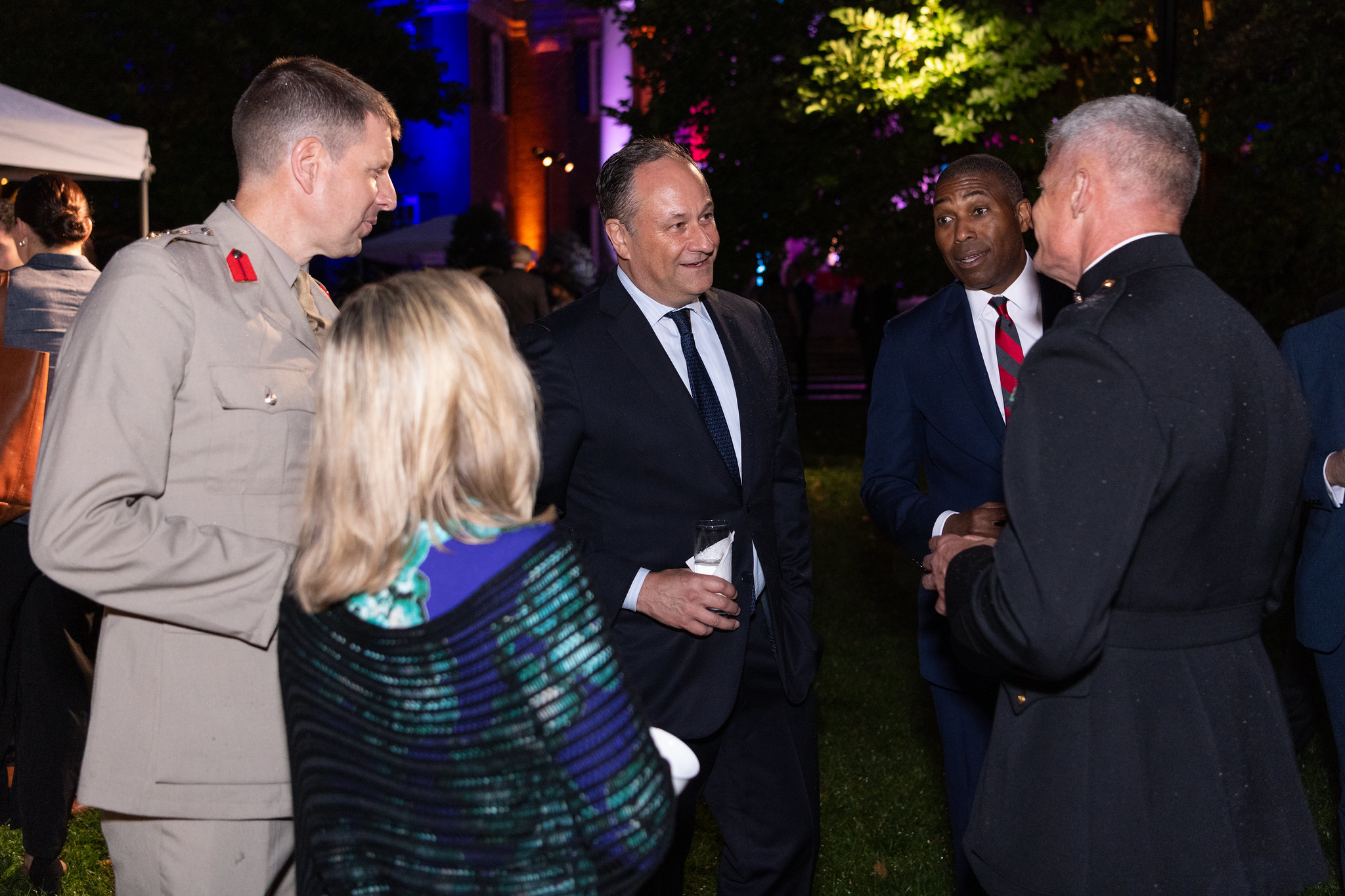
Second Gentleman Doug Emhoff, attends party at the British Embassy for King Charles III's Official Birthday

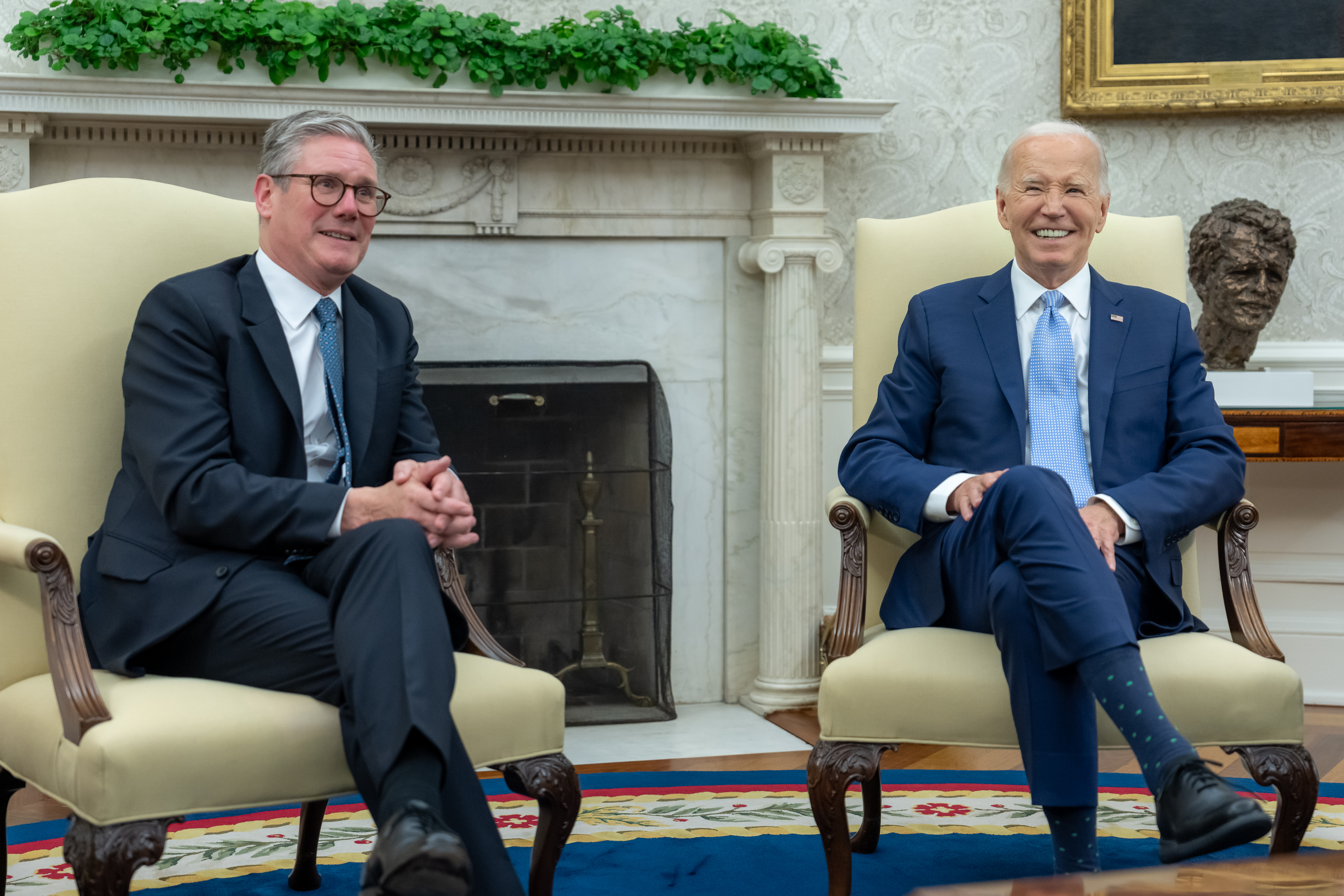
Prime Minister Keir Starmer and President Joe Biden during a bilateral meeting in the Oval Office, 2024

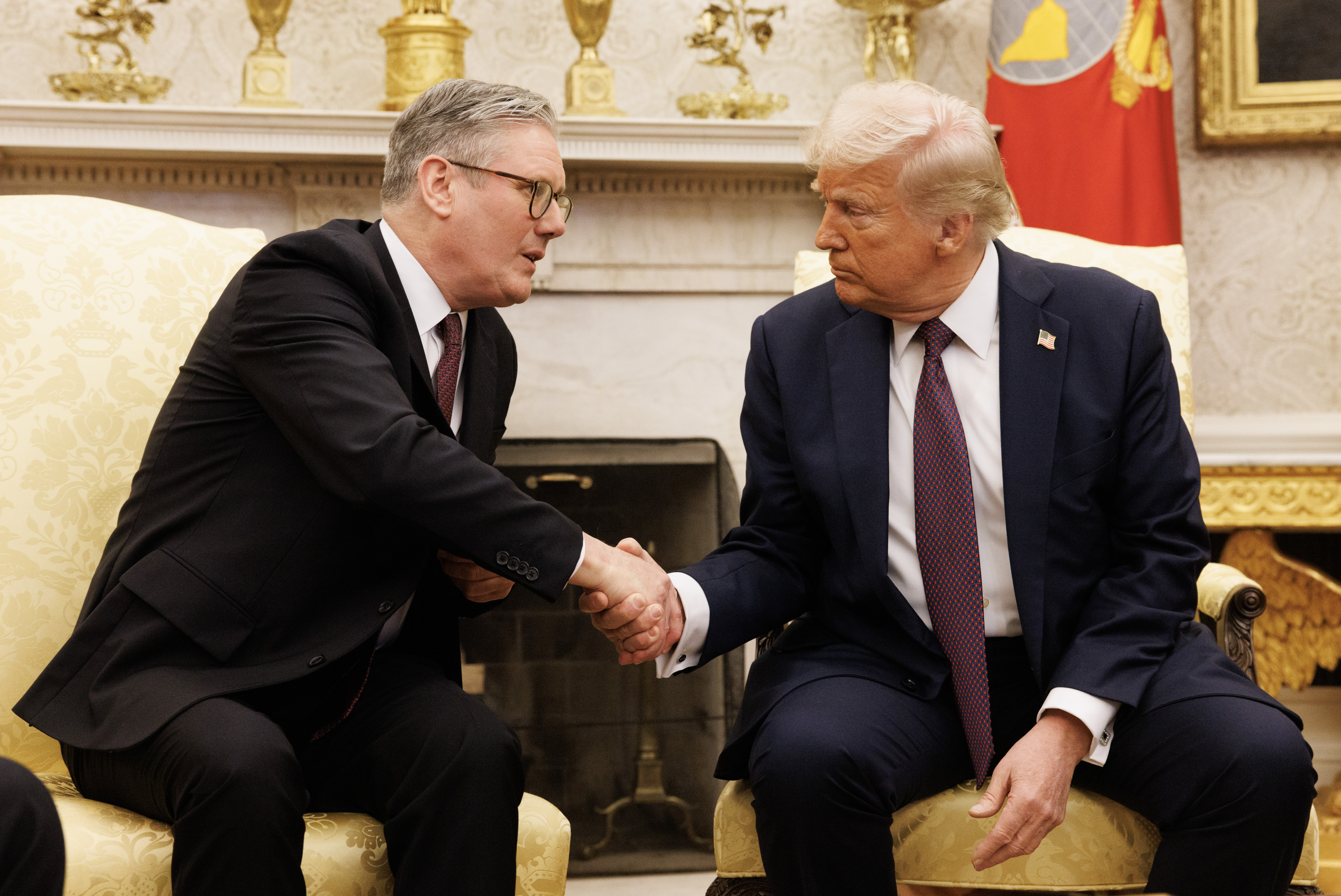
Prime Minister Keir Starmer and President Donald Trump during a bilateral meeting in the Oval Office, 2025

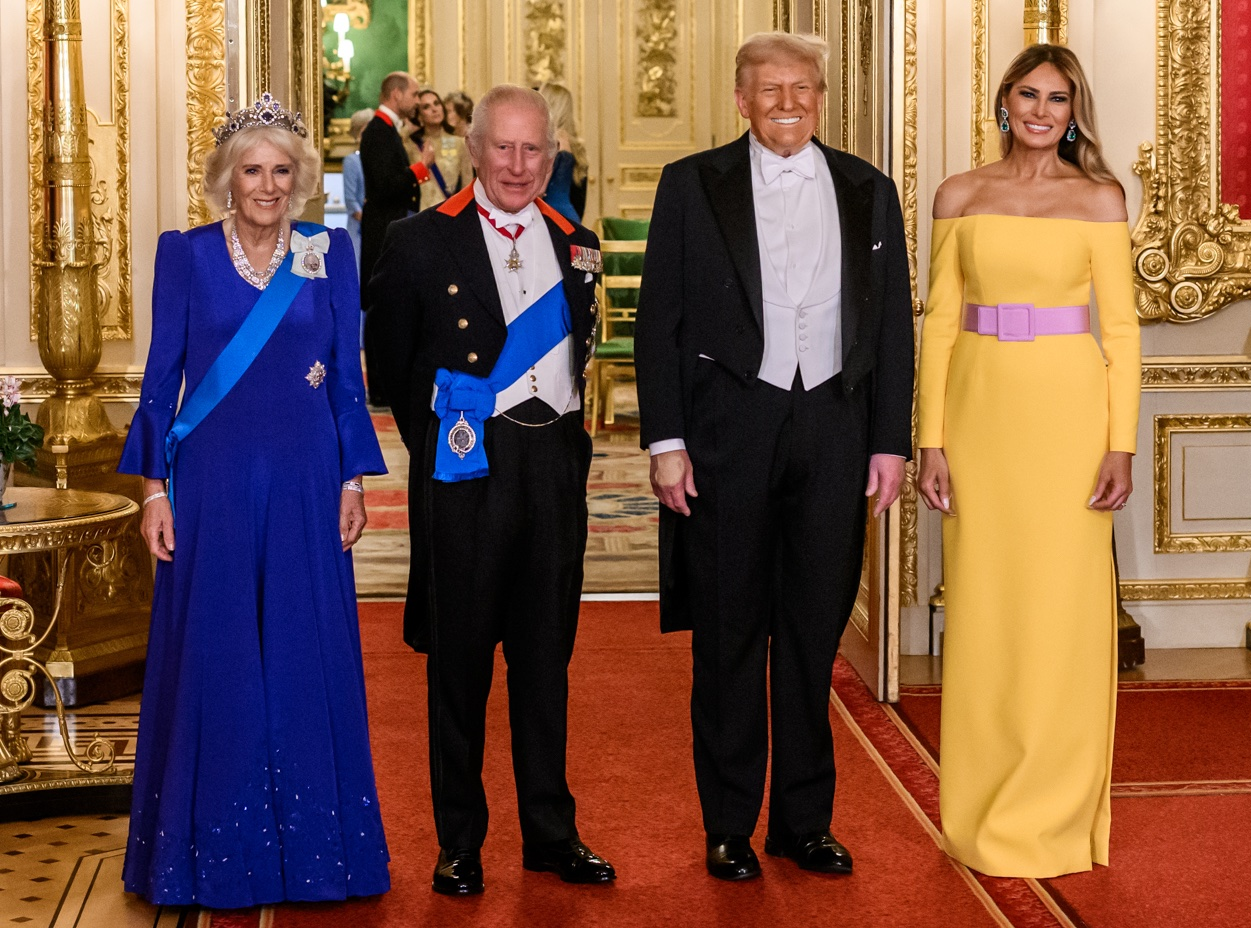
King Charles III and Queen Camilla hosted a state banquet for President Donald Trump and First Lady Melania Trump at Windsor Castle, 2025

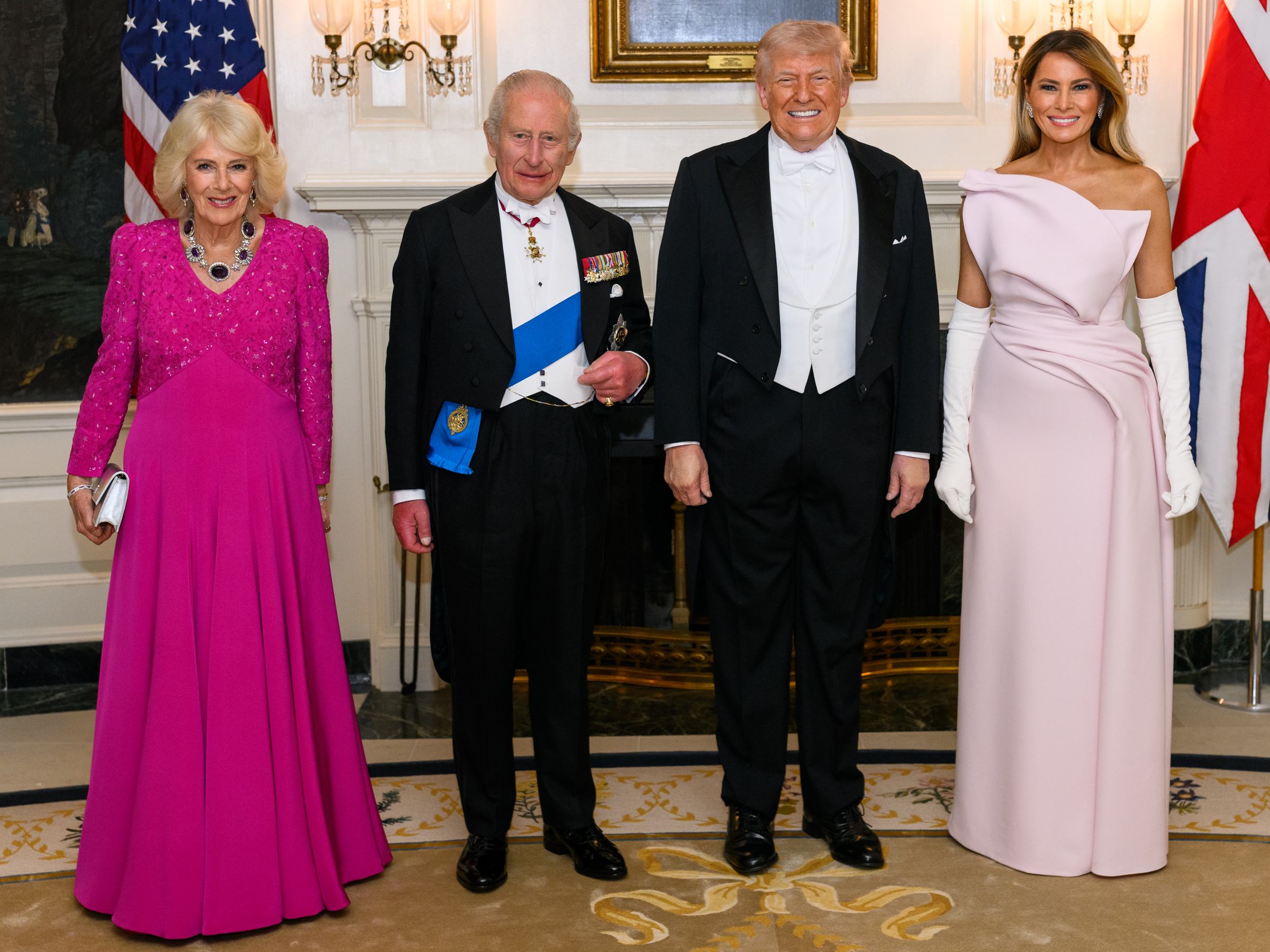
President Donald Trump and First Lady Melania Trump with King Charles III and Queen Camilla at the beginning of an official dinner at the White House, 2026

Prime Minister Andy Burnham and President Donald Trump conducting a bilateral meeting in New York City, 2026

== See also ==
- Anglophilia & Anglophobia
- Anti-Americanism
- Foreign policy of the United States
- Foreign relations of the United Kingdom
- Foreign relations of the United States
- Great Rapprochement
- List of ambassadors of the United Kingdom to the United States
- List of ambassadors of the United States to the United Kingdom
- Special Relationship (United Kingdom–United States)
- Timeline of British diplomatic history
- Timeline of United States diplomatic history
- Transatlantic relations
- UKUSA Agreement, on sharing secret intelligence
- United Kingdom–United States relations in World War II
- United Kingdom - United States Free Trade Agreement
- United States Air Force in the United Kingdom
- CIA activities in the United Kingdom
