= CIA activities in the United Kingdom =

There is a long history of close cooperation between the United States and the United Kingdom intelligence services; see Clandestine HUMINT and Covert Action for World War II and subsequent relationships. There are permanent liaison officers of each country in major intelligence agencies of the other, such as the Central Intelligence Agency (CIA) and the Secret Intelligence Service ("MI6") (which is the British counterpart of the CIA), FBI and the Security Service (MI5), and National Security Agency (NSA) and Government Communications Headquarters (GCHQ). From 1943 to 2017, the Open Source Enterprise, a division of the CIA, was run out of Caversham Park in Reading, Berkshire. American officials worked closely with their British counterparts to monitor foreign TV and radio broadcasts, as well as online information.

Oleg Penkovsky, a Soviet military intelligence colonel, who was a defector in place, was a joint US-UK espionage operation. Much of Penkovsky's product is available online at the CIA FOIA Reading Room under the code name IRONBARK.

A major source of tension between the two countries was Kim Philby, a senior UK SIS officer who was a Soviet agent. Philby, at one point, was the SIS liaison officer resident in the US. James Jesus Angleton, head of CIA counterintelligence, was surprised by Philby's activity, and, as a consequence, began hunts for moles within CIA.

In January 2014, newly released documents revealed that Margaret Thatcher had been warned while she was Prime Minister that the CIA did not always give sufficient notice in advance when it carried out operations in the UK. In 1984, Paddy Ashdown, who later became leader of the Liberal Democrats, raised fears about clandestine approaches made by CIA agents, but his allegations were dismissed by Thatcher.

== Labour Party ==
=== Harold Wilson ===
During the 1960s and 1970s, MI5 and the CIA's chief of counterintelligence, James Jesus Angleton, spied on Labour Prime Minister Harold Wilson because elements in those agencies claimed that Wilson was a Soviet agent or a blackmail risk.

As Peter Wright confirmed in his book Spycatcher, Wilson was the victim of a protracted, illegal campaign of destabilisation by a rogue element in the security services. Prompted by CIA fears that Wilson was a Soviet agent - put in place after the KGB had, the spooks believed, poisoned Hugh Gaitskell, the previous Labour leader - these MI5 men burgled the homes of the prime minister's aides, bugged their phones and spread black, anti-Wilson propaganda throughout the media. They tried to pin all kinds of nonsense on him: that his devoted political secretary, Marcia Williams, posed a threat to national security; that he was a closet IRA sympathiser. – The Guardian (2006)

=== 1983 general election ===
A series of CIA memos were released in January 2017 after a legal case by MuckRock, which promotes freedom of information. One memo was dated May 1983, shortly before the UK general election, and stated that the CIA was concerned about certain figures in the Labour Party, such as then-leader Michael Foot and deputy leader, Denis Healey, accusing them of "aping anti-American rhetoric". Titled "The British Labor Party: Caught Between Ideology and Reality", it cited Labour's then-commitment to trade "protectionism," withdrawal from the European Economic Community (later the European Union), and the dismantling of its Trident nuclear programme. Consequently, "a majority government headed by Labor [sic] would pose the most serious threat to US interests." The Labour Party "roundly criticizes US policy in the Third World, particularly in Latin America, and calls for ... improv[ing] relations with other socialist regimes."

=== Jeremy Corbyn ===
Jeremy Corbyn, who became a Labour MP in 1983 and was later elected leader of the party in 2015, was the subject of CIA interest due to his visit to Grenada in 1979.

[In 1984], Corbyn had come to the attention of the CIA as a Labour MP (for Islington North). He was critical of the U.S. invasion of Grenada, which had taken place in the previous year. In 1979, says the Spectator, Corbyn "went to Grenada with dignitaries of the Islington race relations and feminist industry, to see and admire the Revolution." Corbyn participated in a fact-finding mission, which claimed that most Grenadian working class people supported the revolution. In 1983, the US invaded to restore a political system favourable to its elite interests. A year later, the CIA noted the publication of a book written about the revolution in which, it says, the findings of Corbyn are quoted.

The CIA also kept tabs on Corbyn because of his support for the Salvadorian union, FENASTRAS. Notably, in a 1986 memo detailing FENASTRAS' conference in San Salvador, Corbyn's name was mentioned explicitly, whilst other foreign "union members" were not named.

In a letter inviting certain U.S. labor leaders to attend FENASTRAS' November 13-15 congress in San Salvador, [trade unionist Francisco] Acosta called FENASTRAS "democratic" in spite of its guerrilla and WFTU connections. British Labor M.P. Jeremy Corbyn and French, Australian, and Swiss union members also lent their names to [a FENASTRAS newspaper ad].

== British Pakistanis ==
In February 2009, journalist Tim Shipman revealed in The Spectator that the CIA was "running its own agent networks on an unprecedented scale in the British Pakistani community."

A British security source told me that somewhere between 40 and 60 per cent of CIA activity designed to prevent a new terrorist spectacular on American soil is now directed at targets in the UK. This is a quite staggering number. I ran the figure by several former CIA officers in the US, all of whom still have close links with the intelligence community. The consensus was that the 40 per cent figure is about right. 'If you're talking about total global operations, that would be an exaggeration,' one national security official said. 'If you're talking about operations to deal with threats against the US homeland, that's the ball park.' This has caused some tensions in what my old tutor Dr Chris Andrew, now the official historian of MI5, calls 'the most special part of the special relationship'. A former CIA officer who still does freelance work for the agency, said: 'Britain is an Islamist swamp. You don't want to have to spend time spying on your friends.'

As far as our closest ally is concerned, Britain is not part of the problem, Britain is the problem. Bruce Riedel, a former CIA officer and Middle East expert on the NSC for three presidents, who has just been appointed to head Barack Obama's overhaul of Afghan strategy, told me: 'The 800,000 or so British citizens of Pakistani origin are regarded by the American intelligence community as perhaps the single biggest threat environment that they have to worry about.'

In February 2019, the Intelligence and Security Committee unearthed a number of examples of GCHQ's intelligence being used to locate and detain terrorism suspects who were subsequently rendered and tortured during the 2000s as part of the war on terror. The committee also found that GCHQ provided intelligence to assist the interrogation of terrorism suspects held at CIA black sites.

== National Endowment for Democracy ==
In January 2022, former CIA agent-turned whistleblower, John Kiriakou revealed that the National Endowment for Democracy—a non-profit corporation created in the 1980s by President Ronald Reagan and funded by the United States Congress—had funnelled millions of dollars into British independent media groups since 2016. These include investigative outlets such as Bellingcat, Finance Uncovered and openDemocracy, as well as media freedom and training organisations like Index on Censorship, Article 19, the Media Legal Defence Initiative, and the Thomson Reuters Foundation.

In 2011, the US Congress changed the law that forbade the Executive Branch from propagandizing the American people or nationals of the other 'Five Eyes' countries—the UK, Canada, Australia, and New Zealand. The National Endowment for Democracy, like Radio Free Europe/Radio Liberty, countless Washington-area 'think tanks', and Radio/TV Martí, are the vehicles for that propaganda", referring to the US broadcaster that transmits to Cuba. Kiriakou continued: "And what better way to spread that propaganda than to funnel money to 'friendly' outlets in 'friendly countries'? The CIA's propaganda efforts throughout history have been shameless. But now that they're not legally relegated to just Russia and China, the whole world is a target." – Declassified UK

== See also ==
- 1953 Iranian coup d'état
- Inter-Services Intelligence activities in the United Kingdom
- CIA activities by country
