= Spare (memoir) =

2023 memoir by Prince Harry

- First edition
- Author: Prince Harry, Duke of Sussex
- Language: English
- Genre: Memoir
- Publisher: Penguin Random House
- Publication date: 10 January 2023
- Publication place: United States
- Media type: Print
- Pages: 416
- ISBN: 9780593593806

Spare is a memoir by Prince Harry, Duke of Sussex, which was released in 2023. It was ghostwritten by J. R. Moehringer and published by Penguin Random House. An audiobook edition is narrated by Harry.

The book was highly anticipated and was accompanied by several major broadcast interviews. The title refers to the aristocratic adage that an "heir and a spare" were needed to ensure that an inheritance remained in the family. In the book, Harry details his childhood and the profound effect of the death of his mother, Diana, Princess of Wales, as well as his teenage years, and subsequent deployment to Afghanistan with the British Army. He writes about his relationship with his older brother, Prince William, and his father, King Charles III, and his father's marriage to Queen Camilla, as well as his courtship of and marriage to the American actress Meghan Markle and the couple's subsequent stepping back from their royal roles.

Spare received generally mixed reviews from critics, some who praised Harry's openness but were critical of the inclusion of too many personal details. According to Guinness World Records, Spare became "the fastest selling non-fiction book of all time" on the date of its release.

== Background and writing ==
In July 2021, it was announced that Harry was set to publish a memoir via Penguin Random House, with proceeds from its sales going to charity and Harry reportedly earning an advance of at least $20 million. It is ghostwritten by journalist J. R. Moehringer. In the following month, he confirmed that $1.5 million of the proceeds from the memoir would go to the charity Sentebale, while £300,000 would be given to WellChild.

In the summer of 2021, Harry stated: "I'm writing this not as the prince I was born but as the man I have become. I've worn many hats over the years, both literally and figuratively, and my hope is that in telling my story – the highs and lows, the mistakes, the lessons learned – I can help show that no matter where we come from, we have more in common than we think." Harry said the book was "accurate and wholly truthful". The publisher stated that the book takes readers "immediately back to one of the most searing images of the 20th century: two young boys, two princes, walking behind their mother's coffin as the world watched in sorrow – and horror." The publisher maintained the book is "full of insight, revelation, self-examination, and hard-won wisdom."

The Times reported in January 2023 that Harry had second thoughts about publishing the book after visiting his grandmother Queen Elizabeth II during her Platinum Jubilee celebrations in the summer of 2022, but eventually went ahead with it. In an interview with Bryony Gordon, he stated that the first draft was 800 pages, meaning that he had enough material for two books, but it was reduced to about 400 pages because there were things between him and his father and brother "that I just don't want the world to know. Because I don't think they would ever forgive me." He claimed that the book's aim was "not trying to collapse the monarchy" but rather save it, and added that he felt he had an obligation to reform the institution for the sake of future spares, namely his brother's younger children, despite being told explicitly by William that his children are not Harry's responsibility.

== Synopsis ==
The book is Harry's account of his life to date. The title is a reference to the aristocratic adage that an "heir and a spare" were needed to ensure that the inheritance remained in the family if anything happened to the heir. The book is an autobiography, but he begins near the end, describing a meeting with his father and brother to discuss his plan to step back from his royal role. He then focuses on his education, his time in the British Army, and his relationship with his family and with his wife, Meghan.

=== Childhood and Diana's death ===
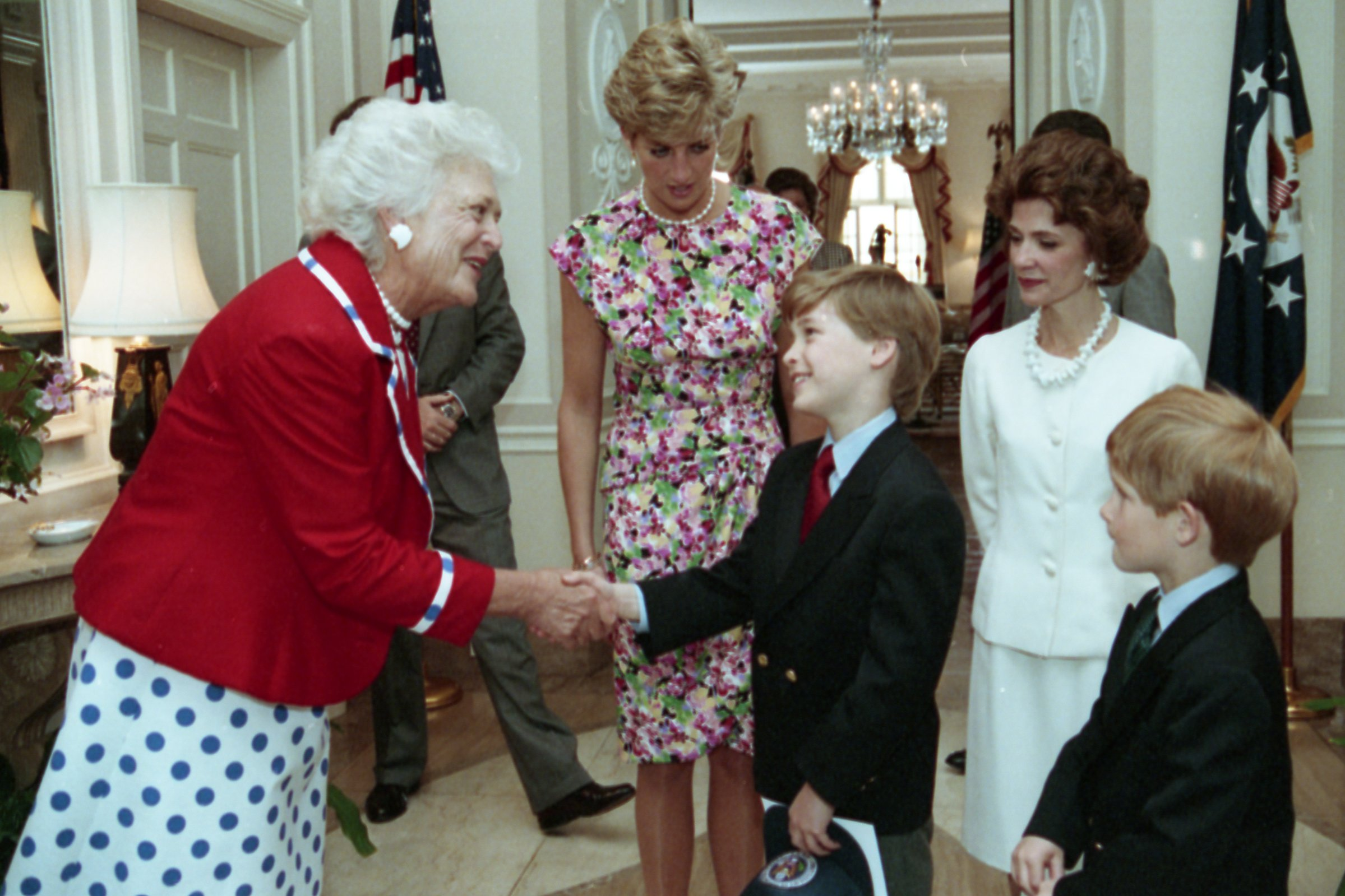
Harry (right) aged six, meeting Barbara Bush alongside his brother William and mother Diana

Harry describes his understanding of the role of "Spare" and his acceptance of it:

The Heir and the Spare—there was no judgment about it, but also no ambiguity. I was the shadow, the support, the Plan B. I was brought into the world in case something happened to Willy. I was summoned to provide backup, distraction, diversion and, if necessary, a spare part. Kidney, perhaps. Blood transfusion, Speck of bone marrow. This was all made explicitly clear to me from the start of life's journey and regularly reinforced thereafter. ... I took no offense. I felt nothing about it, any of it. Succession was like the weather, or the positions of the planets, or the turn of the seasons. ... Standing resolutely behind the people you loved, wasn't that the definition of honor? Of love? (p. 15)

In the book, Harry addresses and refutes the rumours that his father was not Charles, but one of his mother's lovers, James Hewitt. He believes that "one cause of the rumour was Major Hewitt's red hair, but another was sadism" fuelled by tabloids. He adds that even Charles joked about it once, which he thought was "in poor taste." He compares the dynamic between him and his older brother, William, as the spare and the heir, to that of his paternal great aunt Princess Margaret and grandmother Queen Elizabeth II. He mentions that he felt "nothing for [Margaret], except a bit of pity and a lot of jumpiness," and added that "she could kill a houseplant with one scowl." Harry mentions that at Ludgrove School, he took a liking to 'hot' matron Miss Roberts, but adds that another matron named Pat, who suffered from crooked knees and a stiff spine and whom he made fun of, did not "make us horny" as she was "small, mousy, frazzled."

Harry recounts about being informed about his mother's death early in the morning by his father when he was twelve years old. Harry states that the idea of having him and his brother walk behind their mother's coffin horrified several adults, in particular their maternal uncle Charles Spencer, 9th Earl Spencer. Harry also claimed that there were suggestions that William should walk behind the coffin alone, but Harry refused to allow it, as, had the roles been reversed, William would have done the same. He mentions that for 10 years he believed his mother was in hiding to escape press intrusion and alleges that his brother William also used to have those thoughts. He also discusses how the summary conclusion of investigations into their mother's death was "simplistic and absurd." He questions why the paparazzi that had been following her and why the people who sent them were not in prison, with a possible explanation being that it was all due to "corruption and cover-ups being the order of the day." Harry says that he and his brother were planning on issuing a statement to ask jointly for the investigation to be reopened but "those who decided dissuaded us." Harry mentions that during his trip to Paris for the 2007 Rugby World Cup semifinal, he had a man drive him through the same tunnel where his mother had died at 60 miles per hour (97 km/h), the speed with which Diana's car passed through the tunnel. Harry describes the decision as "ill-conceived" as it only brought him more pain. He later on admits that he asked for help from a spiritualist to connect with his mother.

=== Teenage years, drug use, and deployment to Afghanistan ===
In the memoir, Harry admits that he took cocaine at the age of 17, which he said, "wasn't very fun," but "it did make me feel different." He adds that he also took magic mushrooms at a party at Courteney Cox's house in January 2016 and "washed them down with tequila," after which he had hallucinations in a lavatory and talked to the bin and the toilet. He mentions how the editor of the News of the World, Rebekah Brooks, was adamant on publishing a story on his drug use. Harry describes her as a "loathsome toad" and "an infected pustule on the arse of humanity, plus a shit excuse for a journalist." Harry also discusses the "inglorious episode" of losing his virginity in a field behind a busy pub to "an older lady, who loved horses," who treated him "not unlike a young stallion." Harry also details out an episode at a bar where he "drank and drank and tried to pick up fights." He mentions that the bar staff threw him out, and at the hotel he "growled" at his bodyguard, "swung on him, slapped his head." After not getting a reaction, he mentions he "slapped him again" as "I was determined to hurt him."

Harry claims that his brother William and future sister-in-law Catherine suggested that he should choose a Nazi uniform over a pilot uniform for a "Native and Colonial" fancy dress party in 2005. He mentions that he "liked" Catherine the first time he saw her, describing her as "more sister than in-law" whom he liked seeing laugh. Detailing his tours of duty in Afghanistan, Harry states that he flew on six missions that killed 25 Taliban members, whom he did not view as "people," but instead as "chess pieces" that had been taken off the board. He adds that, "It's not a number that gave me any satisfaction. But neither was it a number that made me feel ashamed."

=== Relationship with Charles and Camilla, William's wedding, and Caroline Flack ===
Harry mentions that both he and his brother had agreed on welcoming Charles's lover Camilla into their family on the condition that their father did not marry her, but Charles was going ahead and Harry recognised that his father was finally going to be with the woman he loved. He alleges that Camilla "sacrificed" him "on her personal PR altar" to improve her own public image and leaked "minute details" of a conversation she had with William to the press. Harry also says that Charles and Camilla leaked news of his drug use in 2002 and sent him to a drug rehabilitation centre in order to garner sympathy for Charles as a father and for their relationship. He alleges that William "felt tremendous guilt" for not speaking up about their father's affair with Camilla, and he had "long harboured suspicions about the Other Woman." He adds that William was left "confused" and "tormented" as a result of the affair. Harry also says that Camilla had "played a role" in his mother's death because she had been "pivotal" in the disintegration of his parents' marriage. He likened his first time meeting her to "getting an injection" and added Camilla was "bored," partly because Harry was not Charles's heir and could not be a threat to her desires for marrying his father. Harry says that his father found happiness after marrying Camilla, and that he wanted both his father and Camilla to be happy, wondering if "she was less dangerous being happy." Harry also states that Camilla turned his bedroom at Clarence House into her dressing room as soon as he left. He also talks about Charles's experience at Gordonstoun, where Harry claims his father was bullied and "almost did not survive." He discusses his father's attachment to his teddy bear, which helped him through Gordonstoun and remained one of his favourite objects as an adult, a representation of "the essential loneliness of his childhood."

In the book, Harry describes his role as William's best man during his wedding in 2011 as a "bare-faced lie" as James Meade and Thomas van Straubenzee gave the wedding reception speech, which Harry felt was the right decision as he could have said "something wildly inappropriate." He also mentions that he had a frostbitten 'todger' (slang term for a penis) at the wedding following his trip to the North Pole and was advised to apply Elizabeth Arden cream to it, the smell of which reminded him of his mother. He also alleges that William was "tipsy" on rum hours before his wedding. In the memoir, Harry states that months after breaking up with Chelsy Davy he was introduced to Caroline Flack, whom he saw for a while before press intrusion "tainted" their relationship "irredeemably." He also denies having had a relationship with Cameron Diaz despite tabloid rumours. He mentions that Britons, who are "among the most literate people on the planet, were also the most credulous" when it came to believing tabloid rumours.

=== Relationship with Meghan and fatherhood ===
Harry states that on the day he had his first date with Meghan Markle, he was out at sea for a racing competition on a boat that had no toilet and he wet his pants. Harry mentions how he regretted searching for Meghan's sex scenes on Suits. He adds that during a confrontation with Meghan, he became "disproportionately, sloppily angry," after which she said she would not "tolerate" such behaviour and he needed to do therapy. He states his brother subsequently urged him to further examine his romance with Meghan as he believed the relationship was moving "too fast," though Harry believed their mother had helped him find Meghan. Harry writes that Meghan was asked by Queen Elizabeth II to select a tiara from her private collection for the wedding. He alleges that the Queen's dresser Angela Kelly would not lend them the tiara later on as it could not leave the palace without "an ordinance and police escort." He claims that after they tried to contact Kelly several times she "appeared out of thin air" to hand over a release form and give away the tiara but "her eyes were fire," which Harry interpreted as a "clear warning."

Harry claims there was a disagreement between Meghan and Catherine over flower girl dresses as Catherine felt her daughter Charlotte's dress needed to be completely remade four days before Harry and Meghan's wedding. Harry claims Catherine told Meghan via text that Charlotte had "cried" when she tried on the dress because it was "too big, long and baggy," before being reminded by Meghan, who had taken a day to respond, that she was dealing with her father, who was ill and not going to attend the wedding. Catherine agreed to take Charlotte to Meghan's tailor and Harry alleges that he found Meghan sobbing on the floor once he got home. Harry states Catherine meant no harm and then claims that she visited them the next day with flowers and a card to make amends. Harry recalls a discussion about the timing of the wedding rehearsal, which involved his future wife allegedly telling his sister-in-law Catherine, who had recently given birth to her youngest child, that she must be suffering from "baby brain because of her hormones" as she had forgotten a detail about the rehearsal timing. He claims Meghan apologised at a reconciliatory tea at Kensington Palace in June 2018. Harry also blames his father and stepmother's household for giving away the story about Meghan and Catherine's argument to the press.

Harry talks about two signs that hinted he was going to have a child. The first involved Meghan singing to a group of singing seals, who, he claimed, sang back. The second one involved Meghan taking two at-home pregnancy tests and placing the wands on his bedside table, where he kept "the blue box with my mother's hair." Harry mentions that at that moment he thought: "Right, I thought, good. Let's see what Mummy can do with this situation." Upon learning that they were expecting their first child, Harry mentions that he thanked "selkies" and "Mummy." He also confirms that they announced the pregnancy to other members of his family on the day of his cousin Princess Eugenie's wedding in October 2018. He later on mentions that while his wife was giving birth, he used a canister of laughing gas to "enhance my calm." Harry also talks about Meghan's miscarriage in 2020 and how they left the hospital with their "unborn child" in "a tiny package." He adds that they went to "a secret place" where, "under a spreading banyan tree," he dug a hole with his hands and buried the child.

=== Stepping back from royal role ===
The book also details a confrontation between Harry and his brother William at Nottingham Cottage in 2019, which Harry claims happened during a visit by his brother who wanted to talk about "the whole rolling catastrophe" of their relationship. Harry claims that William complained about Meghan, whom he allegedly described as "difficult", "rude" and "abrasive". Harry calls his brother's grievances a "parrot[ing of] the press narrative" about his wife. The two resorted to exchanging insults, with Harry dismissing William's claim that he was trying to help. Once they were in the kitchen, Harry alleges that William "grabbed me by the collar, ripping my necklace, and he knocked me to the floor. I landed on the dog's bowl, which cracked under my back, the pieces cutting into me." Harry claims that he refused to hit back despite William urging him to do so. He claims that while leaving, William looked "regretful, and apologised". He adds that he called his therapist and that upon learning about the incident, Meghan "was terribly sad".

In the book, Harry states that his father wondered if Meghan wanted to continue her acting career as they did not "have money to spare". Charles went on to support the couple until their departure from the UK, but Harry states that his father's main fear was Meghan's popularity, which could overshadow him. Harry also claims that Charles and Camilla did not like William and Catherine "getting too much publicity" either. He then mentions how he did not expect to lose his state-funded security after stepping back from his royal role as his uncle Andrew who was "accused of the sexual assault of a young woman" was allowed to keep his. He claims that the Sandringham Summit was a "fix" by private secretaries of the royal household, "three middle-aged white men" who had consolidated power through "bold Machiavellian manoeuvre", whom he refers to as "the Bee" (Sir Edward Young), "the Wasp" (Clive Alderton), and "the Fly" (Simon Case).

Harry also recounts another tense meeting with Charles and William following the funeral of his grandfather Prince Philip in April 2021, where Charles stated "Please, boys. Don't make my final years a misery." Harry describes William as "my dear brother, my archnemesis", before pointing out how for the first time he noticed his "alarming" baldness and how his resemblance to his mother was fading. Harry mentions that during a walk with his father and brother, William wondered why he had not come to them when having issues within the institution, before adding that he should take up his complaints about the Megxit agreement "with Granny". Harry mentions that he was disgusted by his brother's response, but William lunged, and told him he loved him and "I swear to you now on Mummy's life that I just want you to be happy." Harry stated in the book that he did not believe what his brother said.

After being refused permission to be buried at Althorp next to his mother in the event of his death, Harry mentions that he has chosen the Frogmore estate as his burial site.

== Release ==
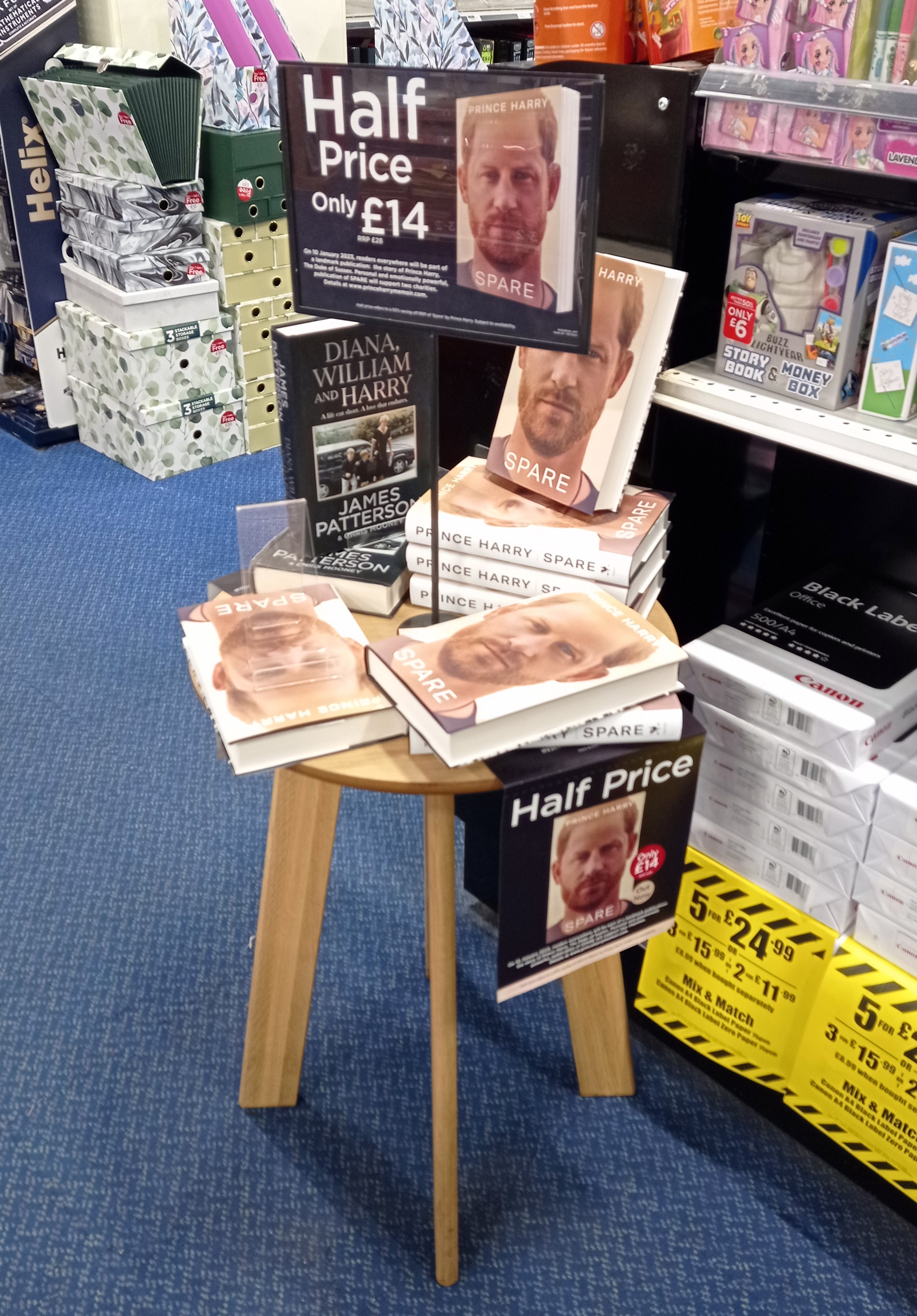
Spare on sale in London, 14 January 2023

The memoir was officially published on 10 January 2023, having been translated into fifteen languages (German, Dutch, Danish, Swedish, French, Italian, Spanish, European Portuguese, Brazilian Portuguese, Romanian, Polish, Greek, Hungarian, Finnish, and Chinese). It was priced at £28 at launch, but in November 2022 major booksellers were announcing it at half that price, leading to criticism by small booksellers who would not be able to match the discounted price. Five days ahead of its official release date, the Spanish edition En La Sombra (In The Shadow) was accidentally sold in some bookstores in Spain but was hurriedly withdrawn from sale.

Harry had three broadcast interviews to promote the book, all of which were filmed in California. An interview with Harry by Anderson Cooper on 60 Minutes was broadcast on 8 January, as was an interview by Tom Bradby titled Harry: The Interview on ITV1. A third interview by Michael Strahan on Good Morning America and a special titled Prince Harry: In His Own Words, were broadcast on 9 January on ABC. All three broadcasters asked the palace for comments about claims made in the interviews, but declined to provide them with the footage due to their respective network policies. Harry then appeared on The Late Show with Stephen Colbert on 10 January. He also sat down for exclusive interviews with People magazine, and with Bryony Gordon for The Telegraph.

Advance clips from the interviews saw Harry telling Cooper that "Every single time I've tried to do it privately, there have been briefings and leakings and planting of stories against me and my wife" and that "The family motto is 'never complain, never explain', but it's just a motto ... [Buckingham Palace] will feed or have a conversation with a correspondent, and that correspondent will literally be spoon-fed information and write the story, and at the bottom of it, they will say they have reached out to Buckingham Palace for comment. But the whole story is Buckingham Palace commenting. So when we're being told for the past six years, 'we can't put a statement out to protect you', but you do it for other members of the family, there becomes a point when silence is betrayal". It was pointed out by the Express that the part in which Harry describes silence as betrayal was taken from a quote by Martin Luther King Jr. without giving attribution. In the interview with Bradby, Harry said that he "would like to get my father back, I would like to have my brother back" and that "I want a family, not an institution", adding that "they feel as though it is better to keep us somehow as the villains" and that "they have shown absolutely no willingness to reconcile." Sources close to King Charles III responded to the claims by insisting that he loves both of his sons and has kept communication channels open throughout the last few years, despite their relationship being occasionally tense. The two have also reportedly remained in contact and met several times during Queen Elizabeth II's Platinum Jubilee celebrations in June 2022. In the interview with Strahan, Harry stated "I don't think that we can ever have peace with my family unless the truth is out there."

== Reception ==
=== Sales ===
Spare sold more than 1.4 million copies in all formats in the US, Canada and the UK on its first day, which was described by Penguin Random House as the largest first-day sales total for any nonfiction book it ever published. The book broke the Guinness World Record for the fastest-selling non-fiction book of all time, which was previously held by Barack Obama's A Promised Land (2020). Total book sales, including hardcover, audio and e-books editions, were around 400,000 copies in the United Kingdom during its first day, making it the country's fastest-selling non-fiction book ever. Despite having a recommended retail price of £28 in the UK and $36 in the US, many retailers, including Waterstones and WHSmith, as well as Amazon were selling it at half price.

The book sold more than 3.2 million copies across all formats worldwide in its first week of publication, 1.6 million of which were in the US alone. In the UK, a total of 467,183 print copies and 750,000 copies across all formats were sold in its first week, becoming the fastest-selling nonfiction book in the UK since Nielsen BookData began recording official printed book sales in 1998. The record was previously held by Kay Allinson's Pinch of Nom cookbook, which sold 210,506 copies in its first three days of release in 2019. Spare also sold 20,584 copies in its first week in Ireland, becoming the fastest selling non-fiction book in Ireland since records began 20 years ago and overtaking Paul O'Connell's autobiography The Battle. The book also sold 64,150 print copies and 55,850 audio and eBook copies in Australia in its first week, becoming the fastest-selling memoir since records began in 2002 and overtaking Darren Lockyer's autobiography. In France, the book sold 150,000 units in less than two months. It was the 13th best-selling book of 2023 in the country with 247,000 sales.

According to Publishers Weekly in August 2024, Spare was number 3 on its 2023 best-sellers list, and its publisher reported over 6 million copies sold worldwide.

=== Critical response ===
In The New Yorker, Rebecca Mead opines that Spare is "worth reading not just for its headline-generating details but also for its narrative force, its voice, and its sometimes surprising wit . . . [a]bove all, [the book] is worth reading for its potential historical import". Writing for The Guardian, Charlotte Higgins believed the memoir was "compassion-inducing, frustrating, oddly compelling and absurd", and added that Harry was "simultaneously loathing and locked into the tropes of tabloid storytelling, the style of which his ghostwritten autobiography echoes." In her review for The New York Times, Alexandra Jacobs thought that "Spare is all over the map — emotionally as well as physically. He does not, in other words, keep it tight." She added that Harry "seems both driven mad by 'the buzz,'... and constitutionally unable to stop drumming it up."

The Independent gave Spare a rating of four out of five stars, with Lucia Pavia writing "the Duke of Sussex hits his stride on paper in this breathtakingly frank book." Also writing for The Independent, Jessie Thompson believed that the book's content was "horrifyingly personal" and "too private" and added that "The joke that Harry has broken his silence – 'again' – is turning into a cliché. This is the opposite of silence; a constant cacophony." Writing for the same newspaper, Tom Peck argued that readers could not take Harry's arguments seriously when making those arguments "also makes you a hundred million dollars or more". He also claimed that if Harry complains about press intrusion and security "he should simply shut up and not continue feeding the beast he claims to loathe". He believed that with the book, Harry had shown "That his family is a neurotic mess, that it is in what he calls a mutually parasitic relationship with the tabloid press, and that he has – seemingly deliberately – made it almost impossible to make peace with them again."

While saying that Harry ultimately "shares too much" about certain topics in the book, Henry Mance for the Financial Times responded to the criticism that Harry's choice to speak about his life contradicts his request for privacy, saying "someone can demand you don't set fire to their garden, even when they are having a bonfire. Warren Buffett has pledged to give away his fortune, but you're not entitled to take his car without asking." Mance said Spare is "arguably...the most insightful royal book in a generation". In her review for The Telegraph, Anita Singh gave the book three out of five stars and thought it was "well-constructed and fluently written". She argued that the book's focus was primarily on the relationship between Harry and his mother Diana from whose loss he has not recovered.

In his review for The Times, James Marriott labelled the book "a 400-page therapy session for mystic Harry" who "was looking for an escape route, a way to blow up his coddled, caged panda bear life", while his wife Meghan is shown "with her talent for victimhood and offence". Writing for Press Gazette, Dominic Ponsford believed that Harry had "not only breached the privacy of his family members but also significantly undermined his own future right to privacy." He argued that the book "leaves very little off-limits when it comes to future press coverage of Harry's private life." He mentioned that Harry could be sued by his family for breach of privacy, citing the 2006 McKennitt v Ash case which showed that "those in close family relationships owe a duty of confidence to each other."

The BBC's royal correspondent Sean Coughlan called the book the "weirdest book ever written by a royal", and "part-confession, part-rant and part-love letter". He also described it as "disarmingly frank and intimate – showing the sheer weirdness of [Harry's] often isolated life", adding "it's the small details, rather than the set-piece moments that give a glimpse of how little we really knew." In a review for Sky News, Katie Spencer wrote that in the book "There are moments where your heart breaks, when he talks of desperately wanting to be hugged – but then there are petulant musings, immature bragging and catty explanations, making it a little hard to stay on Harry's side." She adds that Harry has shared some personal details that "quite frankly, we didn't need to know" and make the book "both tender and bizarrely unrelatable".

In November 2023, Time included Spare in its list of "The 100 Must-Read Books of 2023".

=== Afghanistan comments ===
Harry's remarks in the book that he had killed 25 Taliban fighters prompted some Twitter users in Afghanistan to brand him a "murderer" and a "crusader". Abdul Qahar Balkhi, the spokesperson for the Taliban led regime in Afghanistan's Ministry of Foreign Affairs, responded to the claims via a statement: "The western occupation of Afghanistan is truly an odious moment in human history and comments by Prince Harry is a microcosm of the trauma experienced by Afghans at the hands of occupation forces who murdered innocents without any accountability." Taliban commander Molavi Agha Gol described Harry as a "big mouth loser who has been trying to get attention", and added that Harry was "scared to go to a combat zone". Khalid Zadran, a Taliban official, stated that "criminals like Harry who proudly confess their crimes will be brought to the court table in front of the international community." Zadran condemned Harry's "cruel and barbaric actions" in taking "lives of dozens of defenseless Afghans". Uaqab Afghan, a Taliban director in the Ministry of Mines and Petroleum, believed Harry was lucky to have "survived" and wondered if international justice groups would react to "Prince Harry's atrocities against humanity in Afghanistan". Taliban propagandist Anas Haqqani criticised Harry for comparing his opponents to chess pieces, stating "The ones you killed were not chess pieces, they were humans. They had families who were waiting for their return." He also stated "We checked and found that the days on which Prince Harry is mentioning the killing of 25 mujaheddin, we did not have any casualties in Helmand. It is clear that civilians and ordinary people were targeted."

American-Palestinian journalist Ali Abunimah reacted to Harry's statements by stating that he is a "monstrous murderous psycho" and called for him to be extradited to Afghanistan to face criminal charges. Andrew Neil described the remarks as "a nightmare – an absolute nightmare – for his security teams. How stupid can you be?" Mark Borkowski was also critical of him giving away his track record in Afghanistan, stating "He's put a target on his back and if he's protecting his family, he's put them in the greatest danger because I don't believe they've got the same level of security he would have enjoyed while he was a member of the royal family." Conservative MP Bob Stewart questioned why Harry would share such details with the public, stating "Real soldiers tend to shy away. People I know don't boast about such things. They rather regret that they have had to do it."

Colonel Tim Collins reacted to the revelations by stating "That's not how you behave in the army; it's not how we think. Harry has now turned against the other family, the military, that once embraced him, having trashed his birth family." He added that Harry was "pursuing US identity politics and casting slurs or racism around where none exists."

Colonel Richard Kemp believed that Harry's "words will be fed into Jihadist propaganda to carry out attacks against the UK". Kemp was also critical of Harry's description of military training with the British Army as he claimed the Army had "trained me to 'other' them, and they had trained me well." Kemp said "The idea that soldiers are trained to see the enemy as chess pieces to be swiped off the board is wrong. It's not how we trained people. It's potentially damaging to say this and the Taliban has exploited his words to accuse him of war crimes."

Lord Darroch, former National Security Adviser, stated that "he would have advised against" Harry giving away such details. Lord West of Spithead, former head of the Royal Navy, called Harry "very stupid" for publishing his claims and stated that there could be "serious security issues" for veterans at the upcoming Invictus Games, which Harry founded. Tobias Ellwood, the chairman of the Defence Select Committee and former British Army captain, warned of the "security repercussions", while former defence secretary Lord Hutton of Furness believed that speaking about how many people he had killed "diminishes him." General Sir Richard Barrons, the former Deputy Chief of the Defence Staff, stated that "there are things that happen on the battlefield and there's no great advantage in saying anything public." Retired Royal Navy officer Chris Parry reacted to the claims by stating that he had never heard a colleague "say what their score is. I'm afraid to say it's clumsy, tasteless and does not afford respect to the people who have been killed."

Former British Army captain Mike Crofts noted that Harry's comments were "both unwise but also counter the unspoken code of the UK armed forces", and added that "discussing kill counts openly often suggests that someone is processing a large amount of trauma linked to their service and possibly before it." He concluded that Harry had adverse childhood experiences (ACEs), which include "parental drug and alcohol addiction, abuse, neglect – and, significantly, the loss of a parent – all constitute trauma and adverse experience in childhood." Retired former senior intelligence officer Philip Ingram believed Harry showed signs of post-traumatic stress disorder (PTSD).

Pen Farthing, a British former Royal Marines commando and founder of the Nowzad Dogs charity, was evacuated from Kabul on 6 January 2023 following the publishing of Harry's claims. The move was done to avoid "potential reprisal attacks on ex-forces people."

Protests about the deaths of the 25 people killed by Harry broke out at a university in Helmand Province on 8 January 2023.

During the book launch interviews with US TV stations in New York, Harry was accompanied by someone who appeared to be carrying a pistol case. In response to the criticism, Harry stated "expressing and detailing" his experience was necessary for his "healing journey", while "silence has been the least effective remedy". He condemned pre-publication leaks that quoted the book out of context and denied "boasting" about his number of kills. Author and psychologist Jessica Taylor believed speaking openly about trauma could help with normalising and validating the feelings and experiences, adding that when it is done by people in the public eye in a non-medical and non-stigmatising way "it helps people to realise that their own responses to trauma are also normal, natural and justified."

Another adverse reaction to the statement about Taliban came from the Iranian government. After the UK government condemned the execution of Iranian British dual national Alireza Akbari, who had been accused by the Iranian government of spying for MI6, the Iranian Foreign Ministry issued a statement, saying "The British regime, whose royal family member, sees the killing of 25 innocent people as removal of chess pieces and has no regrets over the issue, and those who turn a blind eye to this war crime, are in no position to preach others on human rights."

In February 2023, UK defence secretary Ben Wallace reacted to Harry's statements on an LBC radio programme and said "The armed forces is not about a tally. I frankly think boasting about tallies or talking about tallies … distorts the fact that the army is a team game."

Russian conceptual artist Andrei Molodkin projected images of a sculpture filled with blood on to St Paul's Cathedral and covered 25 copies of Spare with human blood donated by Afghans in protest at Harry's actions and comments. Profits from the sale of the books were donated to Afghan charities.

=== Discussions on mental health ===
In the book, Harry claims that following a physical altercation with his brother in 2019, he did not contact his wife but immediately called his therapist. Journalist Daniel Bird claimed that this contradicted the comments Meghan had made earlier about not being allowed to get help for her psychological issues: "Prince Harry said he called his therapist right after a fight with the Prince of Wales... but didn't Meghan say she wasn't allowed to speak to a therapist while she was a working royal? Seems odd Harry was allowed and she wasn't..." Writing for The Independent, Meredith Clark praised Harry for contacting his therapist after the altercation, stating that it would help with breaking the stigma surrounding men that are ashamed to ask for mental help. Lisa Turner, a trauma therapist, said that Harry wrote the memoir as he was "hurting".

Harry, who has been a mental health advocate, was called a hypocrite by sources close to his father Charles and his sister-in-law Catherine for undermining their mental health in his book by talking about Charles's hard time at Gordonstoun and Catherine's mental state after giving birth to her youngest child. One source said "It is hypocritical for him to talk about other people's mental health. The King may have spoken about his troubles at Gordonstoun in public, but it's not for Harry to go into all that. The problem is he just doesn't have any grown-ups advising him." According to The Telegraph, sources close to Harry's late grandmother Elizabeth II said that Harry's repeated "ambushing" of the royal family had an impact on her health and "did take its toll. At that stage in your life and your reign, you just don't need that on top of everything else."

In the book Harry discussed his relationship with Caroline Flack and speculated that she had taken her life because of "The relentless abuse at the hands of the press, year after year" which "had finally broken her". Flack's former publicist, Alex Mullen, wrote that Harry was "parroting media reports" about Flack's death "as if they're reality". He also suggested that he and his wife Meghan should instead reflect on how they "might have caused Queen Elizabeth II pain just as she lost her husband of 70 years and while she was on the path to her final goodbye."

=== Political response ===
When questioned in an interview if the public can have faith in the monarchy following "allegations of fighting and betrayal at the top", UK prime minister Rishi Sunak responded "I think the public like me have enormous regard for the Royal Family, they're deeply proud of them... When I get to go around the world and champion Britain as an amazing country with so many things that we can be proud of, our institutions including the royal family are one of those." Patti Davis, daughter of Nancy and Ronald Reagan, who had previously written a similar tell all book during her father's presidency, discouraged Harry, saying: "My justification in writing a book I now wish I hadn't written (…) was very similar to what I understand to be Harry's reasoning. I wanted to tell the truth, I wanted to set the record straight. Naïvely, I thought if I put my own feelings and my own truth out there for the world to read, my family might also come to understand me better."

=== Public opinion ===
In January 2023 and ahead of the release of Spare, Harry's popularity in the UK fell even further according to a survey by YouGov, with almost two-thirds of the participants having a negative view of him. This was a further decline from the results in May 2022 when roughly half the population viewed him negatively. Now, only a quarter of those surveyed viewed him in a positive light. In another poll, 68 per cent of respondents held a negative view of Harry compared to 21 per cent who had a favourable opinion. Among people aged over 65 he and his wife Meghan were the least popular royals. One in five people said they believed Harry's stated motivation for releasing the book, but nearly twice as many (41 per cent) believed he was trying to make money.

== Veracity of claims ==
Harry said that "Whatever the cause, my memory is my memory, it does what it does, gathers and curates as it sees fit, and there's just as much truth in what I remember and how I remember it as there is in so-called objective facts."

In the book, Harry claimed that his stepmother Camilla had leaked details of her private conversation with his brother William to the press. Speaking to The Telegraph, sources close to Camilla mentioned that she was not behind the leak and was "furious" when she discovered that details of her first meeting with William were published in the press. She had discussed the meeting with her aide Amanda MacManus whose husband, a media executive, shared the information with a former colleague, who in turn leaked the story to a newspaper. Camilla released a public statement at the time, announcing that MacManus had "resigned" following an investigation. In response to Harry's claim that Camilla had played "the long game" with "a campaign aimed at marriage, and eventually the crown," Camilla's son and Harry's stepbrother Tom Parker Bowles stated "I think change happens but I don't care what anyone says – this wasn't any sort of end game. She married the person she loved and this is what happened." The BBC's former royal correspondent Jennie Bond mentioned that she had tried to establish a relationship with Camilla but failed because Camilla stated that she had "no interest in cultivating a special relationship with any journalist."

Speaking to The Sunday Times, a former royal aide called into question Harry's account of how he chose a Nazi costume for a party, as he was one of the people responsible for handling the fallout and had spoken to Harry at the time. He stated, "There was no mention to any advisers at the time that it was William and Kate's idea or they thought it was hilariously funny. That recollection did not exist at the time, contemporaneously." Another friend called Harry's claim "bullshit" and added that it had nothing to do with William and Catherine. In response to Harry's supposed resentment at not giving the best man speech at his brother's wedding reception, a close friend of the brothers said "Harry didn't want to be best man, he kept saying for months it should be Thomas and James because they were William's best mates."

Harry claims that he learned about Queen Elizabeth The Queen Mother's death in 2002 via a phone call while he was at Eton, but records show that he along with his father and brother were on vacation in Switzerland when the news broke out. An acquaintance of Harry's father, who was with them on the ski trip, said Harry's account in the book was "rubbish" as he "was definitely in Klosters, he was here with the prince [his father]."

Harry claims that his stepmother Camilla suggested that he could become the governor-general of Bermuda, but as a British Overseas Territory and not a Commonwealth realm, Bermuda has a governor and not a governor-general. Harry's claims that he learned about Queen Elizabeth II's death via the BBC website were called into question, as The Telegraph had reported that his father informed him personally about the monarch's death via a phone call five minutes before the public announcement. In a piece for The Telegraph, Camilla Tominey stated that the original story in the newspaper about Meghan and Catherine's argument before their wedding was a balanced 1,200-word feature that read: "The Telegraph has spoken to two separate sources who claim Kate was left in tears following a bridesmaids dress fitting for Princess Charlotte." She added that it was The Sun who ran with the headline "Meghan Made Kate Cry" with a piece written by Jack Royston, who later joined Newsweek as chief royal correspondent and became known for his favourable columns on the Sussexes. Tominey added that in contrast to Harry implying that it was only Catherine who complained about the dress, members of the staff at the time were informed that Meghan had personally aired grievances about the ill-fitting dresses and other mothers were angry too. She also adds that Catherine went to personally meet with Meghan about the matter, and it was Meghan who informed Catherine's staff that she had "left in tears" in a bid to help smooth things over. In the book, Harry claims that "rumours and lies" originating from staff who were choosing between "Team Cambridge and Team Sussex" poisoned the atmosphere. He also claims that in such circumstances the employees could not even tolerate "constructive criticism" and went on to accuse William's staff of "backstabbing" and "setting our two groups of staff against each other", whereas Meghan "spread kindness" with baskets of food and flowers and "hosted tea parties and ice-cream socials". Tominey pointed out that when an ice cream van was brought to Kensington Palace, Meghan allegedly gave strict instructions that it should only offer service to the Sussexes' crew and not the Cambridges, their staff or their children. A former employee claimed that Meghan's generosity made her unpleasant behaviour even harder to manage: "One minute she'd be buying you flowers, the next she'd be blanking you." Jason Knauf, the communications secretary for the Cambridges and Sussexes, had formally complained about Meghan's behaviour, stating that she "was able to bully two PAs out of the household in the past year... The Duchess seems intent on always having someone in her sights. She is bullying X and seeking to undermine her confidence." He also described the couple's tour of Australia, New Zealand, Fiji, and Tonga as "very challenging" and "made worse by the behaviour of the Duchess", though Meghan vehemently denied bullying anyone.

Dickie Arbiter, the former press secretary for Queen Elizabeth II, demanded an apology from Penguin Random House after a passage in the book claimed "the Queen's ex-press secretary" was among a group of royal commentators described as the "Fleet Street jury" and had stated Harry and his wife should "expect no mercy" after stepping back from their royal role. Arbiter stated "While I am not mentioned by name – referencing 'the Queen's ex-press secretary' – it is by association that by being the only former courtier regularly contacted by the media, the author is pointing the finger at me." He denied being "a part of 'jury' and I certainly would not use words like 'expect no mercy'", before asking for an acknowledgement from Penguin Random House. The Times later reported that the comments the book referred to were made by Sir Trevor Phillips, the former chairman of the Equality and Human Rights Commission.

In response to the criticism, J. R. Moehringer shared quotes from Harry on Twitter suggesting that he had tried to remember the events to the best of his ability.

In the book, Harry claimed that he wanted to "confront" Paul Burrell, his mother's butler, after he had penned a tell-all following her death. However, in his witness statement to a court in June 2023 he said he "was firmly against meeting him". When asked about the contradiction, he replied "I cannot remember whether I wanted a meeting or not".

In a 2026 biography of William and Catherine by Russell Myers, titled William & Catherine: The Intimate Inside Story, sources close to William denied Harry's account of a physical fight with his brother, stating: "It was a cheap shot [from Harry] to present such an argument. Tensions were running very high, and yes, there certainly were cross words exchanged that on reflection were regrettable, but the prince [William] is adamant there was no physical violence."

== In popular culture ==
The book and its content are parodied in a 2023 episode of South Park titled "The Worldwide Privacy Tour", which sees the Prince of Canada and his wife, based on Harry and Meghan, go on a book tour to promote his memoir Waaagh and to demand privacy amid their bashing the monarchy. A parody version of the book published by Little, Brown and Company and titled Spare Us! A Harrody went on sale in April 2023. The memoir was referenced by Lovehoney in their "spare" ball gag advertisements with the text "Silence is golden, Harry."

== See also ==
- List of British royal memoirs
