= Pakistan–United Kingdom relations =

- Pakistan: United Kingdom

Diplomatic mission
- High Commission of Pakistan, London: British High Commission, Islamabad

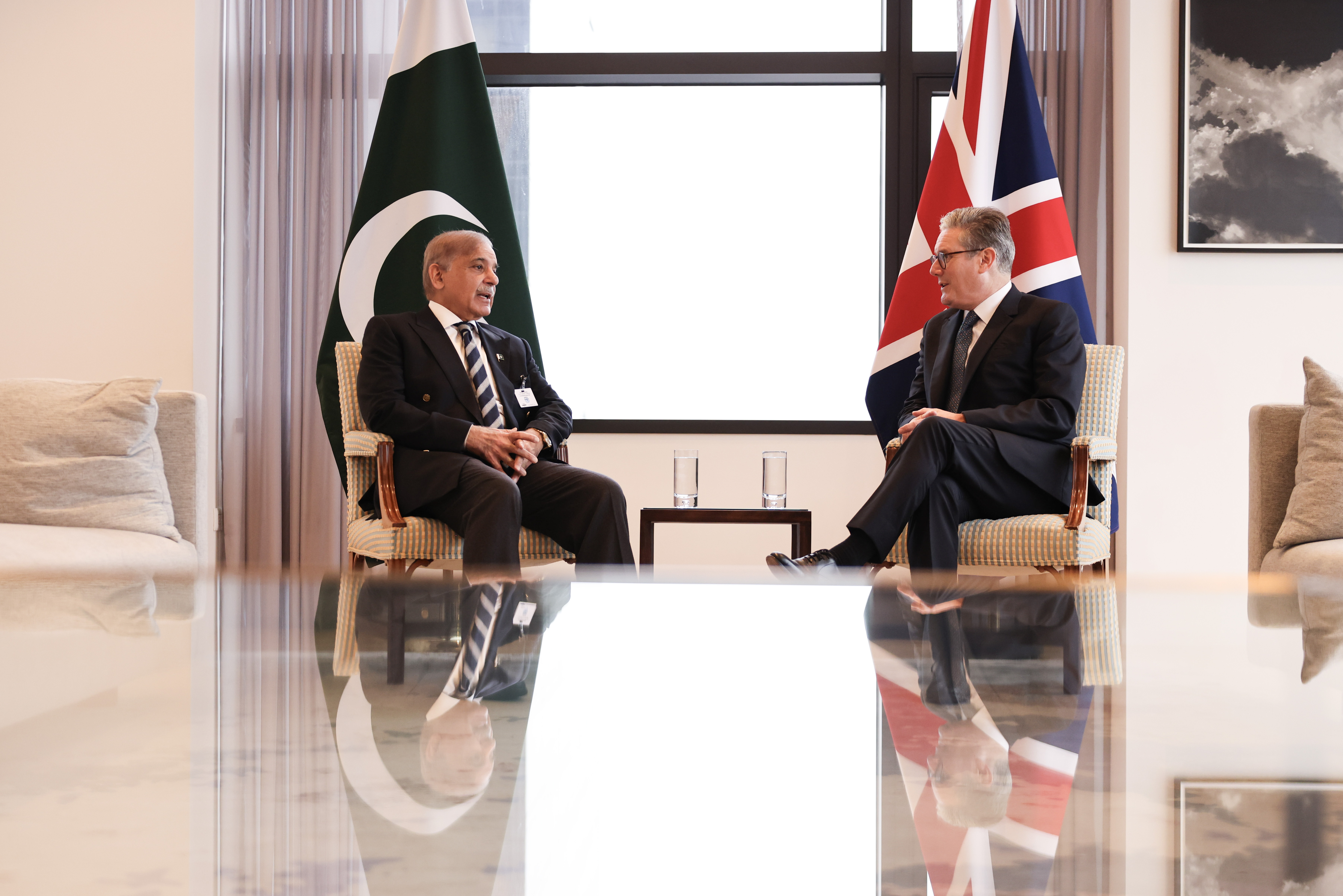
Pakistani Prime Minister Shehbaz Sharif with British Prime Minister Keir Starmer at a United Nations General Assembly in New York City, September 2024.

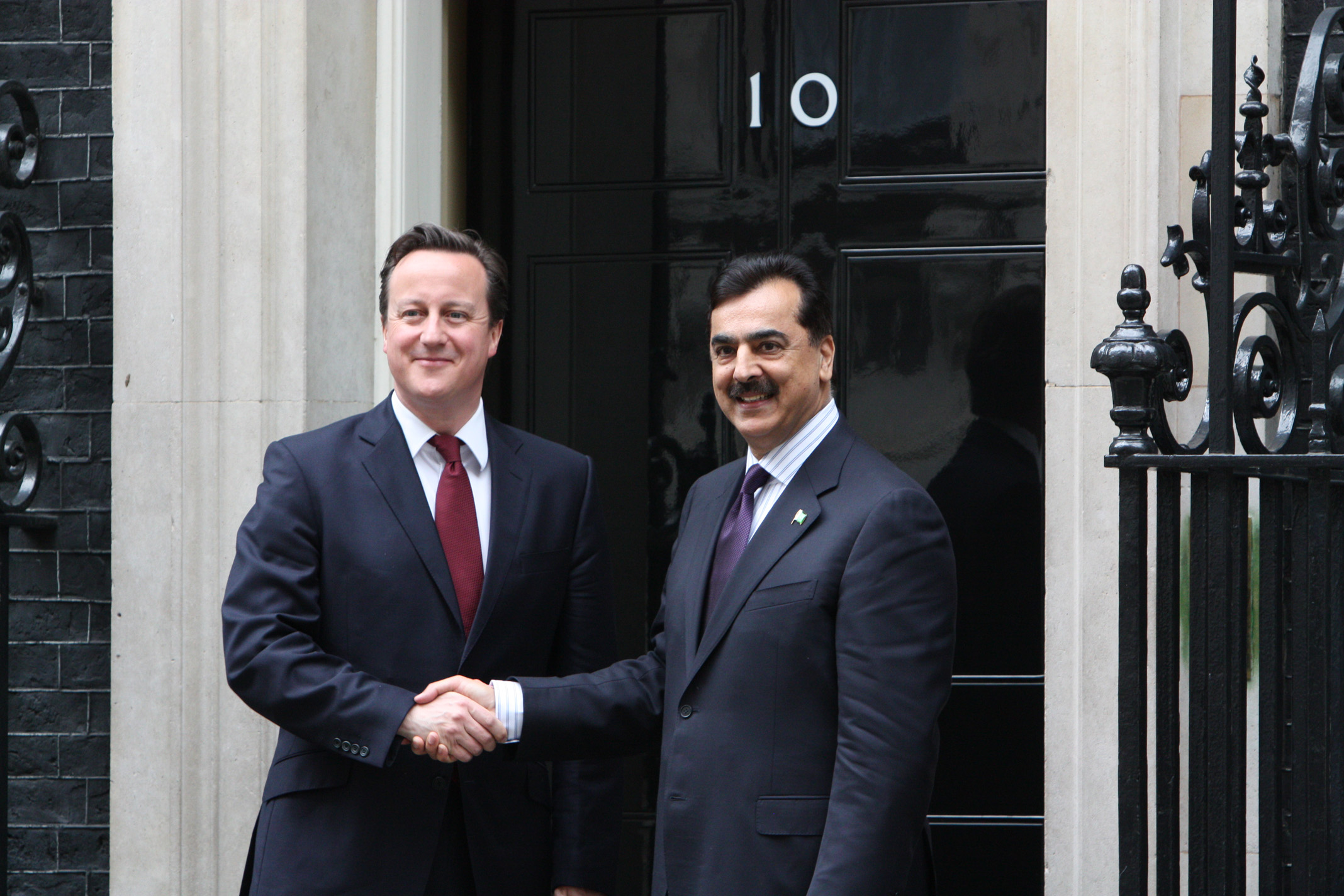
Prime Minister of Pakistan Yousaf Raza Gillani (R) had a phone call in 2012 to discuss resuming British Airways flights to Karachi with Prime Minister of the United Kingdom David Cameron (L)

Pakistan–United Kingdom relations encompass the diplomatic, economic and historical ties between the Islamic Republic of Pakistan, and the United Kingdom of Great Britain and Northern Ireland. Until 1956, Pakistan was nominally part of the British Empire as a post-independence federal Dominion in the aftermath of the partition of British India in 1947. The United Kingdom is home to the Second-largest Pakistani diaspora population.

Both countries share common membership of the Commonwealth, the United Nations, and the World Trade Organization. Bilaterally the two countries have a Development Partnership, a Double Taxation Convention, and an Investment Agreement.

== History ==
The UK governed Pakistan from 1824 to 1947, when Pakistan became independent from the UK under the terms of the Indian Independence Act. During a Conservative Friends of Pakistan event in 2023 Dan Hannan explained how Muhammad Ali Jinnah nearly became a Conservative MP but chose overseas nationalism instead. At this point the Dominion of Pakistan was still nominally part of the British Empire, until it became an independent republic in 1956.

Historically, Britain and Pakistan allied to prevent the incursion of communism. It was a final wish of founder Muhammad Ali Jinnah for the British and Pakistani people to enjoy friendship and good relations.

=== Contemporary era ===
Pakistan left the Commonwealth of Nations in 1972 in protest of the recognition of Bangladeshi independence, before rejoining in 1989.

In 2018, Pakistan and the United Kingdom signed the UK-Pakistan Prisoner Transfer Agreement allowing foreign prisoners in both countries to serve their sentences in home country.

== Diplomatic ties ==
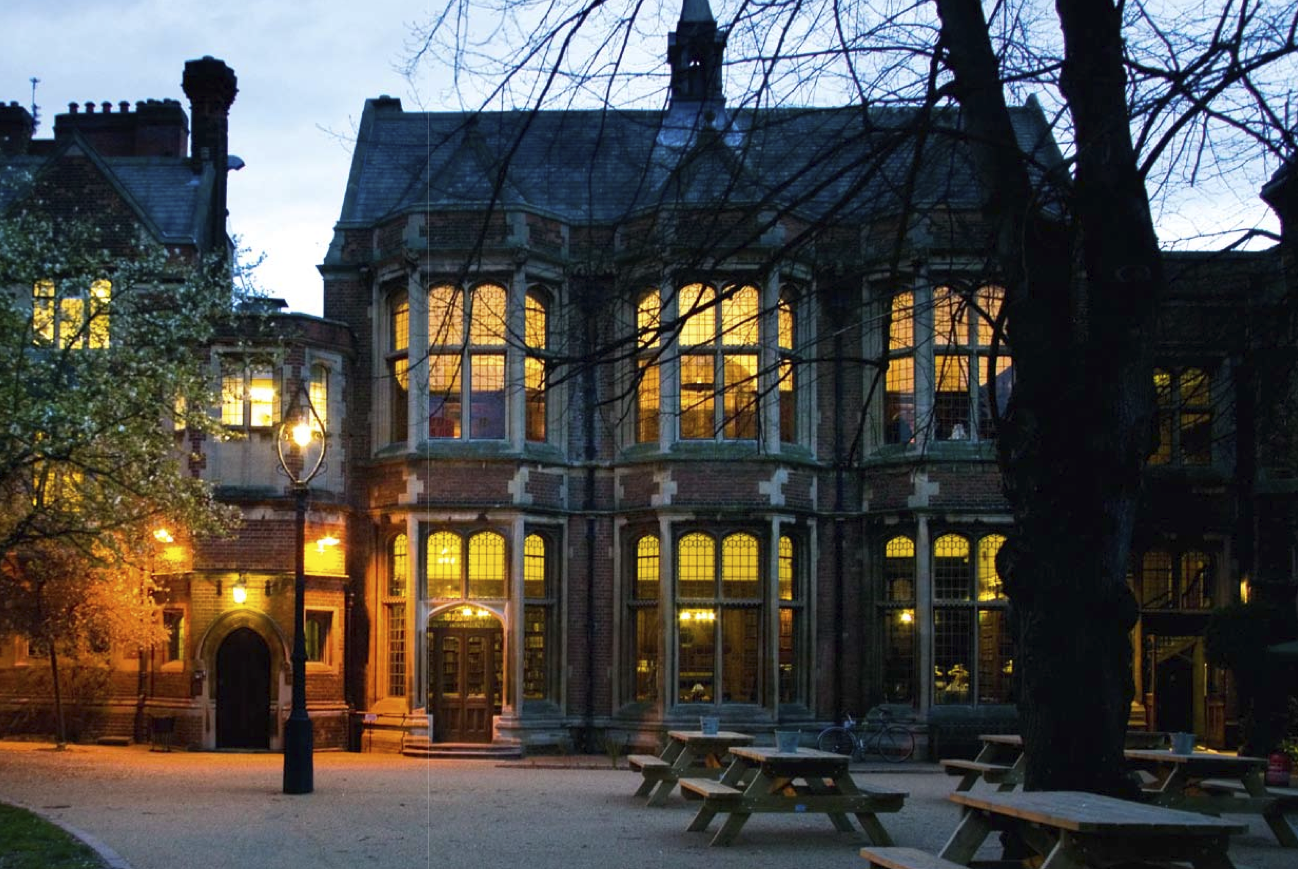
The Oxford University Union has previously had three Student Presidents who were Pakistan-born.

- Pakistan maintains a high commission in London. Pakistan also maintains consulates in Birmingham, Bradford, Manchester, and Glasgow.
- The United Kingdom is accredited to Pakistan through its high commission in Islamabad, as well as a deputy high commission in Karachi.

The United Kingdom and Pakistan have High Commissioners, a position which often fulfills the role of ambassador within the Commonwealth . The current High Commissioner for the UK in Pakistan is Jane Marriott, and Pakistan's High Commissioner to the UK is currently Mohammad Nafees Zakaria..

After years of efforts, the Foreign and Commonwealth Office now consider most of Pakistan safe for travel.

Research by Liam S Barlow has found Policy Exchange receive funding from the Government of Pakistan.

=== Diplomatic Issues ===
In July 2026, the deportation of convicted members of the Rochdale child sexual exploitation gang became a diplomatic issue between the United Kingdom and Pakistan. Shabbir Ahmed, identified as a ringleader of the gang, and Qari Abdul Rauf were among individuals subject to deportation arrangements involving Pakistan; the UK government said it was in discussions with Pakistani authorities to facilitate their removal. Pakistan subsequently refused to accept Ahmed's return, while reports indicated that the issue had become the subject of wider diplomatic negotiations, including reported Pakistani requests concerning UK-based political dissidents.

== Economic relations ==
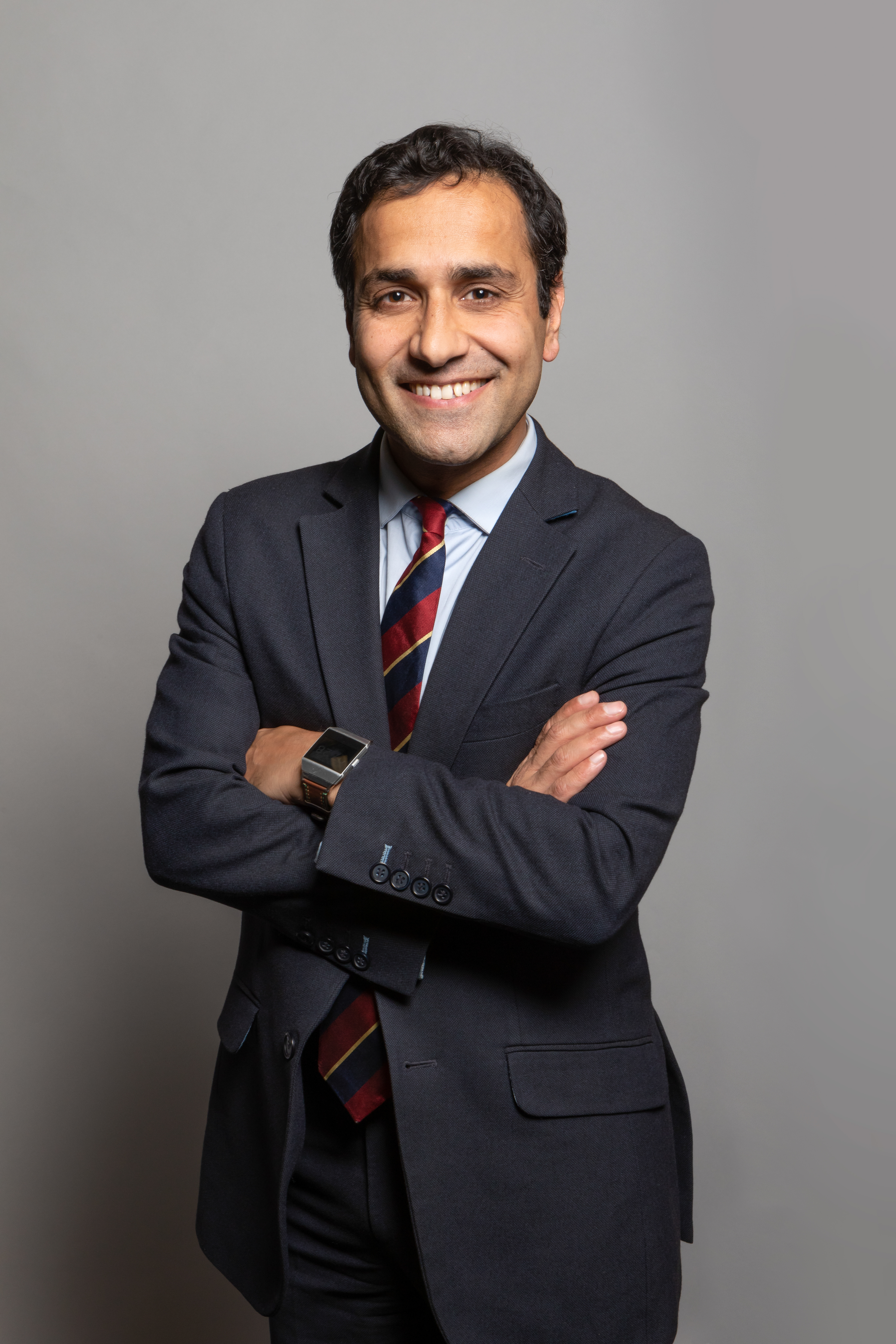
Rehman Chishti was the first Pakistan-born MP and has served in the British Army.

Since 1988, there has been a tax treaty in place between the two countries designed to prevent individuals or businesses being taxed for the same income twice, and to prevent tax avoidance..

In 2012 the Prime Ministers of both countries launched a Trade and Investment Roadmap to increase trade between the countries. Chaudhry Nisar Ali Khan, Pakistani Interior Minister, recently stated bilateral visits between the countries would be arranged to support trade relations.

A Pakistan–Britain Advisory Council was created in 2002 to facilitate trade and commercial connections between the Pakistan and the United Kingdom.

During a 2023 Conservative Friends of Pakistan event the UK Foreign Secretary explained how his first job in youth was working for a Karachi-born shop keeper in London.

Forbes Billionaire Mian Muhammad Mansha made headlines when he purchased the St James Club as one of the most expensive purchases ever.

=== Remittances ===
Pakistan receives the second highest number of workers sending money to family from the UK after India.

== Security agreements and Scientific collaboration ==
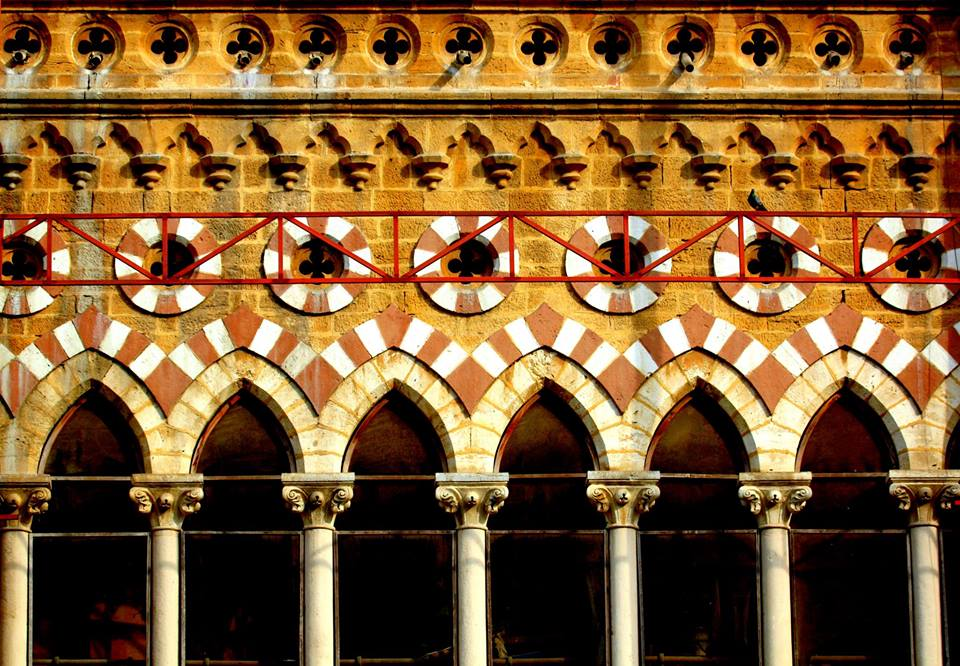
Frere Hall is an example of British Architecture in Pakistan. It was originally built to be Karachi Town Hall.

Both nations were part of a Cold War alliance called the Central Treaty Organization, which the UK saw as important in containing the expansion of Soviet influence in the region, while Pakistan joined partly in the hope of attracting economic benefits from the West. Pakistan's intelligence agency the ISI was formed by British officers in their departure from India. The ISI maintains extensive links with UK intelligence services and operations inside the UK. The British government regards the Baluchistan Liberation Army as a terrorist organization, it was proscribed in July 2006. Regular meetings and discussions on national security and counter-terrorism regularly take place between the governments of the two countries.

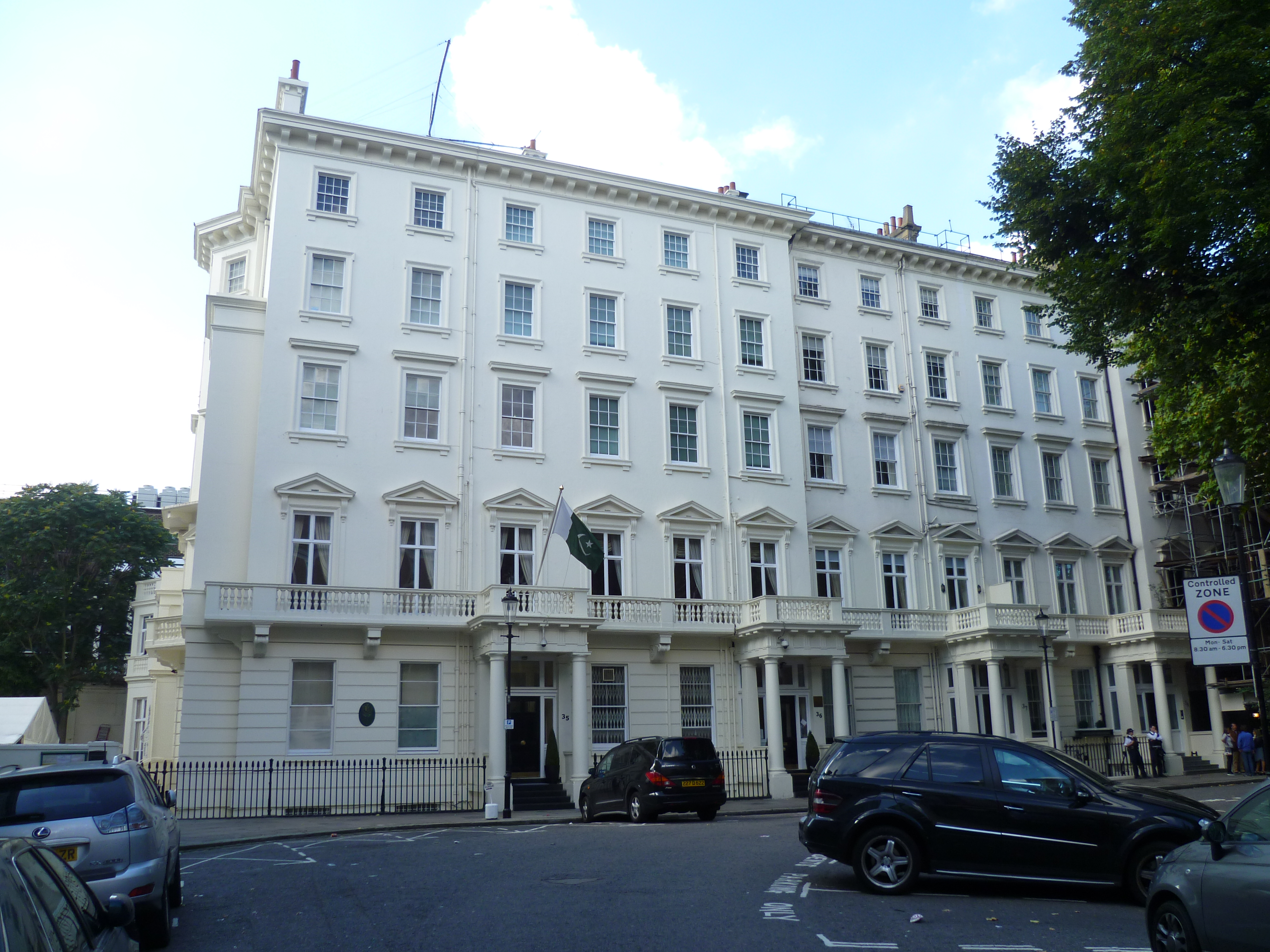
High Commission of Pakistan in London

Faced with US anger over its alleged role in supporting the Taliban, the Pakistani military has increasingly sought British support to counter the prospect of international isolation. Since 2015 the Pakistan Army has also regularly commanded and staffed the Joint Services at Royal Military Academy Sandhurst as well as the Defence Academy of the United Kingdom. London’s backing also enabled a visit by General Qamar Javed Bajwa to Washington in 2022. The British Army sees the Pakistani forces as a necessary bulwark against jihadists in Afghanistan, and it has also pushed India to engage Pakistan on Kashmir, saying it will help marginalize jihadists.. The UK is alleged to have helped in sending Pakistani munitions to the Ukrainian military in a 2022 report that detailed a $364 million deal resulting in British military cargo planes flying munitions from Pakistan to Ukraine via British military bases in Cyprus.

The border areas between Pakistan and Afghanistan, Pakistan-administered Kashmir and Indian-administered Kashmir, and Pakistan and Iran are considered unsafe for travel by the UK Foreign Office.

== See also ==
- British Pakistanis
- High Commission of Pakistan, London
- High Commission of the United Kingdom, Islamabad
- Foreign relations of Pakistan
- Foreign relations of the United Kingdom
- Inter-Services Intelligence activities in the United Kingdom
