= Saud Memon =

Pakistani businessman

- Born: 1961
- Died: 18 May 2007 (aged 45–46); ICU of the Liaquat National hospital
- Occupation: Business

Saud Memon (circa 1961 – 18 May 2007) was a Pakistani businessman from Karachi dealing in yarn and textiles. Memon was said to own the Al-Qaeda safe house in Karachi where American journalist Daniel Pearl was killed. Memon was wanted by law-enforcement agencies in the Pearl case for supposedly providing the place where Pearl was beheaded and subsequently buried. However, Memon was never formally charged.

== Disappearance and involvement ==
During the investigation of the kidnapping and murder of Daniel Pearl's in January 2002, the police were looking for Memon, an industrialist who reportedly owned the shed where Pearl's remains were found, by January 2003. Memon was named by several arrested members of Harakat ul-Mujahedeen Al-Almi as their chief financial backer and was believed to have fled Pakistan. Memon was reported as being still at large.

In April 2005, it was reported that Memon was one of the trustees of Al-Akhtar Trust International, a charity, the United States Treasury asserted, had ties to al Qaeda and the Taliban.

Sources said Memon's particulars in the 'Trust Deed' and the Red Book of the Crime Investigation Department (CID), Sindh, matched 100 percent.

According to their confessional statements in 2005, the detained militants revealed that three men including senior Al-Qaeda member Khalid Sheikh Mohammed (now in custody in the US), Abdul Rahman and Nasrullah – both Kuwaiti nationals fluent in Arabic, Balochi and Persian – arrived at the scene at the behest of Saud Memon, who was believed to be Al-Qaeda's chief financier in Pakistan, and who owned the house, where Pearl was held and took over the operation. The authorities were reportedly still searching for the Kuwaitis. On the day Pearl died, two Pakistani men acting as guards were also present: Ali Khan, arrested several months ago, and Fazal Karim, an employee of Saud Memon.

According to the Associated Press Memon disappeared four years ago in 2003, and was held in "mysterious detention" and released on 28 April 2007, when he was dumped on a garbage heap in front of his home in Karachi in very poor health and near death by unidentified men.

A human rights activist reported Memon to have been badly injured, weighing less than 80 pounds, having lost his memory, unable to speak and unable to recognise his family members.

According to Memon's family, he was abducted in March 2003 from South Africa by FBI agents while on a business trip and later brought to Pakistan and held by intelligence agencies. His brother, Mahmood Memon, said the family learned only this year from another detainee, who had been released that Memon was in Pakistan and that "we don't know who had been holding him for the past over four years, but my brother had nothing to do with Al Qaeda or Daniel Pearl's murder". His sister said he was not connected to Al Qaeda or Pearl's death.

A review of Bernard-Henri Lévy's book Who killed Daniel Pearl?, published in the Asia Times on 28 June 2003 said:

An informant tells BHL "how everything started by the dismantling ... of a cell making fake papers for al-Qaeda clandestines"; and how the investigation led to "a trafficker specialized not only in fake papers but in the export of clandestine workers to Riyadh, 11 or 12-year-old kids selected in Karachi and Dacca to work as jockeys in camel races on the beaches of Dubai and, last but not least, al-Qaeda combatants exported, through the Oman Straits, to the Emirates, Yemen and other Middle East countries". This man, the real target of the anti-terrorist operation of September 11, 2002, was not Ramzi bin al-Shibh (who was arrested) or alleged September mastermind Khalid Shaikh (who was not there), but Saud Memon, the owner of the lot, where Pearl was kept captive, tortured, executed and buried.

Mr. Mansfield of the CIA declined to comment on Memon's case, saying, "The C.I.A. does not, as a rule, comment on allegations regarding who has, or has not, been in its custody."

Five days after he was freed, Memon appeared in a wheelchair before the Supreme Court in Islamabad. Reporters in court said he appeared to be in very poor physical condition.

Pakistani police officials said they wanted to question Memon, but no charges had been laid against him.

Human rights groups have said they suspect that Memon and several others were held in secret extrajudicial detention by Pakistani intelligence agents probing Pearl's slaying. In December 2014, when the United States Senate Intelligence Committee published its Senate Intelligence Committee report on CIA torture, it confirmed suspicions that Memon was held in the CIA's network of black sites, prior to transfer to Pakistan's secret torture prisons.

Amina Masood Janjua, Memon's lawyer and a human rights activist for missing Pakistanis, said, Memon was in the custody of Pakistani intelligence officials. A senior police official named Manzoor Mughal, investigating Pearl's murder, denied knowing that Memon had ever been in Pakistani custody.

According to Asra Q. Nomani, a longtime colleague of Daniel Pearl's, Pakistani papers reported that Saud Memon had been held in the United States Guantanamo Bay detention camps, in Cuba. However, Saud Memon's name was not on the final official lists of Guantanamo captives, released on 15 May 2006.

== Death ==
Memon died 2.30 PM on Friday, 18 May 2007 in the ICU of the private Liaquat National hospital – close to 3 weeks after his release. His death was attributed to complications related to meningitis and tuberculosis according to Dr Ali Azmat Abidi of the hospital. Memon leaves behind his wife, four sons and a daughter, who declined to talk to the press.

== Torture controversy ==
An article from the 12 November 2007 issue of the Wall Street Journal quoted an unnamed senior US counter-terrorism official, who said Memon was:

...in a lot of the rooms where important things were being discussed. He knew senior Al-Qaeda people, and was moving equipment and supplies.

The Wall Street Journal also quoted an unnamed Pakistani official who said that Saud Memon was held in the American Bagram Theater detention facility, and that he was already in poor condition, when the Americans repatriated him to Pakistani custody.

Human rights organisation, Amnesty International, also expressed concerns about the fate and whereabouts of hundreds of people remained unclear and they were feared to be at risk of torture and other ill-treatment referring to Memon and his whereabouts during 2003–2007 and his death. They were said Memon contracted tuberculosis while in alleged US custody.

International Federation for Human Rights (FIDH) also noted Memon as one of the missing persons to resurface, as victims of abuse "revealing the existence of centers and places of illegal detention, inhuman and degrading treatment suffered, and confessions extracted under torture."

== See also ==
- Bagram torture and prisoner abuse
- List of solved missing person cases (2000s)
- Missing persons (Pakistan)
