= Inter-Services Intelligence activities in the United Kingdom =

- Part of Pakistan–United Kingdom relations
- Location: United Kingdom
- Objective: Operational

This article lists activities or field operations reportedly undertaken by the Pakistani Inter-Services Intelligence (ISI) in the United Kingdom.

== Background ==
ISI's operations in the UK have been described as "among the most comprehensive outside Pakistan", drawing heavily upon the support of the 1.2-million-strong British Pakistani community. ISI's interests in Britain may be projected through intelligence officials posted at the High Commission of Pakistan in London and at consulates elsewhere. British intelligence agencies such as MI6 maintain counter-terrorism cooperation with the ISI.

== 2006 ==
When the Pakistani cricket team toured England in 2006, the English Cricket Board (ECB) invited former Prime Minister Nawaz Sharif, living in exile in London at that time, to the VIP enclosure at a match in Lords as cricket diplomacy. Sharif was a political opponent of the Musharraf-led government back in Pakistan. Shahryar Khan, the Pakistan Cricket Board chairman at that time, received a telephone call from an ISI official posted at the Pakistani High Commission enquiring "how Nawaz Sharif had received the invitation which he could exploit in his favour with the Pakistan media." The official pressed Khan to request the ECB to cancel the invitation, thinking the latter had been involved. In his book, Khan remarks that "I brusquely informed the ISI Brigadier that I had no hand in the invitation and had no contact with Nawaz Sharif, my former boss... and that his invitation to the box had been made independently by the ECB."

== 2011 ==
According to a report by The Telegraph, Pakistani ISI had been operating Kashmir-centric lobbying groups, The Justice Foundation and World Kashmir Freedom Movement in London. The objectives of these organisations were similar to that of the Kashmiri American Council, another non-governmental lobbying group based in Washington and led by Syed Ghulam Nabi Fai, which also received ISI support. These groups sought to influence the government's positions on the Kashmir conflict in their respective host countries. Based in central London and founded by Kashmiri activist Ayub Thakur, The Justice Foundation, however, describes itself as a non-aligned organisation. It had arranged conferences and events in the House of Commons and House of Lords focusing on human rights issues in Jammu and Kashmir and conflict resolution on Kashmir. The group has hosted several Labour, Conservative and Liberal-Democrat MPs, as well as politicians from Pakistan, and received messages of support from then Prime Minister Tony Blair and Mayor of London Ken Livingstone amongst others. Conferences such as these draw strongly upon the support of the British Kashmiri community.

== 2014 ==
Indian intelligence alleged that the ISI supported Sikh Khalistan movement activists based in the UK, convening a training course for them in 2014 in Mae Sot, Thailand. However, in a 2019 report published by British government-funded Commission for Countering Extremism (CCE) concluded there was no evidence of Pakistan supporting the Khalistan movement in the United Kingdom.

== 2021 ==
According to a report by The Guardian, MI5 and Metropolitan Police had uncovered a plan by ISI to assassinate Pakistan-origin Baloch and Pashtun activists living in UK. The report also stated that the conspiracy to murder of Ahmad Waqass Goraya, a Pakistani Human Rights activist living in exile in Netherlands, in June 2021, was also planned by ISI.
