= The Queen's Reading Room =

United Kingdom-based charity

- Formation: 2021 (as Instagram initiative); 2023 (as charity)
- Founder: Queen Camilla
- Type: Charity
- Purpose: Promote reading and literacy
- Location(s): 1 Bartholomew Close; London EC1A 7BL
- Chair: Amanda Felicity MacKenzie
- Trustees: Aatif Naveed Hassan; Amanda MacManus; Gyles Brandreth
- Website: thequeensreadingroom.co.uk
- Formerly called: The Duchess of Cornwall's Reading Room

The Queen's Reading Room (formerly The Duchess of Cornwall's Reading Room) is a United Kingdom-based charity launched in 2023 by Queen Camilla.

== History ==
The project dates back to January 2021, when Camilla (then Duchess of Cornwall) started an Instagram book‑club during the COVID‑19 lockdown. Initially, the Instagram account featured a small number of book recommendations and it later developed into a community with over 155,000 followers. In February 2023, the initiative was formally launched as a registered charity under the name The Queen's Reading Room. At the charitable launch reception in March 2023, Camilla stated that the Reading Room would "close the gap between readers and writers" by offering free, accessible literary content year-round via social media and online platforms.

At that same reception, she also announced their plan to hold a first literary festival. The inaugural Queen's Reading Room Festival took place on 11 June 2023 at Hampton Court Palace, in partnership with Historic Royal Palaces. The festival lineup included high‑profile figures such as Judi Dench, Ken Follett, David Olusoga, Kamila Shamsie, and Gyles Brandreth. For the first festival, 2,500 free tickets were allocated to NHS staff, charity workers, and members of the Armed Forces. The festival is meant to be annual; by September 2025 the charity was holding its third edition, this time at Chatsworth House. In the 2025 Chatsworth edition, the Queen participated in a discussion on reading and mental health, viewed a performance of a Jane Austen adaptation (commemorating Austen's 250th birth anniversary), and donated books to service users of the Elm Foundation.

The charity also commissioned a neuroscientific‑mixed methods study to investigate the effects of reading fiction on wellbeing, brain health, mental health, concentration, and social connection. The study included quantitative, qualitative, and neuroscientific components: brain scans, skin conductance, galvanic skin response tests, and a survey. Among its main findings were that reading fiction for just 5 minutes was found to reduce stress by nearly 20%, the same short reading period improved concentration by about 11%, and reading earlier in the day helped people feel more connected to others and more ready to face daily challenges. The study was first publicly presented at a reception at Clarence House on 26 March 2024. In 2025, it was reported that The Queen's Reading Room had entered into a partnership with the British Neuroscience Association (BNA) to highlight and deepen research on how reading affects brain health. By 2025, the charity has also donated over 2,300 books to 11 grassroots locations, including 1,400 to inpatients at Chelsea and Westminster Hospital, and supports reading groups in St Mungo's homeless shelters and domestic violence refuges.

The charity announced a podcast series which launched on 7 January 2024. In that podcast, authors, actors, and literary figures were invited to share their favourite books or reflections on reading. Guests included Sir Ian Rankin and later appearances were made by Dame Joanna Lumley, Ann Patchett, David Baddiel, among others. The podcast was positioned as a complement to the Reading Room's online book club and festival presence. By the end of 2024, three seasons of the podcast had been released.

On 26 March 2025, a reception at Clarence House was held to mark the launch of The Queen's Reading Room Medal, intended to honour individuals who champion reading, books, and storytelling in their local communities. Camilla described it as part of the Reading Room's mission: "Making life better is the ultimate aim of my Reading Room". Nominations for the medal were open from April through December 2025. The judging panel included figures across the publishing and literacy world. The first awards were given in March 2026.

Starting in 2025, the organisation began partnering with the homelessness charity St Mungo's, offering a shared programme to encourage reading for individuals recovering from homelessness. In January 2026, the Bentley Foundation announced that the Queen's Reading Room had become their first strategic partner – coinciding with the UK's National Year of Reading. In the same month, the Queen's Reading Room and the University of East London announced plans to work a neuroscientific study supported by the Bentley Foundation to investigate the effects of shared reading in book clubs on focus and establishing deeper social connection, the results of which were published in November 2026.
