= Enforced disappearances in Pakistan =

Human rights violations in military dictatorship

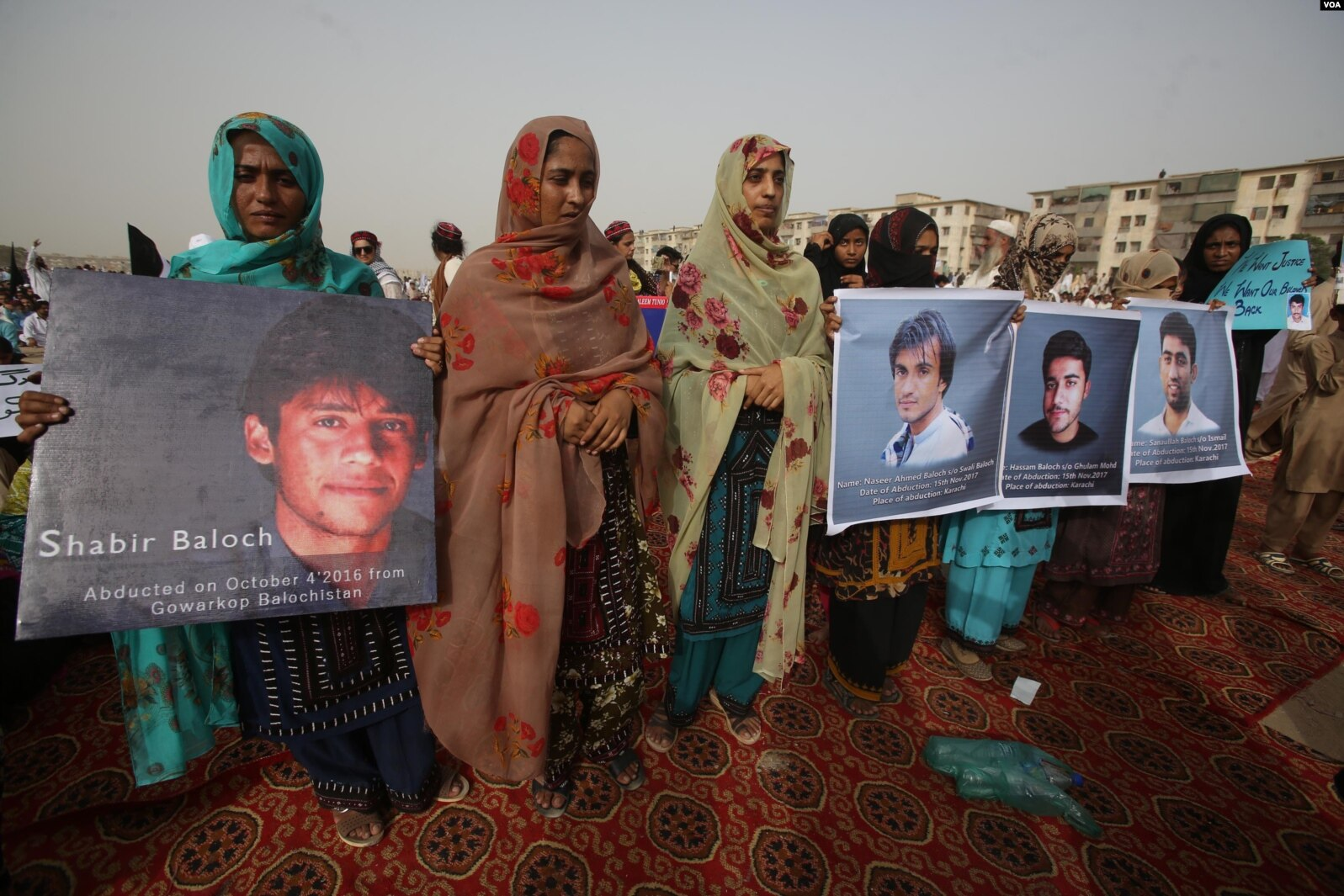
Protest about missing persons, Karachi

Forced disappearance in Pakistan originated during the military rule of General Pervez Musharraf (1999 to 2008). The practice continued during subsequent governments. The term missing persons is sometimes used as a euphemism. According to Amina Masood Janjua, a human rights activist and chairperson of Defence of Human Rights Pakistan, there are more than 5,000 reported cases of forced disappearance in Pakistan. Human rights activists allege that the law enforcement agencies in Pakistan are responsible for the cases of forced disappearance in Pakistan. However, the law enforcement agencies in Pakistan deny this and insist that many of the missing persons have either joined militant organisations such as the TTP in Afghanistan and other conflict zones or they have fled to be an illegal immigrant in Europe and died en route.

Since 2011, the government of Pakistan established a Commission to investigate cases of enforced disappearance in Pakistan. The Commission reports that it has received 7,000 cases of enforced disappearance since its inception, and it has resolved around 5,000 of those cases. Enforced disappearances have long been a stain on Pakistan’s human rights record.

== Background ==
The practice of enforced disappearance is a global problem that afflicts people in various countries and with different ethnicity, religions and political backgrounds. Although enforced disappearance is a crime under international law, the U.N. has recorded thousands of disappearances in over 100 countries in recent decade. Some of the countries which are crucially charged with the allegations of enforced disappearances include Iraq, Iran, Sri Lanka, Chile, Ethiopia, Syria, African countries, Bangladesh, India, China, Russia, US and Pakistan.

== From 1999 to 2008 ==
After the US invasion of Afghanistan in 2001, forced disappearance in Pakistan allegedly began during the rule of military dictator General Pervez Musharraf (1999 to 2008). Pakistan went under immense terrorist activities. A large number of people became the victim of suicidal attacks. During "war on terror", many people were suspected as terrorists and then taken away by government agencies. Many of them were then handed over to the United States authorities to be imprisoned in the Guantanamo Bay's Camp X-Ray. After Musharaf resigned in August 2008, he was charged with various human rights violations.

== From 2009 to present ==
According to Amina Masood Janjua, a human rights activist and chairperson of Defence of Human Rights Pakistan, there are more than 5,000 reported cases of forced disappearance in Pakistan.Defence of Human Rights Pakistan is a not for profit organization working against forced disappearance in Pakistan. The families of missing persons have also staged protest across Pakistan demanding to know the whereabouts their missing family members. According to a report by the European Union, there has been a high and growing number of enforced disappearance cases in Pakistan, particularly in Balochistan and Khyber Pakhtunkhwa, alongside reports of extrajudicial killings.

The report stated that the Commission of Inquiry on Enforced Disappearances had closed more than 9,000 cases without finding evidence of state involvement in any of them. It added that when a case is closed on the grounds that the person has "returned home" or is deceased, the Commission does not record what happened to the individual during the period they were missing. The Baloch Women's Forum alleged that security forces raided a home in Kalli Kongarh, in Mastung district, Balochistan, on 21 July 2026, and forcibly took away a woman identified as Bibi Rafia, daughter of Imam Bakhsh, along with her three young children, her brother Muhammad Arif, and her 18-year-old niece Bibi Nida. In a statement issued by its spokesperson, the forum said the family had since received no information about their whereabouts.

=== Balochistan ===
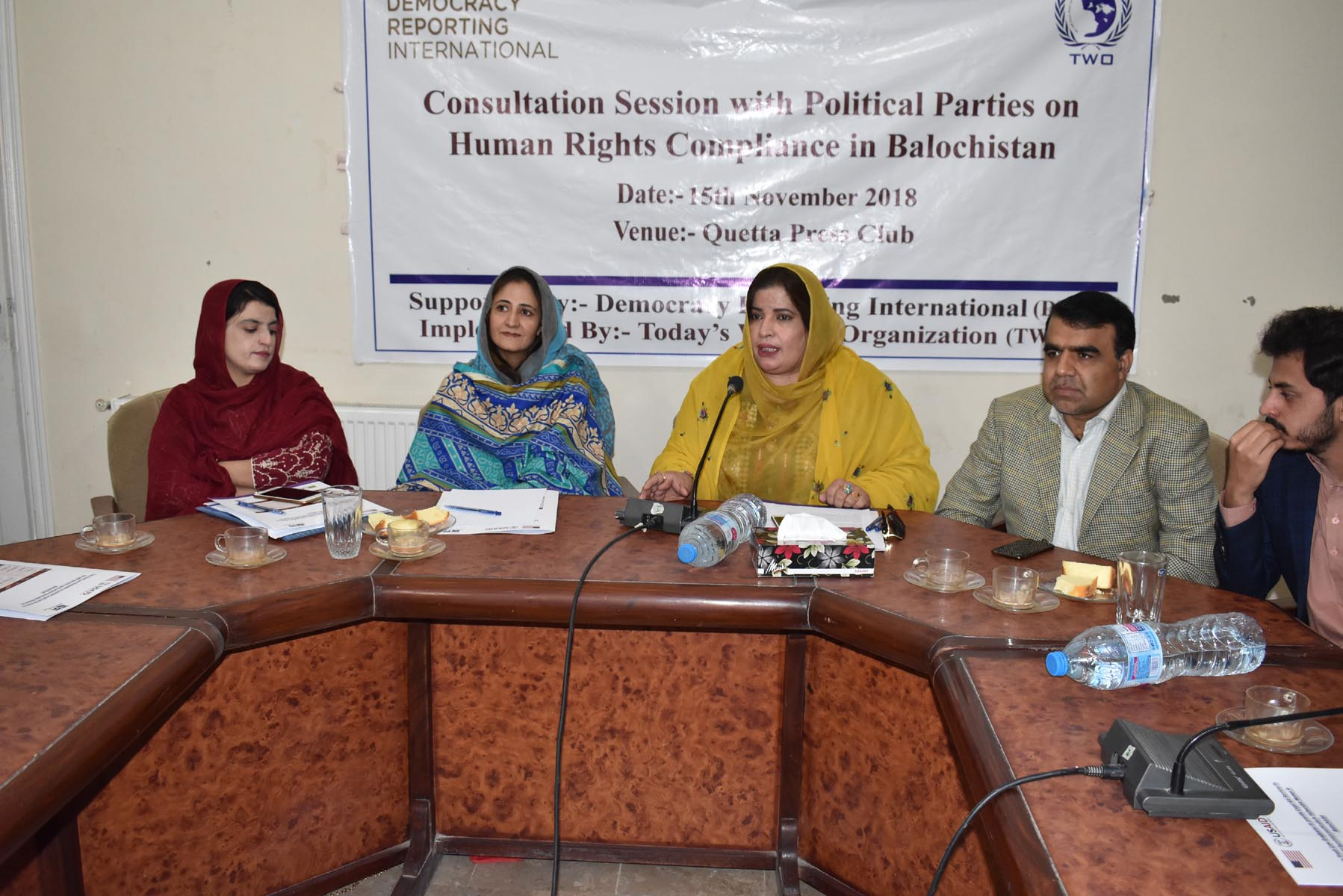
Consultation Session with Political parties on Human Rights Compliance in Balochistan, Quetta Press Club

Most of the cases of forced disappearances in recent years were reported in Pakistan's Balochistan province which has been witnessing a low-level insurgency for more than a decade and a half. According to Voice for Baloch Missing Persons (VBMP) around 528 Baloch people have gone missing from 2001 to 2017.

In October 2024 alone, 99 enforced disappearances were reported and only about 29 individuals were reportedly released after detention. The average number of disappearances for October was over three per day.

A senior Pakistani provincial security official says that missing person figures are 'exaggerated', that 'in Balochistan, insurgents, immigrants who fled to Europe and even those who have been killed in military operations are declared as missing persons'. Reports have shown that many people have fled the province to seek asylum in other countries because of the unrest caused by separatist militants.

Similarly separatist militants have also been found responsible for forced disappearances cases. Separatist militants usually wear military uniform while carrying out their militant activities. Hence they often get mistaken as security officials.

== People who have at any point gone missing ==
- Masood Ahmed Janjua (Husband of Amina Masood Janjua)
- Safdar Sarki
- Saud Memon
- Aafia Siddiqui and her three children
- Hafiz Abdul Basit
- Muzafar Bhutto
- Hasani, a barber, along with Mohammad Hafeez and Murtaza, were forcibly disappeared and later found dead on a Monday morning of late April 2011. Their bullet-riddled bodies showed signs of severe torture, with each shot in the head and chest. The Baloch Republican Party blamed government forces for the killings.
- Zareef, kidnapped on April 17, 2011, from a passenger coach near Nialat, and Mohammad Shameem, who went missing six days prior, were found dead in a deserted area in Kech district on April 26, 2011.
- Abdul Wahid Baloch, a telephone operator at the Civil Hospital Karachi and a Baloch activist, disappeared on July 26, 2016, after being detained by unknown men near Karachi. Despite his family's efforts, including legal actions, his whereabouts remain unknown, with suspicions of involvement by intelligence agencies due to his political affiliations.
- Zeenat Shahzadi, a 24-year-old female journalist who was investigating a disappearance case, was allegedly abducted by some armed personnel on 19 August 2015 and went missing. Her disappearance caused her younger brother to commit suicide. She was later recovered from near the Pakistan-Afghanistan border in October 2017.
- In early January 2017, five social media activists – Salman Haider, Ahmad Waqass Goraya, Aasim Saeed, and Ahmad Raza Naseer – went missing from different parts of Pakistan. Salman Haider was also a poet and academic. However, after few days, all of the bloggers returned to their homes. Their families confirmed their return and reported that all of the bloggers were unharmed.
- Dr. Deen Muhammad Baloch
- Zakir Majeed of the Baloch Students Federation was abducted on 8 June 2009.
- Faseeh Baloch and Sohail Baloch, students at the University of Balochistan in Quetta, went missing on 1 November 2021. The incident also triggered a month-long protest by the Baloch Student Organization (BSO).
- Faqeer Jan, Asa Baloch, Abid Hussain, and Masti Khan. Faqeer Jan and Asa Baloch were killed in a staged encounter in November 2024. Abid Hussain and Masti Khan’s mutilated bodies were found in December 2024, after being missing since 2017 according to Human Rights Council of Balochistan.
- Anas Ahmed, a 15-year-old from Khuzdar, Balochistan, was allegedly taken by military personnel in January 2025 from the Guzgi area, prompting protests and a sit-in by his family and locals demanding his release and information.
- Shoaib Ali, Haneef, Ishfaq, Shahzad, Bebarg Ameer, Zubair, Qambar Ali, and Saeedullah, all from Balochistan, disappeared on October 16, 2024, from their shared residence in Gulistan-i-Jauhar, with their families alleging they were taken by law enforcement agencies.
- Hayat Sabzal Baloch, abducted by Pakistani soldiers on July 3, 2024, was found dead in Panjgur on February 12, 2025. His family had protested his disappearance, and although authorities promised his safe return, his body was discovered months later under tragic circumstances.

Some have reported to have been handed over to the CIA and/or flown to Bagram, Afghanistan and later shipped off to Guantanamo Bay. Reports of forced abductions by the Pakistani state first began arising in 2001, in the aftermath of the United States invasion of Afghanistan and the commencement of the US-led war on terror. Many of the missing persons are activists associated with the Baloch nationalist and Sindhi nationalist movements.

Between August 2010 and April 2011, 140 people were forcibly disappeared and later found dead with bullet wounds. Family members blamed security personnel for the killings and dumping of the bodies, according to VBMP chairperson Nasurllah Baloch.

In a news report by The Express Tribune, Mama Qadeer Baloch claimed that 21,000 Baloch are missing in Balochistan, and they have received the dead bodies of people.

In November 2023, the Islamabad High Court addressed the case of 69 Baloch students who had been subjected to ethnic profiling, harassment, and enforced disappearances by state institutions. Despite some students having returned home, 50 remained missing. The court criticized the lack of action from the government and summoned key officials, including the Prime Minister, to explain the failure to resolve the issue.

Jan Achakzai claimed in 2024 that 2,200 missing people had been found in the province. During a media conference, the minister announced that 2,200 of the 2,700 people who had been reported missing in Balochistan had been reunited with their families. However, Achakzai did state that 468 people were still missing in Balochistan.Additionally, he claimed startling amounts of missing individuals in other countries, including 350,000 in India, 500,000 in the United States, and one lakh in the United Kingdom.

In late October 2026, Prince Muhammad Khan Ahmedzai, son of Khan of Kalat Mir Suleman Dawood Jan Ahmedzai, along with his three guards was intercepted and kidnapped by unidentified suspects while traveling between Soorab and Kalat at night.

== Criticism ==
The cases of forced disappearances were criticized by human rights organizations and the media. They have urged the government of Pakistan to probe these incidents. In 2011, a Commission of Inquiry on Enforced Disappearances was formed, but there was little progress in the investigation.

In January 2021, the Islamabad High Court, after hearing a petition on a disappearance case from 2015, ruled that the prime minister of Pakistan and his cabinet were responsible for the state’s failure to protect its citizens “because the buck stops at the top.” The court also termed enforced disappearances as “the most heinous crime and intolerable.”

Pakistan has grappled with a persistent issue of enforced disappearances, which has marred its human rights reputation for a considerable period of time. Despite assurances from successive administrations to outlaw this practice, progress in enacting relevant legislation has been sluggish, leaving individuals vulnerable to forced disappearances without any accountability for the perpetrators. Since the outset of its occupation, the Pakistani state has resorted to enforced disappearances as a means to suppress the oppressed population of Balochistan, marking a prolonged history of such occurrences. This systematic practice has been employed to silence the voices within the region.

In January 2026, authorities arrested Imaan Mazari-Hazir, a Pakistani human rights lawyer, and her husband, Hadi Ali Chattha, for social media posts concerning enforced disappearances in Khyber Pakhtunkhwa and Balochistan and criticism of security operations against the Balochistan Liberation Army and Tehreek-i-Taliban Pakistan. The couple were sentenced to 17 years imprisonment.

== Government response ==
In 2011, a Commission of Inquiry on Enforced Disappearances was formed by the government of Pakistan to investigate the cases of forced disappearances in the country. According to Amnesty International, the commission has so far received 3,000 cases of such disappearances. By 2021, the Commission reports that it has received 7,000 cases of forced disappearance since its inception and it has resolved around 5,000 of those cases.

In June 2021, the Pakistan's interior minister introduced a bill in National Assembly of Pakistan which criminalized enforced disappearance in the country with 10-year imprisonment for anyone found guilty of it. The bill was later passed by National Assembly of Pakistan in November 2021.

== See also ==
- Forced disappearance
- Enforced disappearance of Mushtaq Mahar
- Gun politics in Pakistan
- Human rights in Pakistan
- Target killings in Pakistan
