= Male heir =

Patriarchy transfer system

A male heir (sometimes heirs male)—usually describing the first-born son (primogeniture) or oldest surviving son of a family—has traditionally been the recipient of the residue of the estate, titles, wealth and responsibilities of his father in a patrilineal system. This system may vary by region but has ancient, perhaps prehistoric, origins, and appears in the Code of Hammurabi: "Since daughters marry strangers and thereby cut themselves off from their family, only sons inherit the paternal estate. It is they who perpetuate the family name, and preserve the ancestral property."

Absence or inadequacy of a male heir has thus been periodically problematic, resulting in succession crises, corporate upheaval, and the occasional war. The presence or absence of a male heir may alter the decision-making patterns of fathers.

== See also ==
- Heir and spare
- Son preference
- Birth order
- Order of succession
- Line of hereditary succession
- Heir apparent
- Estate planning
- Historical inheritance systems
- Partible inheritance
- Patrilineality
- Patronymic
- Human Y-chromosome DNA haplogroup
- Salic law
