= Hafiz Abdul Basit =

Pakistani detainee

- Born: Pakistan
- Known for: Three-year detention on suspicion of involvement in a plot to assassinate Pervez Musharraf

Hafiz Abdul Basit (/ˈɑːbduːl ˈbɑːsɪt/ AHB-dool BAH-sit) is a citizen of Pakistan who is believed to have been detained on suspicion of involvement to assassinate Pakistan's leader President Pervez Musharraf.

== Disappearance ==
A devout Muslim, Basit disappeared from his home on January 4, 2004, and was believed to have been taken into covert extrajudicial detention in a secret Pakistani interrogation center for the next three and a half years. (see also: Missing persons (Pakistan))

Tariq Pervez, the director-general of Pakistan's Federal Investigation Agency, was threatened with jail, unless he produced Basit. Pakistani Chief Justice Iftikhar Mohammad told him:

"It has been proved that you lifted the person and now you are responsible for the production of the detainee before this bench. Either produce the detainee or get ready to go to the dungeon."

Pervez claims he was soon transferred to the custody of Pakistan's intelligence agency, the Interservices Intelligence Directorate.

Pervez was allowed two brief, temporary, releases from the Court, to give him an opportunity to arrange for Hafiz Abdul Basit to be released from his extrajudicial detention—without success. Pakistan's Attorney General Malik Qayyum intervened, and sought a further two-day adjournment, taking responsibility for the release of Hafiz Abdul Basit. Hafiz Abdul Basit had still not been produced, before the Court, on August 22, 2007, when the two-day adjournment expired. The Pakistani newspaper Dawn reported that Qayyum told the Supreme Court:

"...that his exact location was still not known but he had found through a facsimile that a man named Abu Musa Khalid alias Basit was with some political agent in Khyber Agency. He said the person could be produced in the court on Wednesday, or could even be released later in the day (Tuesday)."

The Supreme Court ordered the 25-year-old Basit be released to his maternal uncle Hafiz Mohammad Nasir.

== Aftermath ==
He was finally released August 22, 2007.

Iftikhar's examination of the circumstances of Hafiz Abdul Basit's detention would trigger a wider inquiry into the practice of Pakistan's Intelligence and Justice organs holding captives in extrajudicial detention. Iftikhar wrote

“At present we are concerned with instant relief to the complainant and at a later stage a larger bench will deliberate on the role of agencies and pass a detailed judgment with regard to arbitrary and illegal arrests of persons.”

The Pakistani Supreme Court is going through a list of 287 disappeared men, one at a time.

The Supreme Court also ordered the release of other men from the list of disappeared, Imran Munir, Alim Nasir, Jan Muhammad, Munir Mengal and Salim Baloch.

== See also ==
- List of solved missing person cases (2000s)
