= Heir and spare =

Royalty problems

Heir and spare, or the heir and the spare, is a term referring to first-born and second-born children, usually male, in patrilineal inheritance systems. The first-born is heir apparent or heir presumptive. The second-born is redundancy should there ever be a catastrophic incident involving the first-born. The brutal clarity of this winner-takes-all system contrasts with other, more ambiguous systems where heirs are never told what, how much, or if they will inherit at all.

Historically, it was the duty of women to deliver these heirs for the sake of the perpetuation of the extant economic and social system. For example, before Geneviève d'Arconville began her scientific work in the 1750s, she married and, while still a teenager, "had produced for him an heir, a spare, and even a third son for good measure."

In modern times, the phrase was the inspiration for the title of Prince Harry, Duke of Sussex's 2023 memoir Spare, as he is the younger brother of William, Prince of Wales, the current heir apparent to the British throne.

Conceiving children to provide bone marrow or organs for their sickly older siblings, a concept known as "savior siblings", has been derisively described by a derivative phrase: "the heir and the spare parts."

== See also ==
- Male heir
- Birth order
- Cadet (genealogy)
