= Nowzad Dogs =

British animal welfare charity

- Company type: Charity
- Founded: 21 February 2007; 19 years ago
- Headquarters: United Kingdom
- Key people: Pen Farthing
- Revenue: £741.2K (2018)
- Operating income: £741.2K (2018)
- Website: www.nowzad.com

Nowzad Dogs is a British-based animal welfare charity. It was founded by Pen Farthing, a former Royal Marines commando, after rescuing a dog he called Nowzad whilst serving in the town of Nawzad in Afghanistan.

== Origins ==
During his deployment to Afghanistan in 2006 as part of the Royal Marines in 42 Commando, Farthing and his troops broke up a fight between two dogs in the town of Nawzad. Following this, one of the dogs followed Farthing and they ended up spending the following six months together, with the dog named Nowzad after the town. After the end of his deployment, Farthing brought the dog home to the UK. This inspired him to create the nonprofit company Nowzad Dogs.

== Charity's work ==
Nowzad is a registered charity in England and Wales. Nowzad Dogs NFP is a 501(c)(3) tax exempt organisation in the US.

The charity reunites servicemen with the dogs and cats who befriended them on service following the soldier's return home. It also aids animal welfare in Afghanistan, and built the first animal rescue centre in the country. In addition to reuniting ex-servicemen with dogs and cats they knew from Afghanistan, Farthing through Nowzad has rescued animals to be adopted by members of the public once they are brought to the UK. Among these was a dog named Wylie, who was adopted by Sarah Singleton. The dog competed at Scruffts 2014, the non-pedigree competition run by The Kennel Club in the UK, where it was named dog of the year. Farthing later wrote a book about Wylie, entitled Wylie: The Brave Street Dog Who Never Gave Up, which was published in 2014.

The charity's founder Pen Farthing was nominated for the Lifetime Achievement award at the Daily Mirror and RSPCA Animal Hero Awards in 2013, for his work with the Nowzad charity. He was named one of ten "Heroes of 2014" by CNN.

== Evacuation ==
After the fall of Kabul to the Taliban, Farthing's supporters raised money for privately chartering a flight to evacuate his staff as well as the animals sheltered by his charity.

Visas for 68 people, including the staff of the charity and their immediate family members, were granted on 23 August and safe passage from Kabul was available to them at this point had they wished it but they chose not to leave the animals to die. The animals (173 dogs and cats) were allowed to be evacuated on 25 August as well. They were however forced to leave without entering the airport on 26 August, since the United States government had modified the rules for getting inside the compound shortly before they arrived there. Farthing later stated that five cats had died during the journey, and he believed one dog was stabbed by the Taliban.

Farthing reached the airport along with the charity's animals on 27 August, but he was forced to leave his staff behind. The Taliban detained his convoy for half an hour, after which his drivers were allowed to drive to the side of the airport controlled by the British military. As they came across the zone dividing the Taliban-controlled part and British-controlled part, the drivers had to disembark, with a Parachute Regiment member being ordered to drive the convoy for the rest of the way. Farthing left Afghanistan along with the animals on 28 August. They landed at the Heathrow Airport in London on 29 August. The animals were later sent to quarantine kennels.

67 employees working for the charity were able to leave Afghanistan and cross into Pakistan on 11 September, after the British government convinced the government of Pakistan to grant them clearance. Their family members were also able to escape with them. The group was placed under the care of the British High Commission in Islamabad, and later flown to the United Kingdom to resettle there. A branch of Nowzad remained in Kabul, operating as a donkey rescue centre and staffed by workers who did not want to leave Afghanistan.

In December 2021, a Foreign Office whistleblower alleged that Prime Minister Boris Johnson had given an instruction to "use considerable capacity to transport Nowzad's animals", and that visas were granted to Nowzad staff to enable evacuation to Pakistan despite not meeting the eligibility criteria at the time. Johnson denied the allegation, calling it "complete nonsense". Two emails exchanged sent by Foreign Office officials released by the Foreign Affairs Select Committee in January 2022 however stated that Johnson had authorised the evacuation, prompting accusations by critics, including the Labour Party, that Johnson has lied. The government however rejected the claims.
