= Masood Ahmed Janjua =

Pakistani businessman missing since 2005

- Born: c. 1975; Rawalpindi, Pakistan
- Occupation: Businessman
- Known for: First documented case of enforced disappearance in Pakistan since war on terror
- Spouse: Amina Masood Janjua

Masood Ahmed Janjua (born; c. 1975) is a Pakistani businessman from Rawalpindi who along with his friend Faisal Faraz, a 25 year old engineer from Lahore, disappeared on 30 July 2005 while traveling from Rawalpindi to Peshawar on a bus. The whereabouts of both are unknown to date. The moment he went missing marked the initial recorded instance of enforced disappearance in Pakistan, igniting a movement in opposition to such occurrences within the country.

In October 2006, the disappearance case of Masood Janjua was taken up by judges of the Pakistan Supreme Court. Multiple individuals who had experienced enforced disappearances provided testimonies, stating that they had seen both Masood and Faisal in the detention center of Rawalpindi City, operated by ISI, Pakistan's military intelligence agency. Despite these accounts, state authorities deny their detention and claim no knowledge regarding their current location.

== Reports about death ==
In September 2013, the Supreme Court of Pakistan was told that Masood Janjua and Faisal Faraz had been killed in South Waziristan Agency but the reports of his death were declared as false and not viable by the Supreme Court.
