= Amanda MacManus =

Amanda MacManus CVO is a former aide to Queen Camilla and a trustee of The Queen's Reading Room.

MacManus was born in South Africa. She began working for Camilla as her personal assistant in September 1997. She was appointed as one of Camilla's three assistant private secretaries in May 2005. Victoria Ward, the deputy Royal Editor of The Daily Telegraph described MacManus as a "de facto" lady-in-waiting to Camilla and wrote that MacManus has been "credited with gradually transforming public perceptions" of Camilla.

In 1998 Camilla (then Camilla Parker Bowles) met Prince William for the first time and the details of their meeting were later leaked to The Sun newspaper. MacManus had been informed of the meeting by Camilla. MacManus then told her husband, who was managing director of The Times supplements, who told a former colleague, who then told John Kay, the chief reporter of The Sun. A statement from Camilla said that MacManus had "resigned" after an investigation as her "position had become untenable". MacManus said that "It is a matter of great regret to me that chance remarks of mine led to the disclosure in the press of the private meeting" between Camilla and William and that she was "so very sorry for the distress this has caused. Above all, my shame is that I have failed those who demand loyalty and trust, particularly my remarkable employer Mrs Parker Bowles". In Spare the 2021 memoir by Prince Harry, Duke of Sussex, Harry claimed it was Camilla who had leaked the story of the meeting. Harry wrote that the articles contained "pinpoint accurate details" of which "none of which had come from [Prince William], of course. They could only have been leaked by the one other person present". In January 2023 a royal source said that "Harry has created a very crisp narrative which in parts is a conflation of different versions of stories". She was reinstated as Camilla's aide a few days later after her resignation after it emerged that she had not briefed the newspaper.

MacManus resigned from Camilla's service in 2022. She joined the board of trustees of The Queen's Reading Room in 2023. MacManus was Camilla's longest serving aide at the time of the Coronation of Charles III and Camilla in 2023, having served her for 23 years. She has two children and lives in South London.

MacManus was appointed a Lieutenant of the Royal Victorian Order (LVO) in the 2014 Queen's Birthday Honours and appointed a Commander (CVO) of the order in the 2022 New Year Honours.
