= Pen Farthing =

British marine and philanthropist

- Born: Paul Farthing; May 1969 (age 57); Essex, England
- Military career
- Branch: Royal Marines
- Rank: Sergeant
- Unit: 42 Commando
- Awards: CNN Hero of the Year 2014
- Other work: Nowzad Dogs charity

Paul "Pen" Farthing (born May 1969) is a British former Royal Marines commando and founder of the Nowzad Dogs charity.

== Personal life ==
Paul Farthing was born in Essex, England. He became a sergeant in the Royal Marines.

== Founding of the Nowzad charity ==
Farthing is the founder of Nowzad Dogs charity and author of a number of books, including Wylie: The Brave Street Dog Who Never Gave Up. In 2006, Farthing was deployed to Afghanistan where he broke up a street dog fight in the town of Nawzad. One of the dogs, later named Nowzad, followed him during his deployment. Farthing sought to bring the dog home to the UK at the end of his deployment, inspiring him to create the animal charity Nowzad Dogs.

== Evacuation of animals from Afghanistan (2021) ==
In August 2021, during the fall of Kabul, Farthing decided to stay in the city until his Afghan staff members, along with their family members (a total of 71 people) were granted permission to leave. Well wishers raised more than £200,000 to charter a flight to evacuate Nowzad's staff, their family members and animals in the charity's shelter.

During the Fall of Kabul, Farthing accused the British Ministry of Defence of blocking the evacuation flight from landing at Hamid Karzai International Airport. The Defence Secretary Ben Wallace rejected these claims, stating his department could not get his staff as well as pets through the Taliban checkpoints and the crowd around the airport, and the plane would have had to wait for hours. He added that he was not going to "prioritise pets over people".

The Government of the United Kingdom granted visas for 68 of the 71 staff and their family members on 23 August, but did not give permission for the evacuation of the charity's animals. Permission was finally granted on 25 August.

On 27 August, the British Armed Forces assisted Farthing and his animals in getting to the airport. He left Afghanistan with them on 28 August as the only passenger on a private jet with 229 seats. The charity's Afghan staff were turned away at an airport checkpoint by the Taliban, who said they did not have the required visa stamps.

=== Controversy ===
During the UK's withrawal from Afghanistan, UK Defence Secretary Ben Wallace said Farthing interfered with efforts to evacuate British nationals and Afghan allies from Kabul, and said he and his supporters were using intimidation tactics and misrepresenting events. The Sunday Times obtained a recording of a threatening voicemail Farthing sent to Peter Quentin, a special adviser to Ben Wallace, accusing him of blocking his flight, while also warning he would "destroy" Quentin if he did not approve the flight and immediately grant travel documents to Farthing's staff and their family members.

Wildlife campaigner Dominic Dyer accused the government of running a "smear campaign" and using him as a scapegoat by leaking the voicemail to hide its own failings in not evacuating more people using the private jet that flew Farthing along with his animals out of Afghanistan. Farthing later apologised for the voicemail, stating that he made it out of frustration.

In December 2021, a Foreign Office whistleblower alleged that Prime Minister Boris Johnson had authorised the evacuation of the animals and Nowzad staff. Johnson however denied the allegation. Two emails sent by Foreign Office officials released by the Foreign Affairs Select Committee in January 2022 however stated that he had been involved in the evacuation, prompting accusations by critics, including the Labour Party, that Johnson had lied. The government, however, rejected the claims.

== 2023 evacuation ==
Farthing was evacuated again from Kabul on 6 January 2023 after Prince Harry, Duke of Sussex, claimed in his memoir Spare that he had killed 25 members of Taliban while serving in Afghanistan. The move was done to avoid "potential reprisal attacks on ex-forces people."

== Awards ==
- Nominated for the RSPCA Animal Hero Awards (2013).
- Awarded "CNN Hero of 2014" by CNN.

== Bibliography ==
- One Dog at a Time: Saving the Strays of Helmand – an Inspiring True Story. St Martin's, 2009. ISBN 9780312607746.
- No Place Like Home: a New Beginning with the Dogs of Afghanistan. Ebury, 2010. ISBN 9780091928841.
- Wylie: The Brave Street Dog Who Never Gave Up. Hodder & Stoughton, 2014. ISBN 9781444799606.
- Operation Ark. Claret Press, 2024. ISBN 9781910461709.
