= Never complain, never explain =

Public relations strategy

"Never complain, never explain" is a public relations strategy that has become particularly associated with the British royal family.

== Origins ==
The phrase is believed to have originated with the former prime minister of the United Kingdom, Benjamin Disraeli. It was attributed to Disraeli by John Morley in 1903, as quoted in Morley's Life of William Ewart Gladstone with the saying originating from "Maxims for a Statesman" by Benjamin Jowett, the Master of Balliol College, Oxford, written between 1873 and 1876. One of Jowett's 11 maxims was "never quarrel, never explain, never hate, never fret, never fail". The surgeon and writer Robert Tuttle Morris wrote in his 1915 book Doctors vs. Folks that "It is well to follow the rule to 'Never complain, never explain'. A man is judged by his character as a whole – not by individual acts."

The writer Walter Bagehot in his 1867 work The English Constitution wrote of the British royal family that "Above all things our royalty is to be reverenced, and if you begin to poke about it you cannot reverence it... Its mystery is its life. We must not let in daylight upon magic". Bagehot's views have been seen as a precursor of "Never complain, never explain", and Queen Victoria and her descendants followed his advice. Lady Elizabeth Bowes-Lyon (the future Queen Elizabeth The Queen Mother) gave a newspaper interview after her engagement to Prince Albert, Duke of York (the future King George VI) which reportedly enraged his father, King George V. She never subsequently spoke or commented on royal issues.

The motto became particularly associated with Queen Elizabeth II and was perceived as crucial to the success of her long reign.

With a less deferential and increasingly aggressive media landscape, the strategy of "Never complain, never explain" was abandoned by Prince Charles (the future King Charles III) and his wife Diana, Princess of Wales, in the 1990s. Charles was the subject of Jonathan Dimbleby's authorised biography The Prince of Wales: A Biography and a subsequent television interview, Charles: The Private Man, the Public Role broadcast in 1994. Diana collaborated with Andrew Morton for his 1992 book Diana: Her True Story and Martin Bashir in a 1995 television interview. It was seen as damaging to the royal family in the 1980s as it left them unable to correct erroneous media stories about themselves.

Prince Harry, Duke of Sussex, the younger son of Charles III, referenced his family's adherence to the motto in a 2023 interview to promote his forthcoming memoir, Spare. He told Anderson Cooper on 60 Minutes that "The family motto is 'never complain, never explain', but it's just a motto ... [Buckingham Palace] will feed or have a conversation with a correspondent, and that correspondent will literally be spoon-fed information and write the story, and at the bottom of it, they will say they have reached out to Buckingham Palace for comment. But the whole story is Buckingham Palace commenting."

Camilla, Duchess of Cornwall (later Queen Camilla), said in a 2017 interview that she was told as a child "Never complain and never explain – just get on with it". The motto has also been described as a favourite of such personalities as Zsa Zsa Gabor, Simon Le Bon, Kate Moss, and Raine Spencer, Countess Spencer.
