= Amina Masood Janjua =

Pakistani human rights activist

- آمنہ مسعود جنجوعہ
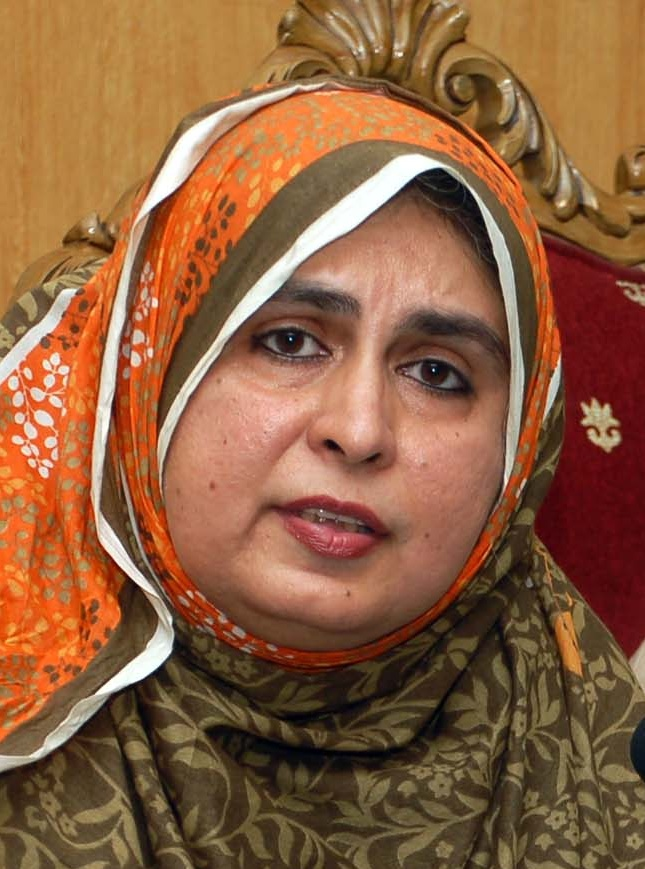

Chairman of Defense of Human Rights Pakistan (DHR)
- Incumbent
- Assumed office 2007
- Preceded by: Abdul Rashid Ghazi

Personal details
- Born: April 28, 1964 (age 62)
- Citizenship: Pakistani
- Spouse: Masood Ahmed Janjua

Amina Masood Janjua, (Urdu: آمنہ مسعود جنجوعہ; born 28 April 1964) is a Pakistani human rights activist and artist. She is recognized for her advocacy against enforced disappearances in Pakistan, particularly following the disappearance of her husband, Masood Ahmed Janjua, on 30 July 2005.

She is chairperson of the Defense of Human Rights Pakistan and Public Service Trust commonly referred to as DHR Pakistan, through which she campaigns for the recovery of missing persons and the protection of civil liberties.

In 2010, the organization was officially registered as a trust and by January 2012, they had registered 1,030 disappearances, of which 400 had been resolved, with the missing person returning to their family.

== Life ==
Janjua and her husband, Masood Ahmed Janjua, had three children (two sons and a daughter) at the time of his disappearance in July 2005. The family lived in Westridge, Rawalpindi, Punjab. Following his disappearance, Amina Janjua continued her husband's work in business and at the College of Information and Technology.

Janjua has represented the organization abroad, including in Manila, Philippines (September 2014) and at the Third World Forum in Buenos Aires, Argentina (March 2023).

Janjua has been involved with protests, rallies and sit ins for the inaction of the Pakistan Government on the issue of enforced disappearance since 2006. Her eldest son, then aged 17, was beaten and arrested at one such protest in 2007. She appears regularly on local and foreign media as the spokesperson of missing persons and occasionally contributes articles in Urdu and English dailies of the country.
