= Federación Nacional Sindical de Trabajadores Salvadoreños =

FENASTRAS
- Federación Nacional Sindical de Trabajadores Salvadoreños
- Founded: 17 November 1972
- Headquarters: 4ª Calle poniente, #2438 "A", Col. Flor Blanca, San Salvador, El Salvador
- Location: El Salvador
- Members: 36,000
- Key people: Juan José Huezo, general secretary
- Affiliations: ITUC
- Website: http://www.fenastras.org

The Federación Nacional Sindical de Trabajadores Salvadoreños (FENASTRAS) is a trade union centre in El Salvador. It was founded in 1924 to bring unity to the country's labor movement, but did not achieve formal legal recognition until 1974. Initially consisting of eleven unions in diverse industries, FENASTRAS grew into the country's principal organized labor front and is affiliated with the International Trade Union Confederation.

In the 1980s, during the country's civil war, FENASTRAS' San Salvador headquarters were located two blocks from the National Police headquarters, and its activities were heavily monitored by the security forces. The Salvadoran and United States governments' regarded FENASTRAS as a political front for rebel Farabundo Marti National Liberation Front (FMLN) guerrillas and thus the organization was a target for harassment and even violent attacks during the civil war. Today, FENASTRAS recognizes that it came under the "influence" of the FMLN.

FENASTRAS' headquarters were bombed on February 22 and September 5, 1989, without loss of life. On October 31 of that year, a more powerful bomb, placed near the building's lunchroom, was detonated when the hall was packed for the mid-day meal. Forty unionists were wounded and nine were killed, including the organization's General Secretary, Febe Elizabeth Velazquez.
