= High Commission of the United Kingdom, Islamabad =

Diplomatic mission of the United Kingdom in Pakistan

British High Commission, Islamabad
- Location: Islamabad, Pakistan
- Address: Diplomatic Enclave, Ramna 5, PO Box 1122
- Coordinates: 33°43′11″N 73°6′30.6″E
- High Commissioner: Jane Marriott
- Deputy High Commissioner: Alison Blackburne
- Website: British High Commission, Islamabad

The British High Commission in Islamabad is the chief diplomatic mission of the United Kingdom in Pakistan. It is located in the Diplomatic Enclave in Islamabad. The current British High Commissioner to Pakistan is Jane Marriott, and the Deputy High Commissioner is Alison Blackburne. The UK also has a Deputy High Commission in Karachi and a Trade and Investment Office in Lahore.

The British High Commission oversees matters pertaining to the bilateral relationship between the UK and Pakistan, and provides consular services to British citizens in Pakistan.

== History ==
The British High Commission consists of a residency building and the main offices which sit across its courtyard. Between the two buildings is an eight feet high plinth statue of Queen Victoria, which was donated by the Punjab government. The complex is described as "a modern two-storeyed stone and concrete construction". Its architect was Adrian Bell, who also designed the British embassy in Brasília. The High Commission is secured by walls, barbed wire and security personnel who guard its entrance.

== See also ==
- List of high commissioners of the United Kingdom to Pakistan
- Pakistan–United Kingdom relations
