= Ahmad Waqass Goraya =

Pakistani activist based in Netherlands

- Born: Pakistan
- Occupations: Activist, Blogger
- Known for: Critic of Pakistan Army, Victim of enforced disappearance, Abduction, Torture, Threats, Attempted murder

Ahmad Waqass Goraya (Urdu: احمد وقاص گورایا) is a Pakistani-born activist and blogger based in the Netherlands. He is among several Pakistani bloggers and authors overseas who are critics of the Pakistan Army who have been persecuted, tortured and threatened. They include Salman Haider, Gul Bukhari, and others.

== Abduction, blasphemy charge and torture ==
In January 2017 Goraya became victim of enforced disappearance along with five other bloggers and were released after several weeks. He was abducted from Lahore on January 4, 2017. He and other activists were tortured by Pakistani intelligence agency ISI in the detention. And later in 2017 he moved back to Netherlands where has been living since 2007.

In March 2017 he was accused of blasphemy by Salman Shahid, associated with Islamabad's Red Mosque. The blasphemy charge was proven false.

== Attack and murder attempt in Netherlands ==
Goraya and his family have been threatened multiple times to silence him. Human Rights Commission of Pakistan and Amnesty International has condemned threatening families to silence activists, especially Goraya.

In February 2020, Goraya was attacked and threatened by two men outside his home in Rotterdam

In February 2021, Goraya was moved out of his residence by Dutch Police citing threats to his life.

In June 2021 a British-Pakistani Muhammad Gohir Khan was charged by Crown Prosecution Service with one count conspiracy to murder of Ahmad Waqass Goraya and found guilty in January 2022 Muhammad Gohir Khan was sentenced to life imprisonment on 11 March 2022 with 13 years minimum time to serve.“The charge was that between the 16th day of February 2021 and the 24th day of June 2021” Khan conspired to Murder Ahmad Waqass Goraya in connivance with unknown persons.

In January 2022 the Crown Prosecution Service revealed that Pakistani Intelligence Services hired Muhammad Gohir Khan to kill Goraya by offering £100,000.

Muhammad Gohir Khan, a UK based Pakistani living in East London, formerly ran a cargo company Worldwide Cargo Services, and was in debt for £200,000. He was contacted through a handler Muzamil, who would have received £20,000 as his cut. Detectives uncovered thousands of messages between Khan and ‘Mudz - also referred to as ‘Ali’ ‘Zed’ and ‘Papa’ - detailing plans for the murder. Muzamil managed to deposit £5000 in a Pakistani bank account of a person named Muhammad Amin Asif. The money was to laundered using the illegal Hundi channel starting with a deposit in Pakistani private bank.
