= High Commission of Pakistan, London =

Diplomatic mission of Pakistan in the United Kingdom

High Commission of Pakistan in London
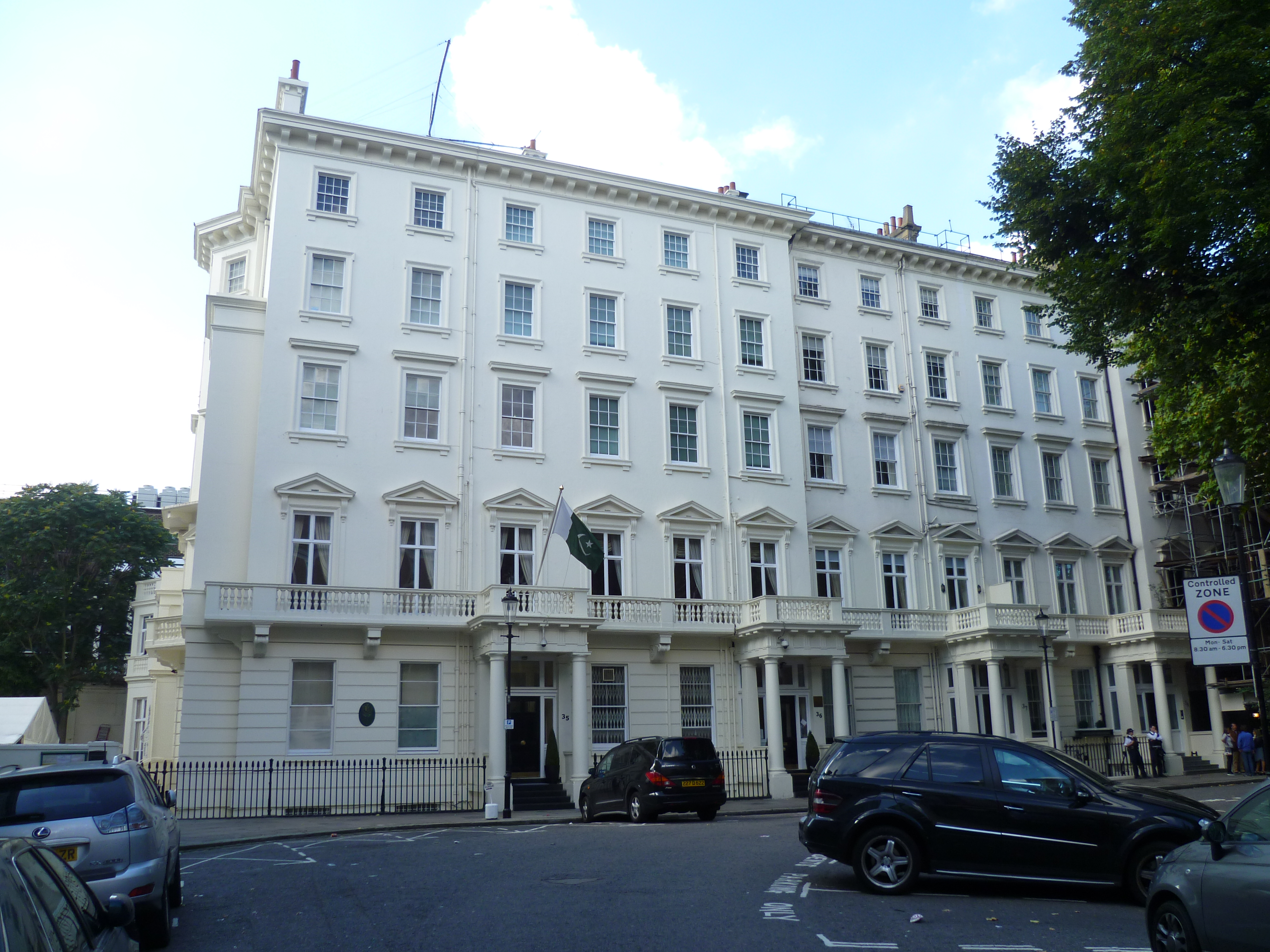
- Location: Belgravia, London
- Address: 35–36 Lowndes Square, London, SW1X 9JN
- Coordinates: 51°29′58.1″N 0°9′31.8″W
- High Commissioner: Moazzam Ahmad Khan

The High Commission of Pakistan in London is the diplomatic mission of Pakistan in the United Kingdom. It is located at 35–36 Lowndes Square, Belgravia. The High Commission's remit includes bilateral relations, support to the Pakistani diaspora, and the promotion of Pakistani interests in Britain.

The High Commission functions under the Ministry of Foreign Affairs of the Government of Pakistan, and provides a wide range of services including visa issuance, passport renewals, document attestation, and consular support for Pakistani nationals in the UK. Its activities include public diplomacy and outreach programs.

== Relations with British Pakistanis ==
The High Commission maintains close ties with the British-Pakistani community. Under the "Explore Pakistan" program, young British Pakistanis are given the opportunity to visit Pakistan and engage with their cultural roots. The mission has also supported the Oxford Pakistan Programme, an academic platform launched in partnership with the University of Oxford, designed to provide scholarships, research opportunities, and academic exchange for Pakistani students and scholars.

== History ==
Pakistan acquired the building during the tenure of former Prime Minister Benazir Bhutto, in recognition of which a commemorative plaque was installed.

== Rumours of sale ==
There have been occasional media reports suggesting the possible sale of the High Commission building; however, no sale has occurred. Pakistani officials have publicly denied such claims, reaffirming the building’s continued use as a key diplomatic asset.
