= British Pakistani (disambiguation) =

British Pakistani or Pakistani British may refer to:

- British people of Pakistani descent and associated topics
- Britons in Pakistan
- Pakistan–United Kingdom relations (cf. "a British-Pakistani treaty" or "Pakistani-British treaty")
- Mixed race people of British and Pakistani descent, in the United Kingdom or Pakistan
  - Anglo-Indians, people of mixed British and South Asian descent with heritage to the era of colonial rule in India
- People with dual citizenship of the United Kingdom and Pakistan
- Of or relating to British India or the period of British rule in India (which included what is now modern Pakistan)
