= British Pakistanis =

Citizens of the United Kingdom whose ancestral roots lie in Pakistan

برطانوی پاکستانی
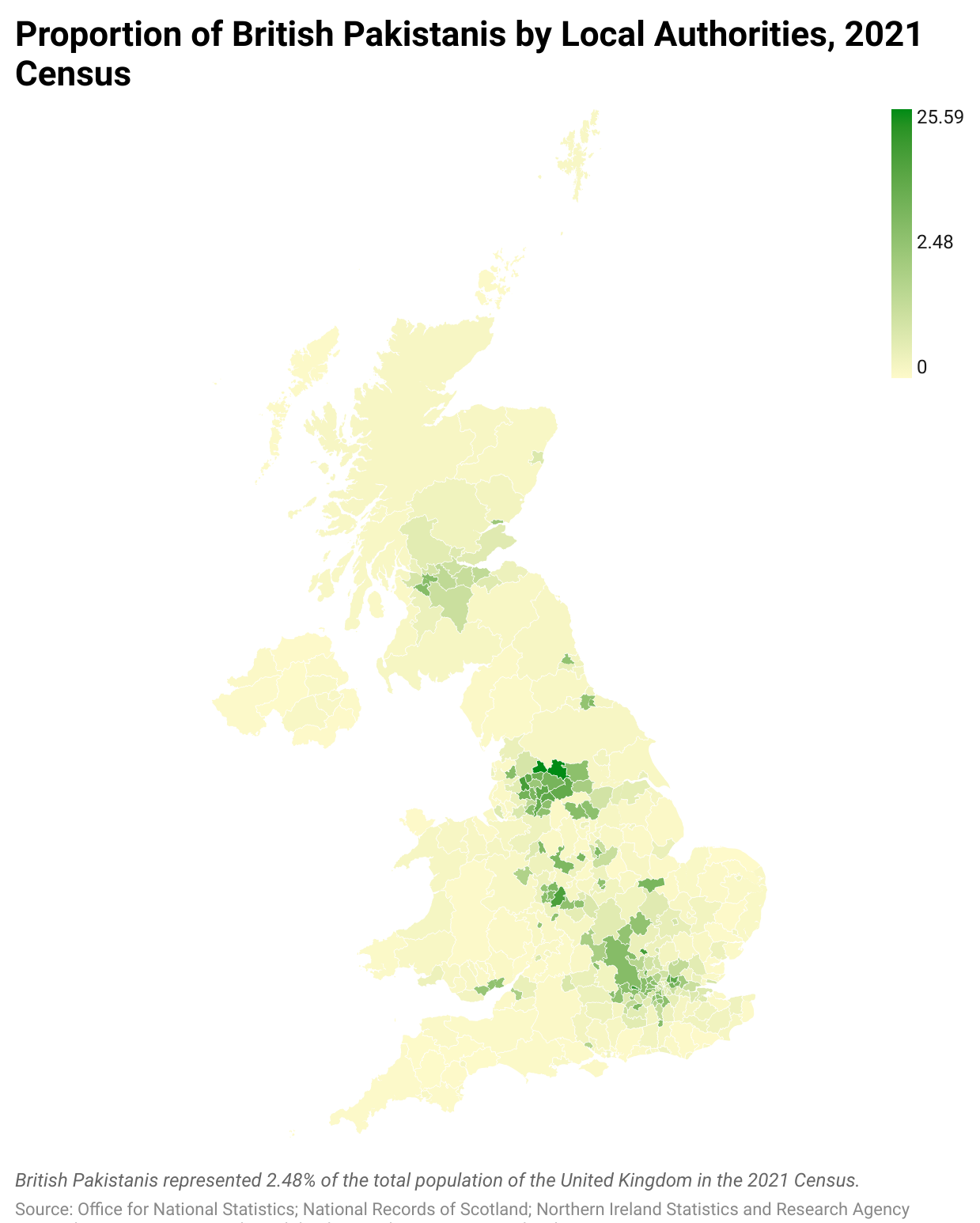
- Distribution of British Pakistanis by Local Authority, 2021/22 Census

Total population
- United Kingdom: 1,662,286 – 2.5% (2021); England: 1,570,285 – 2.8% (2021); Scotland: 72,871 – 1.3% (2022); Wales: 17,534 – 0.6% (2021); Northern Ireland: 1,596 – 0.08% (2021)

Regions with significant populations
- London; Birmingham; Bradford; Manchester; Kirklees; Luton; Slough; Oldham

Languages
- English (British and Pakistani) · Urdu · Punjabi (Note: Various dialects; particularly Pahari-Pothwari amongst British Mirpuris) · Pashto · Sindhi · Balochi · Brahui · Kashmiri · Khowar · Shina · Balti · others

Religion
- Mostly Islam (92.6%); Minority Others (2.2%) (Note: Including Christianity (0.8%), Hinduism (0.1%), Sikhism (0.04%), Judaism (0.02%) and Buddhism (0.01%), irreligious (1.2%)); 2021 census, NI, England and Wales only

Related ethnic groups
- British Indians; British Bangladeshis; British Afghans; British Asians; Pakistanis; Pakistani diaspora; Mirpuri diaspora; Punjabi diaspora; Sindhi diaspora; Pashtun diaspora

British Pakistanis or Pakistani Britons are Britons or residents of the United Kingdom with ancestral roots in Pakistan. This includes people born in the UK who are of Pakistani descent, Pakistani-born people who have migrated to the UK and those of Pakistani origin from overseas who migrated to the UK.

The UK hosts the largest Pakistani community in Europe, with over 1.6 million people recorded in the 2021 Census. British Pakistanis are the second-largest ethnic minority group in the United Kingdom and the second-largest subgroup of British Asians. They also form one of the largest populations within the global Pakistani diaspora, comparable in size to the Pakistani community in the UAE.

Migration from regions that now form Pakistan began in small numbers during the 1950s and 1960s, facilitated by Pakistan’s membership of the Commonwealth. Many migrants were recruited to address labour shortages in industries such as textiles, steel, engineering, manufacturing, while others, including doctors, contributed to the development of the National Health Service.

The British Pakistani population has grown from around 10,000 in 1951 to over 1.6 million in 2021. The majority reside in England, with significant communities in Scotland and smaller populations in Wales and Northern Ireland. In 2021, there were 1,587,819 Pakistanis in England and Wales (2.7% of the population). Scotland recorded 72,871 (1.3%) in 2022, while Northern Ireland recorded 1,596 people (less than 0.1%).

The community is predominantly Muslim; around 93% of Pakistanis in England and Wales identified as Muslim in the 2021 Census.

While the community has historically experienced higher relative poverty rates, more recent data indicates progress in areas such as homeownership, where they have among the highest rates in England and Wales.

== History ==
=== Pre-Independence ===
The earliest period of Asian migration to Britain has not been ascertained. It is known that Romani (Gypsy) groups such as the Romanichal and Kale arrived in the region during the Middle Ages, having originated from what is now North India and Pakistan and travelled westward to Europe via Southwest Asia around 1000 CE, intermingling with local populations over several centuries.

Immigration from what is now Pakistan to the United Kingdom began long before Pakistan's independence in 1947. Muslim immigrants from Kashmir, Punjab, Sindh, the North-West Frontier and Balochistan and other parts of South Asia, arrived in the British Isles as early as the mid-seventeenth century as employees of the East India Company, typically as lashkars and sailors in British port cities. These immigrants were often the first Asians to be seen in British port cities and were initially perceived as indolent due to their reliance on Christian charities. Despite this, some of the early Pakistani immigrants married local white British women because there were few Pakistani women in Britain.

Many early Pakistanis came to the UK as scholars and studied at major British institutions, before later returning to British India. An example of such a person is Muhammad Ali Jinnah, the founder of Pakistan. Jinnah came to the UK in 1892 and began an apprenticeship at Graham's Shipping and Trading Company. After completing his apprenticeship, Jinnah joined Lincoln's Inn, where he trained as a barrister. At 19, he became the youngest person from South Asia to be called to the bar in Britain.

=== British interwar period ===
Most early Pakistani settlers (then part of the British Raj) and their families moved from port towns to the Midlands, as Britain declared war on Germany in 1939, many expatriates mainly hailing from the Kashmir city of Mirpur worked in munitions factories in Birmingham. After the war, most of these early settlers stayed on in the region and took advantage of an increase in the number of jobs. These settlers were later joined by their families.

In 1932, the Indian National Congress survey of 'all Indians outside India' (of which Pakistani regions were then a part) estimated that there were 7,128 Indians in the United Kingdom.

There were 832,500 Muslim Indian soldiers in 1945; most of these recruits were from what is now Pakistan. These soldiers fought alongside the British Army during the First and Second World Wars, particularly in the former during the Western Front and in the latter, during the Battle of France, the North African Campaign and the Burma Campaign. Many contributed to the war effort as skilled labourers, including as assembly-line workers in the aircraft factory at Castle Bromwich, Birmingham, which produced Spitfire fighter aircraft. Most returned to South Asia after their service, although many of these former soldiers returned to Britain in the 1950s and 1960s to fill labour shortages.

=== Post-Independence ===
Following the Second World War, the decline of the British Empire led to several economic problems for the United Kingdom. Following the establishment of Pakistan in 1947, migration from Pakistan to the United Kingdom was welcomed to compensate British economic problems, particularly during the 1950s and 1960s. Many migrants were part of post-partition movements, including those who had first relocated to Pakistan from India but due to discrimination moved to Britain as secondary migrants. Migration was facilitated by Pakistan’s membership of the Commonwealth of Nations and active recruitment by British employers to address labour shortages in key industries.

As Commonwealth citizens, Pakistanis were granted broad civic rights and found employment primarily in the textile industries of Lancashire and Yorkshire, manufacturing in the West Midlands, and in car production and food processing in towns such as Luton and Slough. Many worked night shifts and in lower-paid or less desirable roles.

A significant proportion of migrants originated from Mirpur in Kashmir following the construction of the Mangla Dam in the late 1950s, which displaced thousands of people. Around 5,000 displaced individuals migrated to Britain, supported in part by compensation schemes and assistance linked to the British contractors involved in the project. Migration also continued from other regions, particularly Punjab, contributing to the growth of settled communities across the Midlands and northern England, as well as areas of London such as Southall.

During the 1960s, a growing number of educated Pakistanis, including teachers, doctors and engineers, migrated to the UK, often settling in London due to wider employment opportunities. Large numbers of medical professionals were recruited directly into the National Health Service, where they formed a significant part of the workforce. By the late 1960s, labour migration began to decline.

Additional migration flows included people from East Pakistan (now Bangladesh) and South Asians expelled from East Africa, particularly from Uganda in 1972 under the regime of Idi Amin. Immigration controls introduced through the Commonwealth Immigrants Act 1962 and the Immigration Act 1971 restricted primary migration, although family reunification remained permitted.

Early Pakistani migrants often intended to return home, but this pattern shifted towards permanent settlement, particularly after immigration restrictions and changing economic and social circumstances encouraged family reunification and long-term residence in Britain.

During the 1970s, deindustrialisation in the UK disproportionately affected communities concentrated in manufacturing regions, including many British Pakistanis in the Midlands and Northern England. In response, increasing numbers turned to self-employment; by 2004, around one in seven British Pakistani men worked as taxi drivers or chauffeurs.

While some studies have reported higher measured poverty rates within the community, outcomes vary and have changed over time. British Pakistanis have relatively high levels of homeownership in England and Wales, and are widely represented across sectors including business, self-employment and the professions. Measures of income and poverty may not fully reflect economic circumstances in all cases, particularly where earnings are variable or derived from self-employment.

== Demographics ==
British Pakistanis by region and country
Region / Country	2021 (Note: 2021/22: England and Wales, Scotland, and Northern Ireland)		2011 (Note: 2011: England and Wales, Scotland, and Northern Ireland)		2001 (Note: 2001: England and Wales, Scotland, and Northern Ireland)		1991 (Note: 1991: Great Britain. Northern Ireland did not record ethnic group data in the 1991 census.)	
Region / Country	Number	%	Number	%	Number	%	Number	%
West Midlands	319,165	5.36%	227,248	4.06%	154,550	2.93%	98,612	1.91%
North West	303,611	4.09%	189,436	2.69%	116,968	1.74%	77,150	1.15%
Yorkshire and the Humber	296,437	5.41%	225,892	4.28%	146,330	2.95%	94,820	1.96%
Greater London	290,549	3.30%	223,797	2.74%	142,749	1.99%	87,816	1.31%
South East	145,311	1.57%	99,246	1.15%	58,520	0.73%	35,946	0.48%
East of England	99,452	1.57%	66,270	1.13%	38,790	0.72%	24,713	0.49%
East Midlands	71,038	1.46%	48,940	1.08%	27,829	0.67%	17,407	0.44%
North East	27,290	1.03%	19,831	0.76%	14,074	0.56%	9,257	0.36%
South West	17,432	0.31%	11,622	0.22%	6,729	0.14%	3,925	0.09%
England Total	1,570,285	2.78%	1,112,282	2.10%	706,539	1.44%	449,646	0.96%
Scotland	72,871 (Note: Scotland held its census a year later after the rest of the United Kingdom due to the COVID-19 pandemic. As a result, data shown is for 2022 as opposed to 2021.)	1.34%	49,381	0.93%	31,793	0.63%	21,192	0.42%
Wales	17,534	0.56%	12,229	0.40%	8,287	0.29%	5,717	0.20%
Northern Ireland	1,596	0.08%	1,091	0.06%	668	0.04%	—N/a	—N/a
United Kingdom	1,662,286	2.48%	1,174,602	1.86%	747,285	1.27%	476,555 (Note: 1991 figures excludes Northern Ireland)	0.87%

=== Population ===
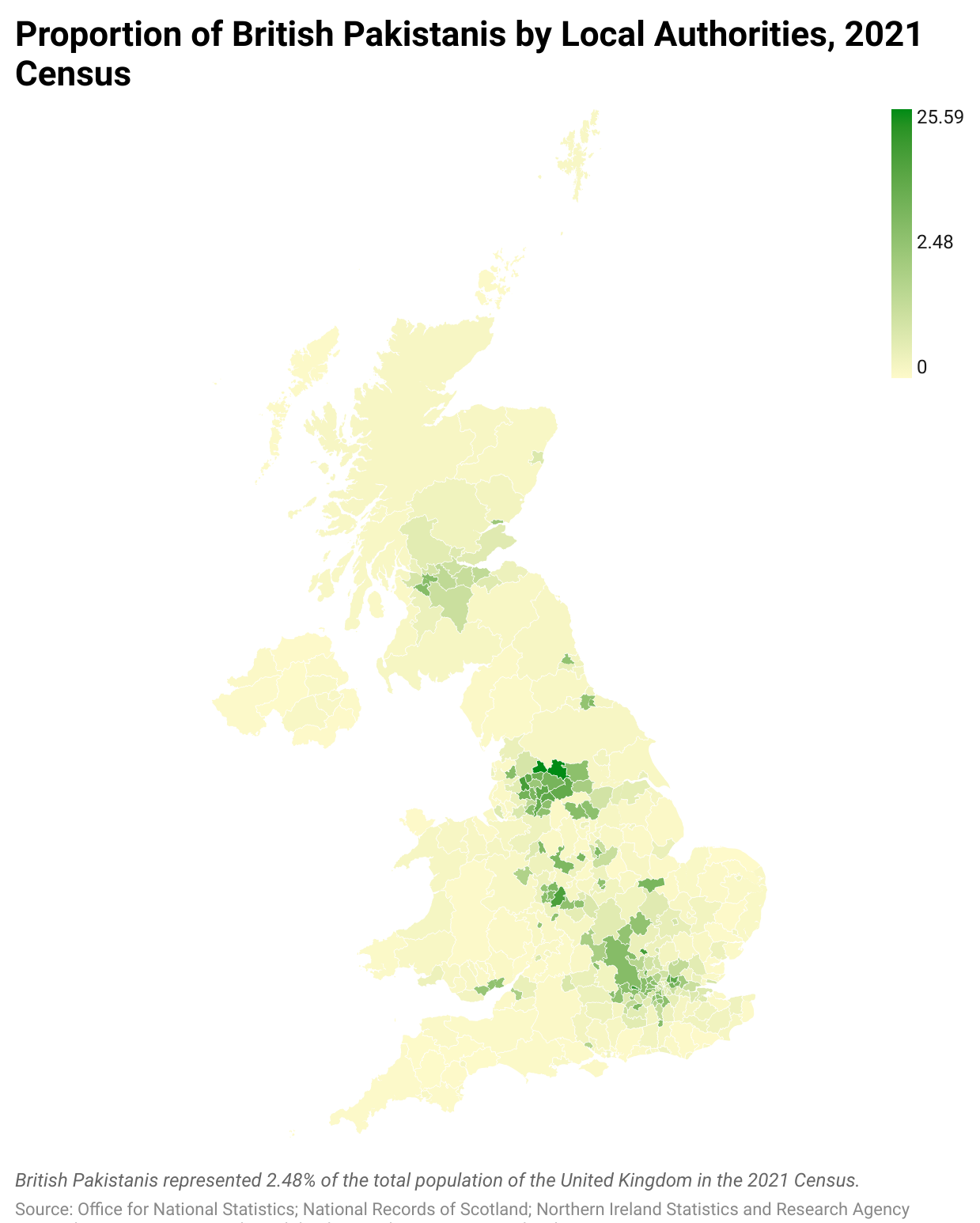
Distribution of British Pakistanis by local authority, 2021 census

Population pyramid of Asian or Asian British Pakistanis in 2021 (in England and Wales).

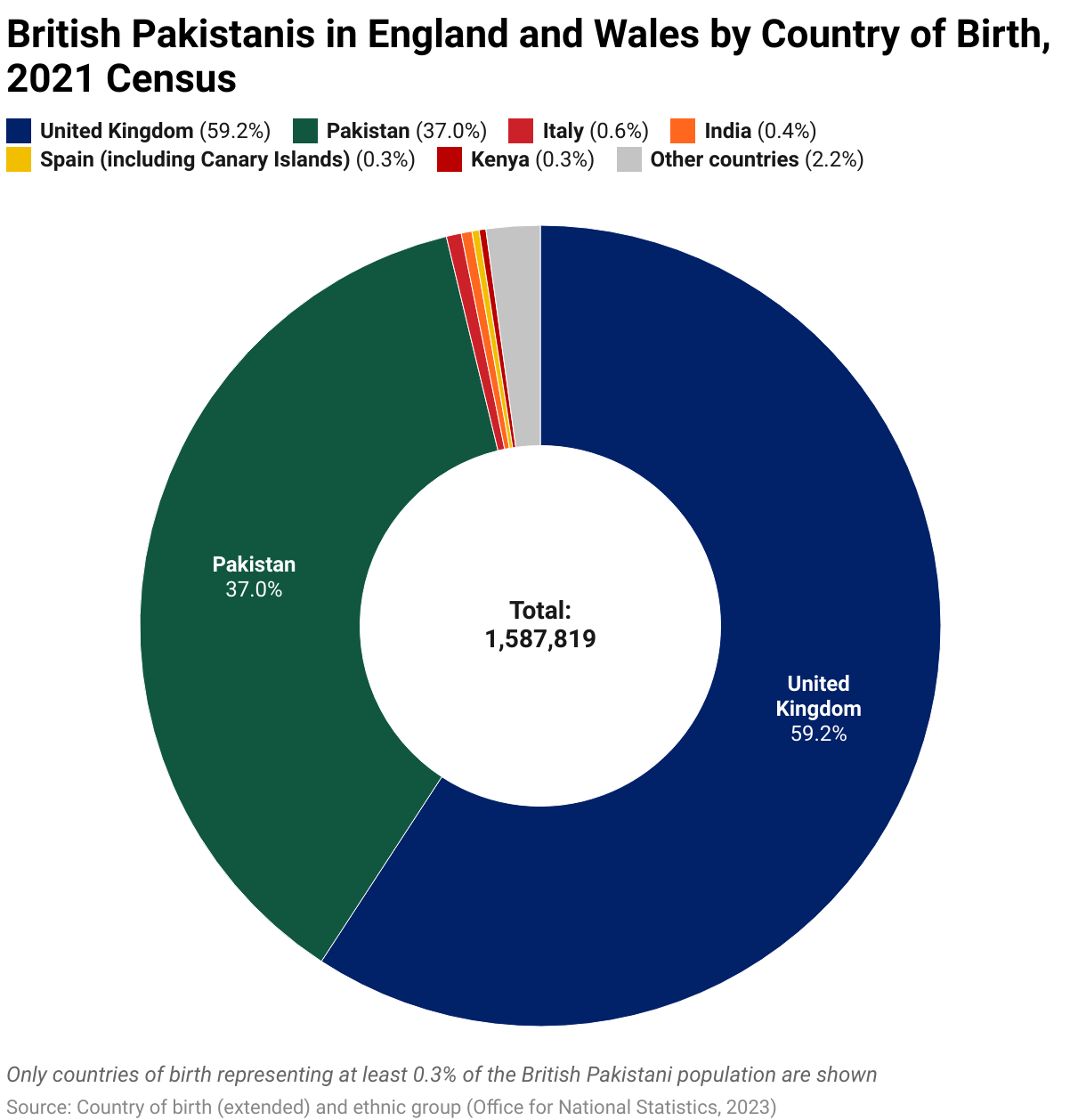
Country of birth (2021 census, England and Wales)

According to the 2021 Census, Pakistanis in England and Wales enumerated 1,587,819 or 2.7% of the population. According to estimates by the Office for National Statistics, the number of people born in Pakistan living in the UK in 2021 was 456,000, which makes it the third most common country of birth in the UK.

The ten local authorities with the largest proportion of people who identified as Pakistani were: Pendle (25.59%), Bradford (25.54%), Slough (21.65%), Luton (18.26%), Blackburn with Darwen (17.79%), Birmingham (17.04%), Redbridge (14.18%), Rochdale (13.64%), Oldham (13.55%) and Hyndburn (13.16%). In Scotland, the highest proportion was in East Renfrewshire at 5.25%; in Wales, the highest concentration was in Newport at 3.01%; and in Northern Ireland, the highest concentration was in Belfast at 0.14%.

The Pakistan government's Ministry of Overseas Pakistanis estimates that 1.26 million Pakistanis eligible for dual nationality live in the UK, constituting well over half of the total number of Pakistanis in Europe. Up to 250,000 Pakistanis come to the UK each year, for work, to visit or other purposes. Likewise, up to 270,000 British citizens travel to Pakistan each year, mainly to visit family. Excluding British citizens of Pakistani descent, the number of individuals living in the UK with a Pakistani passport was estimated at 188,000 in 2017, making Pakistan the eighth most common non-British nationality in the UK.

The majority of British Pakistanis originate from the Azad Kashmir region, with a smaller number from other parts of Pakistan including Punjab, Sindh, Khyber Pakhtunkhwa, Gilgit-Baltistan and Balochistan.

The cities or districts with the largest communities, by Pakistani ethnicity in the England and Wales 2021 census, are as follows: Birmingham (pop. 195,102), Bradford (139,553), Manchester (65,875), Kirklees (54,795), Redbridge (44,000) and Luton (41,143).

==== Historic ====
In the 2011 UK Census, 1,174,983 residents classified themselves as ethnically Pakistani (excluding people of mixed ethnicity), regardless of their birthplace; 1,112,212 of them lived in England. This represented an increase of 427,000 over the 747,285 residents recorded in the 2001 UK Census.

Demographer Ceri Peach has estimated the number of British Pakistanis in the 1951 to 1991 censuses. He back-projected the ethnic composition of the 2001 census to the estimated minority populations during previous census years. The results are as follows:

Year	Population (rounded to nearest 1,000)
1951 (estimate)	10,000
1961 (estimate)	25,000
1971 (estimate)	119,000
1981 (estimate)	296,000
1991 (estimate)	477,000
2001 (census)	747,000
2011 (census)	1,175,000

=== Population distribution ===
Birthplace/year of arrival of British Pakistanis in England and Wales (2021 census)
1. Born in the UK (59.2%)
2. Before 1950 (0.00%)
3. 1951 to 1960 (0.30%)
4. 1961 to 1970 (3.10%)
5. 1971 to 1980 (3.90%)
6. 1981 to 1990 (3.40%)
7. 1991 to 2000 (5.70%)
8. 2001 to 2010 (10.5%)
9. 2011 to 2021 (13.9%)

At the time of the 2021 Census, the local authorities with the largest proportion of British Pakistanis were Pendle (25.59%), Bradford (25.54%), Slough (21.65%), Luton (18.26%) and Blackburn with Darwen (17.79%). The distribution of people describing their ethnicity as Pakistani in England, Scotland, Wales and Northern Ireland was as follows:

Region	Number of British Pakistanis	Percentage of total British Pakistani population	British Pakistanis as percentage of region's population	Significant Communities
England	1,570,285		2.80%	
West Midlands	319,165		5.40%	Birmingham - 17.0% Walsall - 6.9% Stoke-On-Trent - 6.0% Dudley - 4.6% Sandwell - 6.5% East Staffordshire - 7.0%
North West England	303,611		4.10%	Pendle - 25.6% Rochdale - 13.6% Oldham - 13.5% Blackburn With Darwen - 17.8% Manchester - 11.9% Burnley - 10.7% Bury - 7.8% Bolton - 9.4% Hyndburn - 13.2%
Yorkshire and the Humber	296,437		5.40%	Bradford - 25.5% Kirklees - 12.6% Calderdale - 8.5% Sheffield - 5.0% Leeds - 3.9%
London	290,459		3.30%	London Borough of Waltham Forest - 10.3% London Borough of Newham - 8.9% London Borough of Redbridge - 14.2%
South East England	145,311		1.60%	Slough - 21.7% Buckinghamshire - 5.3% Woking - 7.0% Crawley - 5.2% Reading - 4.8% Oxford - 4.1% Windsor and Maidenhead - 4.0%
East of England	99,452		1.60%	Luton - 18.3% Peterborough - 7.9% Watford - 8.0%
East Midlands	71,038		1.50%	Derby - 8.0% Nottingham - 6.7% Leicester - 3.4% Oadby and Wigston - 4.0%
North East England	27,290		1.00%	Newcastle-Upon-Tyne - 2.9% Middlesbrough - 6.2% Stockton-On-Tees - 2.5%
South West England	17,432		0.30%	Bristol - 1.9%
Scotland	72,871		1.34%	Glasgow - 5.0% Edinburgh - 1.5% East Renfrewshire - 5.3% North Lanarkshire - 1.5%
Wales	17,534		0.60%	Cardiff - 2.4% Newport - 3.0%
Northern Ireland	1,596		0.08%	Belfast - 0.14%
Total UK	1,662,286		2.48%	

==== London ====
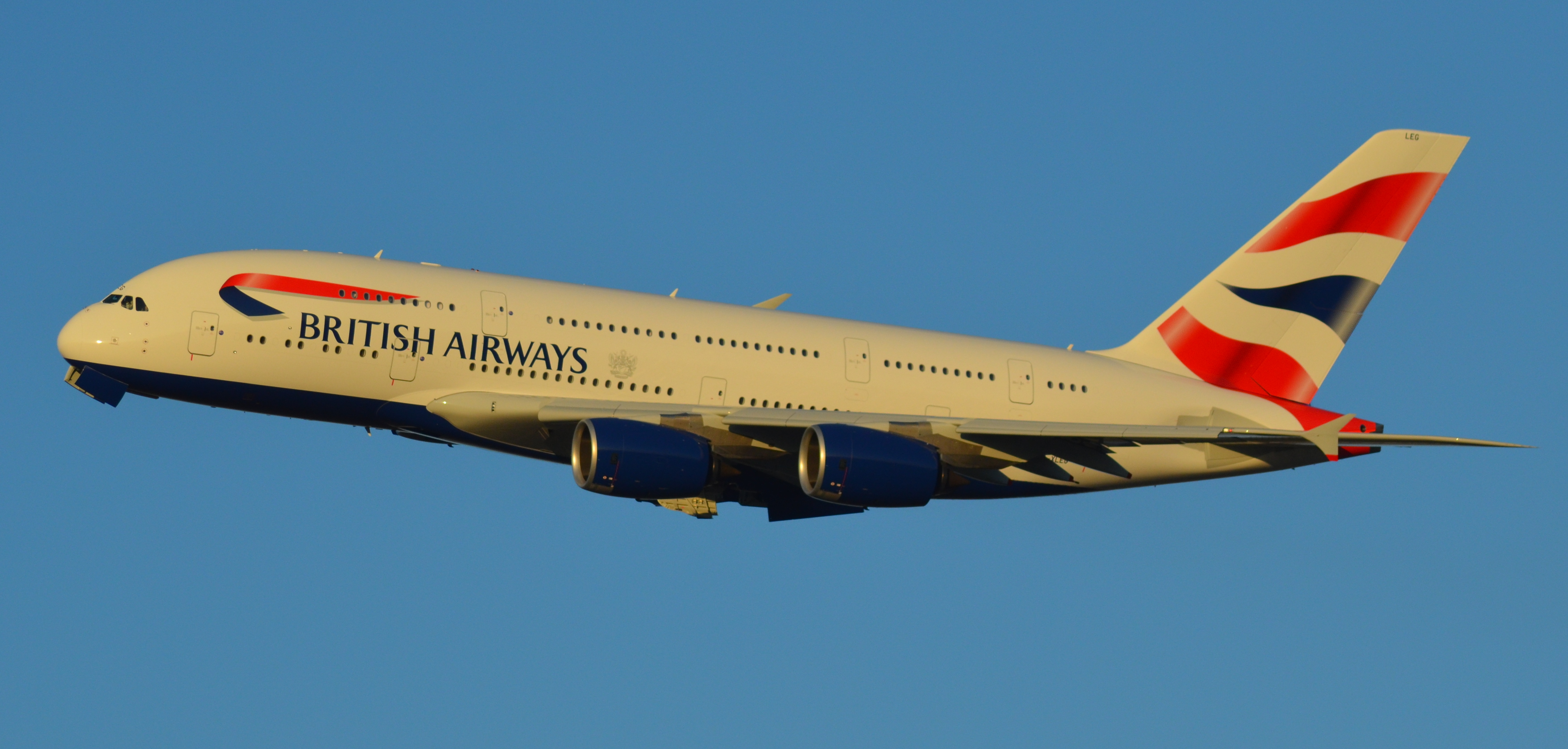
A return of British Airways was reported as one of Imran Khan's greatest achievements.

Greater London has the largest Pakistani community in the United Kingdom. The 2021 Census recorded 290,549 Pakistanis living in London. However, it only forms 3.3% of London's population, which is significantly lower than other British cities. The population is very diverse, with comparable numbers of Punjabis, Pashtuns and Muhajirs, and smaller communities of Sindhis and Balochs. This mix makes the Pakistani community of London more diverse than other UK communities, whereas a high proportion of Pakistani communities in Northern England came from Azad Kashmir.

The largest concentrations are in East London, especially in Redbridge, Waltham Forest, Newham and Barking and Dagenham. Significant communities can also be found in the boroughs of Ealing, Hounslow, and Hillingdon in West London and Merton, Wandsworth and Croydon in South London.

==== Birmingham ====
Birmingham has the second-largest Pakistani community in the United Kingdom. The 2021 Census recorded that there were 195,102 Pakistanis living in Birmingham, making up 17% of the city's total population.

The largest concentrations are in Sparkhill, Alum Rock, Small Heath and Sparkbrook.

==== Bradford ====
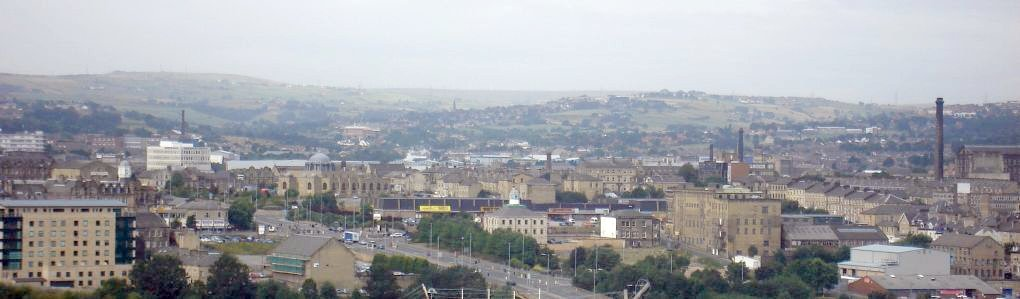
Bradford, in the north of England, is considered to be a typical "mill and mosque town" due to its large Pakistani community.

Bradford has the third-largest Pakistani community in the United Kingdom. The 2021 Census recorded 139,553 Pakistanis, making up 25.5% of the city's total population.

The largest concentrations are in Manningham, Toller, Bradford Moor, Heaton, Little Horton and Keighley.

==== Manchester ====
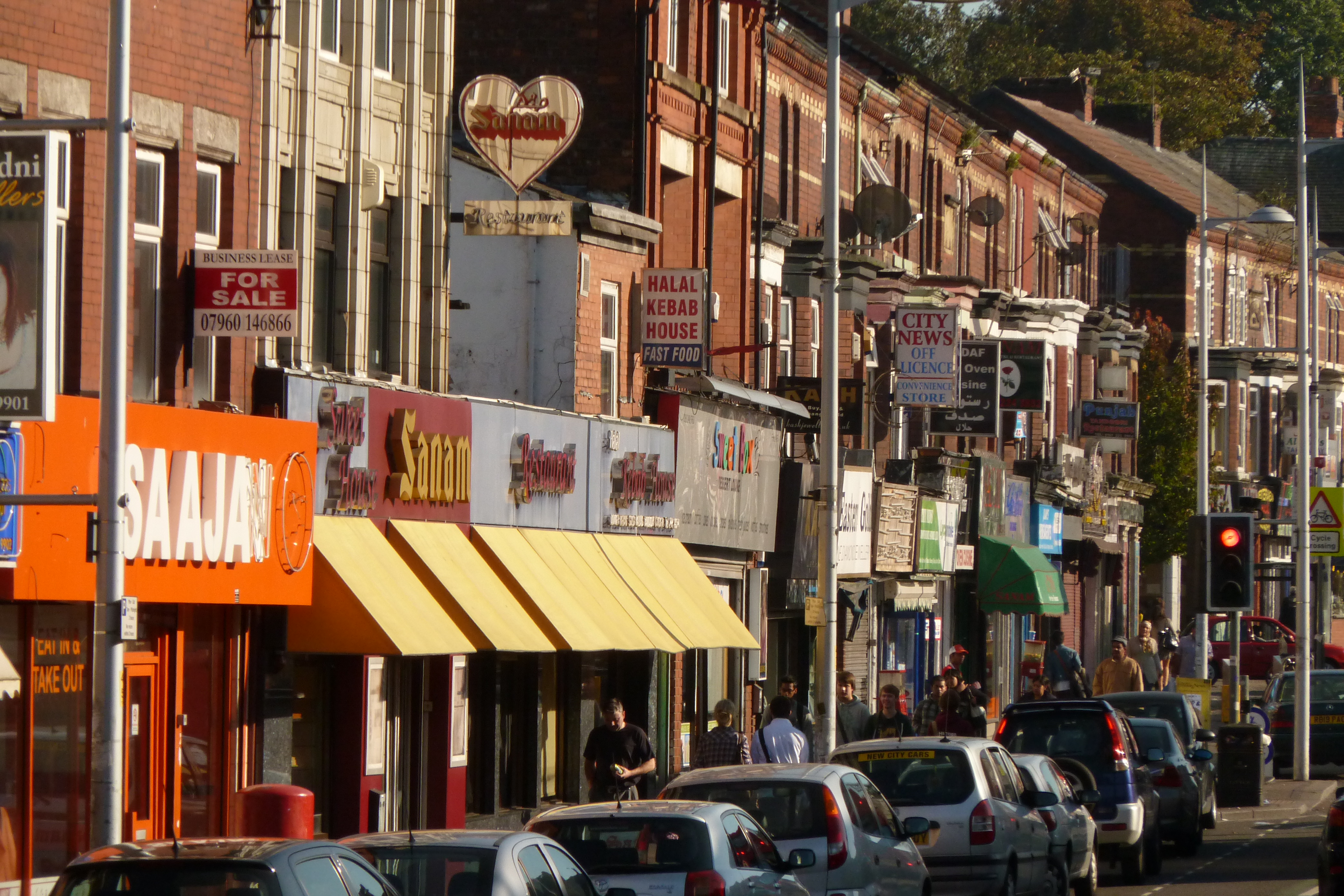
The Curry Mile on Wilmslow Road in Manchester is home to a myriad of Pakistani bakers, delicatessens and handmade jewellery in addition to several halal restaurants and take-aways.

Manchester has the fourth-largest Pakistani community in the United Kingdom. The 2021 Census recorded 65,875 Pakistanis, making up 11.9% of the city's total population.

The largest concentrations are in Longsight, Cheetham Hill, Rusholme and Crumpsall.

In the wider area of Greater Manchester, there were 209,061 Pakistanis, making up 7.3% of the population. The towns of Oldham and Rochdale have significant Pakistani populations, at 13.5% and 13.6% respectively.

A significant number of Manchester-based Pakistani business families have moved down the A34 road to live in the affluent Heald Green area. The late Professor Pnina Werbner associated the suburban movement of Pakistani-origin Muslims in Manchester with the formation of "gilded ghettoes" in the sought-after commuter suburbs of Cheshire.

==== Luton ====
The 2021 Census recorded 41,143 Pakistanis in Luton, making up 18.3% of the total population.

The largest concentrations are in Bury Park, Dallow and Challney.

==== Glasgow ====
The 2022 Census recorded 30,912 Pakistanis in Glasgow, making up 4.98% of the city's total population.

There are large Pakistani communities throughout the city, notably in the Pollokshields area of South Glasgow, where there are said to be some 'high standard' Pakistani takeaways and Asian fabric shops.

Pakistanis also make up the largest 'visible' ethnic minority in Scotland, representing nearly one-third of the non-White ethnic minority population.

=== Languages ===
Most British Pakistanis speak English, and those who were born in the UK consider British English to be their first language. First-generation and recent immigrants speak Pakistani English. Urdu, the national language of Pakistan, is understood and spoken by many British Pakistanis at a native level, and is the fourth-most commonly spoken language in the UK. Some secondary schools and colleges teach Urdu for GCSEs and A Levels. Madrassas also offer it. According to Sajid Mansoor Qaisrani, Urdu language periodicals of the 1990s published in UK used to focus exclusively on South Asian issues, with no relevance to British society. Coverage of local British issues and problems of local Pakistanis in the UK used to be sparse. Beyond Pakistani youth's interest in identifying with their ethnicity and religious identity, Urdu was of little use to them in finding suitable employment opportunities.

The majority of Pakistanis in Britain are from Azad Kashmir and the neighbouring Pothohar Plateau in Northern Punjab who speak Pahari-Pothwari or Pakistani Pahari langauge as their mother tongue. Due to this Pahari-Pothwari is the second most spoken mother tongue in the UK, even surpassing Welsh.

As a large proportion of Pakistanis in Britain are from Punjab, Punjabi is commonly spoken amongst Pakistanis in Britain. Other Punjabi dialects are spoken in Britain, making Punjabi the third-most commonly spoken language.

Other significant Pakistani languages spoken include Pashto, Saraiki, Sindhi, Balochi and a minority of others. These languages are not only spoken by British Pakistanis, but by other groups such as British Indians, British Afghans or British Iranians.

=== Diaspora ===
Many British Pakistanis have emigrated from the UK, establishing a diaspora of their own. There are around 80,000 Britons in Pakistan, a substantial number of whom are British Pakistanis who have resettled in Pakistan. The town of Mirpur in Azad Kashmir, where the majority of British Pakistanis hail from, has a large expatriate population of resettled British Pakistanis and is dubbed "Little England".

Other British Pakistanis have migrated elsewhere to Europe, North America, Western Asia and Australia. Dubai, in the UAE, remains a popular destination for British Pakistani expatriates to live although there is no minimum wage and few anti-racism groups.

Pakistanis in Hong Kong were given full British citizenship in 1997 during the handover of Hong Kong, when it ceased being a British colony to prevent them being made stateless. Previously, as Hong Kong residents, they held the status of British Overseas Territories citizens.

== Religion ==
Over 90% of Pakistanis in the UK are Muslims. The largest proportion of these belong to the Sunni branch of Islam, mainly Deobandi (of the Tablighi Jamaat) and Sunni Barelvi, with a significant minority belonging to the Shia branch.

Mosques, community centres and religious youth organisations play an integral part in British Pakistani social life.

Religion	England and Wales			
Religion	2011		2021	
Religion	Number	%	Number	%
Islam	1,028,459	91.46%	1,470,775	92.63%
No religion	12,041	1.07%	18,533	1.17%
Christianity	17,118	1.52%	12,327	0.78%
Hinduism	3,879	0.34%	1,407	0.09%
Sikhism	3,283	0.29%	590	0.04%
Judaism	440	0.04%	264	0.02%
Buddhism	700	0.06%	230	0.01%
Other religions	588	0.05%	1,005	0.06%
Not Stated	58,003	5.16%	82,691	5.21%
Total	1,124,511	100%	1,587,822	100%

== Culture ==
British Pakistani culture reflects the community's regional origins in Pakistan and its development within British society. Cultural traditions include celebrations of Pakistan Independence Day on 14 August, while Ramadan, Eid al-Fitr and Eid al-Adha are widely observed among the predominantly Muslim population. British Pakistanis have also contributed to the development of South Asian festivals, commercial districts, restaurants, cultural institutions and recreational activities throughout the United Kingdom.

=== Festivals and celebrations ===
British Pakistanis participate in melas, outdoor South Asian cultural festivals featuring music, performances, food and community activities. The Sandwell and Birmingham Mela, held in Smethwick, is among Britain's largest South Asian cultural festivals, attracting more than 60,000 visitors in 2023.

Bradford Mela, first held in 1988, became one of Britain's earliest large-scale South Asian cultural festivals and helped establish a model for similar events elsewhere. The tradition was revived through Bradford City Mela in August 2026, featuring South Asian music, food, fashion and community performances in City Park and Centenary Square.

Public celebrations of Islamic festivals also take place in major British cities, including Eid in the Square in London's Trafalgar Square, bringing together Muslims from different ethnic and cultural backgrounds.

=== Retail and commercial districts ===
The Bradford Mall, an Asian shopping centre on Leeds Road in Bradford, photographed in 2023.

British Pakistani entrepreneurs have contributed to established South Asian commercial districts across Britain, particularly in cities such as Bradford, Birmingham, Manchester and London, and towns including Blackburn, Oldham, Rochdale and Luton. These districts commonly contain independent retailers specialising in South Asian clothing, jewellery, groceries and wedding services, alongside restaurants, cafés and other businesses.

In Bradford, Leeds Road and the surrounding Thornbury and Bradford Moor areas form a prominent South Asian commercial corridor. Bradford Plaza, near Thornbury, consists of specialist retail premises selling Asian clothing, footwear and jewellery. A 2019 Bradford Council study identified approximately 50 units across Bradford Plaza and an adjoining development, highlighting their contribution to the district's retail facilities. The Bradford Mall, at 900 Leeds Road, is another shopping complex containing South Asian fashion and jewellery retailers.

The city has also seen the development of larger Asian shopping centres. In May 2026, Signature Mall opened in Listerhills following the conversion of a former gym on Preston Street. The development brought together 36 shops and nine food businesses, including retailers specialising in South Asian fashion, jewellery and wedding clothing.

Independent shops on Alum Rock Road in Birmingham, photographed in July 2021.

Elsewhere, Sparkhill, Alum Rock and Ladypool Road in Birmingham are associated with South Asian retail and hospitality businesses. In Blackburn, Whalley Range Bazaar is known for its concentration of Asian clothing and jewellery retailers, grocery shops, cafés and restaurants.

In east London, Green Street in Newham is an established South Asian shopping destination. The East Shopping Centre, which opened in 2015, brought together specialist Asian fashion, jewellery and wedding retailers in a purpose-built arcade. In Luton, Bury Park is similarly associated with South Asian retail, grocery and food businesses.

=== Restaurants, bakeries and café culture ===
Sanam, a South Asian sweet shop and restaurant on Leeds Road, Bradford, photographed in 2023.

British Pakistani restaurateurs have contributed to the development of South Asian dining in the United Kingdom, from traditional curry houses and sweet shops to contemporary restaurants, halal fast-food outlets and chai cafés. These establishments have introduced regional Pakistani and Kashmiri foods to wider British audiences while adapting menus and dining traditions to changing tastes.

Among the earliest examples is Bradford's Sweet Centre, established in 1964 by brothers Abdul Rehman and Mohammed Bashir. It initially served South Asian sweets, snacks and cooked dishes to Pakistani and Indian migrant workers before becoming a longstanding part of the city's restaurant culture. In 1977, Mohammed Sabir established the first Aagrah restaurant in Shipley, specialising in Kashmiri cuisine. The family-run business subsequently expanded across Yorkshire and introduced packaged cooking sauces based on its restaurant dishes.

Other Bradford-founded restaurants developed into regional chains. Akbar's, established in 1995 by Shabir Hussain, expanded into cities including Leeds, Manchester, Birmingham and Glasgow, becoming associated with its distinctive presentation of large naan breads on vertical stands. MyLahore, founded in 2002 by cousins Asghar Ali, Shakoor Ahmed and Ishfaq Farooq, developed a style of British Asian dining combining Pakistani dishes with British favourites, including pasta, burgers and traditional puddings. The restaurant group subsequently expanded beyond Bradford, reflecting the blending of British and Pakistani food cultures.

Specialist bakeries have also helped preserve South Asian culinary traditions across generations. Nafees Bakers, which traces its origins to Mirpur in 1979 and operates a British network based in Bradford, specialises in traditional South Asian sweets (mithai), rusks, cakes and savouries. Its expansion across Britain reflects continuing culinary connections between British Pakistani communities and their regions of family origin.

A branch of Bradford-founded restaurant chain Mr T's on London Road, Sheffield, photographed in 2025.

More recent food brands have expanded into halal versions of contemporary British fast food. Mr T's, a Bradford-based restaurant chain, developed a network serving burgers, pizzas, parmos and milkshakes, with branches in Yorkshire, Greater Manchester and Birmingham. The chain announced its first Scottish restaurant in Glasgow in July 2026.

The development of South Asian tea and café chains has also influenced British high-street culture. Leicester-founded Chaiiwala, established in 2015, expanded through a network of cafés specialising in karak chai, South Asian street food and snacks. The chain has extended beyond traditional high-street locations into shopping centres, airports and drive-through premises. The wider growth of dessert parlours and late-opening cafés has provided informal social spaces, including venues that do not serve alcohol.

Dessert parlours have become a feature of Britain's contemporary high streets, including commercial districts with substantial South Asian and Muslim populations. Creams Cafe, founded in 2008 by Adam Mani and Balal Aqil, opened its first dessert café in Southall in 2011 and subsequently expanded through franchising. By August 2026, it operated 92 UK locations, serving gelato, waffles, crêpes, milkshakes and other desserts.

Heavenly Desserts was founded in Birmingham in 2008 by Nizam Mohamed and expanded from its early company-operated restaurants through franchising. By August 2026, the chain had 61 UK locations and a restaurant in Canada. Its menu includes milk cakes, cookie dough, sundaes and croffles, reflecting the wider diversification of dessert café offerings.

Shake Street, a drive-in-style dessert takeaway on Great Horton Road, Bradford, photographed in 2026.

Smaller dessert businesses also operate in established British Pakistani commercial districts. In Bradford, Shake House has branches on Carlisle Road in Manningham and Leeds Road, while Shake Street operates on Great Horton Road. These businesses offer milkshakes and other desserts in takeaway and casual-dining settings.

Bradford's Leeds Road has developed into an established evening dining destination, containing restaurants, sweet shops, takeaways, chai cafés and dessert parlours serving South Asian and other cuisines. Newer food-service developments include EATS92 on Barkerend Road, which provides commercial kitchens for independent food businesses operating through delivery and collection services.

Manchester's Curry Mile on Wilmslow Road at night, photographed in 2024.

Manchester's Curry Mile, centred on Wilmslow Road in Rusholme, has long been associated with Pakistani and wider South Asian restaurants and sweet shops. Its dining culture subsequently diversified to include Middle Eastern restaurants, dessert cafés and other late-night food venues alongside traditional curry houses.

In Birmingham, Ladypool Road and surrounding streets form part of the city's Balti Triangle, historically associated with Pakistani and Kashmiri restaurateurs. Similar South Asian dining districts are found in towns with established British Pakistani communities, including Blackburn, Oldham, Rochdale and Luton.

=== Weddings and banqueting ===
Wedding celebrations form an important part of British Pakistani family and social life. Events may include the Mehndi, Nikah and Walima, with customs varying according to regional, religious and family traditions. The demand for large receptions has supported the development of specialist banqueting venues, particularly in northern England.

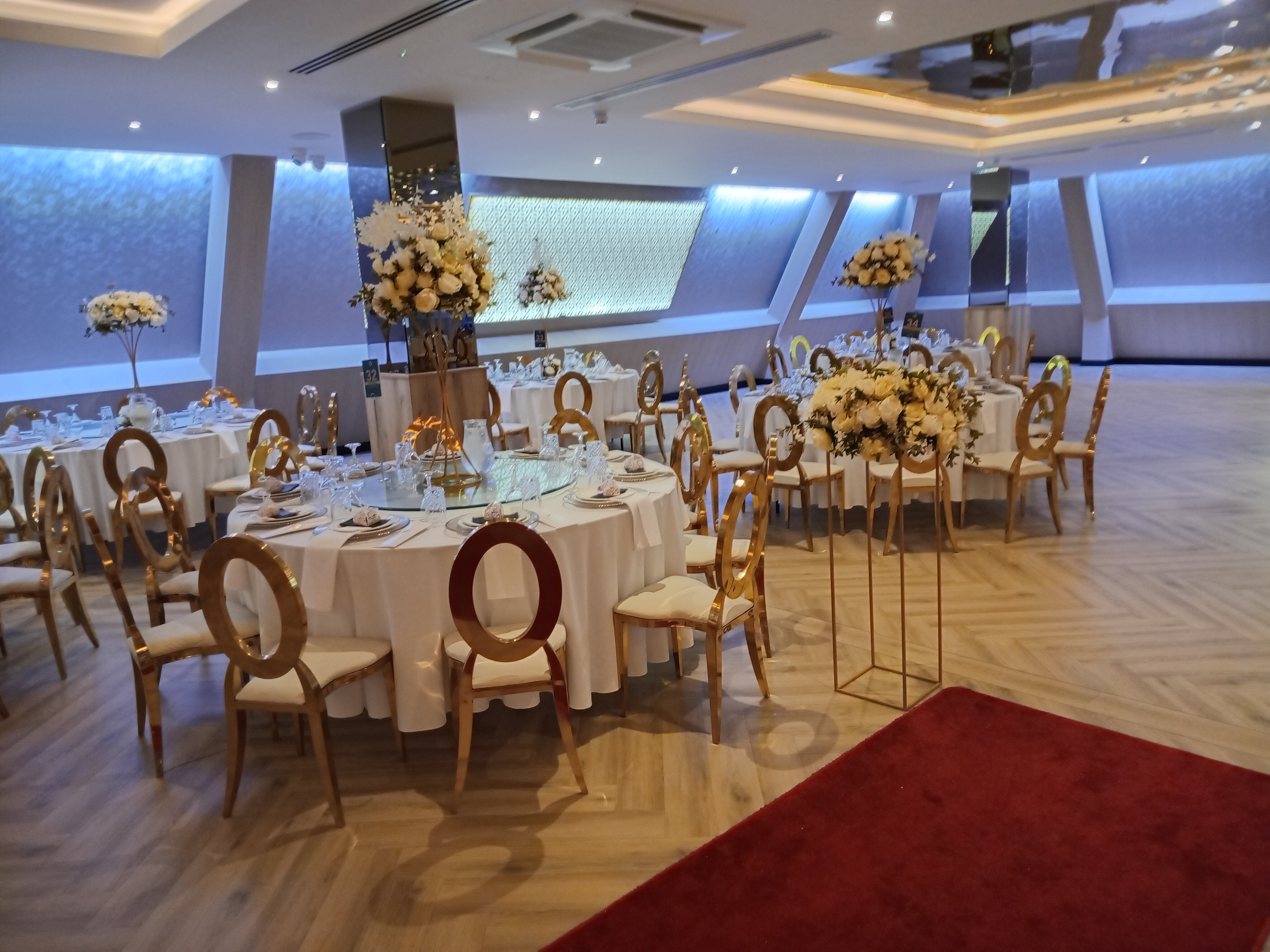
Tables prepared for a wedding reception at Royal Nawaab in Stockport, 2025.

One example is Royal Nawaab, a restaurant and banqueting business founded by Mahboob Hussain. The business developed large-scale dining and event venues, including its former restaurant in Levenshulme, Manchester, and the historic Hoover Building in Perivale, London.

In April 2025, Royal Nawaab opened a restaurant and banqueting complex within the former Co-operative Bank Pyramid in Stockport. The redevelopment converted the previously vacant office building into a restaurant and event venue with capacity for approximately 1,500 guests across three floors. The venue hosts weddings, religious celebrations and other gatherings. In May 2026, Channel 4 broadcast the documentary World's Biggest Curry Restaurant, which examined the venue's kitchens, dining operations and events business.

In West Yorkshire, the Grand Banqueting Suite in Dewsbury became a venue for large South Asian wedding receptions during the 2010s. The family-run business, associated with proprietor Ashiq Hussain, was reported as accommodating up to 1,400 guests, with facilities for wedding ceremonies and celebrations.

Other large South Asian wedding and event venues operate across Greater Manchester, West Yorkshire and Lancashire, including the Eastern Pavilion in Oldham, Nawaab Banqueting Suites in Blackburn and the Imperial Banqueting Suite in Preston. Such facilities accommodate weddings, religious ceremonies and other community gatherings.

=== Community institutions and recreation ===
British Pakistani communities have established religious, educational, sporting and recreational facilities alongside commercial developments. These include mosque complexes, community centres, sports venues and institutions combining religious education with wider social activities.

In Bradford, the Islamic educational charity Greensville Trust acquired the University of Bradford's former School of Management estate at Heaton Mount and Emm Lane in 2021. The 14-acre site contains several Grade II-listed Victorian buildings and was subsequently named Mustafa Mount. The estate has been developed for religious education, worship and community activities, including the Rawdah Mosque and Madrasah.

Multipurpose leisure venues have also emerged, combining organised sport with informal recreation and social activities. Frame 2 Complex on Feather Road in Bradford provides facilities including football, snooker, pool, gaming areas, private leisure rooms and food services. The complex operates as a recreational and social venue alongside hosting organised sporting events.

Frame 2 Complex has also hosted regional tapeball cricket competitions organised by the Yorkshire Cricket Foundation. In March 2026, the venue hosted an overnight Ramadan tournament involving twelve teams from across the region, with matches scheduled between evening prayers and the pre-dawn meal.

Women's access to culturally appropriate recreational facilities has also received attention. Research involving British Pakistani women in Bradford has identified cultural and practical barriers to participation in physical activity, including the availability of suitable exercise facilities. Women's-only fitness facilities in the city include PW Gyms on Barkerend Road, for which a change-of-use planning application was submitted in 2026.

=== Motoring and automotive culture ===
Car ownership and vehicle modification have been studied as aspects of identity, leisure and social participation among British Pakistani communities. Research by University of Bradford sociologist Yunis Alam examined the cultural significance of cars among British Pakistani Muslim men, including their relationship with personal identity, social class and belonging. His research documented the role of vehicle customisation and motoring in expressions of individual and collective identity.

Bradford has developed a vehicle-customisation scene involving specialist businesses and organised car clubs. The Bradford Modified Car Club has hosted events bringing together enthusiasts from different ethnic and social backgrounds. A 2022 investigation by Hyphen described the significance of modified cars among British South Asian communities and the use of car meets as spaces for creative expression and social interaction.

Automotive designer Afzal Kahn founded Kahn Design in Bradford in 1998, developing bespoke vehicle styling, coachbuilding and luxury vehicle modifications. Naveed Barugzai Khan established Enkahnz, another Bradford-based customisation business specialising in bodywork and bespoke automotive design. The latter has also been involved in vocational training and mentoring initiatives for young people.

Prestige and chauffeur-driven vehicles also feature in South Asian wedding celebrations. Specialist companies include Oasis Limousines in Bradford and Platinum Executive Travel in Birmingham, the latter associated with entrepreneur and social-media personality Aleem Iqbal, known as Lord Aleem. These businesses provide luxury and high-performance vehicles for weddings and other occasions.

=== Cuisine ===
British Pakistani food traditions draw on the regional cuisines of Pakistan, including Punjabi, Kashmiri and Pashtun cooking. Common dishes include biryani, nihari, karahi, seekh kebabs and chapli kebabs, alongside foods adapted to British tastes.

The Birmingham balti is an example of Pakistani culinary influence on British cuisine. Developed during the 1970s and associated with Pakistani and Kashmiri restaurateurs in Birmingham, the dish is prepared and served in a thin steel bowl. It became closely associated with the city's Balti Triangle in Sparkbrook, Sparkhill and Balsall Heath. An application for the Birmingham balti to receive European Traditional Speciality Guaranteed status was submitted in 2013.

Another dish associated with the development of South Asian cuisine in Britain is chicken tikka masala, whose origins remain disputed. One widely reported account attributes its creation to Pakistani-born restaurateur Ali Ahmed Aslam, who claimed to have developed the dish at his Shish Mahal restaurant in Glasgow during the 1970s by adding a creamy tomato-based sauce to chicken tikka. Alternative accounts of its origin have also been proposed.

=== Sports ===
==== Cricket ====
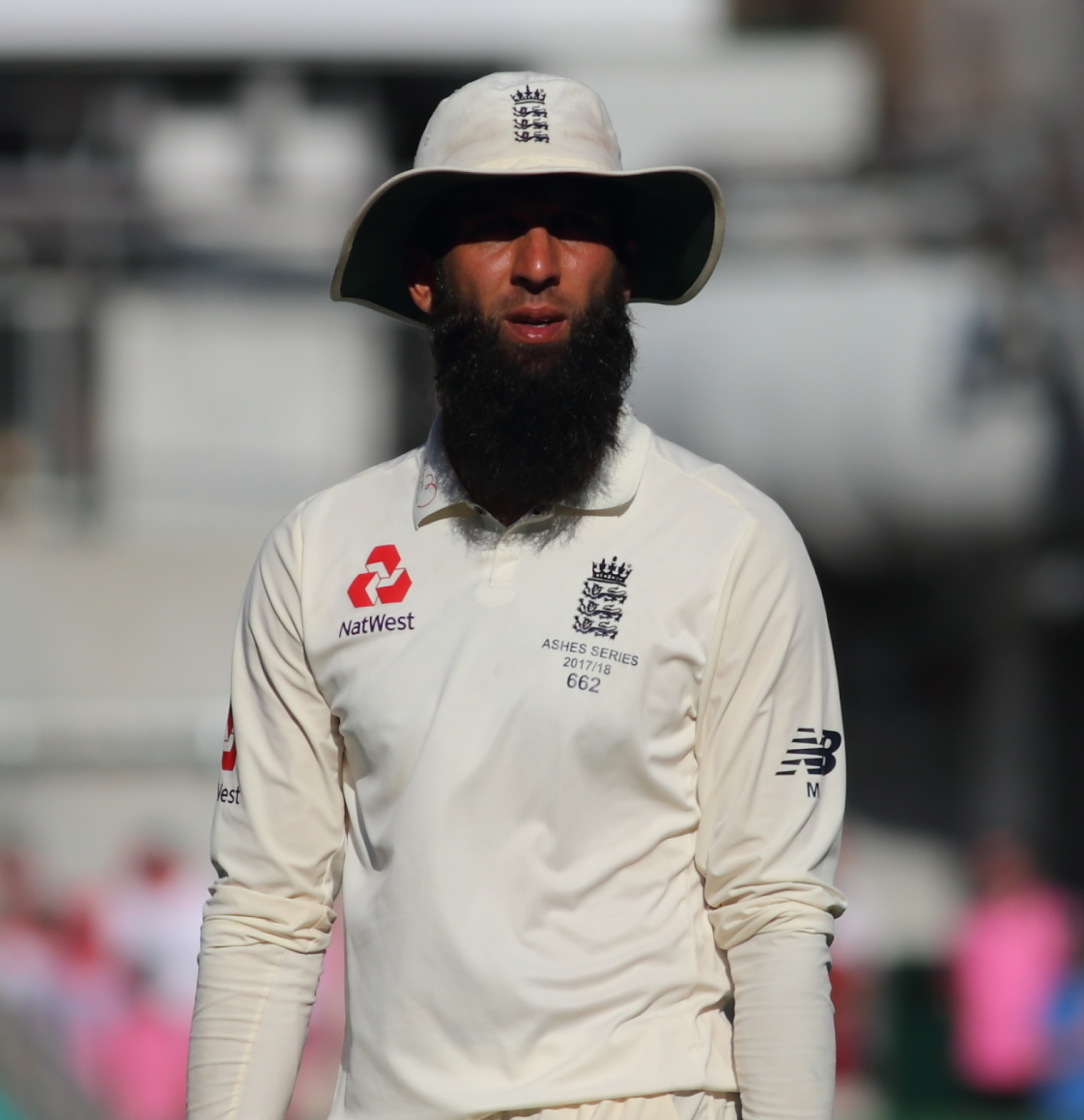
Moeen Ali in 2018

The expansion of the British Empire led to cricket being played overseas. Aftab Habib, Usman Afzaal, Kabir Ali, Owais Shah, Sajid Mahmood, Adil Rashid, Amjad Khan, Ajmal Shahzad, Moeen Ali, Zafar Ansari, Saqib Mahmood, Rehan Ahmed and Shoaib Bashir are Pakistani-origin sportspeople who have played cricket for England. Similarly, Asim Butt, Omer Hussain, Majid Haq, Qasim Sheikh and Moneeb Iqbal have represented Scotland. Imad Wasim became the first Welsh-born cricketer to represent Pakistan. A number of former Pakistani cricketers have pursued professional cricket in England, and in the course of doing so, attained British citizenship or residency; they include Azhar Mahmood, Mohammad Akram, Mushtaq Ahmed, Saqlain Mushtaq, Junaid Khan, Zafar Gohar, and Mohammad Amir. There are several other British Pakistanis, as well as cricketers from Pakistan, who play English county cricket.

Many young British Pakistanis find it difficult to make their way to the highest level of playing for England, despite much talent around the country. Many concerns about this have been documented although the number of British Pakistanis making progress in representing England is on the rise.

The Pakistan national cricket team enjoys a substantial following among British Pakistanis, with the level of support translating to the equivalent of a home advantage whenever the team tours the UK. The "Stani Army" is a group consisting of British Pakistanis who follow the team, especially when they play in the UK. The Stani Army is seen as the "rival" fan club to India's "Bharat Army". England and Pakistan share a long cricketing relationship, often characterised by rivalries.

==== Football ====
Football is also widely followed and played by many young British Pakistanis. Masood Fakhri was the first player from South Asia to play in England, where he played for Bradford City before retiring. Many players on the Pakistan national football team are British-born Pakistanis who became eligible to represent the country because of their Pakistani heritage. Jimmy Khan became the first overseas player to be called up to play for the Pakistan national football team in 1989. Zesh Rehman played briefly for Fulham, becoming the first British Asian to play in the Premier League, before also playing for the English youth national teams until eventually opting for Pakistan. Easah Suliman became the first player of Asian heritage to captain an England football side, having done so at Under-16, Under-17 and Under-19 levels, until eventually opting for Pakistan at senior level. Suliman played every game at centre back in the England Under-19s victorious UEFA European Under-19 Championship campaign in July 2017, scoring the opening goal in England's 2–1 final victory over Portugal.

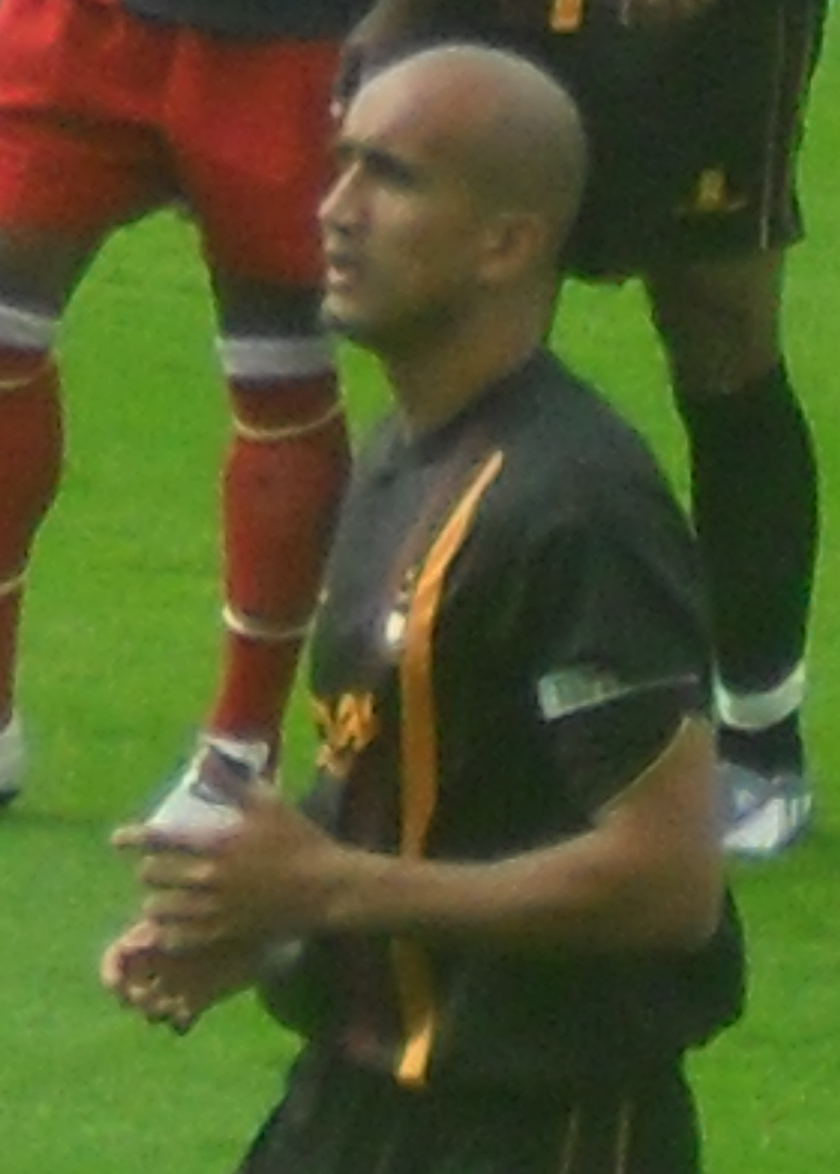
Zesh Rehman playing for Bradford City in 2009

Zidane Iqbal made his first-team debut for Manchester United on 8 December 2021 as an 89th-minute substitute in a Champions League match against Young Boys. Thus, he became the first British-born South Asian to play for the senior club, and the first ever British South Asian to play in the Champions League.

Other notable British Pakistani footballers include Adil Nabi, Otis Khan, Adnan Ahmed and Harun Hamid.

==== Boxing ====
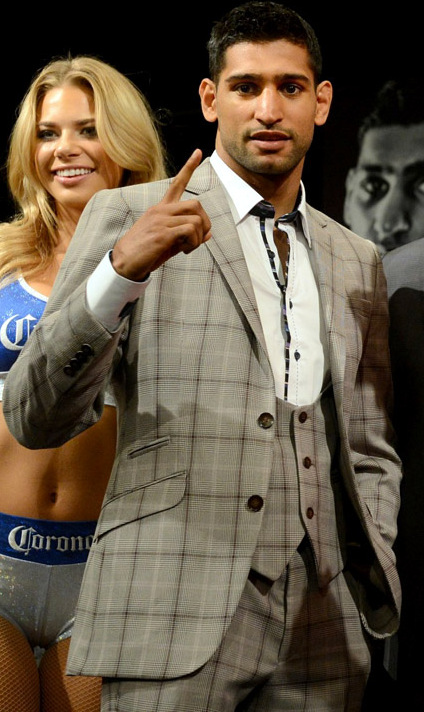
Amir Khan in 2014

Boxing is commonly practised among British Pakistanis. Amir Khan is regarded as one of the most successful British boxers of all time, and is credited with popularising boxing amongst British Pakistanis, as well as inspiring South Asian involvement in all aspects of British boxing.

Usman Ahmed, Jawaid Khaliq, Kash Farooq, Adam Azim, Hamzah Sheeraz and Shabaz Masoud are other notable British Pakistani boxers.

==== Other sports ====
Hockey and polo are commonly played in Pakistan, with the former being a national sport, but these sports are not as popular among British Pakistanis, possibly because of the urban lifestyles which the majority of them embrace. Imran Sherwani was a hockey player of Pakistani descent who played for the English and Great Britain national field hockey teams.

Adam Khan is a race car driver from Bridlington, Yorkshire. He represents Pakistan in the A1 Grand Prix series. Khan is currently the demonstration driver for the Renault F1 racing team. Ikram Butt was the first South Asian to play international rugby for England in 1995. He is the founder of the British Asian Rugby Association and the British Pakistani rugby league team, and has also captained Pakistan. He is the current WBA World light welterweight champion and 2004 Summer Olympics silver medalist. Matthew Syed was a table tennis international, and the English number one for many years. Lianna Swan is a swimmer who has represented Pakistan in several events.

=== Literature ===
A number of British Pakistani writers are notable in the field of literature. They include Tariq Ali, Kamila Shamsie, Nadeem Aslam, Mohsin Hamid and others.

Through their publications, diaspora writers have developed a body of work that has come to be known as Pakistani English literature.

== Ethnicity and cultural assimilation ==
A report of a study conducted by The University of Essex found British Pakistanis identify with 'Britishness' more than any other Britons. The study is one of several recent studies that have found that Pakistanis in Britain express a strong sense of belonging in Britain. The report showed that 90% of Pakistanis feel a strong sense of belonging in Britain compared to 84% of white Britons.

English Pakistanis tend to identify much more with the United Kingdom than with England, with 63% describing themselves in a Policy Exchange survey as exclusively "British" and not "English" in terms of nationality, and only 15% saying they were solely English.

=== Azad Kashmiris ===
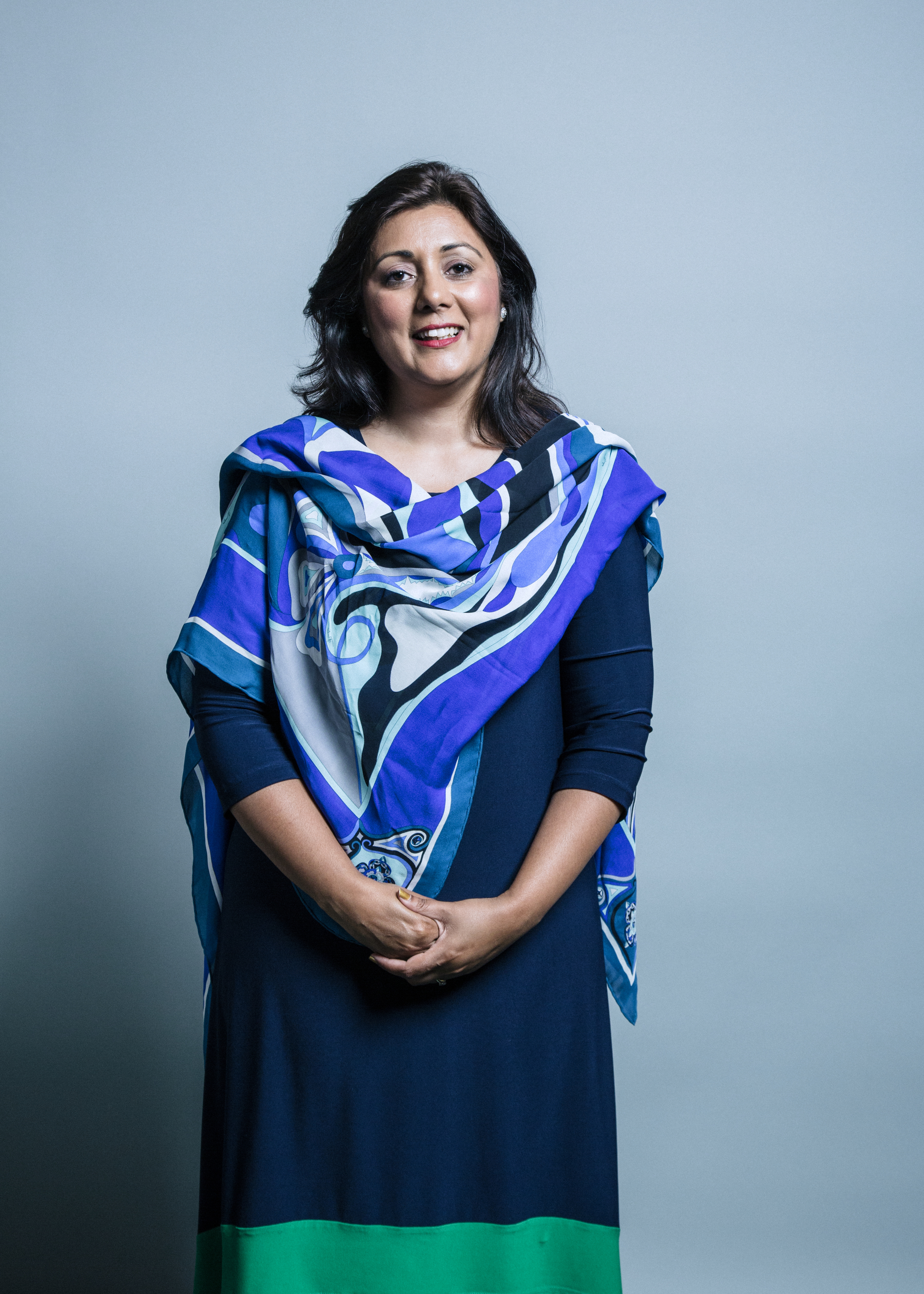
Nus Ghani is a Kashmir born MP and the first female Pakistani Conservative Party MP.

Around 70% of all British Pakistanis trace their origins to the administrative territory of Azad Kashmir in northeastern Pakistan, mainly from the Mirpur, Kotli and Bhimber districts.

Christopher Snedden writes that most of the native residents of Azad Kashmir are not of Kashmiri ethnicity; rather, they could be called "Jammuites" due to their historical and cultural links with that region, which is coterminous with neighbouring Punjab and Hazara. Because their region was formerly a part of the princely state of Jammu and Kashmir and is named after it, many Azad Kashmiris have adopted the "Kashmiri" identity, whereas in an ethnolinguistic context, the term "Kashmiri" would ordinarily refer to natives of the Kashmir Valley region. The population of Azad Kashmir has strong historical, cultural and linguistic affinities with the neighbouring populations of upper Punjab and Potohar region of Pakistan.

The first generation migrant from Azad Kashmir were not highly educated, and being from rural settlements, had little or no experience of urban living in Pakistan. Migration from Jammu and Kashmir began soon after the Second World War as the majority of the male population of this area and the Potohar region worked in the British armed forces, as well as to fill labour shortages in industry. But the mass migration phenomenon accelerated in the 1960s, when, to improve the supply of water, the Mangla Dam project was built in the area, flooding the surrounding farmlands. Up to 50,000 people from Mirpur (5% of the displaced) resettled in Britain. More Azad Kashmiris joined their relatives in Britain after benefiting from government compensation and liberal migration policies. Large Azad Kashmiri communities can be found in Birmingham, Bradford, Manchester, Leeds, Luton and the surrounding towns.

The Azad Kashmiri expatriate community has made notable progress in UK politics and a sizeable number of MPs, councillors, lord mayors and deputy mayors are representing the community in different constituencies.

=== Punjabis ===
Punjabis make up the second-largest sub-group of British Pakistanis, estimated to make up to a third of all British Pakistanis. With an equally large number from Indian Punjab, two-thirds of all British Asians are of Punjabi descent, and they are the largest Punjabi community outside of South Asia, resulting in Punjabi being the third-most commonly spoken language in the UK.

People who came from the Punjab area integrated much more easily into the British society as early Punjabi immigrants to Britain tended to have higher education credentials and found it easier to assimilate because many already had a basic knowledge of the English language (primarily Pakistani English). Research by Teesside University has found the British Punjabi community of late has become one of the most highly educated and economically successful ethnic minorities in the UK.

Most Pakistani Punjabis living in the UK trace their roots to villages of the Pothohar region (Jhelum, Gujar Khan, Attock ) of northern Punjab, along with villages in the Central Punjab (Faisalabad, Sahiwal, Jhang, Gujrat, and Sargodha) region, while more recent immigrants have also arrived from large cities such as Lahore and Multan. British Punjabis are commonly found in the south of England, the Midlands, and the major cities in the north (with smaller minorities in former mill towns in Lancashire and Yorkshire).

=== Pashtuns ===
Pakistani Pashtuns in the United Kingdom mainly originate from the provinces of Khyber Pakhtunkhwa and northern Balochistan in Pakistan, though there are also smaller communities from other parts of Pakistan, such as Pashtuns of Punjab from Attock. There are several estimates of the Pashtun population in the UK. Ethnologue estimates that there are up to 87,000 native Pashto-speakers in the UK; this figure also includes Afghan immigrants belonging to the Pashtun ethnicity. Another report shows that there are over 100,000 Pashtuns in Britain, making them the largest Pashtun community in Europe.

Major Pashtun settlement in the United Kingdom can be dated over the course of the past five decades. There is a British Pashtun Council which has been formed by the Pashtun community in the UK.

British Pashtuns have continued to maintain ties with Pakistan over the years, taking keen interest in political and socioeconomic developments in Pakistan.

=== Sindhis ===
There are over 30,000 Sindhis in Britain.

=== Baloch ===
There is a small Baloch community in the UK, originating from the Balochistan province of southwestern Pakistan and neighbouring regions. There are many Baloch associations and groups active in the UK, including the Baloch Students and Youth Association (BSYA), Baloch Cultural Society, Baloch Human Rights Council (UK) and others.

Some Baloch political leaders and workers are based in the UK, where they found exile.

=== Muhajirs ===
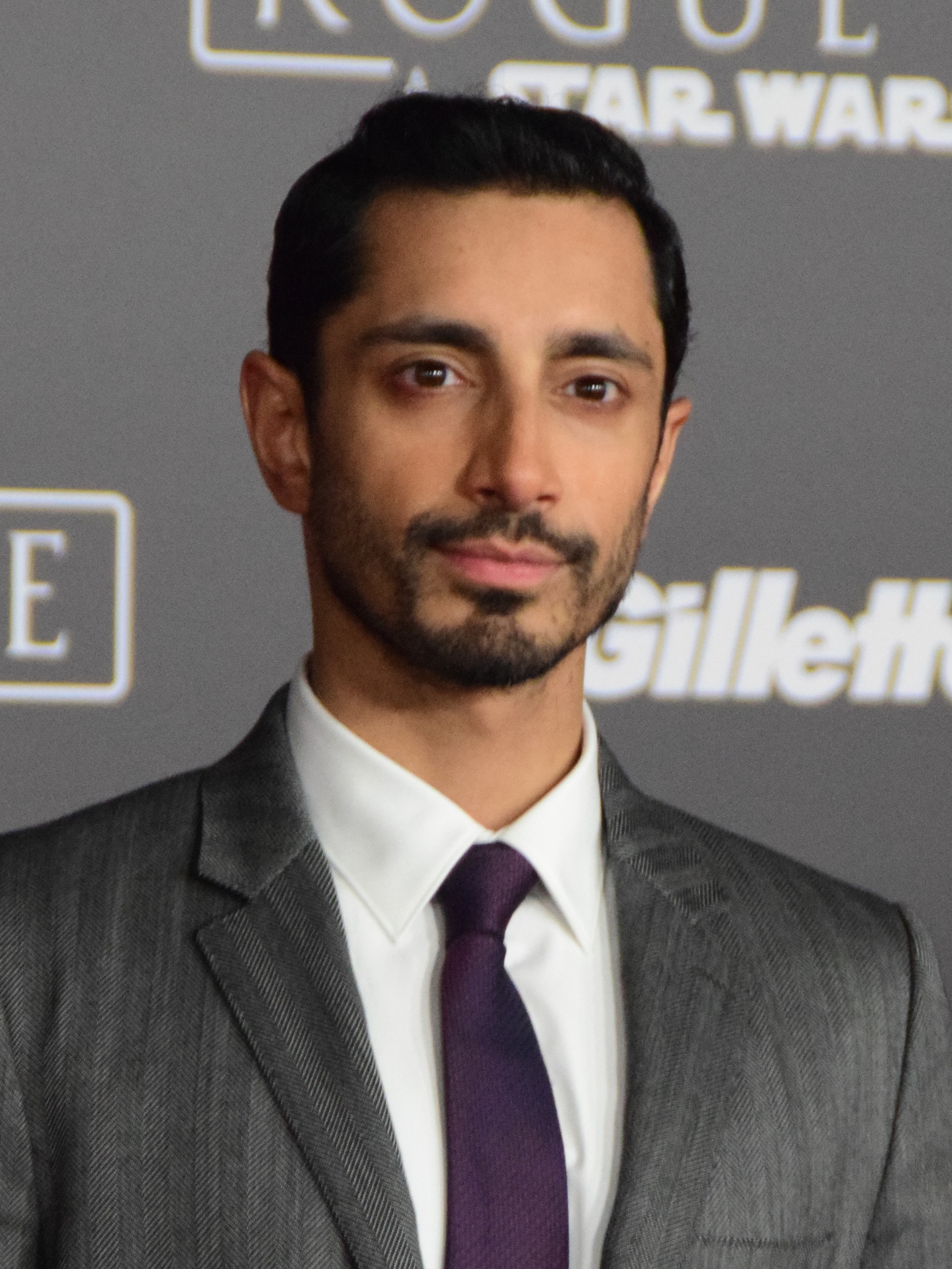
Riz Ahmed is a British Pakistani actor and rapper of Muhajir origin

There is also a significant albeit smaller community Muhajirs in the UK. Muhajirs originally migrated from present-day India to Pakistan following the partition of British India in 1947. Most of them settled in Pakistan's largest city Karachi, where they form the demographic majority. Many Muhajir Pakistanis later migrated to Britain, effecting a secondary migration.

Altaf Hussain, leader of the Muttahida Qaumi Movement (MQM)—the largest political party in Karachi, with its roots lying in the Muhajir community—has been based in England in self-imposed exile since 1992. He is controversially regarded to have virtually "ruled" and "remotely governed" Karachi from his residence in the north London suburb of Edgware. Another notable includes the 2016 Mayor of London Sadiq Khan, who is of Muhajir origin.

=== Others ===
There is also a Pakistani Hazara community in the UK, concentrated particularly in Milton Keynes, northeastern London, Southampton and Birmingham. They migrated to the UK from Quetta and its surroundings, which is historically home to the large Hazara population in Pakistan.

== Health and social issues ==
British Pakistanis show distinctive health patterns compared with the general UK population, reflecting demographic structure, socioeconomic conditions, and South Asian–associated disease risk profiles. Large UK cohort, registry, and genomic studies conducted since the 2010s have expanded the evidence base on health outcomes in this population.

=== Major recent population health research ===
Several large UK research programmes include substantial British Pakistani participation. Genes & Health is a community-based genomic and health study of British Pakistani and Bangladeshi heritage populations, with over 100,000 volunteers whose genetic data are linked to NHS health records. Publications from the programme report elevated levels of autozygosity and identify recessive genetic contributions to both rare disorders and common diseases, with implications for diabetes, cardiovascular disease, and inherited conditions.

The Born in Bradford longitudinal cohort studies have followed tens of thousands of children and families and have produced widely cited research on congenital anomalies, child health, diabetes risk, and changing marriage patterns among Pakistani-heritage families. Cohort analyses report measurable declines in parental cousin marriage across successive birth cohorts and identify both genetic and socioeconomic factors associated with health outcomes.

=== Chronic disease patterns ===
Health Survey for England ethnicity analyses report that people of Pakistani ethnicity have among the highest prevalence of diagnosed type 2 diabetes in England after age standardisation. Studies also report earlier average age of onset compared with the White British population.

Medical literature attributes elevated diabetes risk in South Asian populations to a combination of genetic susceptibility, adiposity patterns, and early-life influences. Reviews describe developmental origins mechanisms — sometimes termed the “thrifty phenotype” hypothesis — in which fetal and early-childhood undernutrition is associated with higher later-life metabolic disease risk.

Large cardiovascular datasets in England report higher coronary heart disease diagnosis rates and earlier onset among Pakistani and other South Asian groups compared with the White British population.

=== Cancer patterns and screening ===
Cancer incidence varies by ethnicity and age structure. Because the British Pakistani population is younger on average than the White British population, crude overall cancer incidence rates are lower. Registry-based studies of South Asian populations in England report lower rates of several smoking-related cancers and differing patterns in some gastrointestinal and liver cancers.

Screening programme data have reported lower participation in some cancer screening programmes — including breast, cervical, and bowel screening — among certain South Asian groups, including Pakistani communities, with disparities associated with language, access, and deprivation. NHS programmes have introduced targeted outreach approaches to improve uptake.

=== Disability and special educational needs ===
UK disability prevalence increases substantially with age. Because the British Pakistani population has a younger age distribution than the White British population, direct comparison of crude all-age disability rates is affected by demographic structure.

UK child cohort and education-linked studies report that Pakistani-heritage children are not consistently overrepresented in special educational needs and disability (SEND/SEN) categories after adjustment for socioeconomic factors. Some cohort analyses report similar or lower recorded rates compared with White British children in the same study populations.

=== Consanguineous Marriage and Genetic Risk ===
Consanguineous marriage (marriage between biological relatives, most commonly first cousins) occurs in parts of the British Pakistani community, with substantial regional variation. Settlement studies show that Pakistani populations are geographically concentrated, and patterns observed in specific cities are not necessarily representative nationally.

Bradford cohort research reports declining prevalence of first-cousin parentage across successive birth cohorts, with unrelated parents forming a growing majority in more recent cohorts. Qualitative studies in the same population describe changing attitudes among younger and UK-born participants regarding marriage within kinship networks.

Medical cohort studies report that first-cousin parentage is associated with increased relative risk of autosomal recessive disorders and congenital anomalies, while also noting that absolute risk remains low and is modified by factors such as maternal education and access to healthcare.

=== Sexual health and STIs ===
UK sexual health surveillance reports that diagnosed sexually transmitted infection (STI) rates vary primarily by age, deprivation, and behavioural factors. National surveillance summaries generally report lower recorded STI diagnosis rates among South Asian ethnic groups, including Pakistani populations, compared with the White British population, while cautioning that testing patterns and healthcare access influence recorded rates.

== Education ==
Data from the 2021 Census shows that 33% of British Pakistanis in England and Wales hold degree level qualifications, compared to 31% of White British people. This has increased since 1991, when the figures for both groups holding a degree were 7% and 13%, respectively.

25% of British Pakistanis in England and Wales did not have qualifications, compared to 18% of White British people, making them of one of the least qualified major groups.

=== Secondary education ===
According to the Department for Education, Pakistani pupils in England performed above both the national average and White British pupils at GCSE level in 2025/26.

Their average Attainment 8 score was 46.8, compared with 46.2 nationally and 44.4 among White British pupils. Some 47.1% achieved grade 5 or above in both English and mathematics, compared with 46.3% nationally and 43.3% among White British pupils.

Among pupils eligible for free school meals, 39.2% of Pakistani pupils achieved this threshold, compared with 20.1% of White British pupils.

GCSE attainment in England (2025/26, provisional)
Ethnic group	Attainment 8	Grade 5+ in English and maths
Chinese	66.4	80.3%
Indian	59.6	70.8%
Mixed White and Asian	52.3	58.0%
Bangladeshi	51.8	57.8%
White Irish	50.6	54.6%
Black African	48.3	49.1%
Mixed (all)	47.2	47.7%
Pakistani	46.8	47.1%
National average	46.2	46.3%
White British	44.4	43.3%
Black Caribbean	39.1	30.4%
Mixed White and Black Caribbean	38.9	32.1%
Irish Traveller	29.7	22.1%
Gypsy	20.5	8.0%

At A-level in 2024/25, Pakistani students performed below both national and White British averages, achieving 32.2 points per entry, compared with 36.1 nationally and 35.3 among White British students.

Some 10.8% achieved at least three A*–A grades, compared with 17.5% nationally and 14.7% among White British students.

However, in Level 3 Applied General vocational qualifications, Pakistani students achieved an average of 30.4 points per entry, slightly above the national (30.0) and White British (30.2) averages.

Average points per A-level entry in England (2024/25, revised)
Ethnic group	Average points
National average (all institutions)	36.1
White British	35.3
Mixed (all)	35.2
Asian (all)	35.1
National average (state-funded)	35.0
Other ethnic groups (all)	34.2
Pakistani	32.2
Black (all)	31.9

In 2024/25, mathematics, chemistry and biology were the most frequently entered A-level subjects among Pakistani students, followed by psychology. Science, technology, engineering, and mathematics (STEM) subjects accounted for 48.6% of Pakistani A-level entries, compared with 29.9% of White British entries. However, 19.4% of Pakistani entries received A*–A grades, compared with 25.8% of White British entries.

In vocational qualifications, the most popular subject areas among Pakistani students were business, finance and law, science and mathematics, health and care, sociology and social policy, and information technology.

Department for Education destination measures for students completing 16–19 study in 2023/24 showed that 56.7% of Pakistani students continued in sustained education during 2024/25, compared with 43.4% nationally and 36.2% of White British students.

This included 49.5% entering UK higher education and 5.8% continuing in further education (FE), compared with national rates of 37.1% and 5.4% respectively. Of Pakistani students, 3.5% continued on Level 3 FE courses, 1.6% on Level 2 courses and 0.2% at sixth-form colleges. In contrast, 4.1% entered sustained apprenticeships, compared with 7.0% nationally and 9.1% of White British students; these included advanced (Level 3, 2.1%) and higher or degree apprenticeships (Level 4+, 1.0%).

Overall, 74.7% of Pakistani students sustained an education, employment or apprenticeship destination, compared with 77.5% nationally.

Destinations of 2023/24 study leavers in England (2024/25)
Sustained destination	Pakistani	White British	National average
UK higher education	49.5%	31.1%	37.1%
Further education	5.8%	4.4%	5.4%
Any education	56.7%	36.2%	43.4%
Apprenticeships	4.1%	9.1%	7.0%
Employment	13.8%	33.2%	27.2%
Any sustained destination	74.7%	78.4%	77.5%

Destinations cover students completing 16–19 study at state-funded mainstream schools and colleges, across all qualification levels. Sustained participation generally requires approximately six months of education, apprenticeship or employment activity.

In 2023, British Pakistani student Mahnoor Cheema was reported to have set an academic record after passing 34 GCSE subjects at the age of 16. In 2025, she completed 24 A-level subjects, achieving 19 A* or A grades, and secured a place to study medicine at the University of Oxford. Several Muslim faith schools also cater to British Pakistani pupils.

=== Higher education ===
There are 97,000 UK-domiciled British Pakistani students in the 2024–25 academic year, this represents 4.5% of all UK-domiciled students. In 2017, approximately 16,480 British Pakistani students were admitted to university, almost a two-fold increase from 8,460 in 2006.

In 2021, 58.4% of British Pakistanis chose to continue their studies at the university level. This was a higher rate than average nationally (44%), and higher than the rate for White British (39%).

Science and mathematics are the most popular subjects at A-Level and degree level among the youngest generation of British Pakistanis, as they begin to establish themselves within the field.

In addition, there are over 10,000 Pakistani international students who enrol and study at British universities and educational institutions each year. There are numerous student and cultural associations formed by Pakistani pupils studying at British universities.

=== Language education ===
Urdu courses are available in the UK and can be studied at GCSE and A-Level. Urdu degrees are offered by several British universities and institutes, while several others are also hoping to offer courses in Urdu, open to established speakers as well as beginners, in the future.

The Punjabi language is also offered at GCSE and A-Level, and taught as a course by two universities: SOAS, University of London (SOAS) and King's College London. Pashto is presently taught at SOAS and King's College London as well.

== Economics ==
British Pakistanis participate in the British economy through employment, self-employment, business ownership and professional occupations. Economic outcomes vary by age, gender, educational attainment and country of birth.

Official statistics show lower overall employment and higher economic inactivity than the national average, alongside substantial representation in healthcare, transport, retail, professional services and entrepreneurship.

=== Employment and economic activity ===
According to the Office for National Statistics (ONS) Labour Force Survey, approximately 62% of working-age Pakistanis were employed between April and June 2026, compared with 75% of the United Kingdom's working-age population. Employment rates were approximately 75% among Pakistani men and 48% among Pakistani women.

Pakistani labour market indicators, United Kingdom, April–June 2026
Indicator	Pakistani	UK overall
Employment rate (ages 16–64)	62%	75%
Unemployment rate (ages 16 and over)	8%	5%
Economic inactivity rate (ages 16–64)	33%	21%

Source: ONS Labour Force Survey. Percentages are rounded to whole numbers and are not seasonally adjusted.

Employment patterns differ substantially by sex and country of birth. Analysis of the 2021 Census for England and Wales found that 59% of UK-born Pakistani men aged 16–64 were employed, compared with 74% of foreign-born Pakistani men and 76% of UK-born White British men. Among women, employment rates were 49% for UK-born Pakistanis, 32% for foreign-born Pakistanis and 70% for UK-born White British women.

Employment rates by sex and country of birth, ages 16–64, England and Wales, 2021 Census
Population	Men	Women
UK-born Pakistani	59%	49%
Foreign-born Pakistani	74%	32%
UK-born White British	76%	70%

Source: ONS, 2021 Census custom tabulation. Employment includes employed full-time students. Figures are rounded to whole percentages.

Age composition affects these comparisons. Among Pakistani adults aged 25–49, employment rates were 76% for UK-born men and 82% for foreign-born men, while the corresponding rates for women were 60% and 35%. The smaller difference between men in this age range partly reflects the high proportion of younger adults and students among UK-born Pakistanis.

Higher economic inactivity among Pakistani women partly reflects unpaid childcare, domestic responsibilities and single-earner household arrangements. Research has also identified cultural and religious preferences, childcare costs and barriers to employment as contributing factors. Economic inactivity differs from unemployment because economically inactive people are not actively seeking and available for work.

=== Employment discrimination and pay ===
Research has identified ethnic penalties affecting British Pakistanis in recruitment, employment, earnings and career progression. A 2019 field experiment conducted by researchers at the University of Oxford's Centre for Social Investigation submitted nearly 3,200 fictitious applications to real vacancies, varying applicants' ethnic backgrounds while keeping their qualifications and experience comparable. The study found that applicants of Pakistani origin needed to submit approximately 70% more applications than White British candidates to obtain a positive response from employers.

A subsequent study published in Sociology in 2021 found an association between experimentally measured hiring discrimination and ethnic employment penalties after accounting for demographic and socioeconomic characteristics. The researchers noted that recruitment discrimination contributes to labour-market inequalities, although differences in qualifications, job-search behaviour and social networks also affect employment outcomes.

Research on second-generation British Pakistani women has also identified barriers to professional progression despite increasing educational attainment. A longitudinal study published in 2026 found that higher education improved access to professional occupations, but Pakistani graduate women continued to face comparatively high unemployment and obstacles to promotion. The authors identified workplace exclusion, racial discrimination and the interaction of ethnic, gender and religious identities as contributing factors.

Pay disparities also vary by country of birth. ONS analysis for 2022 estimated an adjusted hourly pay gap of 14% for foreign-born Pakistani employees relative to UK-born White British employees, after accounting for factors including age, occupation, qualifications and geographical location. The corresponding estimate for UK-born Pakistani employees was considered statistically unreliable, preventing a firm conclusion about their adjusted pay gap that year.

=== Occupations and professional representation ===
British Pakistanis work across managerial, professional, technical, service and manual occupations. Analysis of the 2021 Census indicates that approximately 46% of employed UK-born Pakistanis worked in managerial, professional or associate professional and technical occupations. Among those aged 25–49, around half were employed in these occupational groups, broadly comparable with UK-born White British workers in the same age range and higher than the Pakistani population overall.

The 2021 Census also recorded substantial Pakistani representation in transport, security, healthcare and several professional occupations in England and Wales.

Pakistani representation in selected occupations, England and Wales, 2021 Census
Occupation	Pakistani workers	Share of occupation
Elementary security occupations	18,315	7%
Road transport drivers	66,199	7%
Medical practitioners	16,097	7%
Other health professionals	11,925	6%
Legal professionals	7,009	3%
Shopkeepers and sales supervisors	8,220	3%
Retail and wholesale managers	13,469	3%
Finance professionals	11,016	3%
Information technology professionals	14,299	2%

Source: ONS, 2021 Census, RM104. Percentages indicate the Pakistani share of workers within each occupation, rather than the proportion of Pakistani workers employed in that occupation.

Healthcare is an important area of professional representation. According to the General Medical Council (GMC), 37,889 registered doctors (9%) identified as Pakistani by ethnicity in August 2026. Approximately 28,000 doctors on the GMC register had obtained their primary medical qualification in Pakistan, representing 18% of registered international medical graduates (IMGs). Of these, approximately 20,000 held a licence to practise. Pakistan was consequently a major source of internationally trained doctors on the UK medical register.

An Institute for Fiscal Studies study found that doctors of Pakistani ethnicity accounted for 8% of junior doctors, 4% of consultants and 10% of other specialist doctors in the National Health Service (NHS) in England in 2021.

Other healthcare professions also have Pakistani representation. The Nursing and Midwifery Council recorded 7,676 registrants of Pakistani ethnicity in March 2026, comprising 7,242 nurses, 405 midwives and 29 with dual registration. The General Pharmaceutical Council recorded 7,280 pharmacists (11%) and 887 pharmacy technicians (3%) of Pakistani ethnicity in March 2025. Historical General Dental Council figures identified approximately 2,100 registered dentists of Pakistani ethnicity in 2017.

Transport is another significant area of employment. The 2021 Census recorded approximately 66,200 Pakistani road transport drivers in England and Wales, accounting for 7% of workers in that occupation. In London, Transport for London licensing data from May 2026 recorded 13,667 private-hire drivers of Pakistani ethnicity (13%) and 209 licensed taxi drivers (1%). Ethnicity was unrecorded for a substantial proportion of licence holders.

In private security, Security Industry Authority (SIA) data for September 2026 recorded approximately 70,000 active licence holders of Pakistani nationality, representing 16% of all active licence holders. Unlike the 2021 Census and TfL figures, the SIA statistics classify individuals by nationality rather than ethnicity.

=== Public-sector employment ===
British Pakistanis are employed throughout the public sector, including local government, the NHS, education and public administration. Workforce equality reports from councils and NHS trusts provide examples of Pakistani representation, particularly in areas with established Pakistani communities.

Pakistani representation in selected public-sector workforces
Organisation	Pakistani representation	Reporting period
Bradford Council	12% of employees	2017
Birmingham City Council	7% of employees	2023
Slough Borough Council	9% of employees	2024
University Hospitals Birmingham NHS Foundation Trust	2,001 employees (8%)	2025 report
Bradford Teaching Hospitals NHS Foundation Trust	1,482 employees	2025

Figures refer to employees of individual organisations rather than the proportion of Pakistani residents employed in the public sector. Reporting periods, workforce coverage and ethnicity disclosure rates differ between organisations.

The figures illustrate Pakistani participation in public services, although representation varies between organisations and occupational grades. Differences in the demographic composition of local labour markets, recruitment patterns and ethnicity reporting affect comparisons between employers.

=== Self-employment and business ownership ===
Self-employment has historically been significant among British Pakistanis, particularly in transport, retail, hospitality and family-operated businesses. ONS estimates for April–June 2026 recorded approximately 106,000 self-employed people of Pakistani ethnicity, representing around 16% of employed Pakistanis.

A March 2026 ONS publication estimated approximately 16,100 business-ownership instances among people of Pakistani ethnicity in the UK in 2024, with a 95% confidence interval of 9,800–22,400. The experimental measure includes sole company directors, business proprietors and partners, including ownership in second jobs. It does not represent a definitive count of unique business owners or registered companies.

British Pakistani entrepreneurs have established businesses across wholesale distribution, convenience retail, food manufacturing, hospitality, property and professional services. One of the largest is the Bestway Group, founded by Sir Anwar Pervez OBE in 1976. Its operations include Bestway Wholesale, Well Pharmacy, and the convenience retail brands best-one, Costcutter and Bargain Booze. The company has expanded internationally under executives including Lord Choudrey CBE, with interests in banking and cement production in Pakistan. The group reported worldwide turnover of approximately £5.2 billion and profit before tax of £750 million for the financial year ending June 2025.

British Pakistani-founded restaurant businesses have also developed into regional and national chains. Shabir Hussain established Akbar's in Bradford in 1995, subsequently expanding to cities including Manchester, Birmingham, Newcastle and Glasgow. The business became known for its large naan breads and received several restaurant industry awards.

Other Bradford-based enterprises include Aagrah, founded by Mohammed Sabir MBE in 1977, and the Mumtaz Group, which developed from a food business established by Farzana Begum in the late 1970s and subsequently expanded by her son Mumtaz Khan Akbar. The Mumtaz business expanded into restaurants and food manufacturing, including halal baby food.

Bradford-based Regal Food Products Group, founded by Mohammed Younis Chaudhry MBE, expanded into bakery products, food manufacturing and supermarket distribution. Chaudhry was appointed an MBE in the 2025 New Year Honours for services to business and the community in Bradford.

Other restaurant and food-service businesses include the Bradford-founded MyLahore chain and halal fast-food franchises such as Dixy Chicken and Chicken Cottage, which developed networks of outlets in Britain and overseas. The Glasgow-based Sarwar family's Hero Brands acquired German Doner Kebab and contributed to its expansion across the UK and internationally before selling a majority stake to private equity investor True Capital in 2025.

Smaller British Pakistani businesses include independent grocers, clothing and jewellery retailers, wholesalers, takeaway operators, construction firms and professional practices. Such enterprises form part of established commercial districts in Bradford, Birmingham, Manchester, Luton, Oldham, Rochdale, Bolton, Blackburn and other areas with substantial Pakistani populations.

=== Household income, poverty and state support ===
The Department for Work and Pensions' Family Resources Survey for 2024–25 reported that approximately 64% of gross household income among Pakistani-headed households came from wages and salaries, with a further 11% from self-employment, based on three-year averaged data. Other sources included pensions, state support and investments.

The Joseph Rowntree Foundation reported in January 2026 that approximately 48% of people in Pakistani households lived in relative poverty after housing costs, compared with 18% of people in White-headed households. The foundation also documented a substantial long-term decline in Pakistani poverty rates, although significant disparities remained.

Household size, lower second-earner participation and comparatively high economic inactivity among women contribute to differences in measured household incomes. In some Pakistani families, one parent undertakes unpaid childcare and domestic responsibilities while the other is in paid employment. Income-based poverty measures adjust for household composition but do not directly measure accumulated assets or unpaid domestic labour. Irregular earnings from self-employment can also be difficult to measure accurately.

Receipt of state support varies by household composition and benefit type. Pakistani families are comparatively likely to receive Child Benefit, reflecting their younger age structure, while State Pension receipt is less common. Benefits may also be received alongside earnings from employment or self-employment.

=== Housing, household wealth and savings ===
Home ownership is common among British Pakistani households, with approximately 60% living in owner-occupied accommodation, including homes owned outright or purchased with a mortgage. Estimates vary by survey, reporting year and whether households or individuals are measured.

The ONS Wealth and Assets Survey for April 2016 to March 2018 found that Pakistani-headed households had lower median total wealth than White British-headed households, although property represented a comparatively large component of their wealth. Approximately 73% of Pakistani-headed households held positive net property wealth, compared with 69% of White British-headed households. Property accounted for approximately 44% of total wealth among Pakistani-headed households. Total household wealth also includes financial assets, physical possessions and private pensions.

Research has documented informal financial arrangements among some British Pakistani families, including interest-free family lending and rotating savings associations known as kameti or committee savings. These arrangements enable participants to pool resources for house purchases, weddings, emergencies and business formation.

Government-commissioned qualitative research has identified comparatively high levels of overcrowding among South Asian households, including Pakistani households. Contributing factors include shortages of larger housing, affordability pressures, family size and preferences for multigenerational living. Extended households can provide shared childcare, financial support and pooled resources while also experiencing reduced privacy and pressure on living space.

Household assets may also include jewellery, gold, privately held businesses and property in Britain or overseas. Such assets are distinct from household income, and their valuation and reporting can vary between surveys. The extent of assets not captured in official wealth statistics has not been established for British Pakistanis nationally.

=== Remittances and overseas property ===
British Pakistanis maintain economic connections with Pakistan through remittances, property ownership, family support and business investment. The University of Oxford's Migration Observatory identified Pakistan as a major estimated destination for remittances from the United Kingdom, while noting limitations in measuring informal transfers and identifying the ethnicity of senders.

These connections are particularly visible in Mirpur and surrounding areas of Azad Kashmir, where remittances from British Pakistani families have supported residential construction, businesses and community development. Mirpur has frequently been described as "Little Britain" because of its longstanding migration links with the UK. Reporting has documented large houses and residential developments financed through overseas earnings, including properties used by British Pakistani families during visits to Pakistan.

=== Philanthropy ===
A 2019 study by the British Council and Pakistan Centre for Philanthropy estimated annual philanthropic activity by the British Pakistani diaspora at approximately £1.25 billion in 2018. This comprised £742 million in monetary donations, £346 million in in-kind contributions and £165 million in the estimated value of volunteering. Approximately half supported causes in Pakistan and half supported activities in Britain. Religious giving, including Zakat, and fundraising through mosques and community organisations were important components.

Community fundraising has supported charitable projects in Pakistan and Britain. In June 2024, a fundraising dinner in Bradford raised £750,000 towards a planned 500-bed hospital in Mirpur developed by the Kashmir Orphan Relief Trust (KORT). A subsequent event in Derby raised more than £1 million, while fundraising across Peterborough, Leeds, Bradford, Oldham and Derby reportedly exceeded £3.5 million within several days. A later Dewsbury event received a separate £1 million pledge from the UK charity One Nation towards the hospital project.

== Media ==
=== Cinema ===
Notable films that depict the lives of British Pakistanis include My Beautiful Laundrette, which received a BAFTA award nomination, and the popular East is East which won a BAFTA award, a British Independent Film Award and a London Film Critics' Circle Award. The Infidel looked at a British Pakistani family living in East London, and depicted religious issues and the identity crisis facing a young member of the family. The film Four Lions looked at issues of religion and extremism. It followed British Pakistanis living in Sheffield in the North of England. The sequel to East is East, called West is West, was released in the UK on 25 February 2011.

Citizen Khan is a sitcom developed by Adil Ray which is based on a British Pakistani family in Sparkhill, Birmingham, dubbed the "capital of British Pakistan". The soap opera EastEnders also features many British Pakistani characters. Pakistani Lollywood films have been screened in British cinemas. Indian Bollywood films are also shown in British cinemas and are popular with many second generation British Pakistanis and British Asians.

=== Television ===
BBC has news services in Urdu and Pashto. In 2005, the BBC showed an evening of programmes under the title Pakistani, Actually, offering an insight into the lives of Pakistanis living in Britain and some of the issues faced by the community. The executive producer of the series said, "These documentaries provide just a snapshot of contemporary life among British Pakistanis—a community who are often misunderstood, neglected or stereotyped."

The Pakistani channels of GEO TV, ARY Digital and many others are available to watch on subscription. These channels are based in Pakistan and cater to the Pakistani diaspora, as well as anyone of South Asian origin. They feature news, sports and entertainment, with some channels broadcast in Urdu/Hindi.

Mishal Husain is of Pakistani descent, and a newsreader and presenter for the BBC. Saira Khan hosts the BBC children's programme Beat the Boss. Martin Bashir is a Christian Pakistani who worked for ITV, then American Broadcasting Company, before becoming BBC News Religious Affairs correspondent in 2016.

=== Radio ===
The BBC Asian Network is a radio station available across the entire UK and is aimed at Britons of South Asian origin under 35 years of age. Apart from this popular station, there are many other national radio stations for or run by the British Pakistani community, including Sunrise and Kismat Radio of London.

Regional British Pakistani stations include Asian Sound of Manchester, Radio XL and Apni Awaz of Bradford and Sunrise Radio Yorkshire which based in Bradford. These radio stations generally run programmes in a variety of South Asian languages.

=== Print ===
The Pakistani newspaper the Daily Jang has the largest circulation of any daily Urdu-language newspaper in the world. It is sold at several Pakistani newsagents and grocery stores across the UK. Urdu newspapers, books and other periodical publications are available in libraries which have a dedicated Asian languages service. Examples of British-based newspapers written in English include the Asian News (published by Trinity Mirror) and the Eastern Eye. These are free weekly newspapers aimed at all British Asians.

British Pakistanis involved in print media include Sarfraz Manzoor, who is a regular columnist for The Guardian, one of the largest and most popular newspaper groups in the UK. Anila Baig is a feature writer at The Sun, the biggest-selling newspaper in the UK.

== Politics ==
British Pakistani MPs by election 1997-2019
Election	Labour	Conservative	Scottish National Party	Other	Total	% of Parliament
1997	1	0	0	0	1	0.15
2001	2	0	0	0	2	0.31
2005	4	0	0	0	4	0.62
2010	5	2	0	0	7	1.08
2015	6	3	1	0	10	1.54
2017	9	3	0	0	12	1.85
2019	10	5	0	0	15	2.31

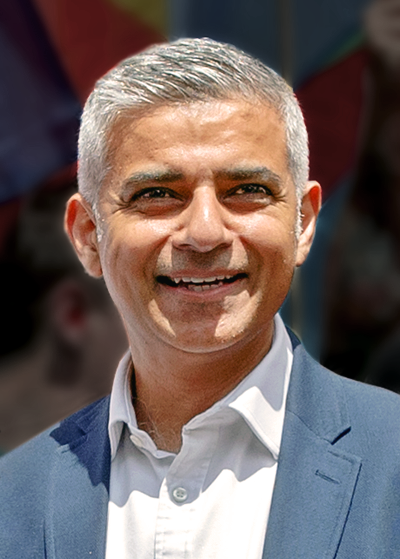
Sadiq Khan is the current Mayor of London since 2016.

British Pakistanis are represented in politics at all levels. In 2019, there were fifteen British Pakistani MPs in the House of Commons. Notable members have included Shadow Secretary of State for Justice Sadiq Khan and Home Secretary, Sajid Javid, described by The Guardian as a 'rising star' in the Tory party. The Guardian stated that, "The treasury minister is highly regarded on the right and would be the Tories' first Muslim leader", whereas The Independent said he could become the next Chancellor of the Exchequer, which he did in July 2019. The 2019 United Kingdom general election saw a record number of British Pakistani candidates.

Notable British Pakistanis in the House of Lords includes Minister for Faith and Communities and former chairman of the Conservative Party Sayeeda Warsi, Tariq Ahmad, Nazir Ahmed, and Qurban Hussain. Mohammad Sarwar of the Labour Party was the first Muslim Member of Parliament, being elected in Glasgow Central in 1997 and serving until 2010. In 2013, Sarwar quit British politics and returned to Pakistan, where he joined the government and briefly served as the Governor of Punjab. Other politicians in Pakistan known to have held dual British citizenship include Rehman Malik, Ishrat-ul-Ibad Khan, and some members of the Pakistani national and provincial legislative assemblies.

In 2007, 257 British Pakistanis were serving as elected councillors or mayors in Britain. British Pakistanis make up a sizeable proportion of British voters and are known to make a difference in elections, both local and national. They are much more active in the voting process, with 67% voting in the last general elections of 2005, compared to just over 60% for the country.

Apart from their involvement in domestic politics, the British Pakistani community also maintains keen focus on the politics of Pakistan and has served as an important soft power prerogative in historical, cultural, economic and bilateral relations between Pakistan and the United Kingdom. Major Pakistani political parties such as the Pakistan Muslim League (N), Pakistan Tehreek-e-Insaf, the Pakistan Peoples Party, the Muttahida Qaumi Movement and others have political chapters and support in the UK.

Some of the most influential names in Pakistani politics are known to have studied, lived or exiled in the UK. London, in particular, has long served as a hub of Pakistani political activities overseas. The British Azad Kashmiri community has a strong culture of diaspora politics, playing a significant role in advocating the settlement of the Kashmir conflict and raising awareness of human rights abuses in Indian-administered Jammu and Kashmir. Much of Pakistani lobbying and intelligence operations in the UK are focused on this key diaspora issue.

=== Labour Party ===
The Labour Party has traditionally been the natural choice for many British Pakistanis. The Labour Party are said to be more dependent on votes from British Pakistanis than the Conservative Party. British Pakistani support for Labour reportedly fell because of party's decision to take part in the Iraq War, when a substantial minority of Muslim voters switched from Labour to the Liberal Democrats. A 2005 poll carried out by ICM Research (ICM) showed that 40% of British Pakistanis intended to vote for Labour in 2010, compared to 5% for the Conservative Party and 21% for the Liberal Democrats. However, according to survey research, 60% of Pakistani voters voted Labour in the subsequent general election in 2010. and this figure rose to more than 90% in the 2017 general election.

High-profile British Pakistani politicians within the Labour Party include Shahid Malik and Lord Nazir Ahmed, who became the first Muslim life peer in 1998. Sadiq Khan became the first Muslim cabinet minister in June 2009, after being invited to accept the post by then-Prime Minister Gordon Brown. Anas Sarwar served as an MP for Glasgow Central between 2010–15, and was elected as Leader of the Scottish Labour Party in February 2021. He first stood at the 2017 Scottish Labour leadership election, where he finished in second place to Richard Leonard. Shabana Mahmood is the current Labour Home Secretary.

=== Conservative Party ===
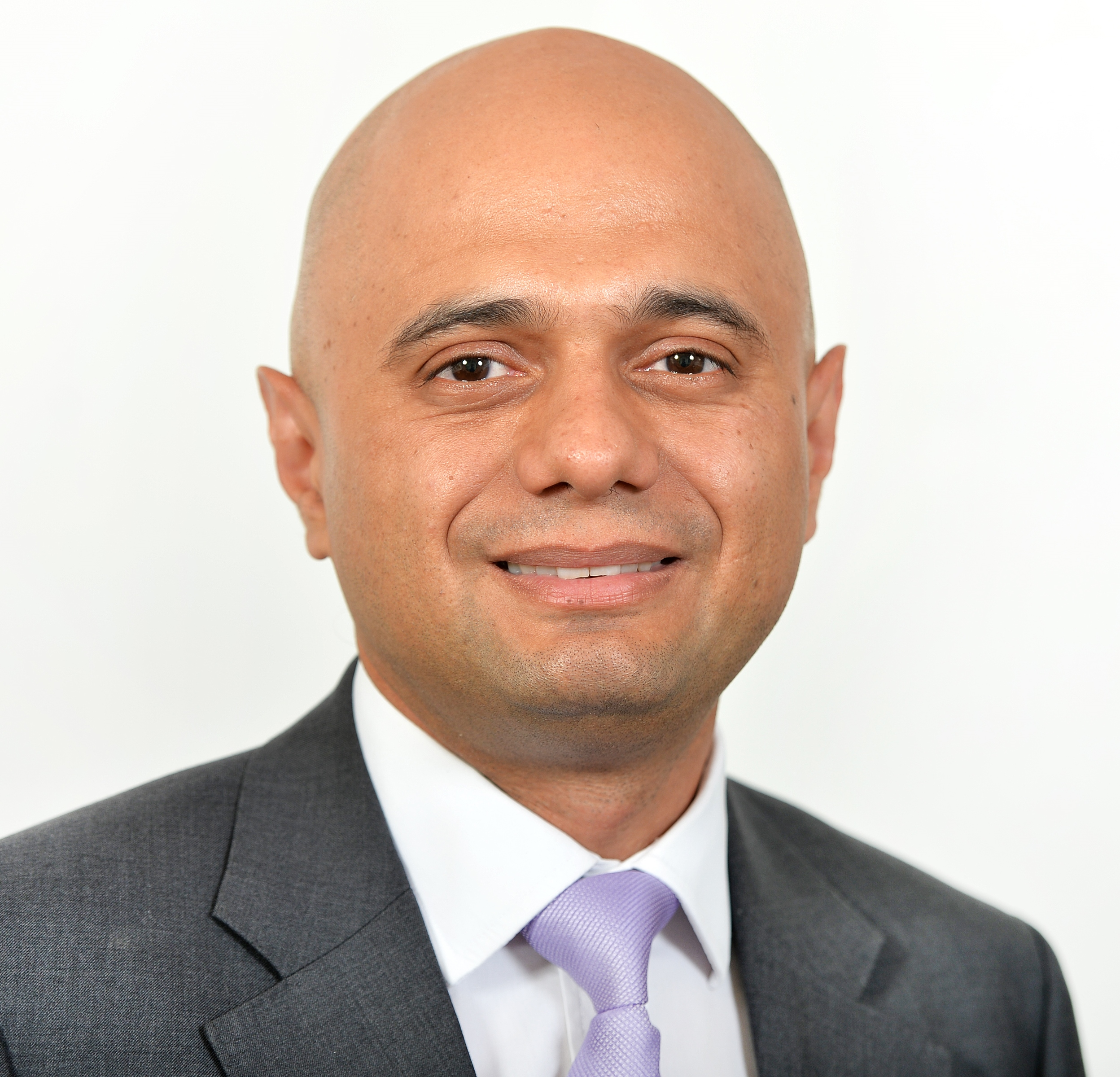
Sajid Javid, is the former Chancellor of the Exchequer. He was the vice-president of Chase Manhattan Bank before working as a managing director for Deutsche Bank.

Some commentators have argued the Conservative Party has become increasingly popular with some British Pakistanis, as they become more affluent. However, analysis of a representative sample of ethnic Pakistani voters in the 2010 general election from the Ethnic Minority British Election Study shows that 13% of them voted Conservative, compared to 60% Labour and 25% Liberal Democrat.

The proportion of British Pakistanis voting Conservative fell at the 2015 and 2017 general elections. Michael Wade, chairman of the Conservative Friends of Pakistan, has argued that while polls have shown that only one third of British Pakistani men would never vote Conservative, "the fact is that the Conservative Party has not been successful in reaching out to the British Pakistani community; and so they, in turn, have not looked to the Conservative Party as the one that represents their interests".

The Conservative Friends of Pakistan aims to develop and promote the relationship between the Conservative Party, the British Pakistani community and Pakistan. David Cameron opened a new gym aimed at British Pakistanis in Bolton after being invited by Olympic gold medallist Amir Khan in 2009. Cameron also appointed Tariq Ahmad, Baron Ahmad of Wimbledon, a Mirpuri-born politician, a life peerage. Multi-millionaire Sir Anwar Pervez, who claims to have been born Conservative, has donated large sums to the party. Sir Anwar's donations have entitled him to become a member of the influential Conservative Leader's Group.

Shortly after becoming the Conservative Party leader, Cameron spent two days living with a British Pakistani family in Birmingham. He said the experience taught him about the challenges of cohesion and integration.

Sajjad Karim was a member of the European Parliament before Brexit. He represented North West England through the Conservative Party. In 2005, Karim became the founding chairman of the European Parliament Friends of Pakistan Group. He is also a member of the Friends of India and Friends of Bangladesh groups. Rehman Chishti became the new Conservative Party MP for Gillingham and Rainham in 2010. Sayeeda Warsi was promoted to chairman of the Conservative Party by the prime minister shortly after the 2010 UK general election. Warsi was the shadow minister for community cohesion when the Conservatives were in opposition before the 2010 election. She was the first Muslim and first Asian woman to serve in a British cabinet. Both of Warsi's grandfathers served with the British Army in the Second World War.

=== Liberal Democrats, Scottish National Party and Others ===
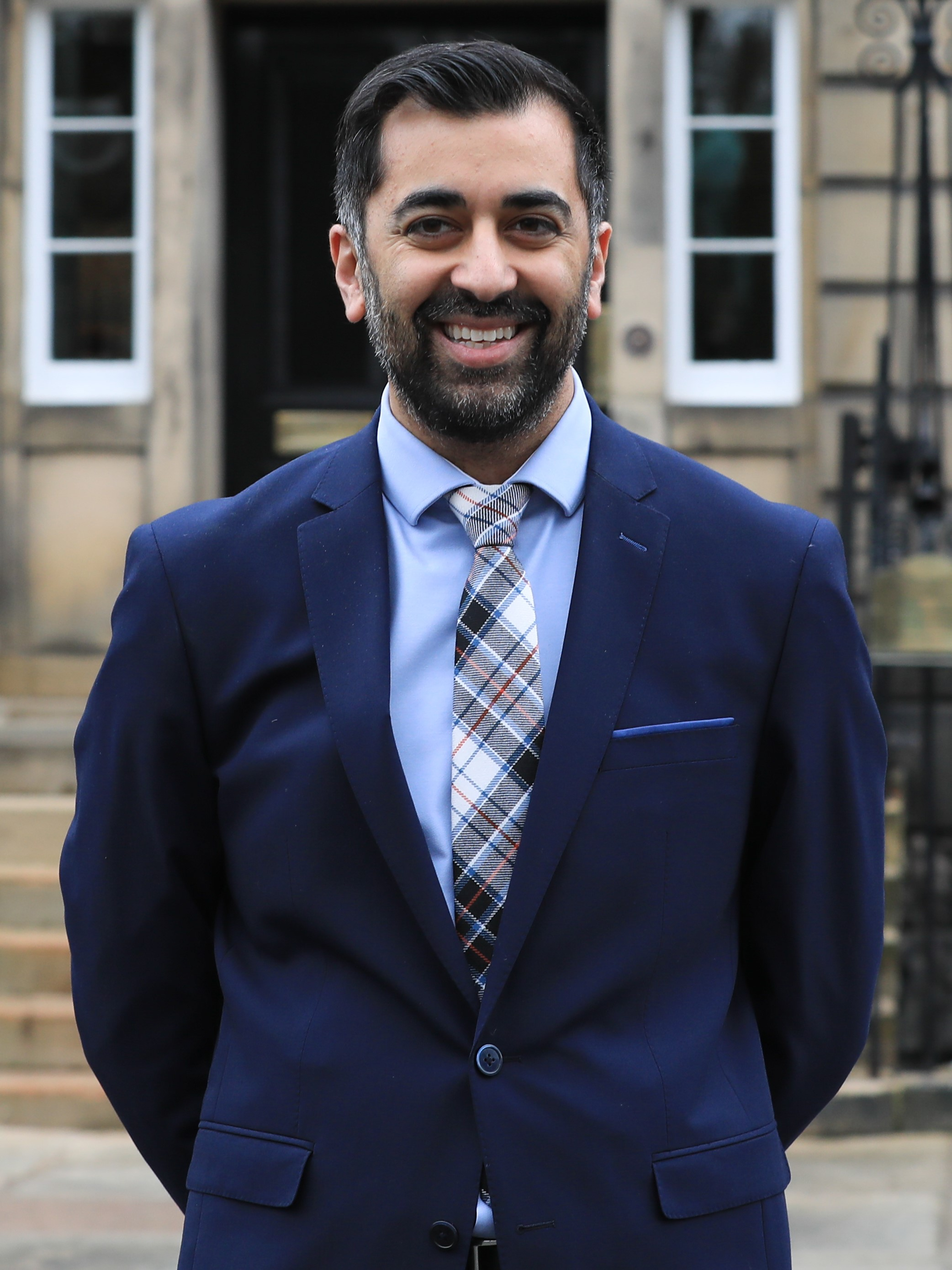
Humza Yousaf, former First Minister of Scotland

At the 2003 Scottish Parliament election, Scottish Pakistani voters supported the Scottish National Party more than the average Scottish voter. The SNP is a centre-left, nationalist party that campaigns for the independence of Scotland from the United Kingdom. SNP candidate Bashir Ahmad was elected to the Scottish Parliament to represent Glasgow at the 2007 election, becoming the first member of the Scottish Parliament to be elected with a Scottish Asian background. On 29 March 2023, Humza Yousaf was elected First Minister of Scotland, becoming the first British Pakistani to hold this position, and simultaneously the first Muslim leader of a European country. He also served as Leader of the Scottish National Party between 2023-24.

Salma Yaqoob is the former leader of the left-wing, anti-Zionist Respect Party. The small party has seen success in areas such as Sparkbrook in Birmingham and Newham in London, where there are large Pakistani populations. Qassim Afzal is a senior Liberal Democrat politician of Pakistani origin. In 2009, he accompanied the then Deputy Prime Minister of the United Kingdom to meetings with Pakistan's president, Asif Ali Zardari. There has never been a Pakistani MP from the Liberal Democrats.

== Contemporary issues ==
=== Racism and discrimination ===
The chance of a Pakistani being racially attacked in a year is greater than 4%—the highest rate in the country, along with British Bangladeshis—though this has come down from 8% a year in 1996.

Police recorded figures also showed that in 2018–19, the highest proportion of victims (18%) of racially aggravated hate crimes were of Pakistani ethnicity. Between 2005 and 2012, just over half of the victims of Islamophobic incidents in London were Pakistani in ethnic appearance.

The term "Paki" is often used as a racist slur to describe Pakistanis and can also be directed towards other non-Pakistani South Asians. There have been some attempts by the youngest generation of British Pakistanis to reclaim the word and use it in a non-offensive way to refer to themselves, though this remains controversial.

In 2001, riots occurred in Bradford. Two reasons given for the riots were social deprivation and the actions of extreme right wing groups such as the National Front (NF). The Anti-Nazi League held a counter protest to a proposed march by the NF leading to clashes between police and the local South Asian population, with the majority of those being involved being of Pakistani descent.

==== "Paki-bashing" ====
Starting in the late 1960s, and peaking in the 1970s and 1980s, violent gangs opposed to immigration took part in frequent attacks known as "Paki-bashing", which targeted and assaulted Pakistanis and other South Asians. "Paki-bashing" was unleashed after Enoch Powell's inflammatory Rivers of Blood speech in 1968, and peaked during the 1970s–1980s, with the attacks mainly linked to far-right fascist, racist and anti-immigrant movements, including the white power skinheads, the National Front, and the British National Party (BNP).

These attacks were usually referred to as either "Paki-bashing" or "skinhead terror", with the attackers usually called "Paki-bashers" or "skinheads". According to Robert Lambert, "influential sections of the national and local media" did "much to exacerbate" anti-immigrant and anti-Pakistani rhetoric. The attacks were also fuelled by systemic failures of state authorities, which included under-reporting of racist attacks, the criminal justice system not taking racist attacks seriously, and racial harassment by police.

=== Perception by the majority population ===
As per a 2013 YouGov research, British Pakistanis are seen to not integrate into society as well when compared to immigrants of African or Eastern European background but conversely they're also perceived to be "as hard-working as well as more entrepreneurial and less likely to be either leaning on the state or a drain on the economy than the other groups", and also "as less threatening in general and less corrupt than Eastern Europeans."

== See also ==
=== Related Pakistanis ===
- British Mirpuri
- Pakistani community of London
- Overseas Pakistani
  - Pakistanis in France
  - Pakistanis in Ireland
  - Pakistanis in the Netherlands

=== Related groups ===
- British Asian
  - British Bangladeshi
  - British Indian
  - British Sri Lankans
- Afghans in the United Kingdom
- List of British Muslims

=== Arts and entertainment ===
- Asian Underground
- Bhangra (dance)
- Bhangra (music)
- List of British Pakistanis § Entertainment

=== Other ===
- Pakistan–United Kingdom relations
- Islam in the United Kingdom
- Britons in Pakistan
