= Shabir Hussain =

British chef and restaurateur (1968–2024)

- Born: 1967 or 1968
- Died: 15 October 2024
- Occupations: Chef, restaurateur
- Known for: Naan tree

Shabir Hussain (1968 – 15 October 2024) was a British restaurateur and celebrity chef known as the "king of curry".

Hussain founded Akbar's Restaurant Group in 1995, a UK chain Pakistani restaurants, and owned "dozens of food venues". He invented the "naan tree", or "hanging naan", a metal structure with a solid base with hooks on both sides to hang large naan breads and save space within the restaurant, the use of which expanded and became a "craze". Hussain stated his biggest regret was "I could have patented it".

Hussain was named the United Kingdom "Curry King" at the 2011 English Curry Awards. The award ceremony, sponsored by online takeaway hungryhouse, was held in Manchester. In 2015 he was named "Curry Champion" at the Asian Curry Awards.

Hussain announced he had cancer in June 2024. He died on 15 October 2024, aged 56.
