= Mumtaz Khan Akbar =

Pakistani-born British businessman

Mumtaz Khan Akbar (Urdu: ممتاز خان اکبر; born 1959) is a Pakistani businessman who is the founder and owner of the Mumtaz brand. He was born in Azad Kashmir, Pakistan, and moved to Britain in 1972. Mumtaz Khan has since become one of the richest men in Yorkshire and Lancashire.

He has received two honorary doctorates; one from the University of Bradford in 2012, and the other from Leeds Metropolitan University in 2013.

Mumtaz Khan is the founder of Halal Baby Food and Mumtaz Group of companies.

He was disqualified from being a company director by the High Court in Leeds on 16 November 2017 following an investigation by the Insolvency Service. The disqualification began on 8 December 2017.

== See also ==
- Mumtaz Group
