= Britons in Pakistan =

British in Pakistan
Total population
- 79,447 (2015)

Languages
- English (British and Pakistani), Pahari, Punjabi, (Potwari) and Urdu

Religion
- Christianity · Islam

Related ethnic groups
- British people, British diaspora

Britons in Pakistan (Urdu: برطانوی باشندے) consist of British people and their descendants who emigrated from the United Kingdom. A sizeable number of Britons in Pakistan are British Pakistanis, descendants of Pakistani immigrants to the UK prior to their return. The city of Mirpur in Azad Kashmir has often been dubbed as 'Little Britain' due to the majority of British Pakistanis hailing from this region, and hence maintaining great settlement connections with the city.

In 2005, there were about 47,000 British expatriates in Pakistan, by 2015, the number had increased to 79,447.

== Education ==
Schools catering to British children:

- British Overseas School

== Notable people ==
- Geoffrey Langlands—retired British Major, a retired teacher and educator
- George Fulton - Karachi-based English journalist
- Jemima Khan - British Pakistani journalist, ex-wife of Imran Khan
- David Alesworth - English artist
- Misbah Rana
- Mirza Tahir Hussain
- Adil Omar - English-born Pakistani rapper
- Hasnat Khan - British Pakistani doctor known for his affair with Princess Diana, currently working in Lahore
- Alys Faiz - British-born naturalized Pakistani poet, writer, journalist, human rights activist, social worker and teacher.
- Marina Khan - Daughter of English Mother and Pakistani father - A famous Pakistani Actress and Director
- Bilqis (Christobel) Taseer, mother of Punjab Governor, Salmaan Taseer
- Marjorie Husain - artist and art critic based in the country between 1960s and 2019.

== See also ==
- Pakistan–United Kingdom relations
- Immigration to Pakistan
- British diaspora
- Commonwealth diaspora
- Pakistanis in the United Kingdom
- Anglo-Indian people
