= Mumtaz Group =

English restaurant group

Mumtaz
- Company type: Private (Limited liability)
- Founded: 1979
- Founder: Mumtaz Khan Akbar
- Headquarters: Bradford, West Yorkshire, United Kingdom
- Key people: Mumtaz Khan Akbar, Dr Gul-Nawaz Khan Akbar, Rab-Nawaz Khan Akbar
- Products: Restaurants; Express foods Food processing
- Website: mumtaz.co.uk

Mumtaz (Urdu: ممتاز) is a restaurant group headquartered in Bradford, England. It was founded in 1979 by Mumtaz Khan Akbar. The group has expanded to include two additional locations, with the second restaurant in Bradford opening in 2008, followed by a Leeds location in 2010, and a Manchester branch in 2016.

In addition to its restaurant operations, Mumtaz Group manages a food processing division known as Mumtaz Food Industries. One of its primary facilities, which includes offices and warehouses, is situated in Mytholmroyd, West Yorkshire. The organization also maintains a collaborative relationship with Bradford College.

Mumtaz Group pioneered the introduction of Halal baby food to the market. Its production facilities in Spain, Switzerland, Pakistan, Malaysia and France enable the group to export its products to over 36 countries worldwide.

From 2010 to 2014, the group ventured into franchising by operating a chain of outlets called "Jaldi Jaldi." The inaugural Jaldi Jaldi store was launched in Leeds by James Caan in April 2010. However, the majority of these outlets shut in 2013, with the last remaining store, at Leeds University Union, ceasing operations in April 2014.

== Disqualification of directors ==
Founder Mumtaz Khan Akbar was disqualified from being a company director by the High Court in Leeds on 16 November 2017 following an investigation by the Insolvency Service. The disqualification began on 8 December 2017.

On 9 February 2018, Dr Gul-Nawaz Khan Akbar, Mumtaz Khan Akbar, Rab Nawaz Khan Akbar, Fameeda Akbar and Kauser Akbar were disqualified relating to their directorships of Greentabs Ltd (trading, as Mumtaz Food Industries Ltd).

On 24 May 2013, Greentabs Ltd (Mumtaz Food Industries Ltd) went into voluntary liquidation owing £805,630, and during the proceedings it was discovered Dr Gul-Nawaz Khan Akbar, managing director, had used company funds to buy £976,055 gold bullion for his sole benefit between 30 November 2012 and 11 December 2012, will full knowledge of the board of directors, whilst £447,997 remained unpaid to creditors.

Dr Gul-Nawaz Khan Akbar was banned for six years, his two brothers were banned three years for facilitating the transaction, his wife and the wife of his brother, the founder of the Mumtaz Group (Mumtaz Khan Akbar), were each banned for two years for failing to uphold corporate governance.

== 2018 tax case ==
In 2018 HM Revenue and Customs began proceedings against members and former members of the Mumtaz Group, after they consistently failed to pay corporate taxes on time. HMRC required the company to pay an advance bond in order to continue selling taxable goods; members of the group knowingly failed to pay the bond and legal proceedings were undertaken.

== Offence taken by White British workers ==
In January 2021, a former employee won an employment tribunal after a judge found the company had acted unlawfully through racial discrimination and unfair dismissal. A White employee was told by his supervisor that he wouldn't be able to understand how to cook the food as he was white, and that he "should go and work for an English company". When he complained about his supervisor's comments, no disciplinary action was taken against the supervisor, and the employee was dismissed from the company.
