= List of rulers of Pothohar plateau =

Historical rulers list

Throughout much of its modern history, the Pothohar Plateau in northern Punjab was autonomously or semi-autonomously dominated by various clans, most notably Gakhar and Khokhar tribes. Following a list of the known rulers of the Pothohar Plateau:

== List ==
Ruler	Reign	Note
Shaikha Khokhar	c. 1380 – 1399	Killed while fighting against Timur
Jasrat Khokhar	c. 1405 – 1442	Had his capital at Sialkot
Jhanda Khan Gakhar	unknown – c. 1493	Established the city of Rawalpindi
Tatar Khan Gakhar	unknown – 1519	Made alliance with Babur
Hathi Khan Gakhar	1519 – 1526	
Sarang Khan Gakhar	1526 – 1545	Died fighting against Sher Shah Suri at Rawat
Adam Khan Gakhar	1546 – 1555	Ruled under Mughal Empire
Kamal Khan Gakhar	1555 – 1566	
Said Khan Gakhar	1563 – 1597	Founded Saidpur village
Nazar Khan Gakhar	Unknown	Commander of 500
Allah Quli Khan Gakhar	1681 – 1705	
Pervaiz Pirvali Khan Gakhar		
Murad Khan Gakhar		
Mu’azzam Khan Gakhar	c. 1705 – 1739	
Muqarrab Khan Gakhar	c. 1739 – 1769	Last effective Gakhar ruler
