= Nara Mughlan =

- village
- Country: Pakistan
- Province: Punjab
- District: Chakwal

Languages
  - Official: Punjabi
- Time zone: UTC+5:30 (IST)

Nara Mughlan is a tiny village situated on the Potohar Plateau in Northern Punjab, approximately 80 km from Islamabad, Pakistan. It can be accessed from the M-2 motorway as well as from Grand Trunk (GT) Road, Islamabad – Lahore. Its distance from Chakwal city is about 39–40 km (on Jhelum – Chakwal Road) and it lies beside the Rajian oil fields. A by-road originating from the main road, 3–4 km ahead of village Mulhal Mughlan, leads directly to the village Nara Mughlan. The road passes through the Rajian oil fields which are located on the outskirts of the village. Nara Mughlan is bounded by villages Joorh in the North, Jand in the West, Chauntariyan in the South and Jhelum – Chakwal Road in the East.

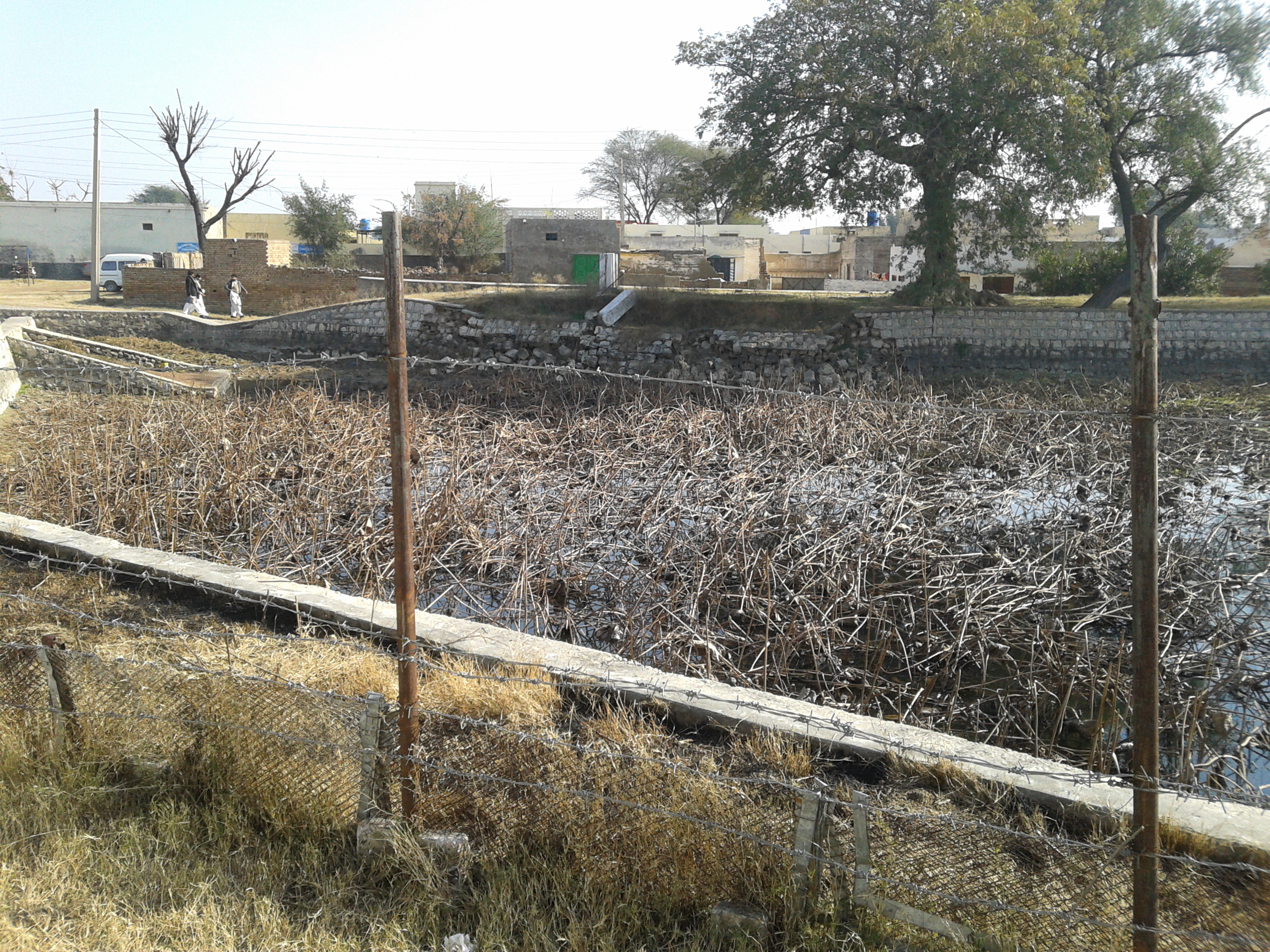
Entrance to the village, Nara Mughlan

== History ==
Nara Mughlan is a small rural habitation and is almost about 4–5 centuries old as per the local recollections. Originally its name was Nara Chauntrian which still appears in the Land Revenue documents. Major population of Nara Mughlan is made up of the Mughals Clan few Rajput families and in the Khanqa area residents belong to Mehiwal who came when Syed Feroz Shah Sherazi came locally, they relied on Government jobs and excelled really well to higher ranks in Civil and Military Services. The Mughals came to this area during the reign of Zaheer uddin Babar. Kassars or Mughal Kassars is a Mughal tribe that settled in this area during that time. Now they mainly occupy the Northern part of Dhani called Babial and Chaupeda. Presently, various branches of the Mughal clan and Mirza families live in this region. Other notable clans in Nara Mughlan are the Rajas and the Chaudhries.

== Language ==
The inhabitants at large speak Punjabi dialect of Potohari.

== Demography ==
According to the 1998 census, Chakwal is one of the most rural districts of Punjab.

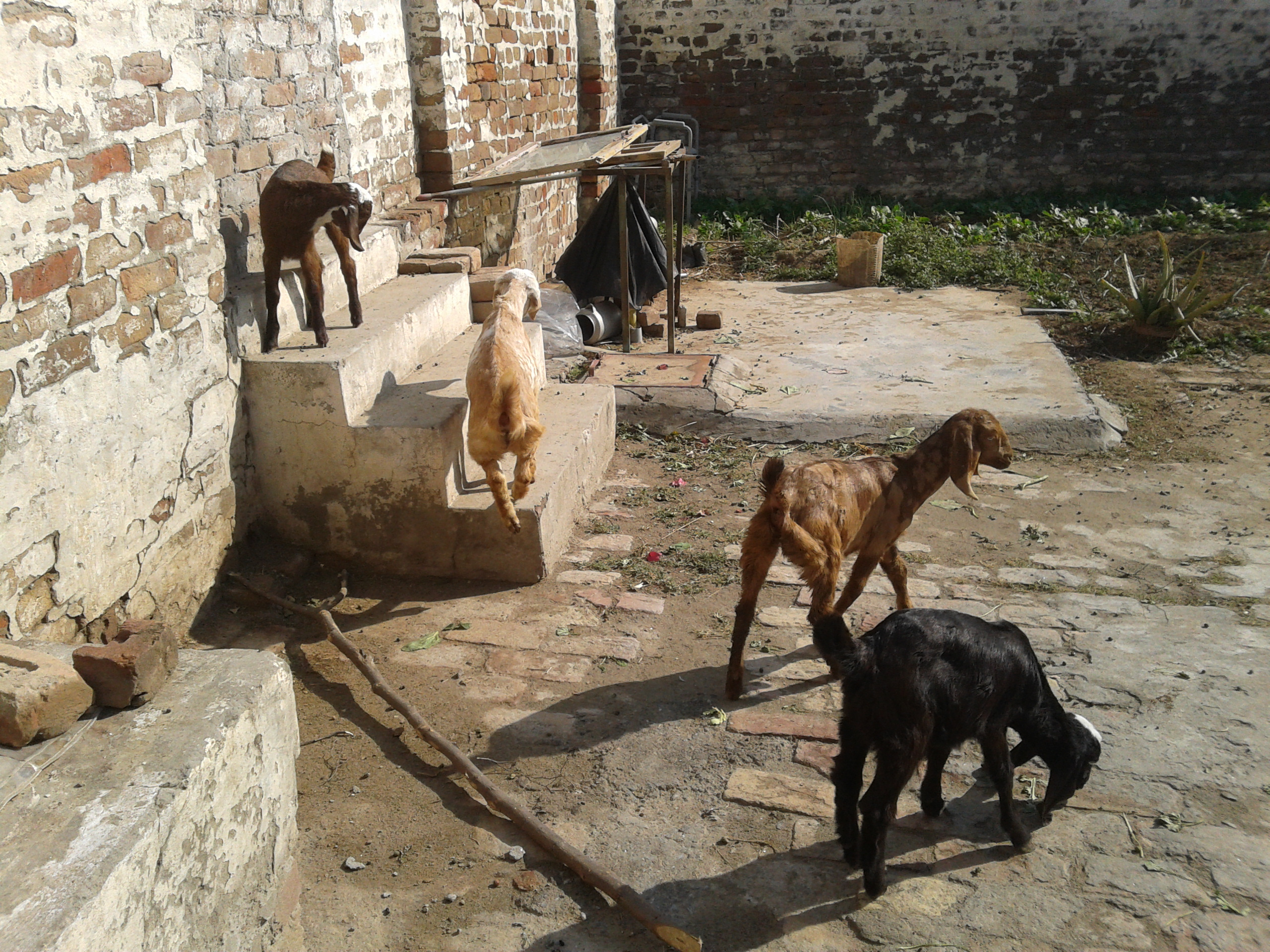
Animals kept as a source of livelihood

Nara Mughlan is a typical rural habitation with limited social/educational facilities. Majority of the people either join the defense/police force or go abroad in search of livelihood to USA/UK. People are predominantly divided on the political front. Some support the Muslim League, some the Peoples Party and some the Tehreek-e-Insaf.

== PODA ==
Potohar Organization for Development Advocacy is a local NGO which is currently active in Nara Mughlan, since 2003. Development of rural education systems and awareness of women rights are two of the major fields this organization is working on. PODA has opened a primary school for children in the village and is helping women learn some basic skills like embroidery and paper machete art. The handicrafts created by these talented women are sold under the name of “Sahara Handicrafts”.

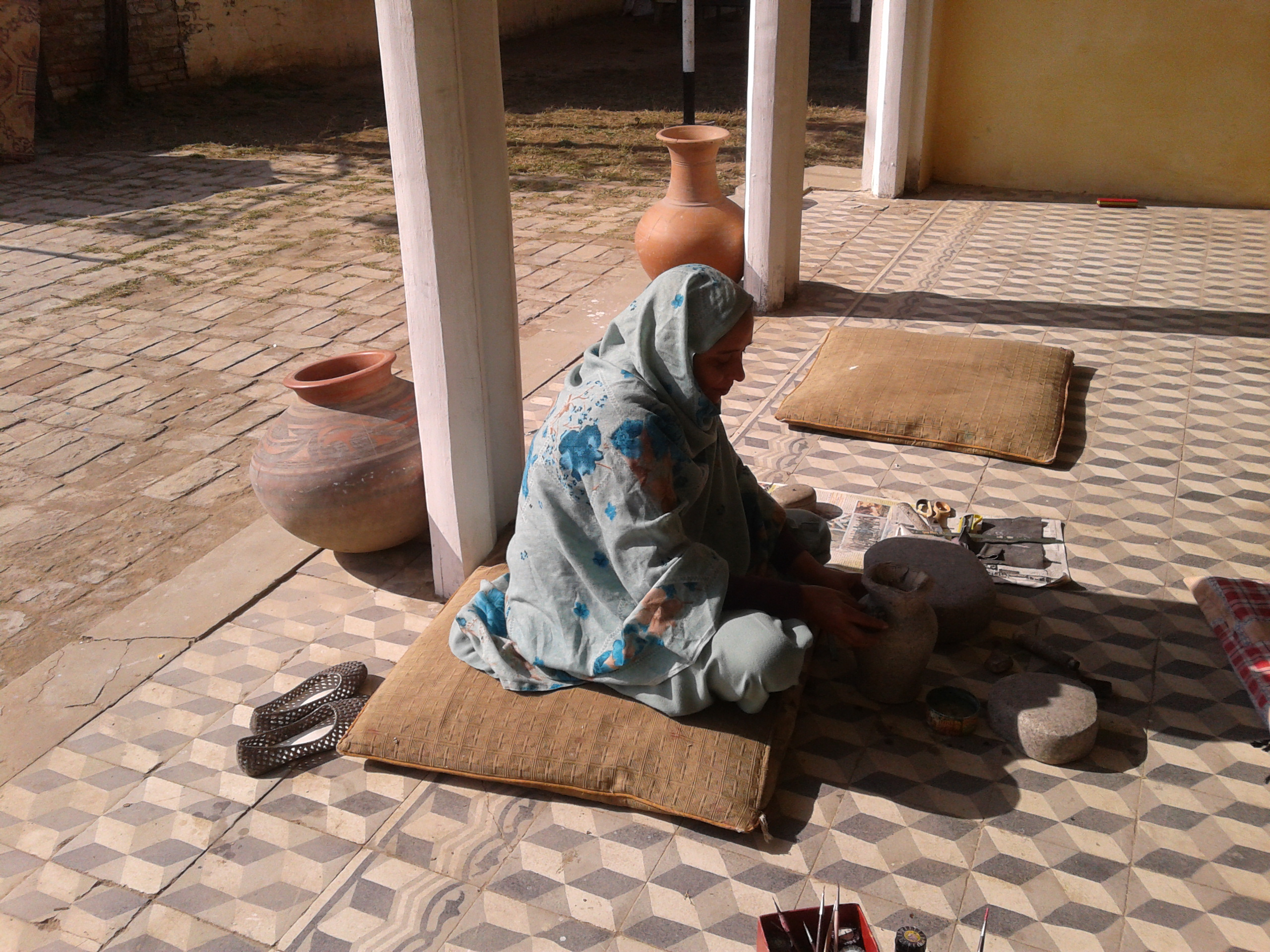
A woman at work in PODA's workshop

PODA is also helping farmers on the agricultural front and advising them regarding various agricultural problems.

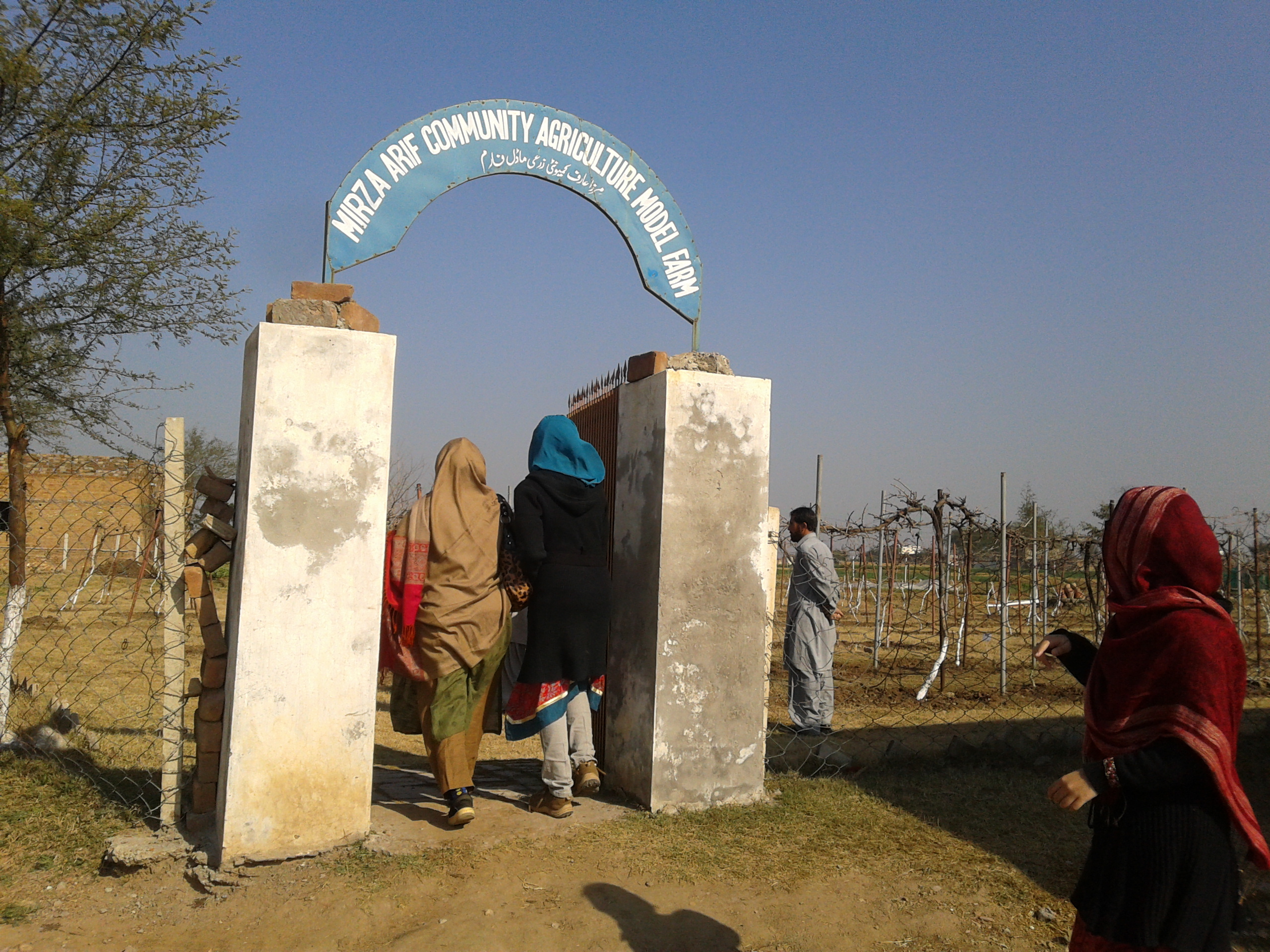
Agriculture Model Farm managed by PODA

== Construction ==
The village construction consists mainly of brick masonry mingled with some concrete and mud structures as well. There are approximately 200–300 houses in the village and most are provided with electricity. These houses are congested with a lot of people living inside them. There are three graveyards in the village as well. These graveyards are small and scattered. Tomb of Saint Feroz Shah Sherazi is also located in the village.

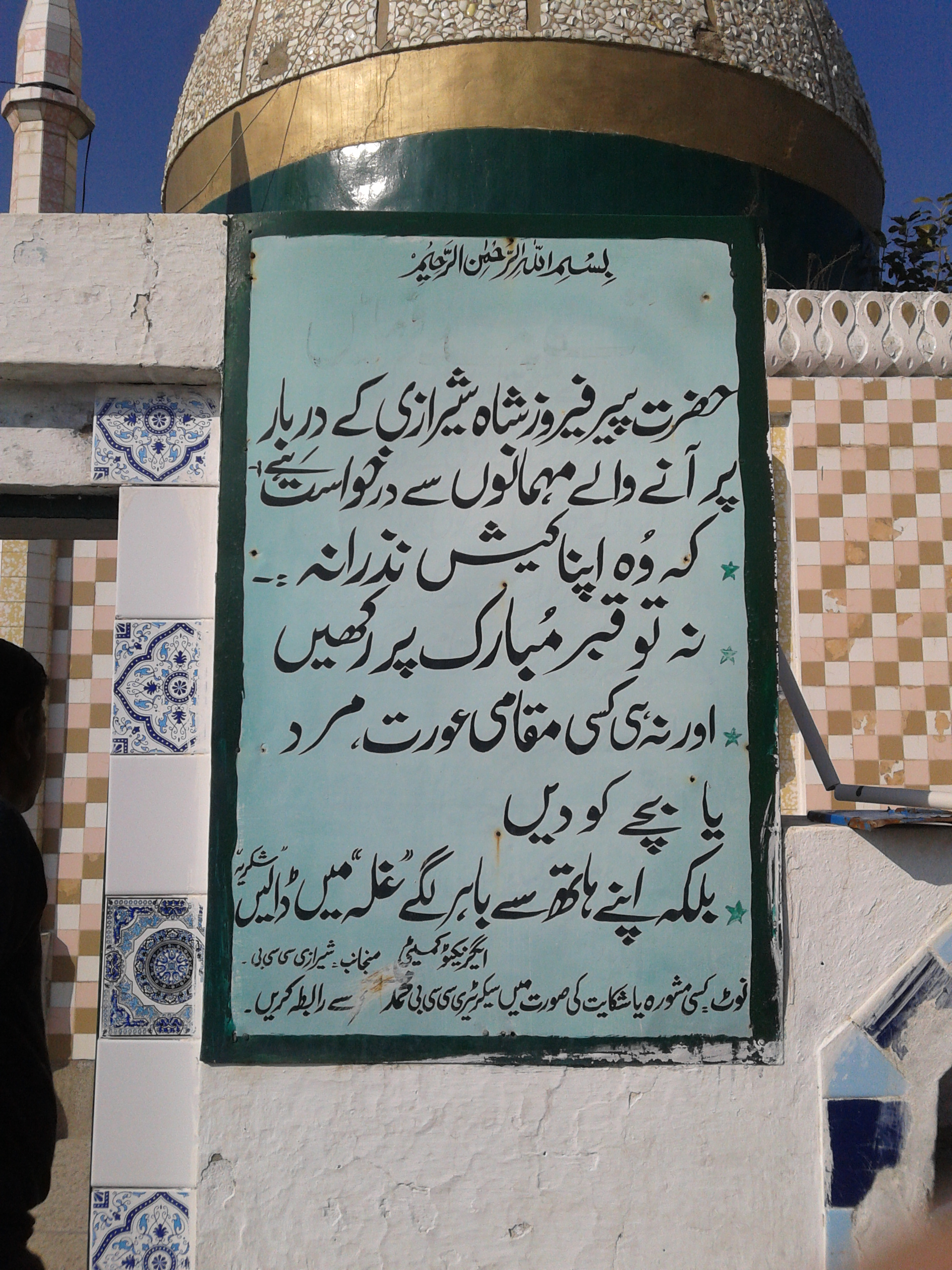
Tomb of Feroz Shah Sherazi

== Population ==
There is 60 percent of female population out of a total of more than 5000 people. Half of these people are illiterate. The number of women inhabiting the village is greater than the number of men. The men living in the village are either very old or very young. Young men leave the village for life in the cities. Like the other parts of the Chakwal District, this area also serves as a main recruiting ground for the Armed Forces and the Police.

== Geography ==
Nara Mughlan is located on the Potohar Plateau near the Salt Range. Potohar Plateau is situated in Northern Punjab and is surrounded by Jhelum River in the East, Indus River in the West, Kala Chitta Range in the North and the Salt Range in the South. A large number of brick kilns and mustard fields surround the little village as well.

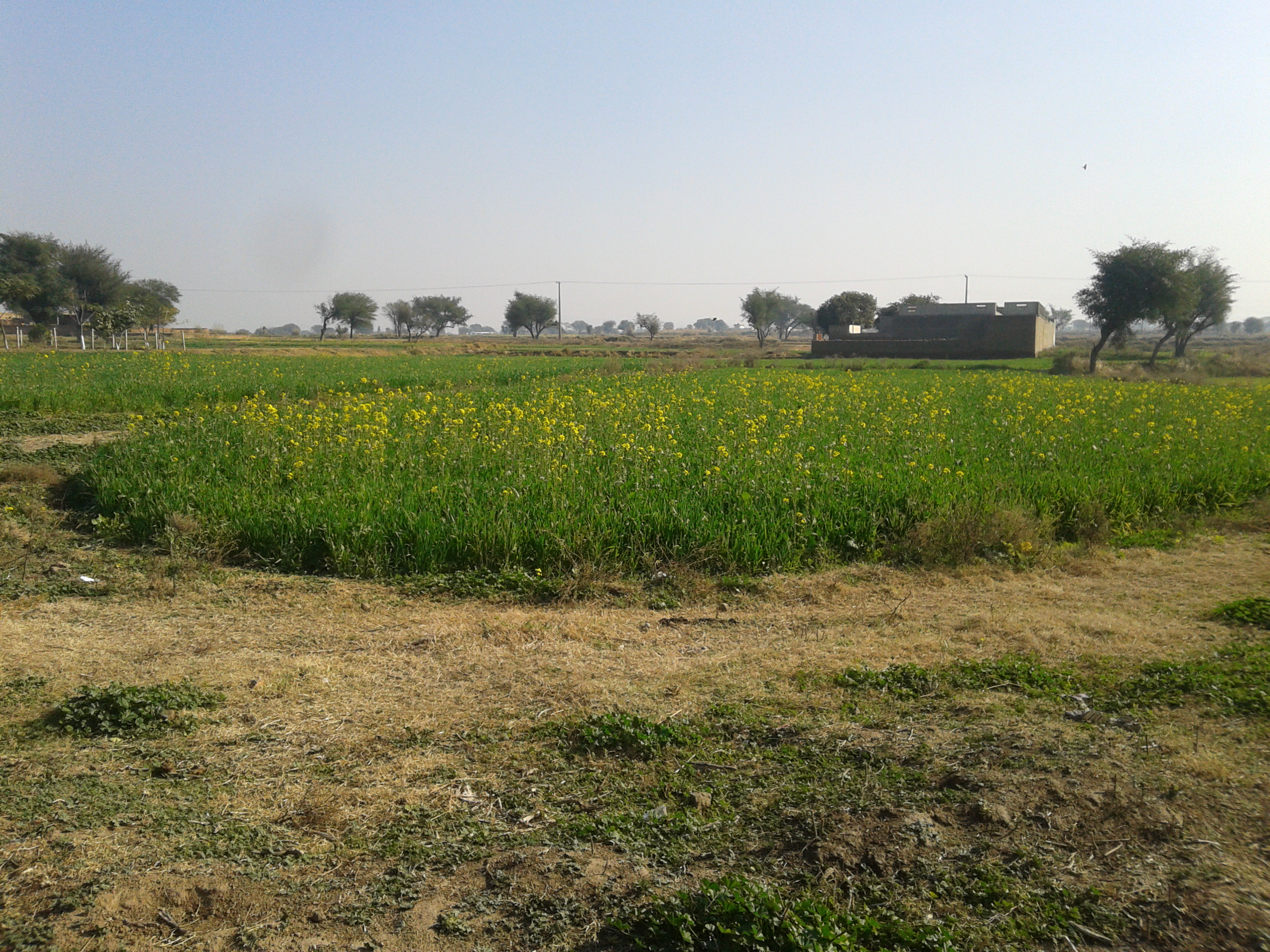
A view of the mustard fields

Land in Nara Mughlan is predominantly barani and the terrain mainly consists of plains interspersed with broken ground, hilly torrents, stony patches, and sparse scrub forests. Scarcity of natural water sources in the area remains the major issue for the locals. The wells are empty in June/July.

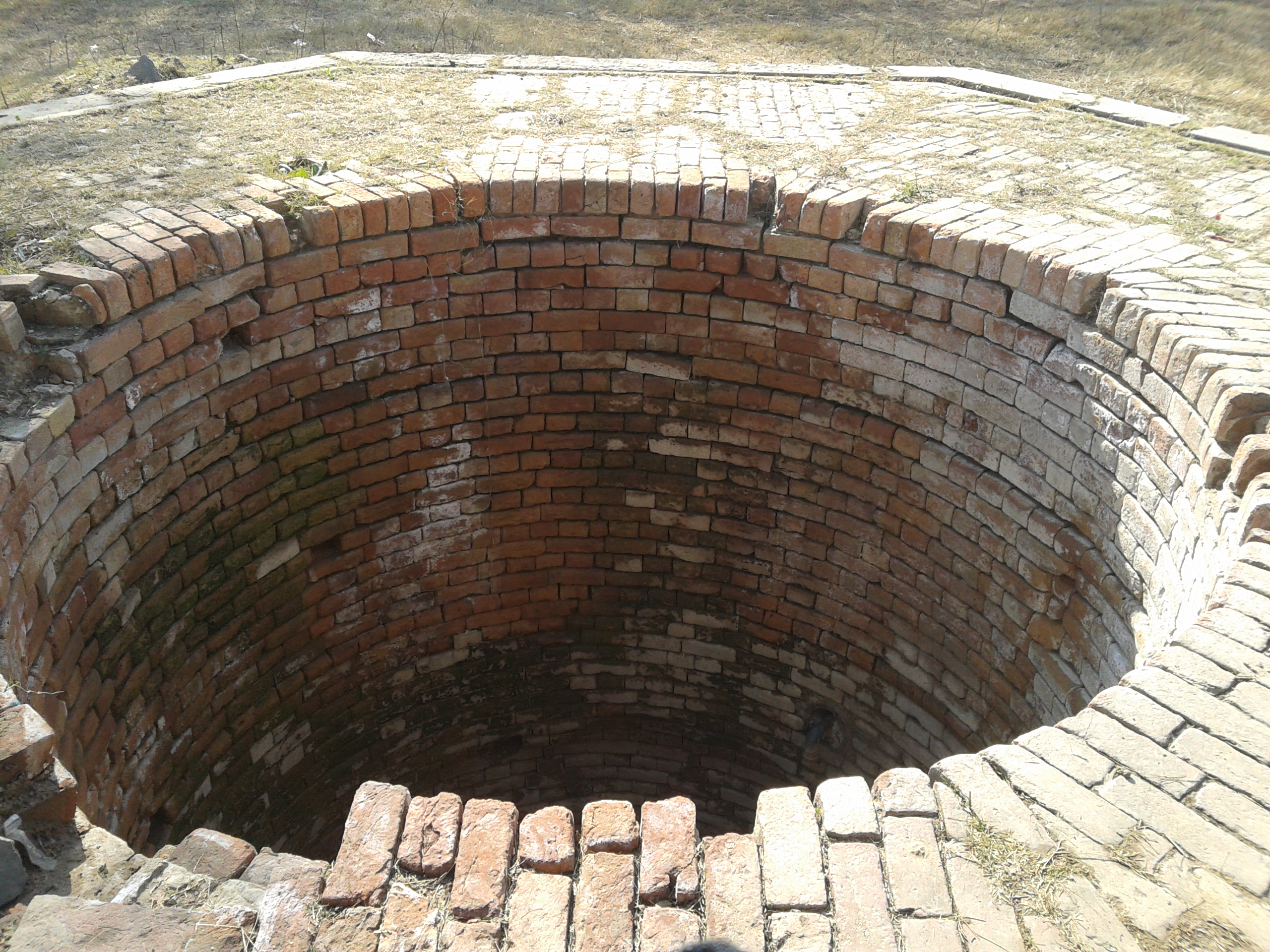
An old well, now inactive

During these months OGDC supplies the inhabitants with water through water tanks for free.

== Rajian Oil Fields ==
Oil and Gas Development Corporation (OGDC) started geological surveys in this area in 1992 and turned out successful as it discovered oil and gas deposits at Rajian which lies on the outskirts of Nara Mughlan. Since then, a large number of explorations in this area have been undertaken by the OGDC. Many of these explorations have turned out successful. Right now there are seven active oil fields in Nara Mughlan and its surroundings.

== Mosques ==
There are four mosques in Nara Mughlan. Two lie near the outskirts of the village while the other two lie at the centre. The main Jamia Mosque is named “Masjid-e-Quba”.

== Administration ==
The village Nara Mughlan forms a part of the Union Council Jand (village of famous Muslim League MNA Gen. (R) Abdul Majeed Malik) and falls under the jurisdiction of Police Station Dhumman in Tehsil and District Chakwal, since 1985. Prior to 1985, it was a part of District Jhelum.

== Education ==
In the case of education, the village is extremely backwards. Though, there has been some improvement lately, but still, a lot is required to be done.

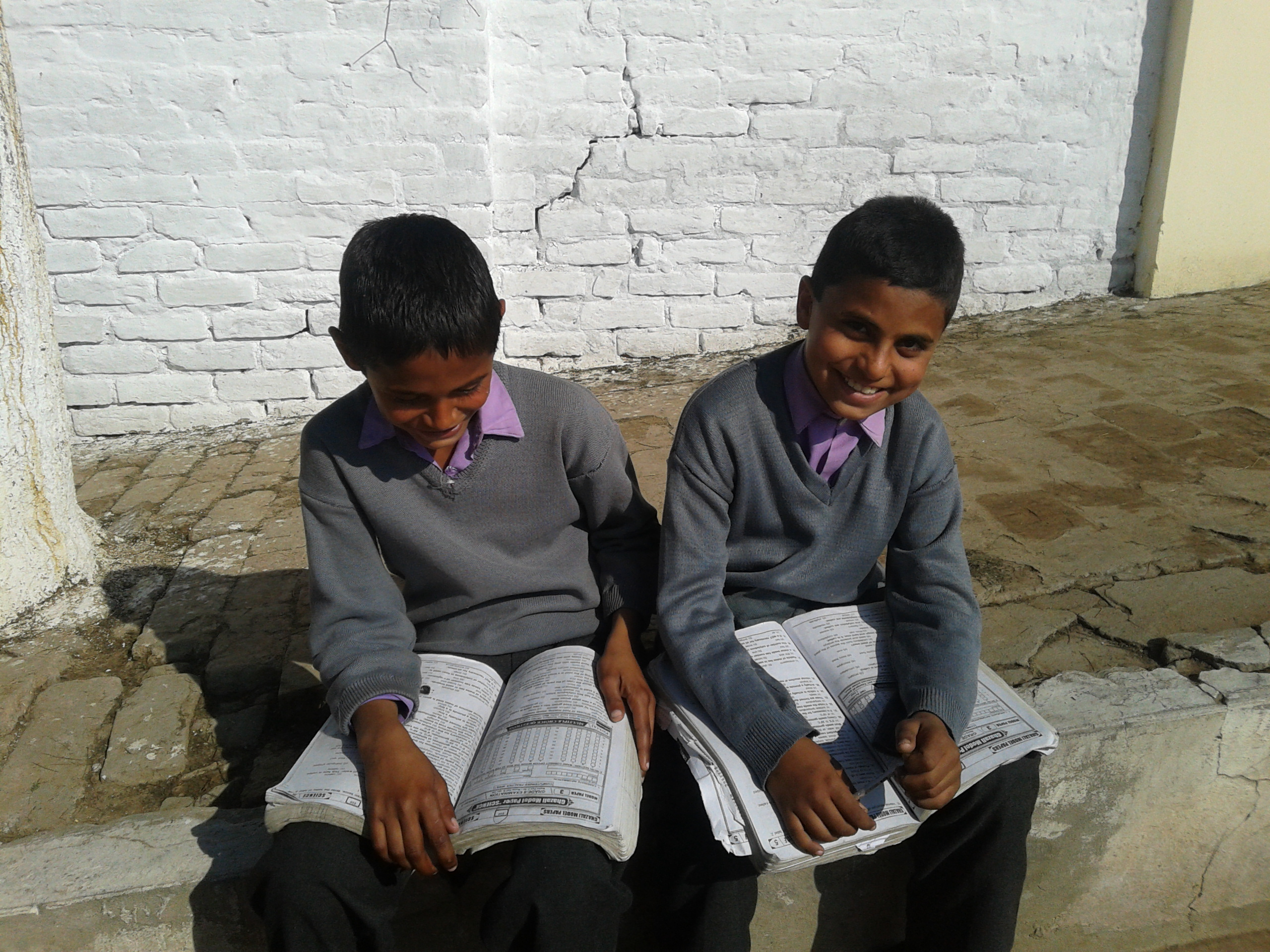
Students of Zamir Community Model School

The following educational facilities exist in the village:

- Government Primary School for girls
- Zamir Community Model School (Primary)

No high school facilities are available in the village. Therefore, students are forced to look up to the following facilities in the nearby areas:

- Government Primary and Middle School, Dhok Rajian
- Boys High School, Mulhal Mughlan
