= Pothohar Plateau =

Plateau in Punjab, Pakistan

- پوٹھوہار پٹھوار (Punjabi) سطح مرتفع پوٹھوہار (Urdu)

Highest point
- Peak: Sakesar
- Elevation: 1,525 m (5,003 ft)
- Coordinates: 32.5333°N 71.9333°E

Dimensions
- Length: 160–200 km (north–south)
- Width: 80–120 km (east–west)
- Area: 13,000 km^{2} (5,000 sq mi)

Naming
- Etymology: Pothohar (from the Punjabi word Paṭhvār, meaning 'Plateau')
- Nickname: Northern Punjab Plateau
- Native name: Punjabi: پوٹھوہار پٹھوار; romanized: Pōṭhōhār Paṭhvār
- Pronunciation: [poːˈʈʰoː(ɦ)aːɾ pəʈʰʋaːɾ]

Geography
- Location within Punjab, Pakistan Location within Pakistan
- Location: Punjab, Pakistan
- Country: Pakistan
- Province: (Punjab, Pakistan) Punjab (Note: A small portion in the northwest is the Islamabad Capital Territory)
- Region: Punjab
- Range coordinates: 32°58′N 72°15′E

Geology
- Mountain type: Plateau

The Pothohar Plateau (Punjabi: پوٹھوہار پَٹھوار, romanized: Pо̄ṭhoā̀r Paṭhwār; Urdu: سطح مرتفع پوٹھوہار, romanized: Satāh Murtafā Pо̄ṭhohār), (Old Persian: 𐎥𐎭𐎠𐎼), also known as the Northern Punjab Plateau, is a plateau within the Sagar Doab of north-western Punjab in Pakistan. It is bounded by the Indus and Jhelum rivers.

== Etymology ==
A late medieval manuscript, Kaigoharnameh, written by Raezadeh Diwan Duni Chand in 1725 CE on the order of Gakhar chiefs presents a detailed history of Gakhars in northern Punjab. The term in the manuscript has been written variously as Pathwar, Pot har and Pothohar; and appears to be related to the Punjabi term for a plateau (Paṭhār). According to Ahmad Hasan Dani, the term is derived from Prshtawar in Sanskrit, Prshta meaning "back" of the Indus River and War meaning "area". According to the archaeologist Abdur Rahman, the name derives from the words poṭho, from Indo-Aryan piṭhā (lit. Back) and hāra (lit. Land), the "land on the back (of mountains)" or figuratively highlands.

== Geography ==
Pothohar Plateau is bounded on the east by the Jhelum River, on the west by the Indus River, on the north by the Kala Chitta Range and the Margalla Hills, and on the south by the Salt Range. The southern end of the plateau is bounded by the Thal Desert. The 12,949 square kilometres of the plateau range from an average height of 365 metres (1,198 ft) to 579 metres (1,900 ft) above the sea level. Sakesar (1525 m) in the Salt Range in Khushab District is the highest peak of the region.

== History ==
=== Ancient history ===
The Sivapithecus indicus fossil skull of an extinct ape species was discovered in Potohar plateau. The earliest evidence of human habitation in Punjab traces to the Soan Valley of the Pothohar, where Soanian culture developed between 774,000 BC and 11,700 BC. This period goes back to the first interglacial period in the second Ice Age, from which remnants of stone and flint tools have been found.

Taxila was one of the capital city of ancient Gandhāra, situated on the eastern shore of the Indus—the pivotal junction of the Indian subcontinent and Central Asia; it is first mentioned in Rigveda around 1200 BCE. Some ruins at Taxila date to the time of the Achaemenid Empire, followed successively by the Maurya Empire, the Indo-Greek Kingdom, the Indo-Scythians, and the Kushan Empire. Owing to its strategic location, Taxila has changed hands many times over the centuries, with many polities vying for its control. When the great ancient trade routes connecting these regions ceased to be important, the city sank into insignificance and was finally destroyed in the 5th century by the invading Hunas.

=== Medieval period ===
Throughout much of its history, the Pothohar Plateau was primarily dominated by the local Khokhar and Gakhar tribes. Under the chieftainship of Jasrat, the Khokhars resisted the Timurid invasion of Punjab in 1398 CE. In the 15th century, Pothohar was conquered by Malik Jasrat who had conquered most of Punjab from the Delhi Sultanate.

During the Mughal period, the Pothohar was a part of the Subah of Lahore. Sarang Khan Gakhar was the chief of the Gakhars, who was made ruler of Pothohar in 1520 by the Mughal emperor Babur for his submission to the Mughals. He died fighting Sher Shah Suri in 1543. His son Kamal Khan Gakhar later assumed the throne of Pothohar by defeating his uncle Adam Khan Gakhar in battle with help of emperor Jalaluddin Akbar. Muqarrab Khan Gakhar rose to power and became the Gakhar sultan from 1739 until 1767 succeeding his father Mu'azzam Khan.

=== Modern period ===
The Punjab played a major role in the war effort of World War II, and a large proportion of these soldiers came from the Pothohar as well as the Salt Range. In mid-19th century British India, ancient Taxila's ruins were rediscovered by British archaeologist Alexander Cunningham. In 1980, UNESCO designated Taxila as a World Heritage Site. By some accounts, the University of ancient Taxila is considered to be one of the earliest universities in the world. Because of the extensive preservation efforts and upkeep, Taxila is one of Punjab's popular tourist spots, attracting up to one million tourists every year.

== Demography ==
Punjabis are the native people of Pothohar, speaking Punjabi in forms of various dialects and Urdu. Major dialects or varieties spoken in the region include Pothwari, predominantly spoken in the northern and central areas of the plateau, with Dhanni being spoken in the southern areas, Majhi in the eastern and Hindko (specifically Ghebi and Chachhi) in the western areas. Other Punjabi dialects, as well as other languages, are also spoken in major urban centres like Islamabad and Rawalpindi.

The major biradaris of the region (Punjabi: برادری) include Maliar, Rajputs, Jats, Awans, Janjuas, Gujjars, Khokhars, and Gakhars. Prior to the partition of India, other biradaris including the Khatris, Mohyal Brahmins, and Aroras were also present in large numbers throughout the region.

== Economy ==
The plateau covers about 7 percent of all the cultivated land of Pakistan and most of it is very fertile, but the region does not have any proper irrigation system, with the agriculture being largely dependent on rainfall.

The plateau is the location of major Pakistani oil fields, the first of which were discovered at Khaur in 1915 and Dhuliān in 1935; the Tut field was discovered in 1968, Missa Keswal was discovered in 1992 and exploration continued in the area in the 1990s. The oil fields are connected by pipeline to the Attock Refinery in Rawalpindi. Major reserves of oil and gas has been discovered at Chak Beli Khan near Rawalpindi in Punjab. A major oil reserve has been discovered near Jhelum in Punjab, opening up a new area for exploitation of hydrocarbon potential (e.g., Meyal Field). With an estimated production of 5,500 barrels per day, the Ghauri X-1 oil well is expected to be the country's largest oil-producing well and is likely to start contributing its output to the system by the end of June 2014.

Due to low rain fall, extensive deforestation, coal mining, oil and gas exploration, the area is becoming devoid of vegetation.

== Important sites ==
=== Taxila ===
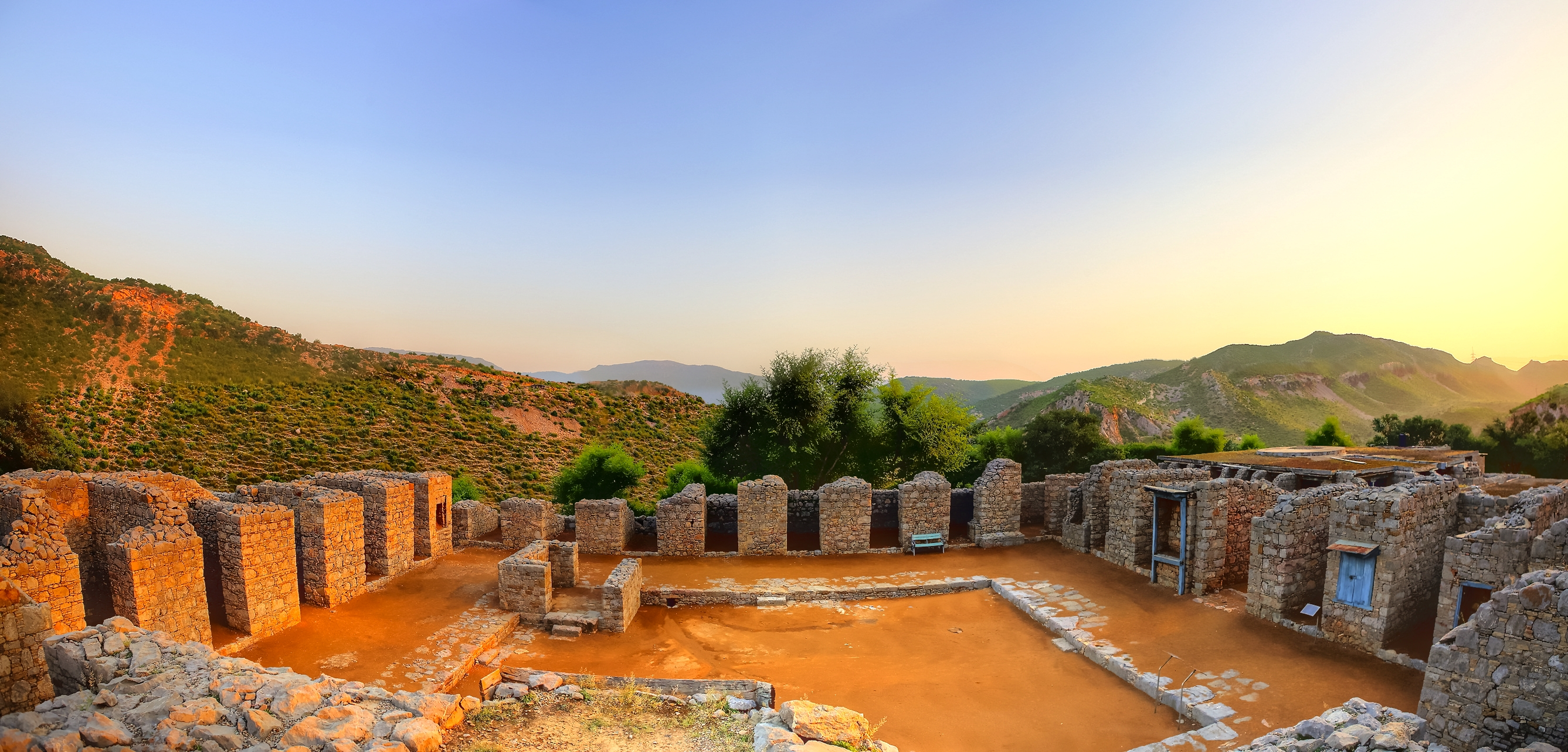
Panorama of the Jaulian monastery

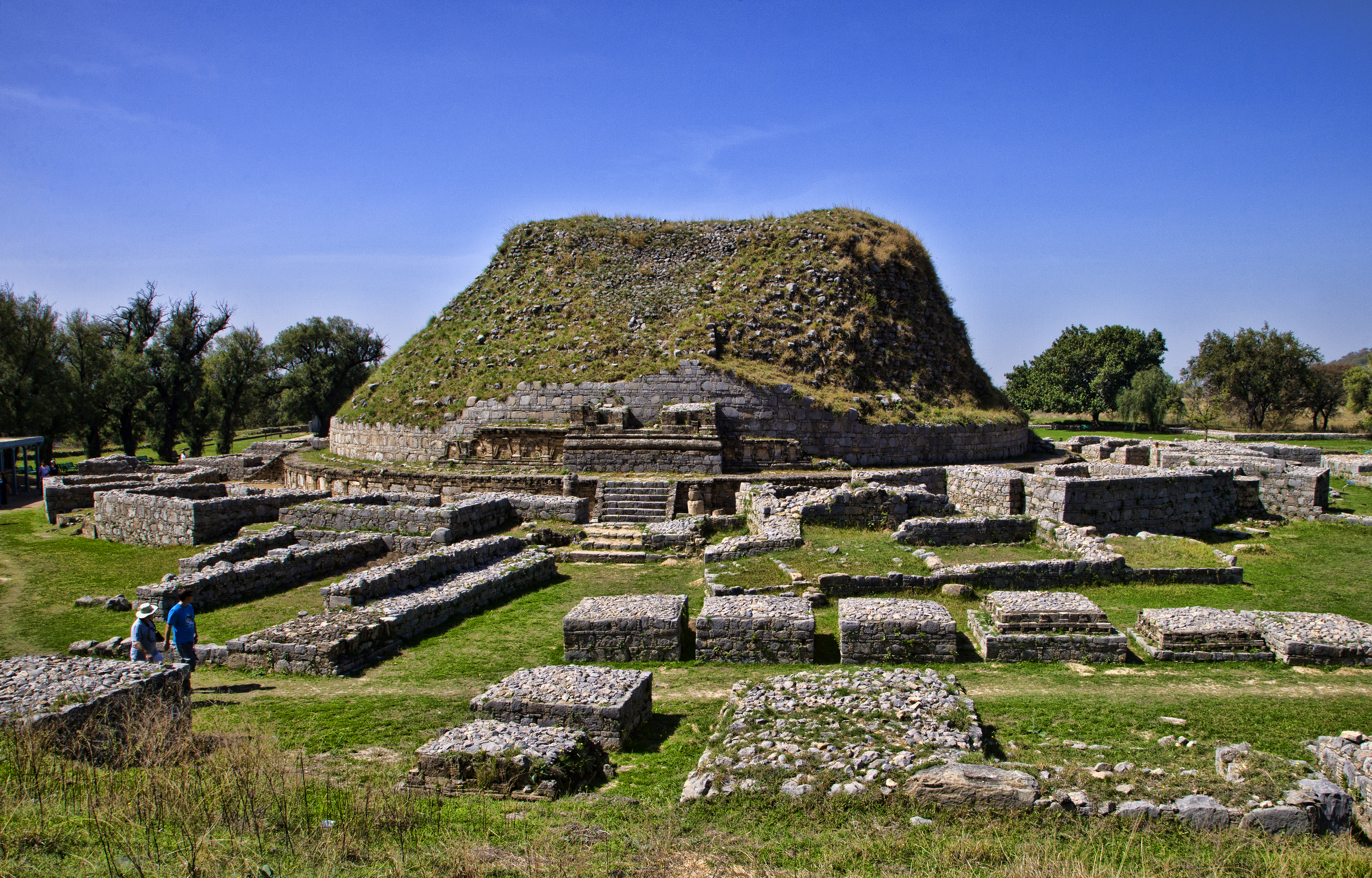
Ruins of Dharmarajika Stupa in Taxila. It was destroyed during the Hunnic invasions in the 6th century.

Taxila's archaeological sites lie near modern Taxila about 35 km (22 mi) northwest of the city of Rawalpindi. The sites were first excavated by John Marshall, who worked at Taxila over a period of twenty years from 1913.

The vast archaeological site includes neolithic remains dating to 3360 BCE, and Early Harappan remains dating to 2900–2600 BCE at Sarai Kala. Taxila, however, is most famous for ruins of several settlements, the earliest dating from around 1000 BCE. It is also known for its collection of Buddhist religious monuments, including the Dharmarajika stupa, the Jaulian monastery, and the Mohra Muradu monastery.

The main ruins of Taxila include four major cities, each belonging to a distinct time period, at three different sites. The earliest settlement at Taxila is found in the Hathial section, which yielded pottery shards that date from as early as the late 2nd millennium BCE to the 6th century BCE. The Bhir Mound ruins at the site date from the 6th century BCE, and are adjacent to Hathial. The ruins of Sirkap date to the 2nd century BCE, and were built by the region's Greco-Bactrian kings who ruled in the region following Alexander the Great's invasion of the region in 326 BCE. The third and most recent settlement is that of Sirsukh, which was built by rulers of the Kushan empire, who ruled from nearby Purushapura (modern Peshawar).

=== Rohtas Fort ===
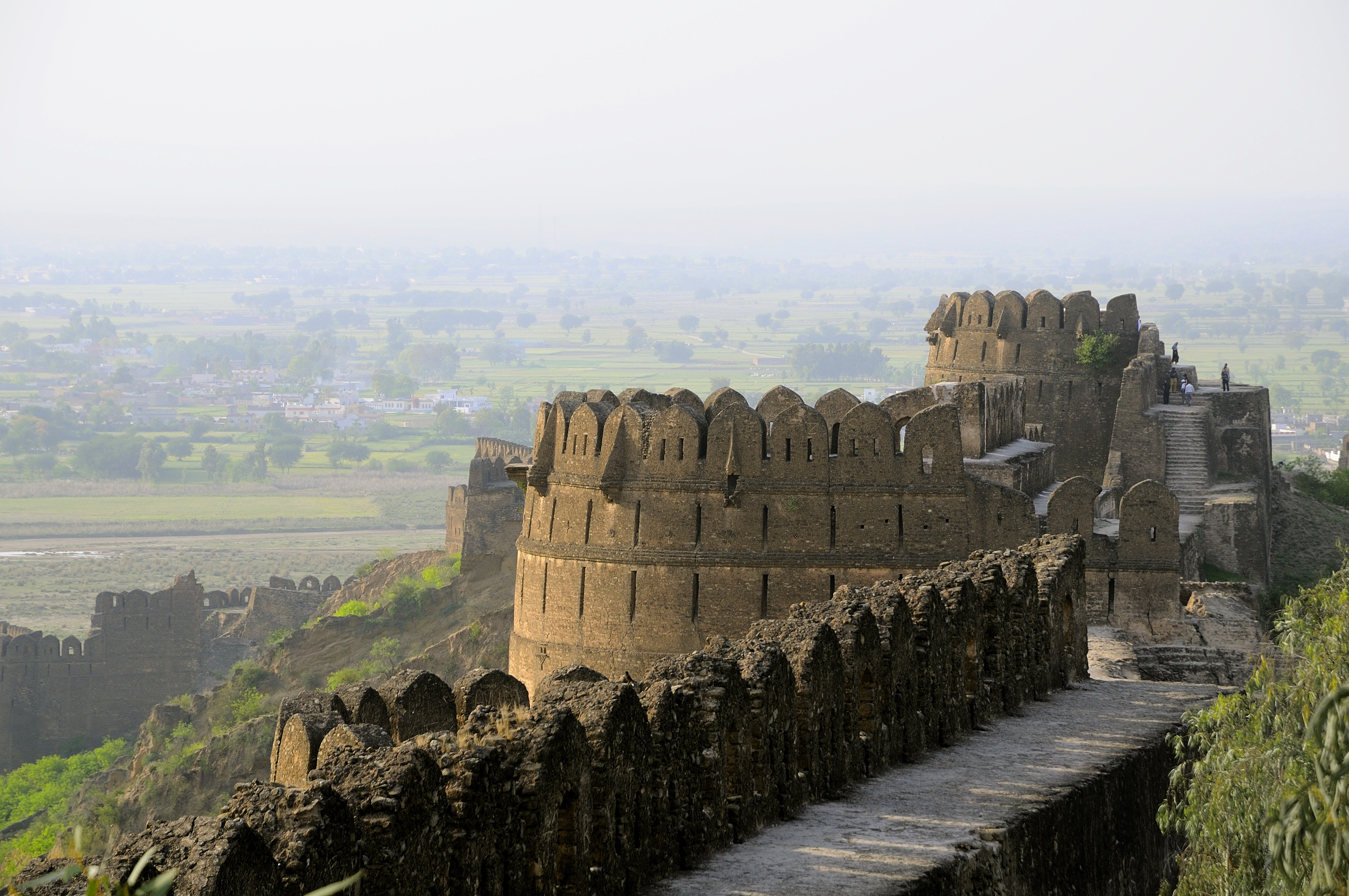
Rohtas Fort was built upon a hill overlooking the Pothohar Plateau.

Rohtas Fort is a 16th-century fortress located near the city of Jhelum in the Punjab province of Pakistan. The fort is one of the largest and most formidable in the subcontinent. Rohtas Fort was never taken by force, and it has remained remarkably intact. The fortress was built by Raja Todar Mal on the orders of Sher Shah Suri. The fort is known for its large defensive walls and several monumental gateways. Rohtas Fort was declared a UNESCO World Heritage Site in 1997, as an "exceptional example of the Muslim military architecture of Central and South Asia."

=== Katas Raj Temples ===
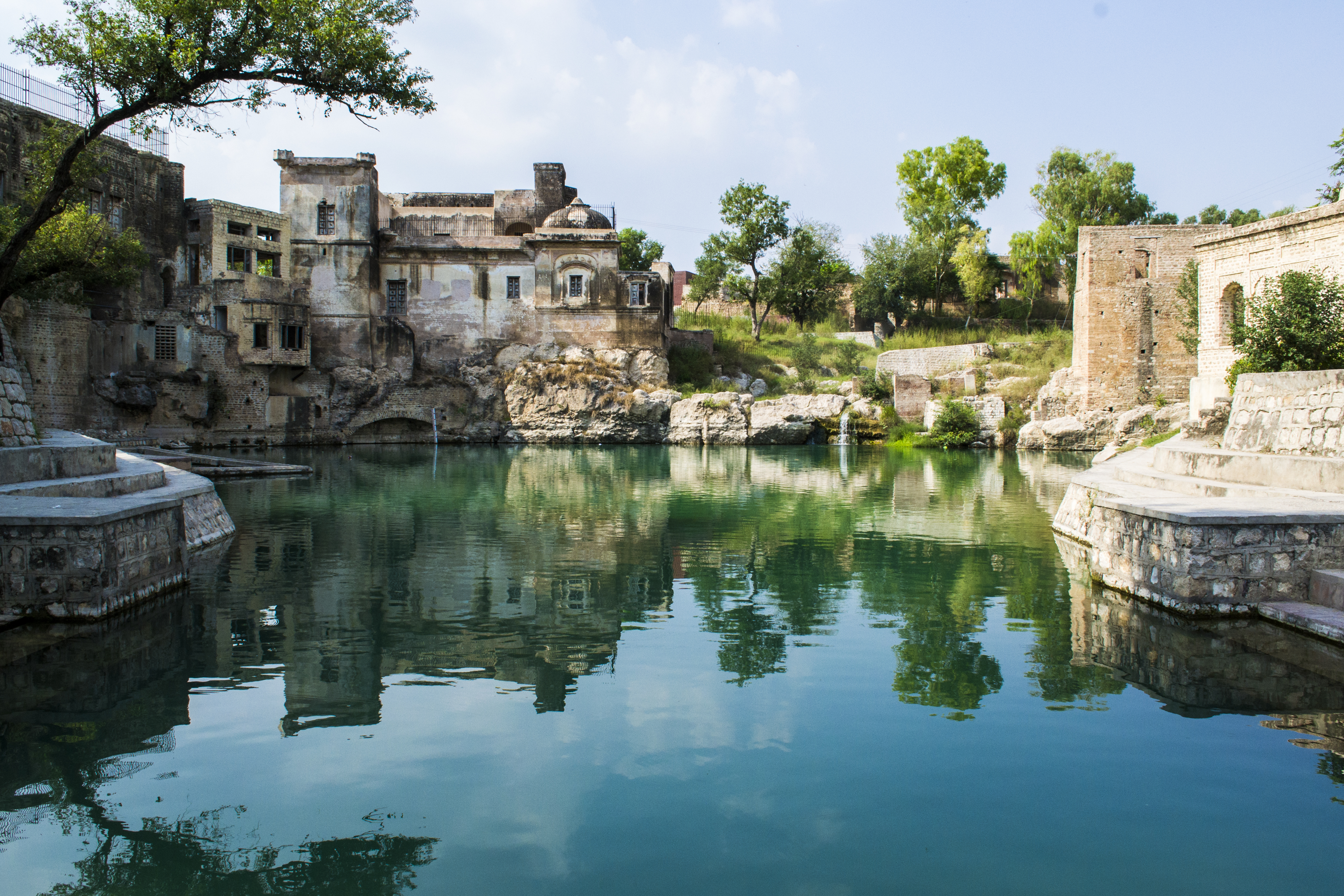
The complex consists of several temples and associated structures.

The Katas Raj Temples also known as Qila Katas, is a complex of several Hindu temples connected to one another by walkways. The temple complex surrounds a pond named Katas which is regarded as sacred by Hindus.

The temples' pond is said in the Puranas to have been created from the teardrops of Shiva, after he wandered the Earth inconsolable after the death of his wife Sati. The pond occupies an area of 1,391 m^{2} (14,970 sq ft), with a maximum depth of 6 metres.

The temples play a role in the Hindu epic poem, the Mahābhārata, where the temples are traditionally believed to have been the site where the Pandava brothers spent a significant portion of their exile.

=== Rawat Fort ===
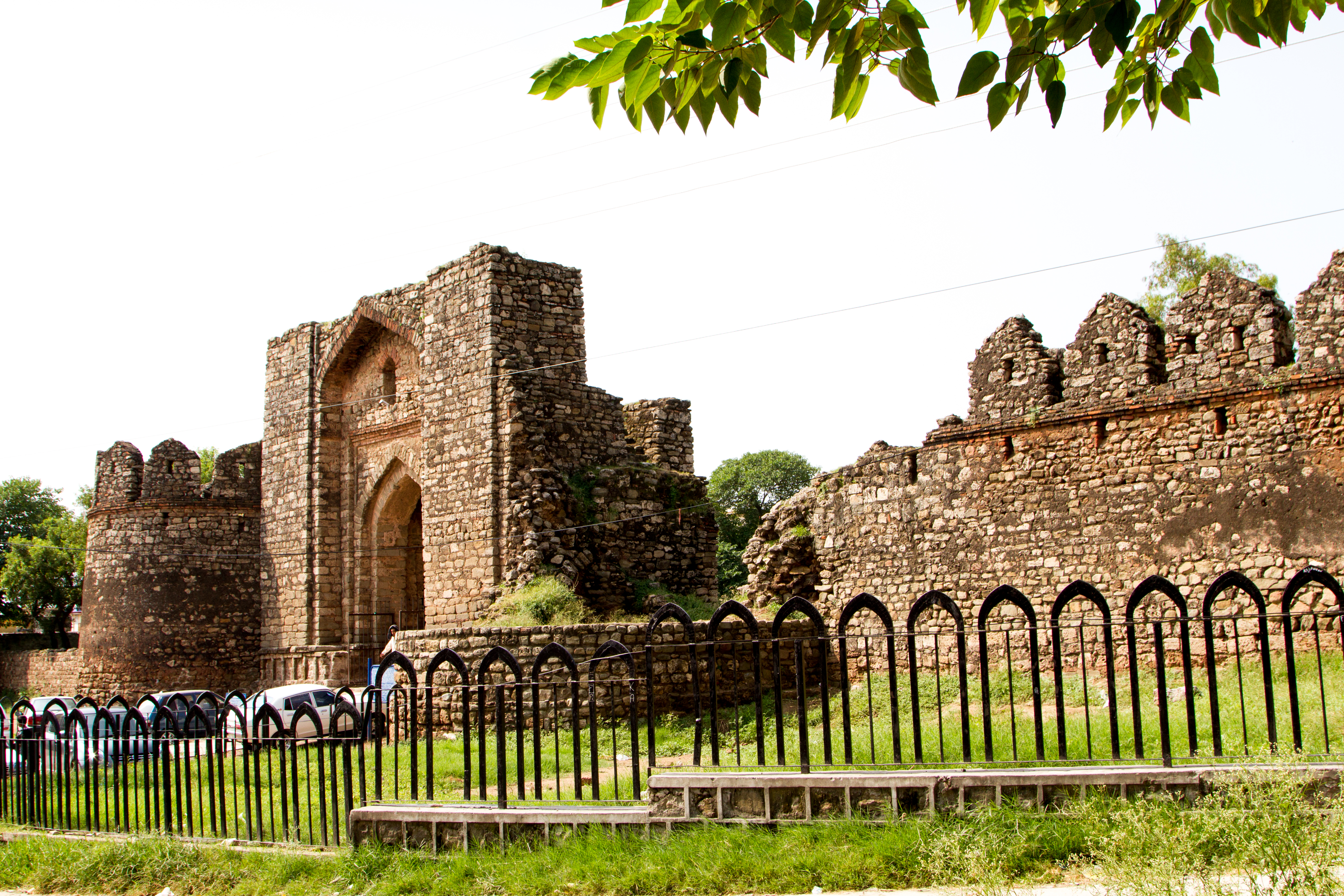
Rawat Fort

Rawat Fort is an early 16th century fort near the city of Rawalpindi. The fort was built to defend the region from the forces of the Pashtun king Sher Shah Suri.

=== Tilla Jogian ===
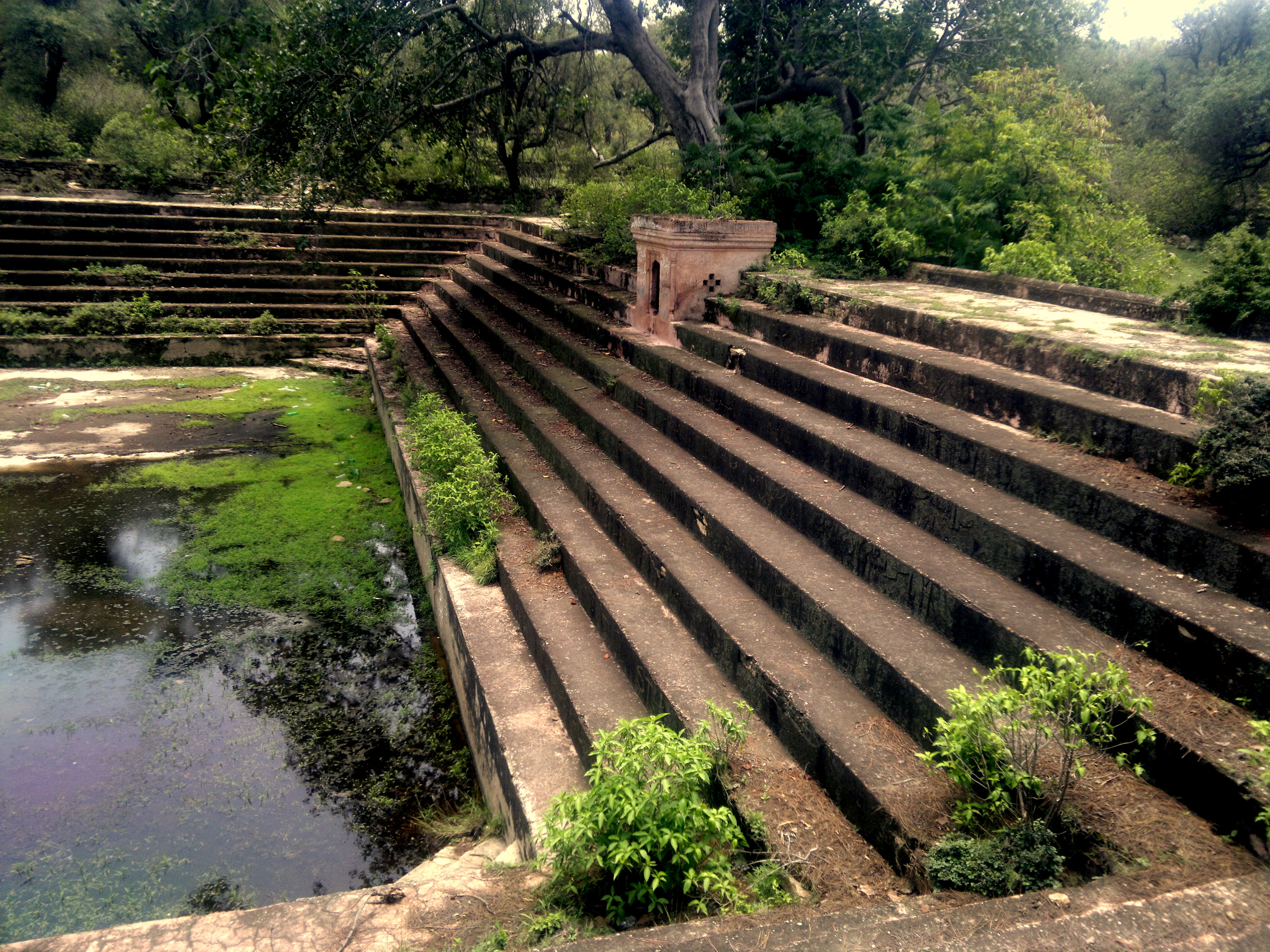
An abandoned pond at Tilla Jogian

Tilla Jogian is an abandoned Hindu temple and monastic complex located on the summit of the Tilla Jogian mountain in the Salt Range. The complex was the most important centre for Hindu jogis in Punjab prior to 1947, and had housed hundreds of ascetics. The site is also important in Sikhism for its association with the founder of the Sikh faith, Guru Nanak.

=== Khewra Salt Mine ===
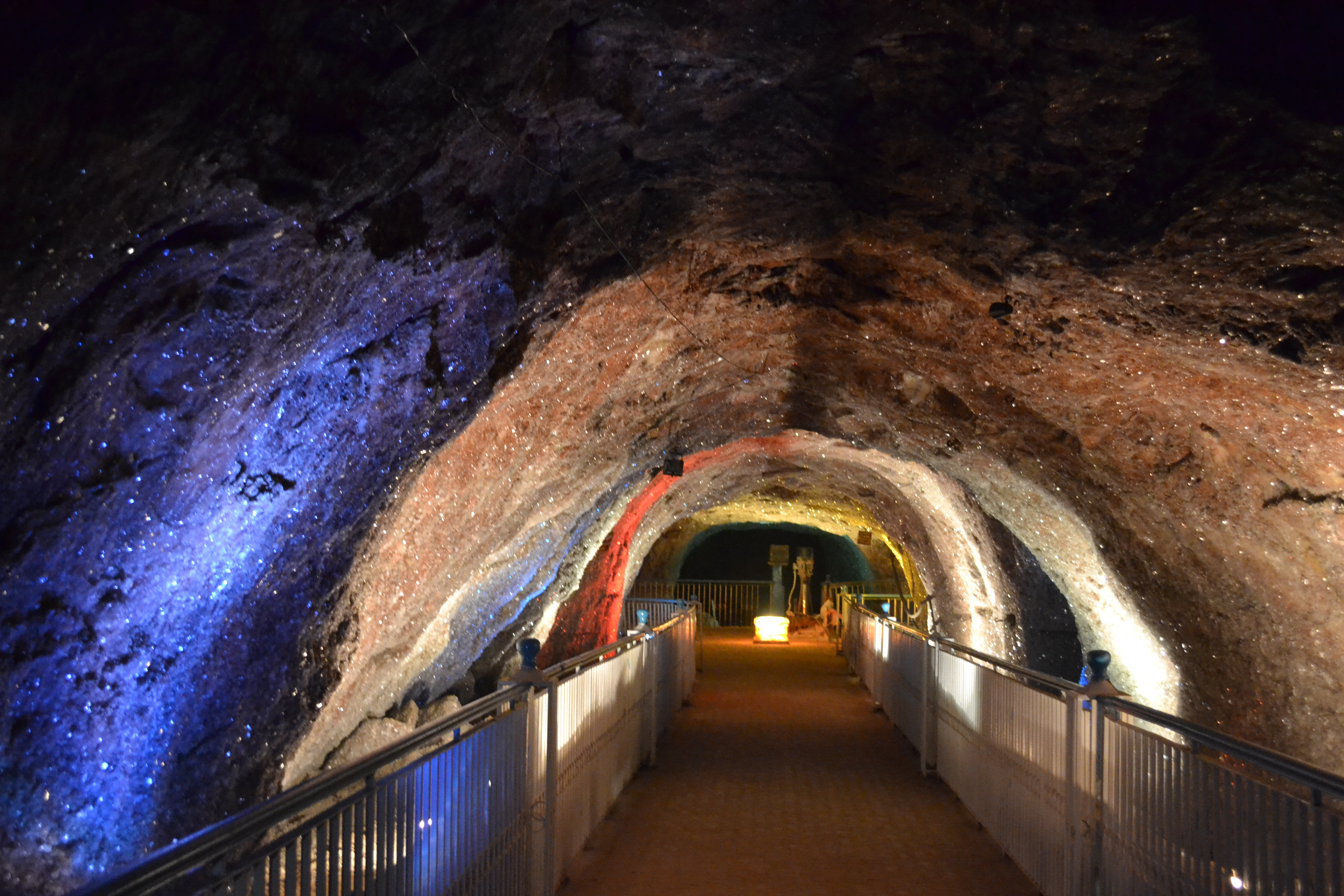
Khewra Salt Mine tunnel (Crystal Valley)

The Khewra Salt Mine in Khewra is the second largest salt mine in the world.

The mine is famous for its production of pink Khewra salt, often marketed as Himalayan salt, and is a major tourist attraction, drawing up to 250,000 visitors a year. Its history dates back to its discovery by Alexander's troops in 320 BC, but it started trading in the Mughal era.

=== Manikyala Stupa ===
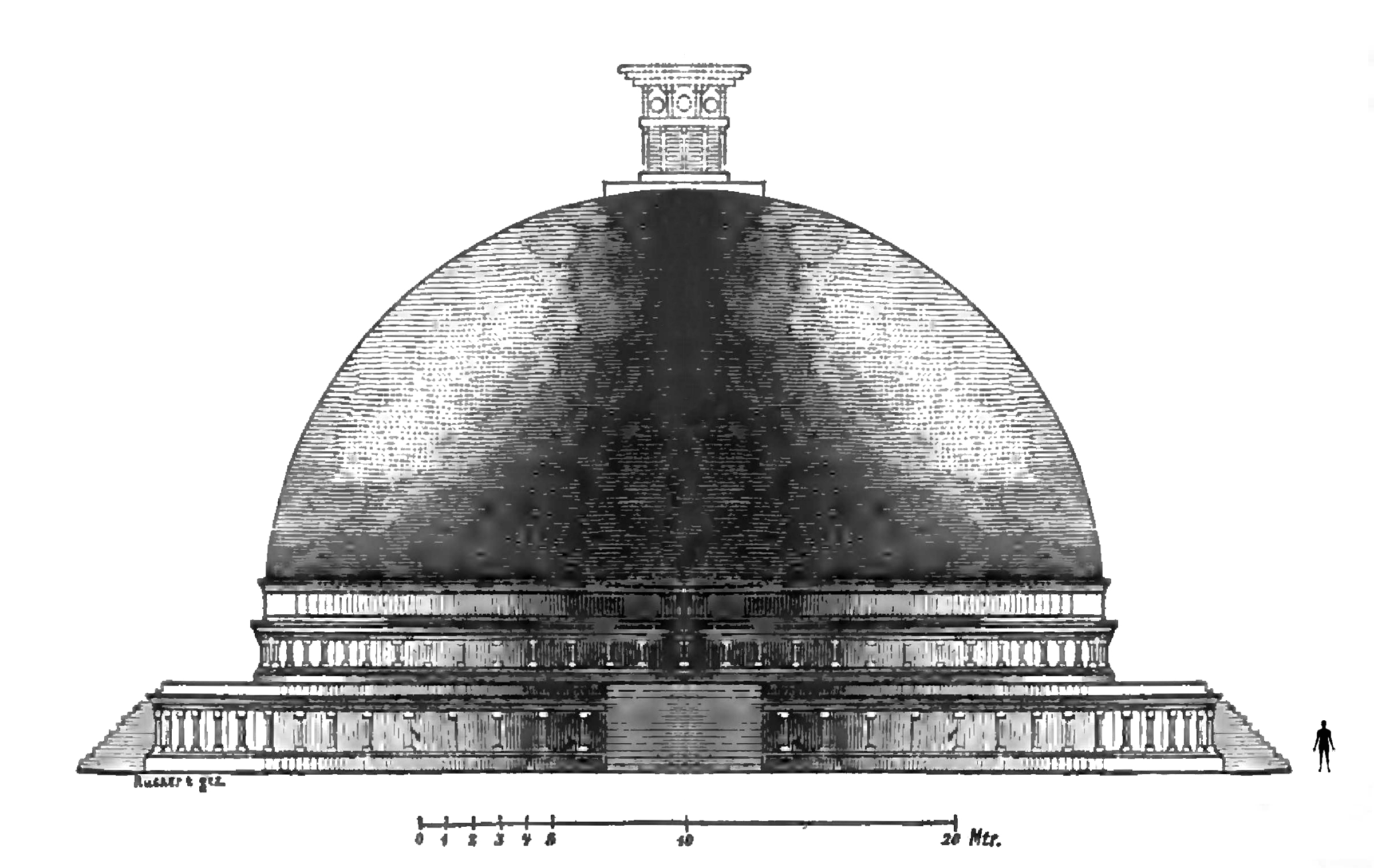
Restored view of the Manikyala Stupa

The Manikyala Stupa is a Buddhist stupa near the village of Tope Mankiala. The stupa was built to commemorate the spot, where according to the Jataka tales, an incarnation of the Buddha called Prince Sattva sacrificed himself to feed seven hungry tiger cubs.

Mankiala stupa's relic deposits were discovered by Jean-Baptiste Ventura in 1830. The relics were then removed from the site during the British Raj, and are now housed in the British Museum.

== Notable people ==
- Shaikha Khokhar - Punjabi chieftain of the Khokhar tribe
- Jasrat Khokhar - 15th Century Punjabi Muslim ruler who controlled the Potohar Plateau and some other parts of Punjab
- Hania Amir - actress
- Raja Pervaiz Ashraf - former prime minister of Pakistan
- Shoaib Akhtar - former cricketer known as "The Rawalpindi Express"
- Muhammad Amir - cricketer
- Haris Rauf - cricketer
- Raja Muhammad Sarwar Bhatti - first recipient of the Nishan-e-Haider, the highest military award of Pakistan
- Sowar Muhammad Hussain Janjua - eighth recipient of the Nishan-e-Haider
- Bari Imam - Sufi saint
- Amir Khan Janjua - former boxer
- Pir Meher Ali Shah - Punjabi Sufi scholar and poet

== See also ==
- Punjab region, and Pakistani Punjab
- Topography of Pakistan
- Mountain ranges of Pakistan
- List of Rulers of Pothohar Plateau
