= Sar Jalal =

Historic site in Punjab, Pakistan

- Interactive map of Sar Jalal
- Coordinates: 33.1650°N 73.4825°E
- Country: Pakistan
- Province: Punjab
- District: Jhelum District
- Tehsil: Sohawa Tehsil

Sar Jalal, also known as Jalal Khurd, is a historic site at Sohawa, Jhelum District in Punjab, Pakistan, containing ruins of a former caravanserai or inn located along an old stretch of the Grand Trunk Road in Pakistan. The site also contains a Mughal period stepwell, with stairs descending into it, constructed to serve the army beside the old Grand Trunk Road. Jalal Khan Gakhar, a local chief of Gakhars constructed the tank (Sar) to be called Sar Jalal in his name. It also has a mosque dating back to the 17th century, built by Rani Mango, a noble woman from Janjua clan who ruled the territory after the death of her Gakhar husband.

== See also ==
- Katas Raj Temples
- Manikyala Stupa
- Pharwala Fort
- Rawat Fort
- Rohtas Fort
