= Kamal Khan Gakhar =

Gakhar chief from 1562 to 1566

Kamal Khan Gakhar کمال خان گکھڑ
- Sardār
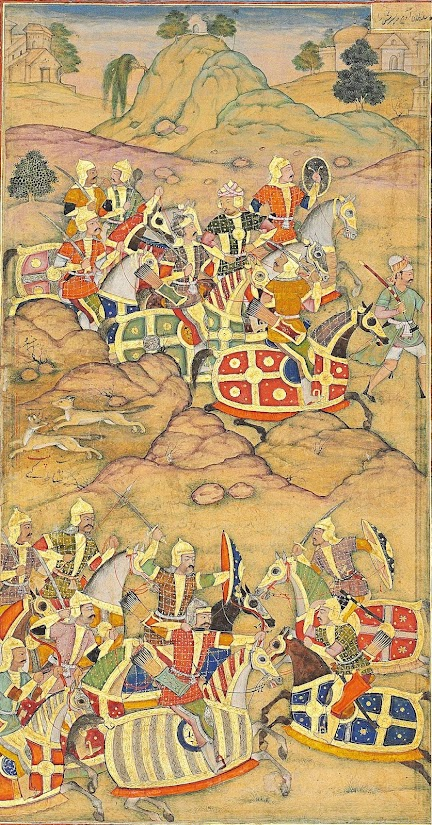
- Kamal Khan defeats Sultan Adam Khan Gakhar to take the throne

Gakhar chief
- Reign: 1562 – 1566
- Predecessor: Adam Khan Gakhar
- Successor: Said Khan Gakhar
- Died: 1566
Names
- Kamal Gakhar putr Sarang Gakhar کمال گکھڑ پتر سارنگ گکھڑ
- Father: Sarang Gakhar
- Religion: Sunni Islam

Kamal Khan Gakhar (Punjabi: کمال خان گکھڑ) was the chief of Gakhar clan and a Mughal general from 1562 to 1566. He assumed the chieftainship by defeating his uncle Adam Khan in battle with help of the Mughal Emperor Akbar.

== Early life ==
His father was Sarang Khan who was famous for resisting the Suris, losing his life in the struggle. Sultan Sarang was the younger brother of Adam Khan, and both were sons of Tatar Khan, who had earlier headed the Gakhar tribe. After Tatar's death, Sultan Sarang obtained the chiefship. During the reign of the Sur rulers, Sultan Sarang engaged in repeated conflicts with Sher Shah Suri and later Salim Shah Suri, fighting with persistence and inflicting losses on Afghan forces. Sher Shah, seeking to curb Gakhar resistance, founded the Rohtas Fort, intended to control the Gakhar country. Eventually, Sultan Sarang was captured and put to death. Following his father's execution, Kamal Khan was imprisoned in the Gwalior Fort. The Sur rulers failed to bring the Gakhar territory under full control, and the chiefship passed to Adam Khan.

== Tenure ==
After Humayun retook his throne, Kamal Khan was released and returned to his homeland. However, his uncle Adam Khan had consolidated authority, while Kamal Khan, along with his brother Saʿid Khan, awaited for an opportunity to reassert his claim.

=== Service under Akbar ===
At the beginning of Emperor Akbar's reign, Kamal Khan travelled to Jalandhar and entered Mughal service, where he was appointed as an officer. He took part in imperial campaigns, including operations connected with the defeat of Hemu and engagements at Mankot, and earned favour through his conduct in battle. In the third regnal year of Akbar, Kamal Khan was dispatched with a suitable force to suppress disturbances caused by the Miyana Afghans in Sironj, in the province of Malwa. He successfully carried out this assignment and was rewarded with jagirs, including the towns of Karra and Fatehpur Hanswa. In the sixth regnal year, he participated in a campaign against a rival claimant raised by Afghan elements, fighting alongside imperial commanders. Chroniclers note that Akbar praised his performance and expressed his intention to reward him further.

=== Conflict with Sultan Adam and restoration of chiefship ===
In 970 AH (1562 to 1563 CE) Kamal Khan appeared at the Mughal court and petitioned for the restoration of his father's lands including the Rawat Fort, which he claimed had been unlawfully seized by his uncle Adam Khan. Akbar responded by ordering the Mughal officers in Punjab to divide the Gakhar territory into two portions, one for Adam Khan and the other for Kamal Khan, and to punish any refusal to comply.

Sultan Adam and his son Lashkari Khan Gakhar, who managed his affairs, rejected the imperial order. As a result, Mughal forces, accompanied by Kamal Khan, entered the Gakhar territory and fought a major engagement at the township of Hilan. Sultan Adam was captured, while Lashkari fled towards the hills of Kahuta before also being taken prisoner.

Following this campaign, the entire Gakhar territory was subdued and placed under Kamal Khan’s control. Lashkari was executed, while Adam Khan was kept in confinement until his death.

== Rank and death ==
According to the Akbarnama and other Mughal records, Kamal Khan attained a mansab of six thousand. The same sources state that he died in 970 AH (1562 to 1563 CE), the very year in which he achieved his final success and restoration. Some uncertainty surrounds the precise circumstances of his death, and Mughal chroniclers themselves note the limits of certainty regarding the events of his final year.
