= Mohra Nagrial =

موہڑہ ناگڑیال
- Town
- Mohra Nagrial
- Location within Pakistan
- Coordinates: 33.23°N 73.29°E
- Country: Pakistan
- Province: (Islamabad Capital Territory) Islamabad C.T
- Elevation: 489 m (1,604 ft)
- Time zone: UTC+5 (PST)

Mohra Nagrial is a town in the Islamabad Capital Territory of Pakistan. It is located at 33° 23' 45N 73° 29' 20E with an altitude of 489 metres (1607 feet). The village is named after the Nagrial tribe of Rajputs, who make up the majority of the population. It is located in the Pothohar Plateau.
