= Topography of Pakistan =

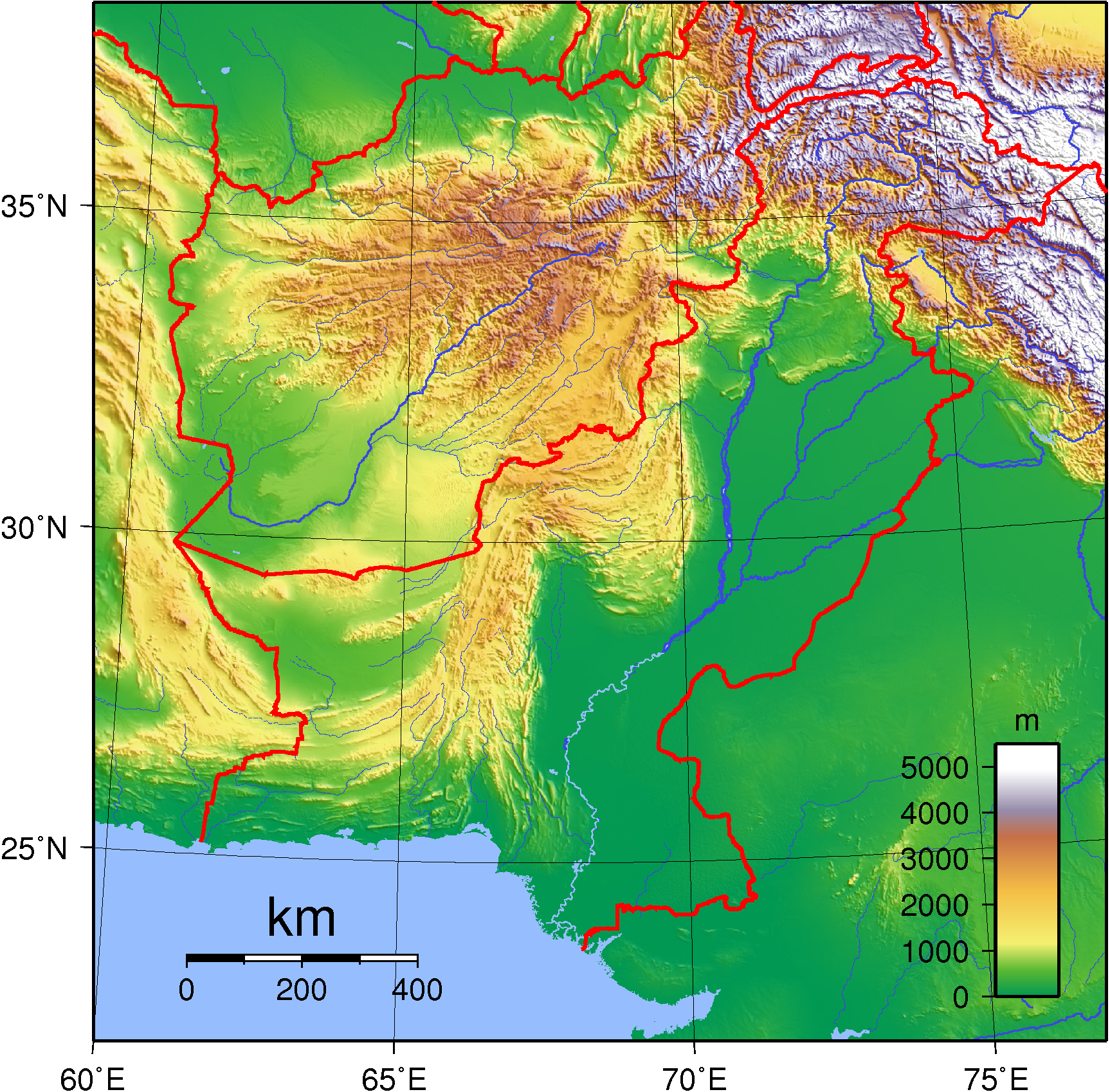
Topography of Pakistan

The topography of Pakistan is divided into seven geographic areas: the northern highlands, the Indus River plain, the desert areas, the Pothohar Plateau, Balochistan Plateau, Salt Range, and the Sistan Basin. All the rivers of Pakistan, i.e. Sindh, Ravi River, Chenab River, Jhelum River, and Sutlej River, originate from the Himalayas mountain range. Some geographers designate Plateau as to the west of the imaginary southwest line; and the Indus Plain lies to the east of that line.

== Elevation extremes ==
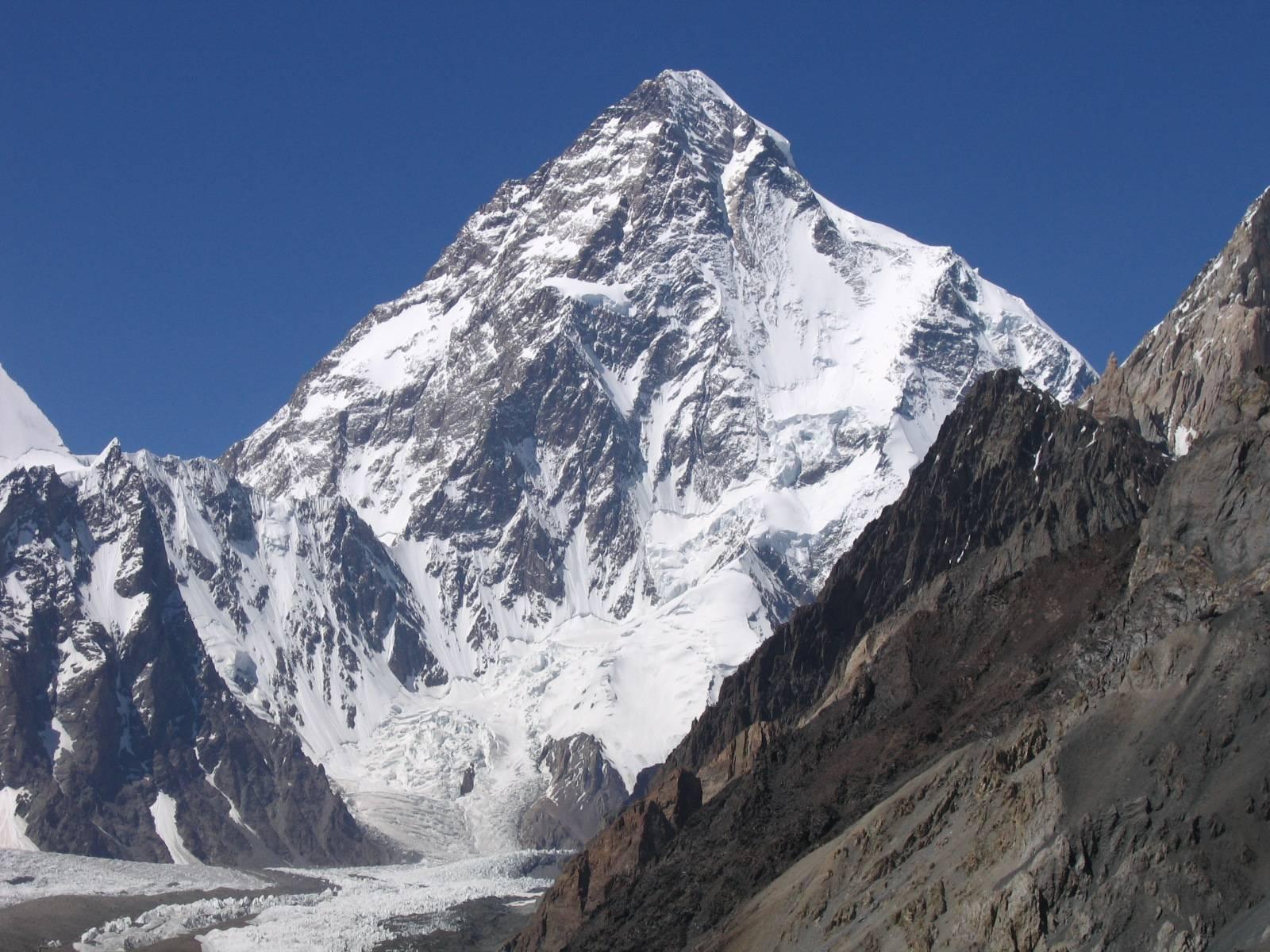
K2 Peak

Lowest point: Sea level
Highest point: K2 (Mt. Godwin-Austen) 8,611 m

== Mountains ==
In the north, northeast and north-west of Pakistan there are three ranges of mountains. Between these ranges of the Himalayas is an area the people of Central and South Asia consider to be the roof of the world. The Himalayas stretch continuously for about 2500 km from east to west. They are bounded to the north-west by the Hindu Kush mountain range and to the north by the Karakoram. Thus there are three mountain ranges in northern Pakistan: Karakoram, Himalayas and Hindu Kush. The contrast between these ranges is geologically interesting.

== The Indus Plain ==
Land between two rivers is called DOAB in the local language. The name Indus comes from the Sanskrit word "sindhu", meaning "ocean", from which also come the words Sindh, Hindu, and India. The Indus River, one of the great rivers of the world, rises in southwestern Tibet, only about 160 kilometers west of the source of the Sutlej River, which joins the Indus in Punjab, and the Brahmaputra, which runs eastward before turning southwest and flowing through Bangladesh. The catchment area of the Indus is estimated at almost 1 million square kilometers, and all of Pakistan's major rivers (the Kabul River, Jhelum, Chenab, Ravi, and Sutlej) flow into it. The Indus River basin is a large, fertile alluvial plain formed by silt from the Indus. This area has been inhabited by agricultural civilizations for at least 5,000 years.

The upper Indus Basin includes Punjab; the lower Indus Basin begins at the Panjnad River (the confluence of the eastern tributaries of the Indus) and extends south to the coast. Punjab means the "land of five waters": the Indus, Jhelum, Chenab, Ravi, and Sutlej rivers. The Sutlej river, however, is mostly on the Indian side of the border.

In the southern part of the province of Punjab, the British attempted to harness the irrigation power of the water over 100 years ago when they established what came to be known as the Canal Colonies. The irrigation project, which facilitated the emergence of intensive cultivation despite semi-arid conditions, resulted in important social and political transformations.

Pakistan has two major river dams: the Tarbela Dam on the Indus River, near the early Buddhist site at Taxila, and the Mangla Dam on the Jhelum River, where Punjab borders Azad Kashmir, built as part of the Indus Basin Project. The Warsak Dam on the Kabul River near Peshawar is smaller. These dams, along with a series of headworks and barrages built by the British and expanded since the independence of Pakistan in 1947, are of vital importance to the national economy and played an important role in calming the raging floodwaters of 1992, which devastated large areas in the northern highlands and the Punjab plains.

== The Desert areas ==
=== Cholistan Desert ===
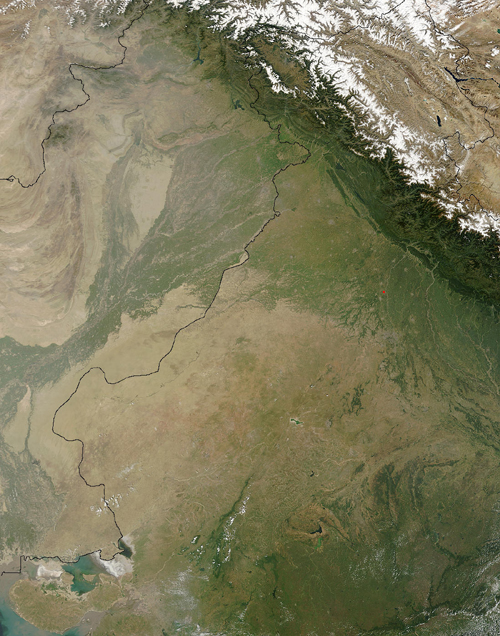
Thar Desert satellite imagery

The Cholistan Desert spans an area of 16,000 square kilometers. The name "Cholistan" is derived from the Turkish word "chol," meaning "desert," though the desert is locally known as Rohi. The desert hosts an annual jeep rally, which draws many tourists.

=== Indus Valley Desert ===
The Indus Valley Desert is located in the northern area of Pakistan. The desert spans an area of 19500 square kilometers and is surrounded by northwestern scrub forests. The Indus Valley Desert lies between two major rivers in the region, the Chenab and the Indus.

=== Kharan Desert ===
The Kharan Desert is located in Northeast Balochistan (a Pakistani state). The desert was used for nuclear testing by the Pakistan military, making it the most famous of the five deserts. The desert is in the center of a large empty basin.

=== Thal Desert ===
The Thal Desert is located in northeastern Pakistan between the Indus and Jhelum rivers. A large canal-building project is currently underway to irrigate the land. Irrigation will make most of the desert suitable for farming.

=== Thar Desert ===
The Thar Desert spans 264,091 km^{2} (101,966 sq mi) and covers large areas of both Pakistan and India. It is the seventeenth largest desert on the planet and the third largest in Asia.

== Potohar Plateau ==
Tilla Jogian, second highest peak in Potwar The Potwar Plateau (also Potowar or Potohar) is a plateau in the province of Punjab, Pakistan and the western parts of Pakistan administered Kashmir. The area was the home of the Soanian Culture, which is evidenced by the discovery of fossils, tools, coins, and remains of ancient archaeological sites. The local people speak the Potwari language. Pothohar Plateau is bounded on the east by the Jhelum River, on the west by the Indus River, on the north by the Kala Chitta Range and the Margalla Hills, and on the south by the Salt Range.

=== Balochistan Plateau ===
The Balochistan plateau is located in the south-west of Pakistan with altitudes mainly ranging from 600 to 3010 metres. This is an extensive area of 347,190 km^{2} with a number of distinct natural topographical and drainage features that can be identified as follows: ▪ Basins of Northern Balochistan ▪ Basins of Western Balochistan ▪ Mountain ranges ▪ Coastal areas

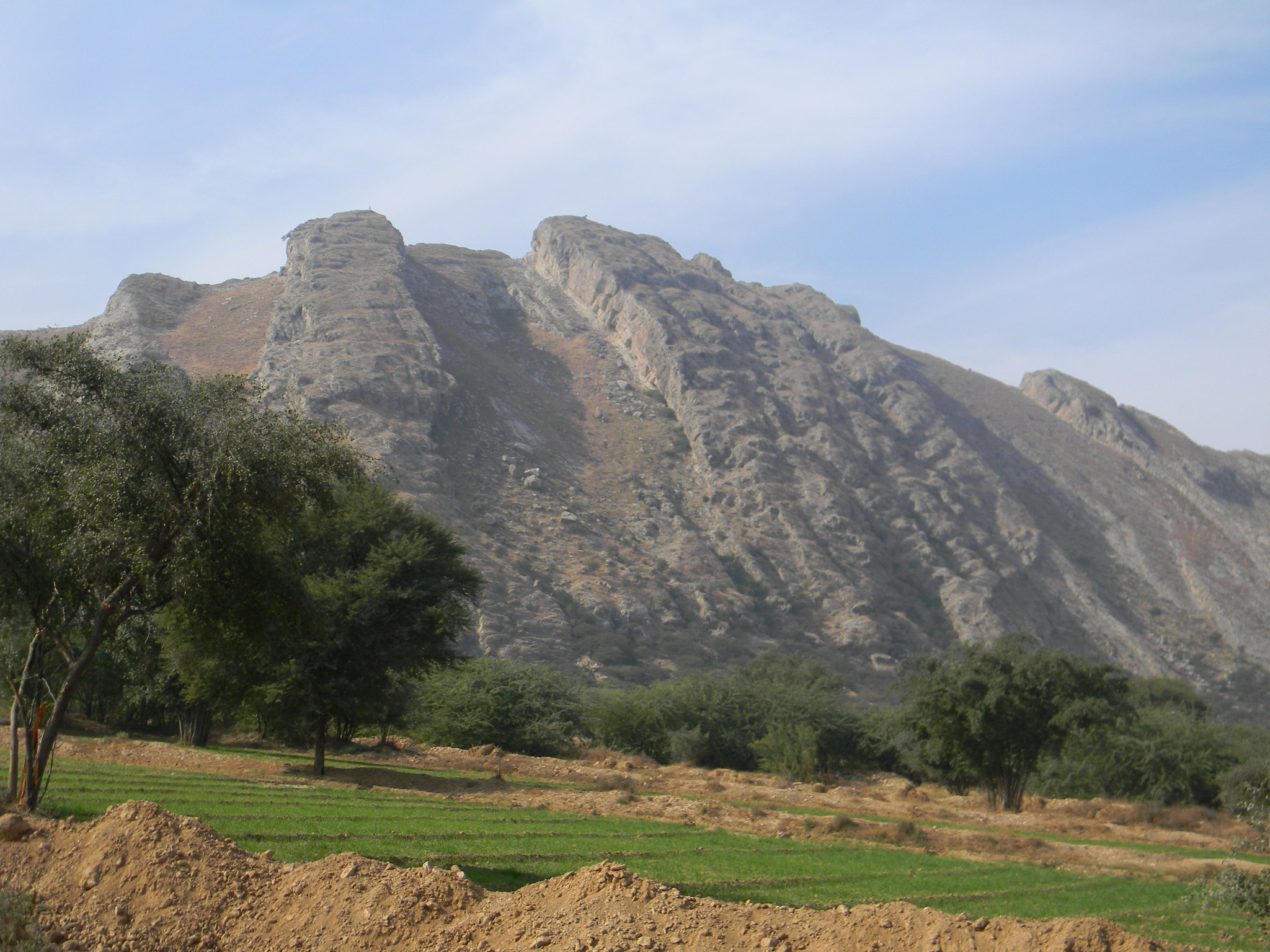
Salt Range in District Minawali Punjab Pakistan

=== Salt Range ===
The Salt Range is a hill system in the Punjab province of Pakistan, deriving its name from its extensive deposits of rock salt. The range extends from the Jhelum River to the Indus, across the northern portion of the Punjab province. The Salt Range contains the great mines of Mayo, Khewra Salt Mine, Warcha and Kalabagh, which yield vast supplies of salt. Coal of a medium quality is also found. It is believed that the Salt Range was founded by the horses of Alexander the Great's army.The average altitude of Potohar platue is 300m-600m

== Sistan Basin ==
Balochistan is located at the eastern edge of the Iranian plateau and in the border region between Southwest, Central, and South Asia. It is geographically the largest of Pakistan's four provinces, at 347,190 km^{2} or 134,051 square miles, and composes 48% of the total land area of Pakistan. The population density is very low due to the mountainous terrain and scarcity of water. The southern region is known as Makran. The central region is known as Kalat. The Sulaiman Mountains dominate the northeast corner, and the Bolan Pass is a natural route into Afghanistan towards Kandahar. Much of the province south of the Quetta region is sparse desert terrain with pockets of inhabitable land, mostly near rivers and streams. The largest desert is the Kharan Desert which occupies the most of Kharan District.

This area is subject to frequent seismic disturbances because the tectonic plate under the Indian Plate collides with the Eurasian Plate as it continues to move northward and to push the Himalayas ever higher. The region surrounding Quetta is highly prone to earthquakes. A severe quake in 1931 was followed by an even more destructive one in 1935. The small city of Quetta was almost completely destroyed, and the adjacent military cantonment was heavily damaged. At least 20,000 people were killed. Tremors continue in the vicinity of Quetta; the most recent major earthquake occurred in October 2008. In January 1991 a severe earthquake destroyed entire villages in the Khyber-Pakhtunkhwa, but far fewer people were killed in the quake than died in 1935. A major earthquake centred in the Khyber-Pakhtunkhwa's Kohistan District in 1965 also caused heavy damage.
