= Rawat Fort =

15th-century fortified caravanserai in Pakistan

Rawat Fort قلعہ روات
- Rawat, Pakistan
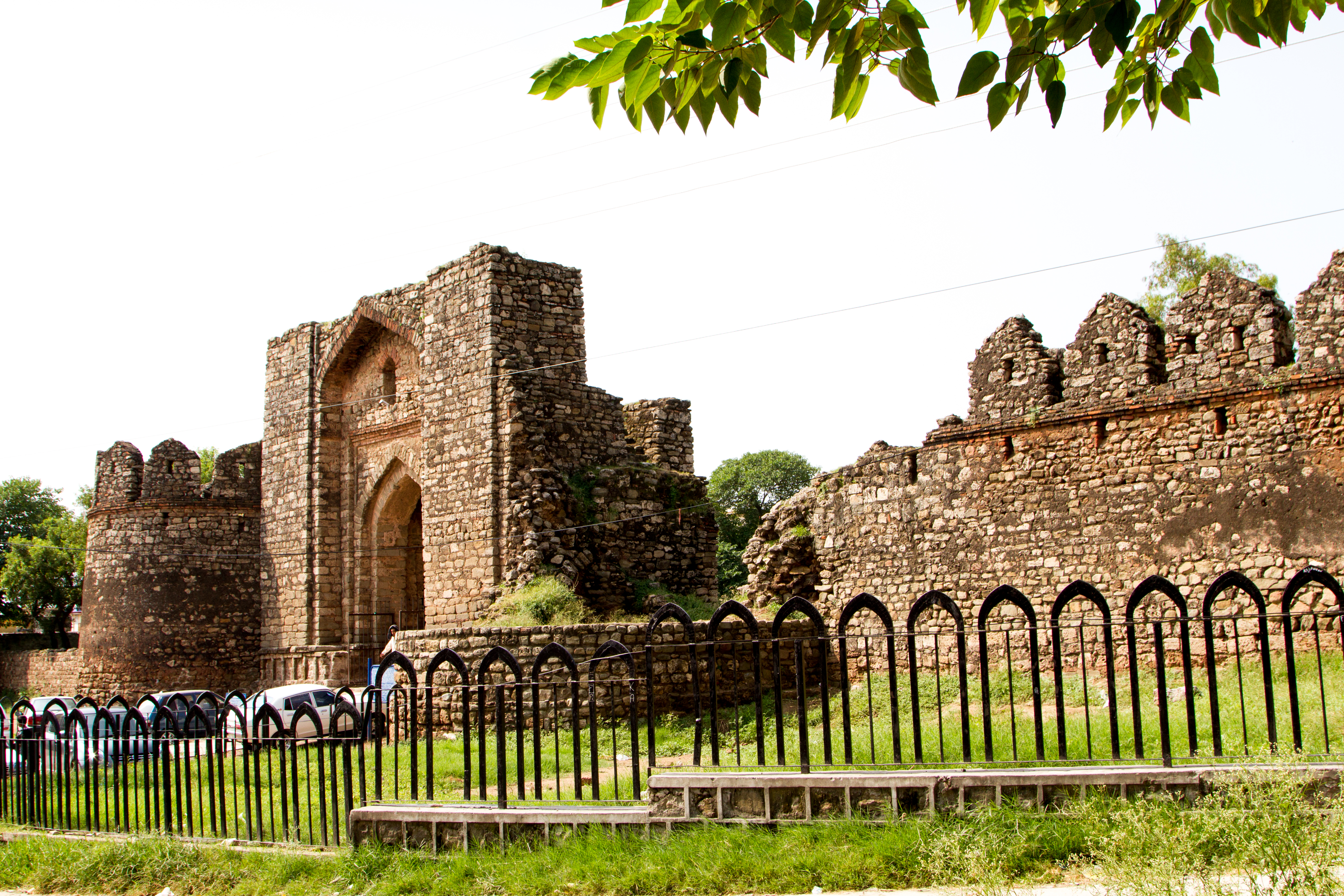
- A view of the fort's main entrance

Site information
- Type: Fortified caravanserai

Location
- Location within Pakistan
- Location within Pakistan
- Coordinates: 33.4981°N 73.1942°E

Rawat Fort (Urdu: قلعہ روات), also known as Sarai Rawat, is an early 15th century fortified caravanserai in the Pothohar Plateau, near the city of Rawalpindi in the province of Punjab.

== Location ==
It is 17 km east of Rawalpindi on Grand Trunk Road. The 2nd-century CE Manikyala Stupa can be viewed from the fort. It is located approximately 50 miles from the vast Rohtas Fort, which was built by Sher Shah Suri to subdue the Gakhars and bring the Pothohar region under his control.

== Etymology ==
Rawat Fort derives its name from the Arabic word rabat (Arabic: رباط), meaning 'caravanserai', an inn for caravans.

== History ==
The Rawat fort or sarai is believed to have been founded as a caravanserai in the 15th century by the Delhi Sultanate. It was later converted into a fortress in the 16th century by the local Gakhar clan in order to defend Pothohar from Sher Shah Suri's forces. It remained under Gakhar control during and after Mughal rule until it was taken over by the Sikh Empire, followed by the British.

== Layout ==
The fort is in an almost square form and has two gates. It measures 93.5 x 106.3 m and covers a courtyard of around 10,000 m^{2} (2.5 acres). There is an octagonal tomb with a dome measuring 16.6 m in diameter in the fort's inner portion — an area which also contains many graves. The tomb is traditionally attributed to Sarang Khan Gakhar, while graves to be of his associates who died fighting along with him against Sher Shah in 1541. Along the perimeter are a series of small cells, which may have originally been small rooms rented out to itinerant merchants. The west wall of fort contains a mosque with three domes, measuring 29.5 x 12.1 m.

== Conservation ==
The fort is federally protected as a Cultural Heritage Site of Punjab, and is managed by the Ministry of Information, Broadcasting and National Heritage. In November 2016, a conservation plan was commissioned for preservation of the fort. 50 million rupees were allocated in March 2017 towards the first of two phases of conservation of the Rawat Fort.

== Gallery ==
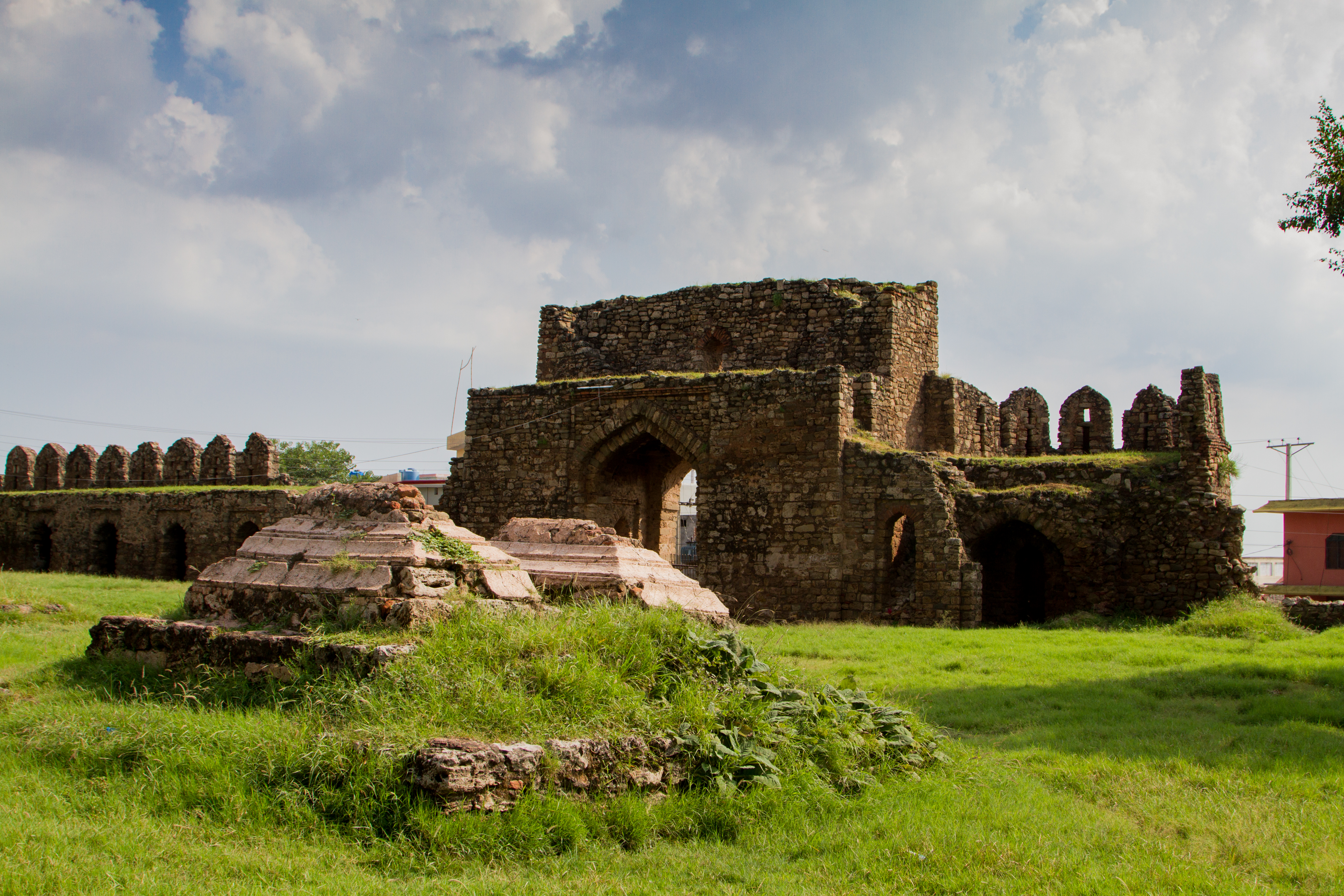
The caravanserai's eastern gate

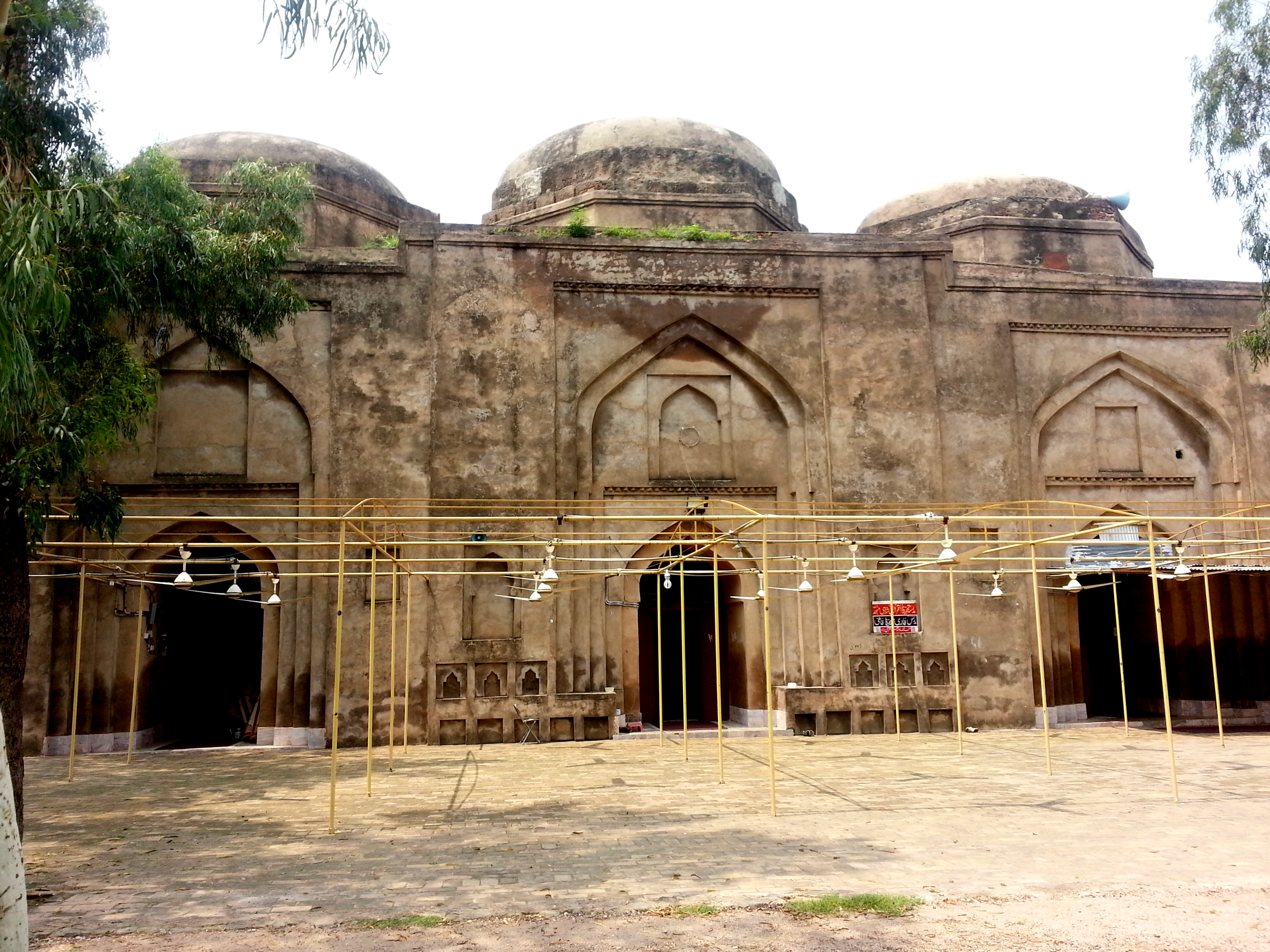
A view of the fort's mosque

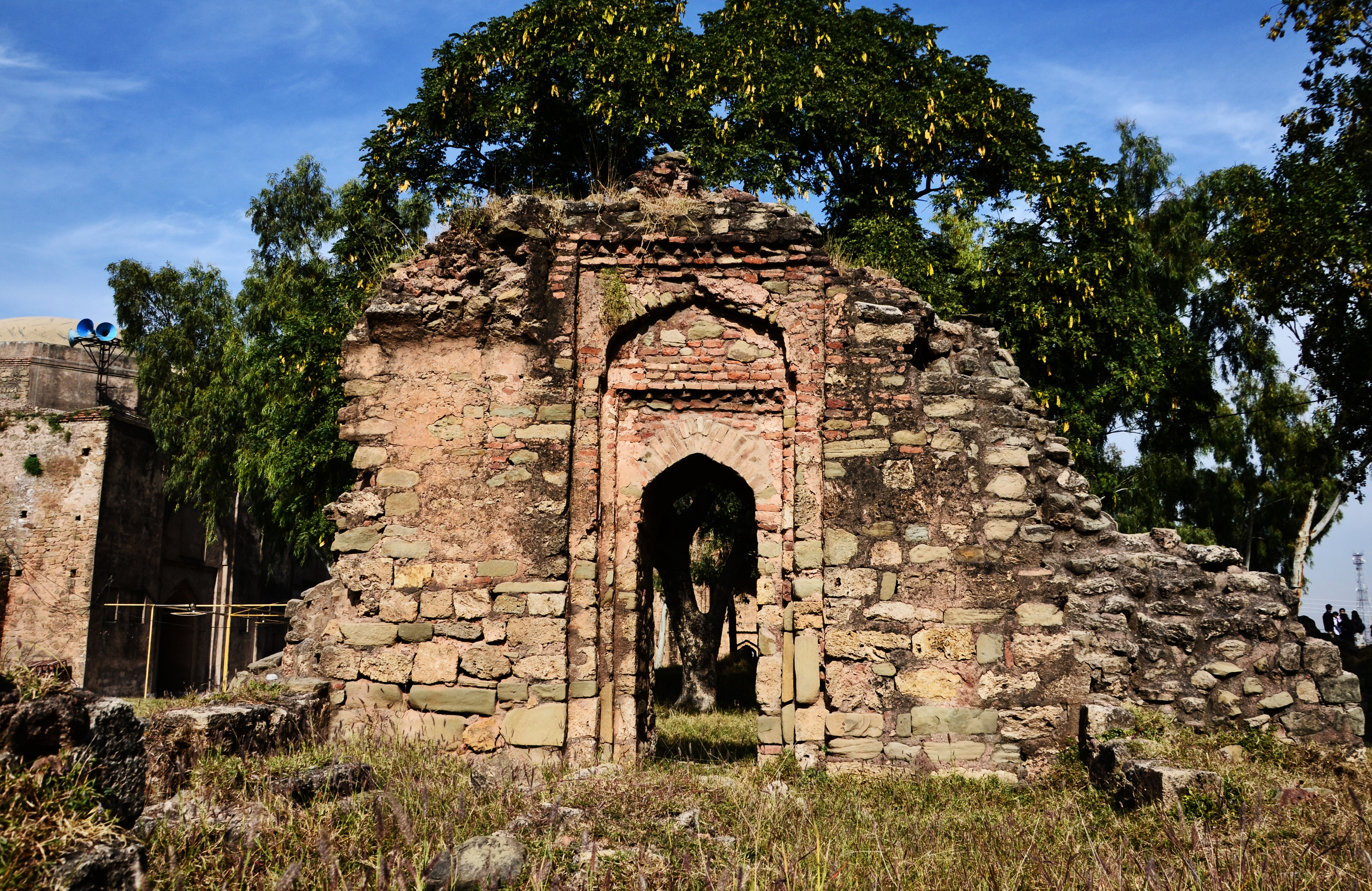
Parts of the fort are in a poor state of conservation

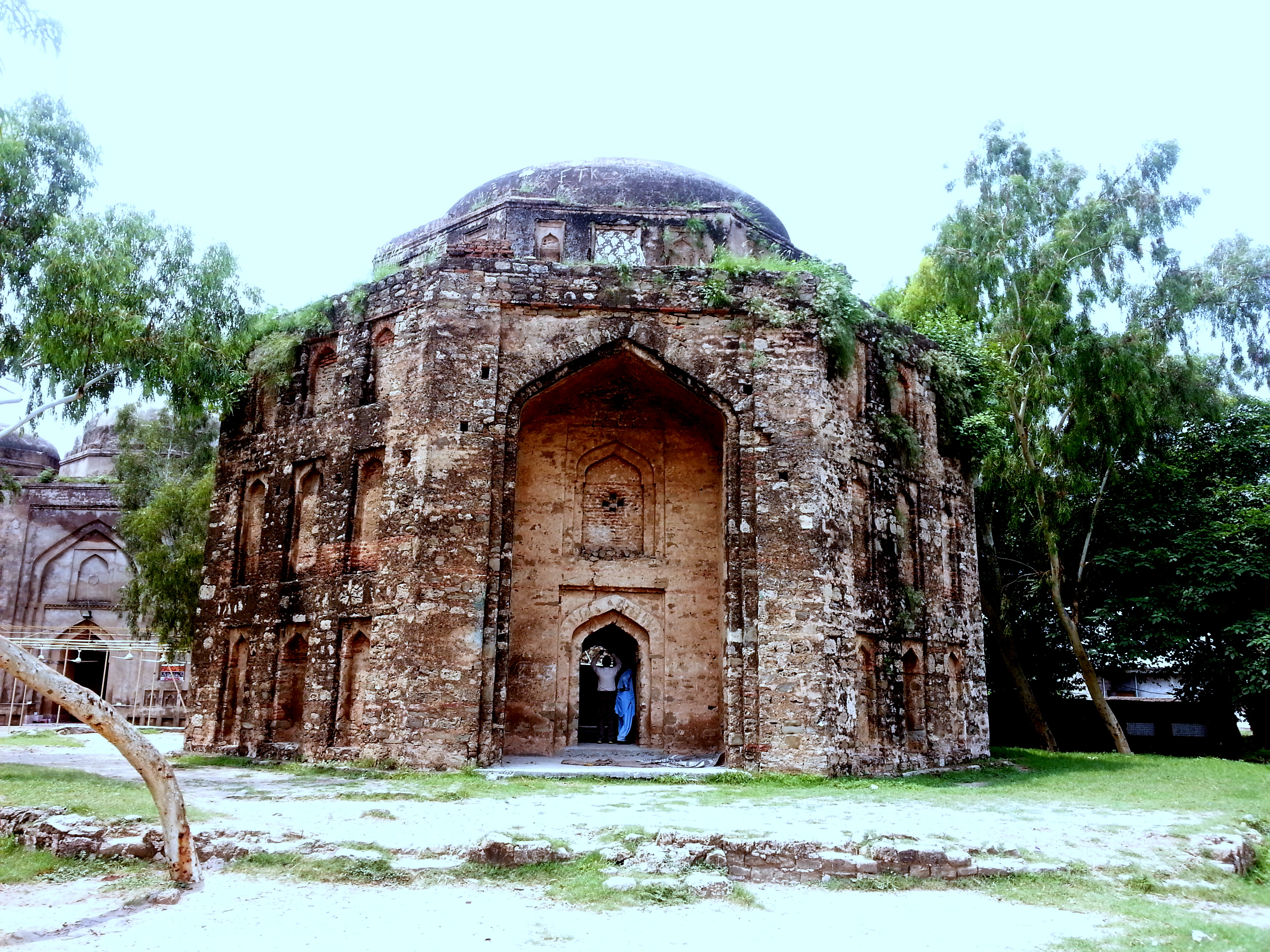
The tomb of Sarang Khan, a Gakhar chief who died fighting against Sher Shah Suri

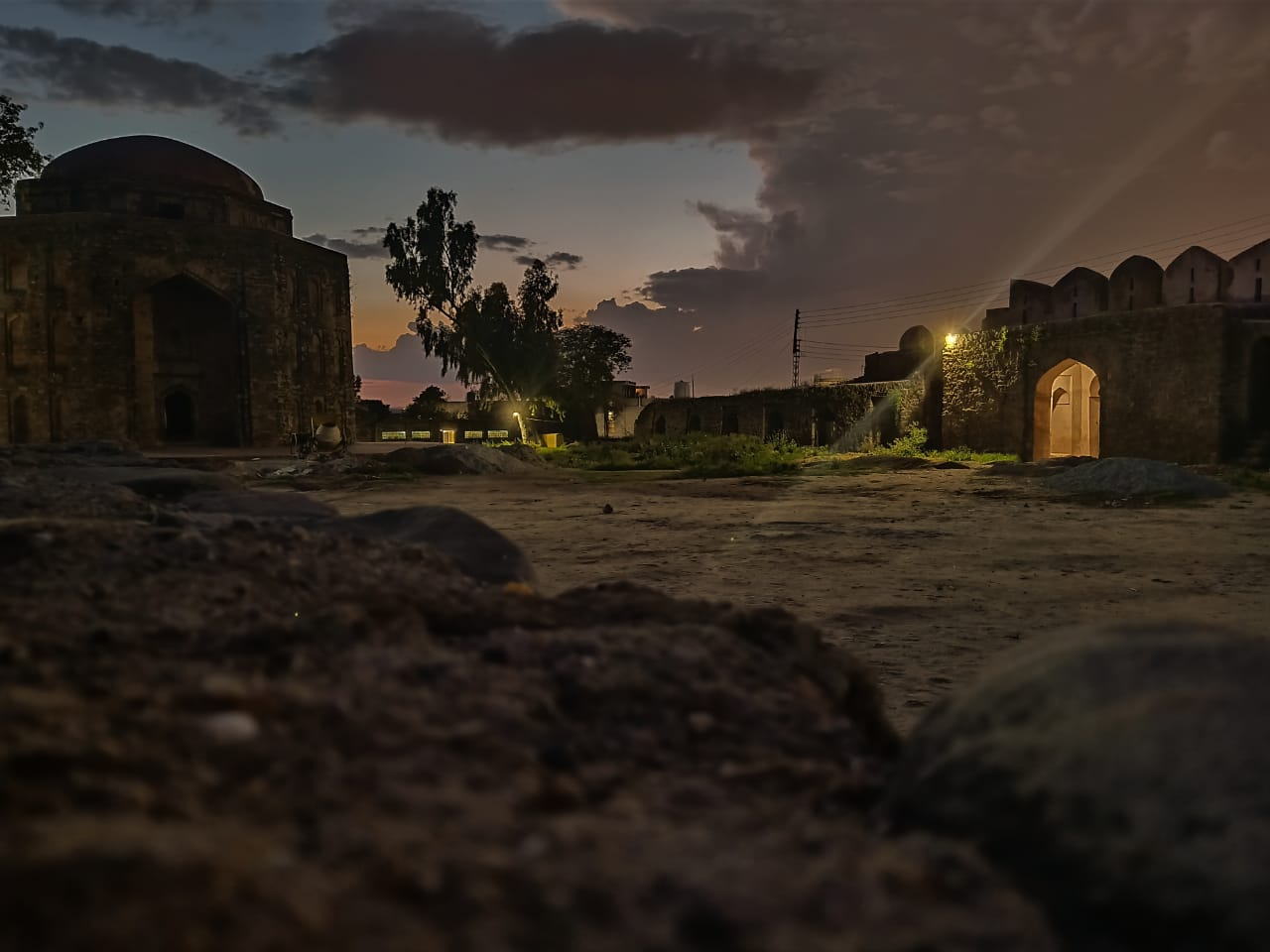
Rawat Sarai during night

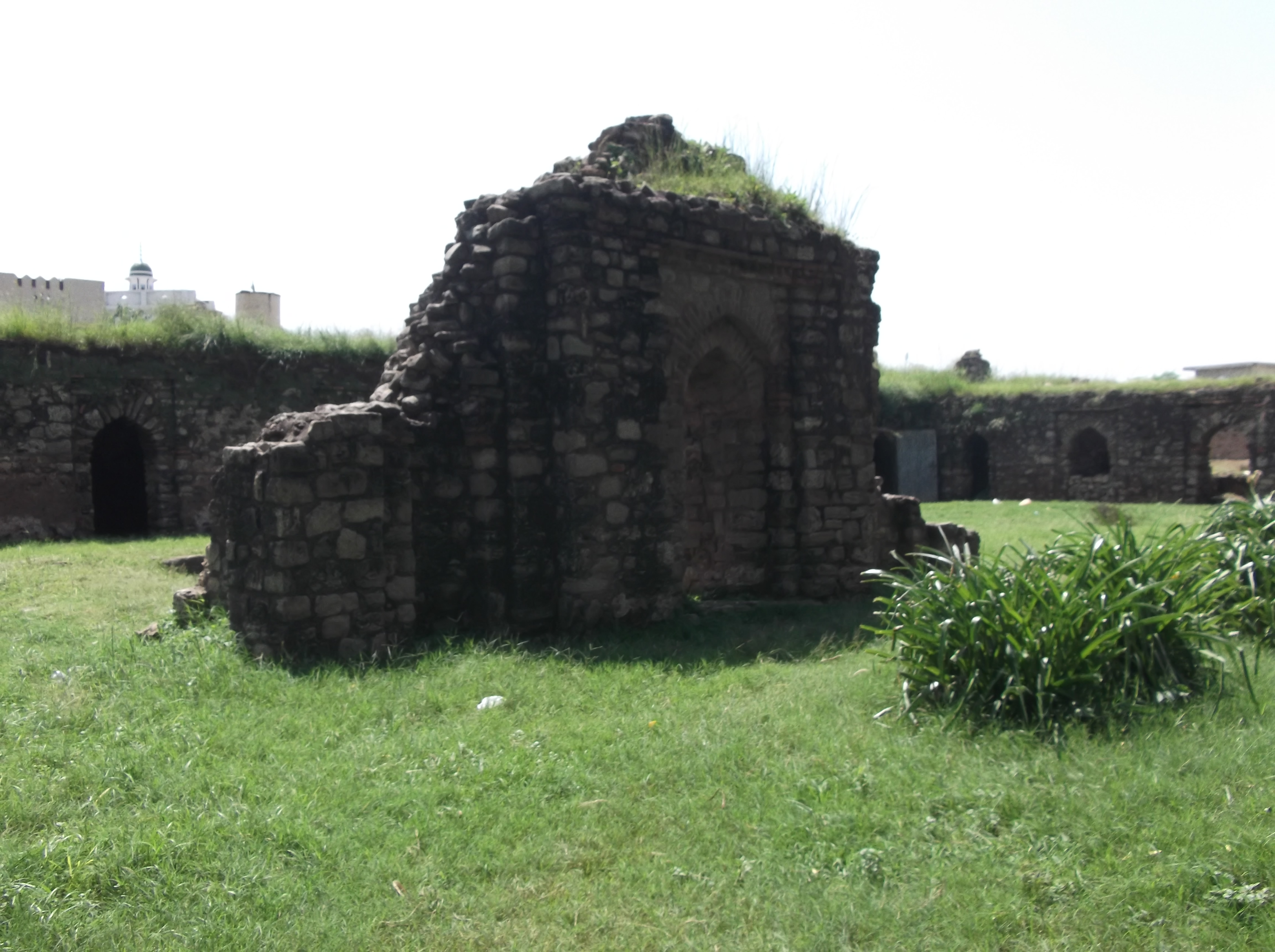
A ruined monument

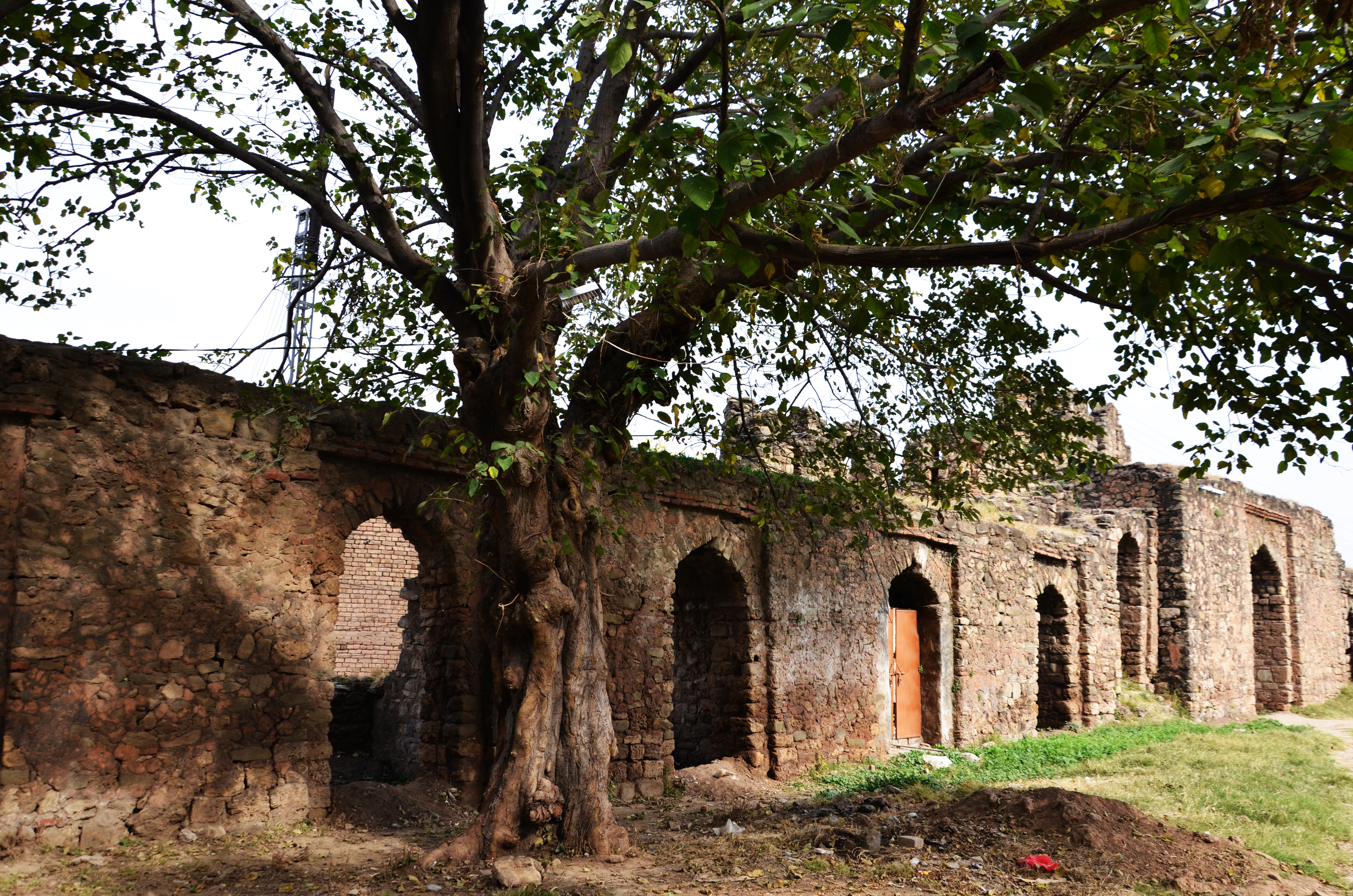
Portions of wall

== See also ==
- List of forts in Pakistan
- Sar Jalal
- Pharwala Fort
