= Adam Khan Gakhar =

Gakhar chief from 1541 to 1562

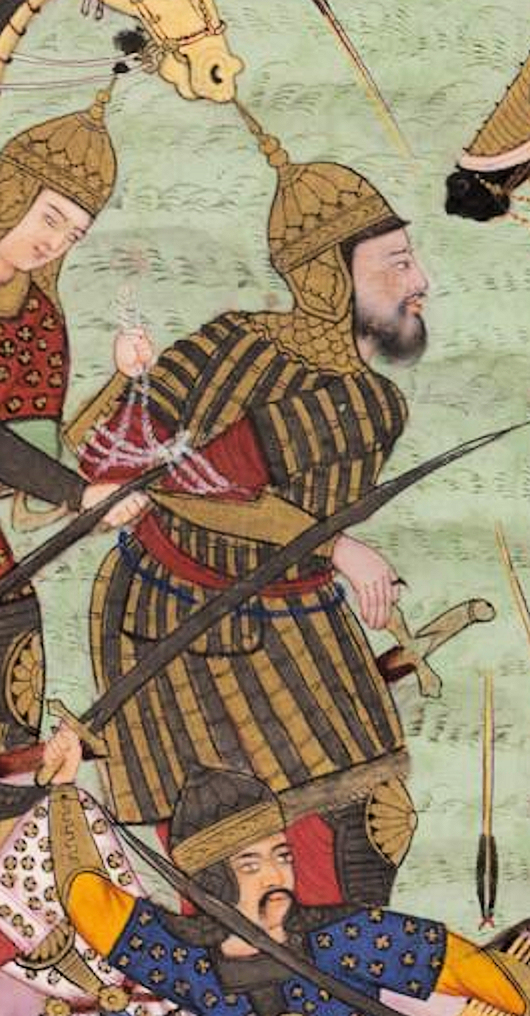
- Adam Khan captured by the Mughals, detail from a 1589 painting
- Years active: 1541–1562
- Title: Chief of the Gakhars
- Predecessor: Sarang Khan Gakhar
- Successor: Kamal Khan Gakhar

Sultan Adam Khan was the chief of the Gakhar clan who succeeded his brother Sarang Khan after the latter's death in 1541. Like Sarang Khan, he continued the clan's resistance to the Sur dynasty and later aided the Mughals under Humayun in 1553 to help retake their throne.

== Background ==
The Gakhars were an influential tribe along the Salt Range in northern Punjab. Since the time of Babur, they had been allied with the Mughals. Adam Khan, accompanied by a Gakhar force, attended the Mughal emperor Babur in Delhi, who confirmed the clan in its position. After Humayun was defeated by Sher Shah Suri, the Gakhar chief Sarang Khan refused to recognise the change in power. Sher Shah responded by invading northern Punjab, killing Sarang Khan and his sons, and ordering the construction of Rohtas Fort to suppress the tribe. The Surs never fully subjugated the Gakhars, however, and the struggle between the two continued during the reign of Islam Shah as well.

== Tenure ==
In September 1553, Adam Khan captured Mirza Kamran as he attempted to flee, and surrendered him to Humayun, for which he was rewarded. During the reign of Akbar, an imperial order divided the territories in Adam Khan's possession, assigning a share to Kamal Khan, his nephew. Adam Khan resisted the order and was subdued by a royal force; he was captured, and his son fled toward Kashmir but was later taken as well. The territory was subsequently transferred to Kamal Khan. This policy may have been intended to weaken the Gakhars by fostering rivalry between the two claimants. Following his defeat, Adam Khan was put to death by Kamal Khan.
