= Gakhars =

Muslim Punjabi clan

- Religions: Islam
- Languages: Pothwari
- Country: Pakistan
- Region: Punjab
- Ethnicity: Punjabi

The Gakhar (Punjabi: گکھڑ, romanized: Gakkhaṛ) is a historical Punjabi tribe, originating from the Pothohar Plateau of Punjab, Pakistan. They predominantly adhere to Islam.

== History ==
In the Muslim historiography, the Gakhars have been frequently confused with the Khokhars, who inhabited the same region, and it has been challenging to separate the events of both tribes. Gakhars formed an important part of the army of Shāhis of Gandhāra. Around 30,000 Gakhars fought against Maḥmūd of Ghazna in 1008 CE near Peshawar but were defeated. By the time of Sultan Muʿizz al-Dīn Muḥammad Ghūrī Gakhars had converted to Islam.

In the following centuries, Gakhars engaged in a long-running struggle for sovereignty over the Salt Range with the neighbouring tribes. According to S. R. Bakhshi:

The history of this region (the Salt Range) from the thirteenth century onward had been a sickening record of wars between various dominant landowning and ruling clans of Punjabi Muslims including the Janjuas, Gakhars, Thathals and Bhattis for political ascendancy.

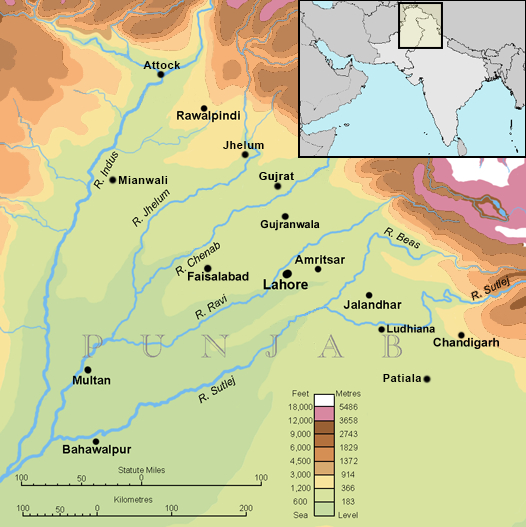
Topographical map of Punjab

For a period, Gakhars were superseded by the Khokhars who under their chieftain Jasrat gained control of most of upper Punjab in the 15th century. However, by the time of Mughal emperor Bābur's invasion of subcontinent, Gakhars had regained power. Under their chief Hātī Khān, Gakhars attacked Babūr in 1525 when he marched against the Delhi Sultanate. Babūr seized Gakhar fortress of Phaŕwāla and Hātī Khān fled, but when Hātī Khān offered his submission to Babūr and provided supplies for the Mughal army, he compensated Hātī Khān well and conferred on him the title of Sultan.

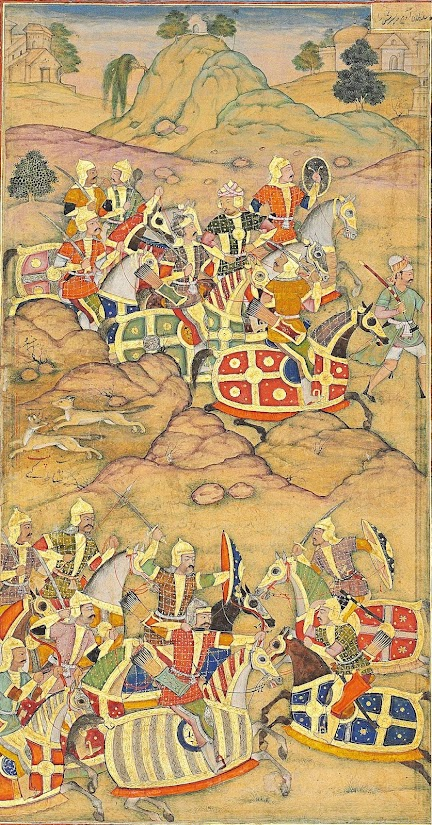
Kamāl Khān defeats Ādam Khān

During the reign of Humāyūn, Sulṭān Sārang Khān gained much prominence. He refused to acknowledge Shēr Shāh Sūr as new emperor when the latter defeated Humāyūn, as a result Shēr Shāh led an expedition against Sārang Khān who was defeated and executed. His tomb is in Rawāt.

Sārang Khān's brother, Ādam Khān succeeded him. In 1552, Humāyūn's rebel brother prince Kamrān sought shelter with Ādam Khān but he was betrayed and given up to Humāyūn, who rewarded Ādam Khān with the insignia of nobility for the treachery.

In 1555, Ādam Khān was defeated and killed by his nephew Kamāl Khān, a son of Sārang Khān, possibly on the instigation by emperor Akbar to strengthen his hold over the Gakhars. Further a daughter of Kamāl Khān's brother, Sayd Khān was married to prince Salim.

In 1738 Nader Shah invaded India, during this invasion the city of Gujrat was sacked and after Shah returned to Persia, the city was then taken over by Gakhar chief Muqarrab Khan.

== Surnames ==
Today, many Gakhars use the surname Kayani , also spelled Kiyani or Kiani, which is tied to the legendary Kayanian dynasty. The name means 'royal' or 'kingly', similar to the title Raja or Prince.

== See also ==
- Gakhar Mandi
