= Sarang Khan Gakhar =

Gakhar chief from 1520 to 1541

Sarang Khan Gakhar سارنگ خان گکھڑ
- Sultan
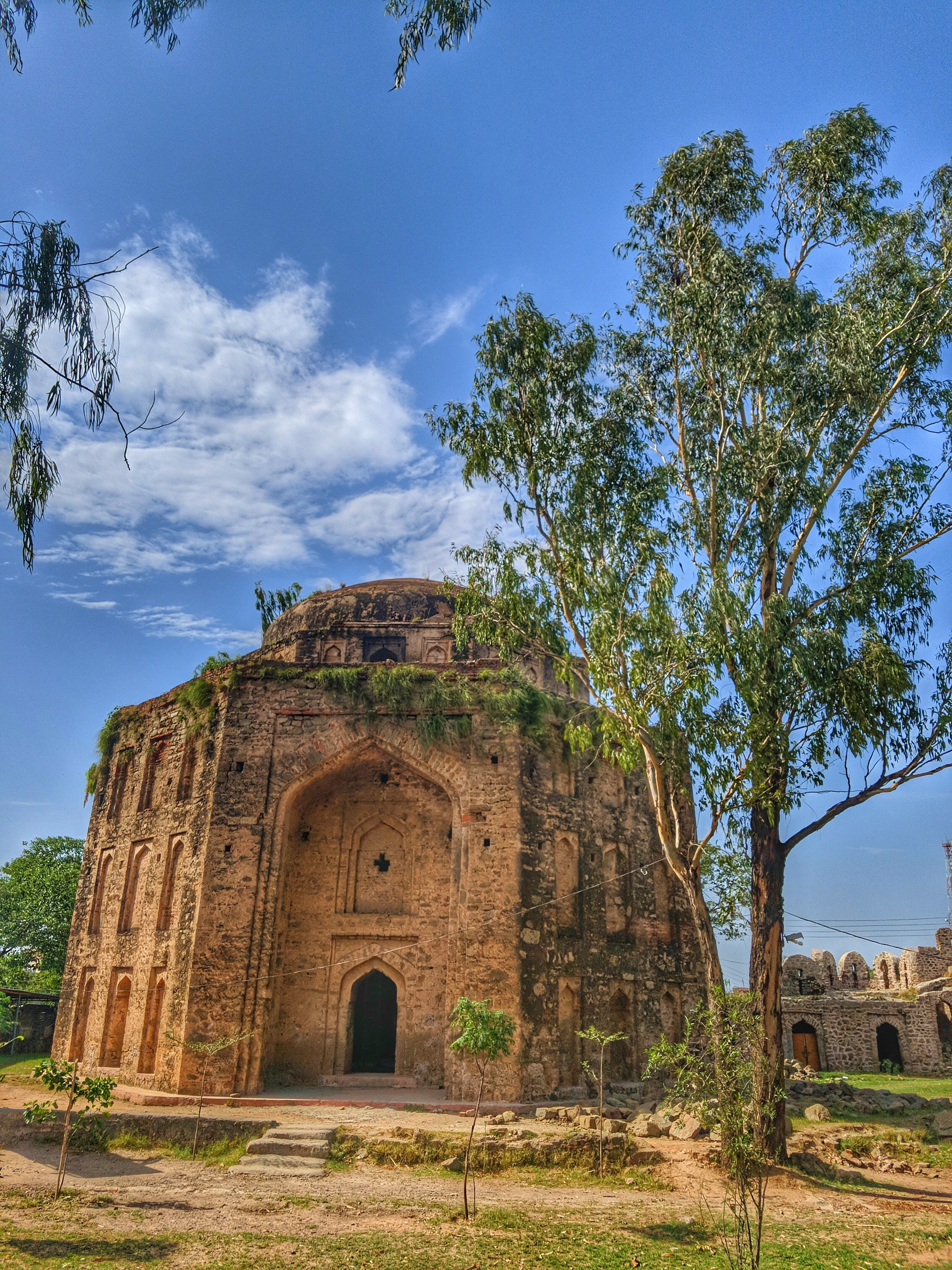
- The tomb of Sarang Khan in Rawat Fort

Gakhar chief
- Reign: 1520–1541
- Predecessor: Hathi Khan Gakhar
- Successor: Adam Khan Gakhar
- Died: 1541; Rawat Fort, Rawalpindi, Punjab (present-day Rawat, Pakistan)
- Burial: Rawat, Punjab, Pakistan
Names
- Sarang Gakhar putr Tatar Gakhar سارنگ گکھڑ پتر تاتار گکھڑ
- Father: Tatar Gakhar
- Religion: Islam

Sarang Khan Gakhar (Punjabi: سارنگ خان گکھڑ) was a Punjabi Muslim chief of the Gakhar clan. He became chief in 1520 after the death of Hathi Khan, and was recognised on his position by the Mughal emperor Babur.

Sarang Khan refused to recognise Suri usurpation of power from Humayun and died fighting against Sher Shah Suri at Rawat Fort in 1541 along with 16 of his sons.

== See also ==
- Gakhar Mandi
