= Chunar =

- City
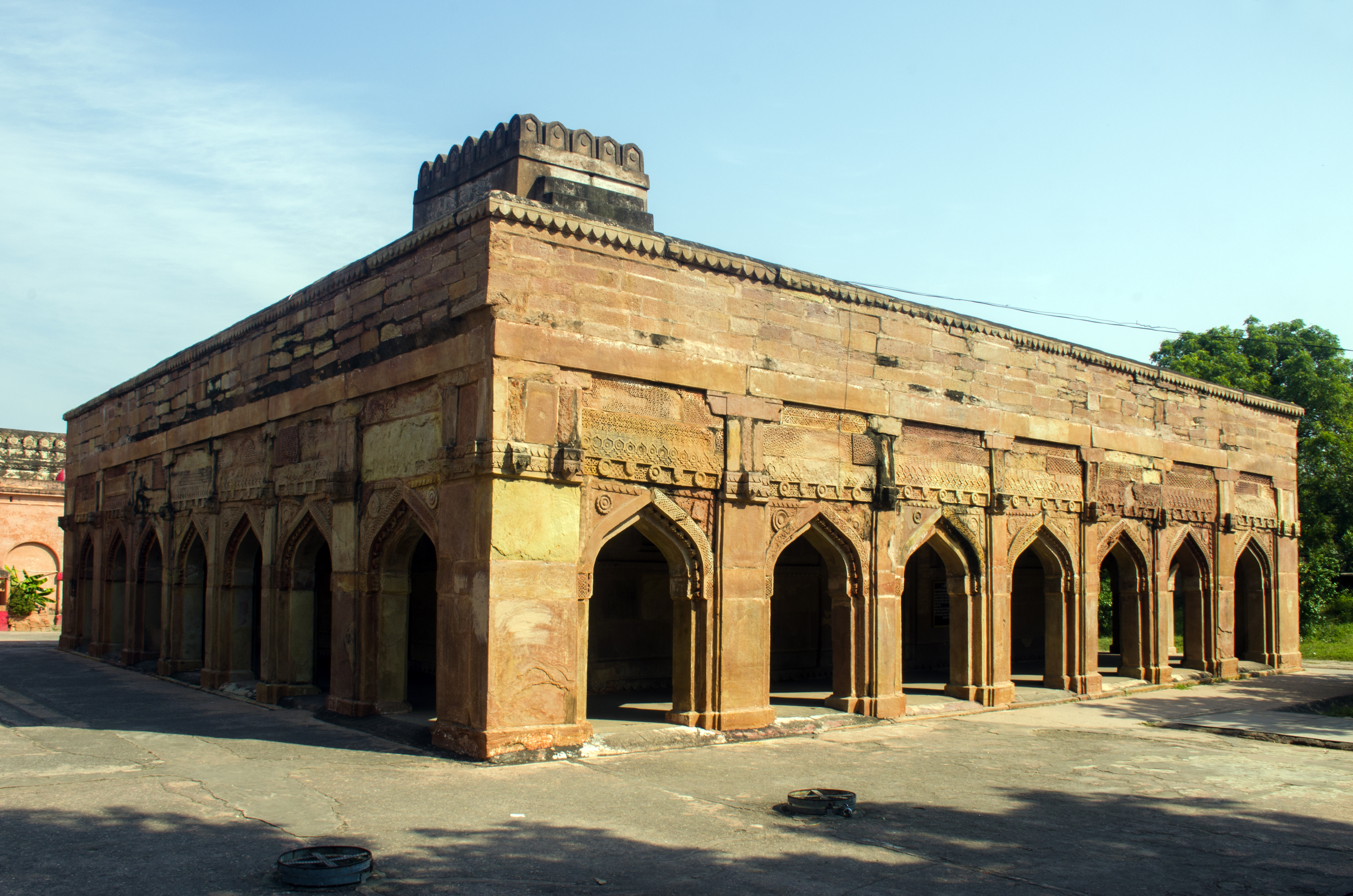
- Sonwa Mandap, Chunar Fort

- Location within Uttar Pradesh Location within India
- Coordinates: 25.13°N 82.9°E
- Country: India
- State: Uttar Pradesh
- District: Mirzapur

Government
  - Type: Local self government
  - Body: Nagar Palika Parishad
- Elevation: 84 m (276 ft)

Population (2011)
  - Total: 37,185

Language
  - Official: Hindi
  - Additional official: Urdu
- Time zone: UTC+5:30 (IST)
- PIN: 231304
- Telephone code: 05443
- Vehicle registration: UP-63
- Website: https://mirzapur.nic.in/public-utility/chunar/

Chunar is a city located in district Mirzapur of Indian state of Uttar Pradesh. It is nearby Mirzapur city. The railway tracks passing through Chunar Junction railway station leads to major destinations of India, including Howrah, Delhi, Tatanagar and Varanasi. National Highway 35 (old NH7) also passes through Chunar. It is connected to the city of Mirzapur and Varanasi by roads and rails. Chunar is well known for its handicraft products made from clay and plaster of paris. It is also well known for its historic Chunar Fort.

== History ==
The Chunar Fort was established by Maharaja Vikramaditya, the King of Ujjain, in honour of his brother Raja Bharthari's stay. It is believed that Raja Bharthari left his body and took Mahasamadhi at this fort, a servant disciple continues to maintain the place and offers deepam dhupam to the Raja daily (as of 8 November 2011).

As per Alha Khand in 1029 AD, King Sahadeo made Chunar fort his capital and established the statue of Naina Yogini in a cave of Vindhya hill and put the name as Nainagarh. King Sahadeo built a stone umbrella based on 52 pillars in the memory of the victory on 52 other kings, inside the fort which is still preserved. He had a brave daughter who got married with Alha the then King of Mahoba whose marriage place in still preserved with the name of Sonava Mandap. Beside this some other stories are also related with the fort as Magna-Deogarh, Ratan Deo's Burj (tower) and King Pithaura who named it Patthargarh as well.

In mid July 1537, Humayun left Agra and arrived at Chunar after 5 months and spent 3 months besieging the Chunar fort. Humayun later offered Chunar and Jaunpur to Sher Shah Suri in exchange for Bengal.

It has importance due to the stay of the founder of Mughal Dynasty Babar in 1525 AD. Later on Shershah Suri obtained the possession of the fort by marrying the widow wife of Taj Khan Sarang-Khani, the Governor of Ibrahim Lodi. In 1574 AD, Akbar the Great captured the fort and since then it was in the Mughal regime up to 1772 AD. Once emperor Jahangir appointed one Iftikhar Khan as Nazim and in the regime of Aurangzeb one of his Governor's Mirza Bairam built a mosque in 1663 AD. near the Bhairo-Burj.

In 1772 AD the fort was captured by the East India Company who established in it a depot of Artillery and ammunition. Later it was taken by Maharaja Chait Singh of Benaras temporarily and after Chait Singh outbreak in 1781 AD. Warren Hastings retired for safety to Chunar where a force was collected by Major Phophan, which expelled Chait Singh from his stronghold in his neighbourhood. Hastings liked the situation and climate, and his residence is still standing. Near it, there is a sundial bearing the inscription. The British used the boat for tax collection from the boats.

== Geography ==
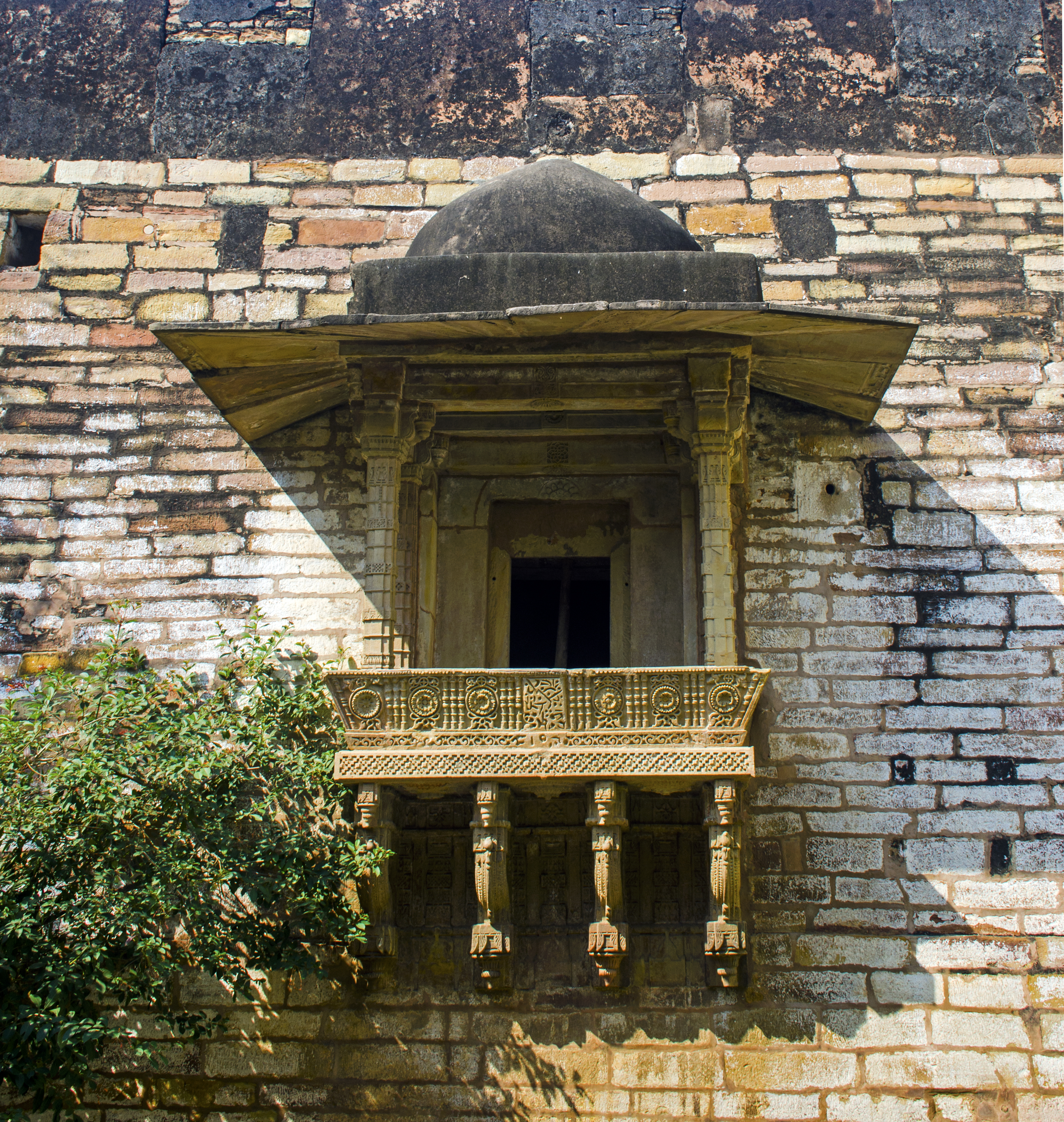
Oriel window at Chunar Fort

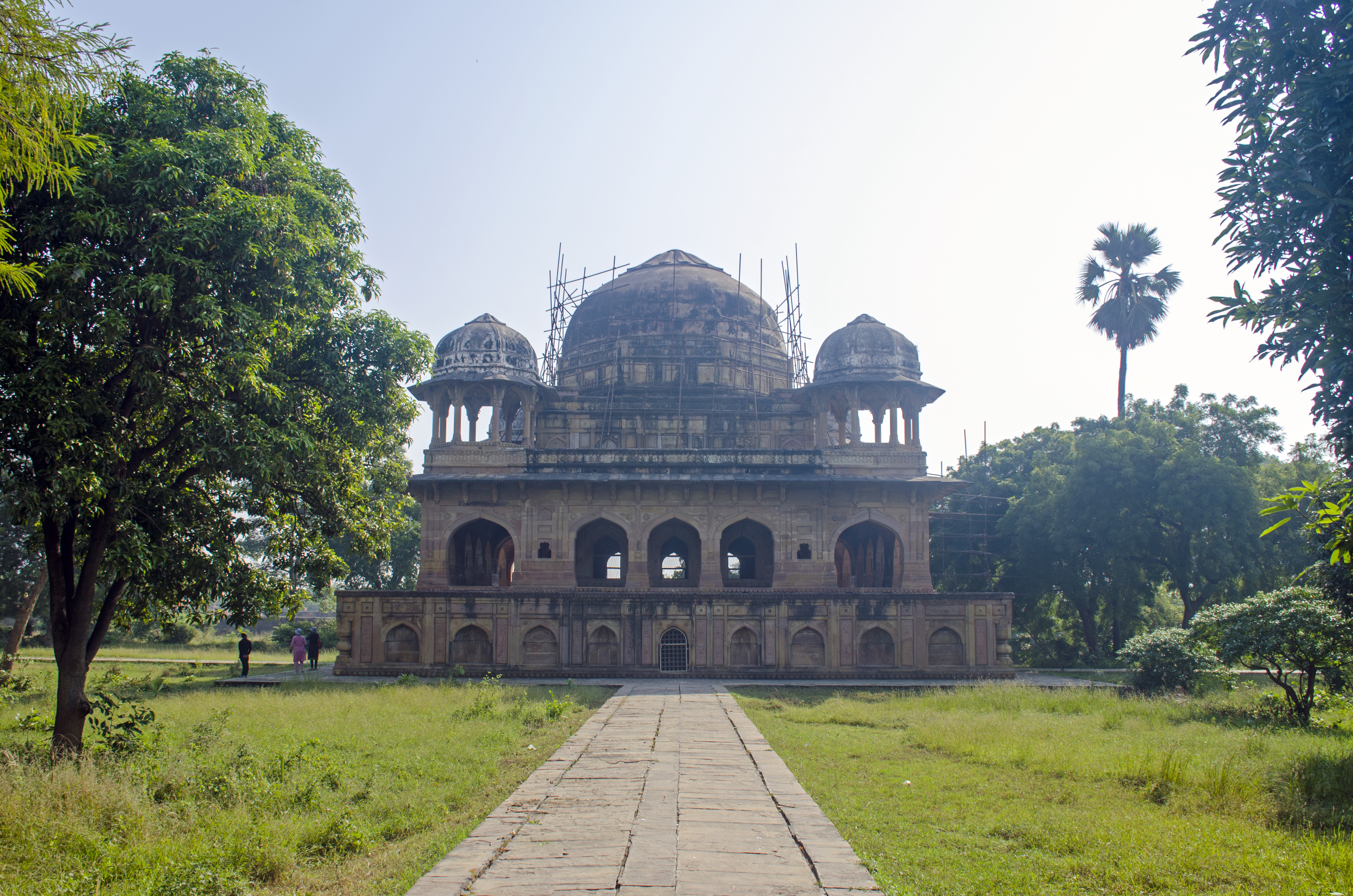
Iftikar Khan's Tomb

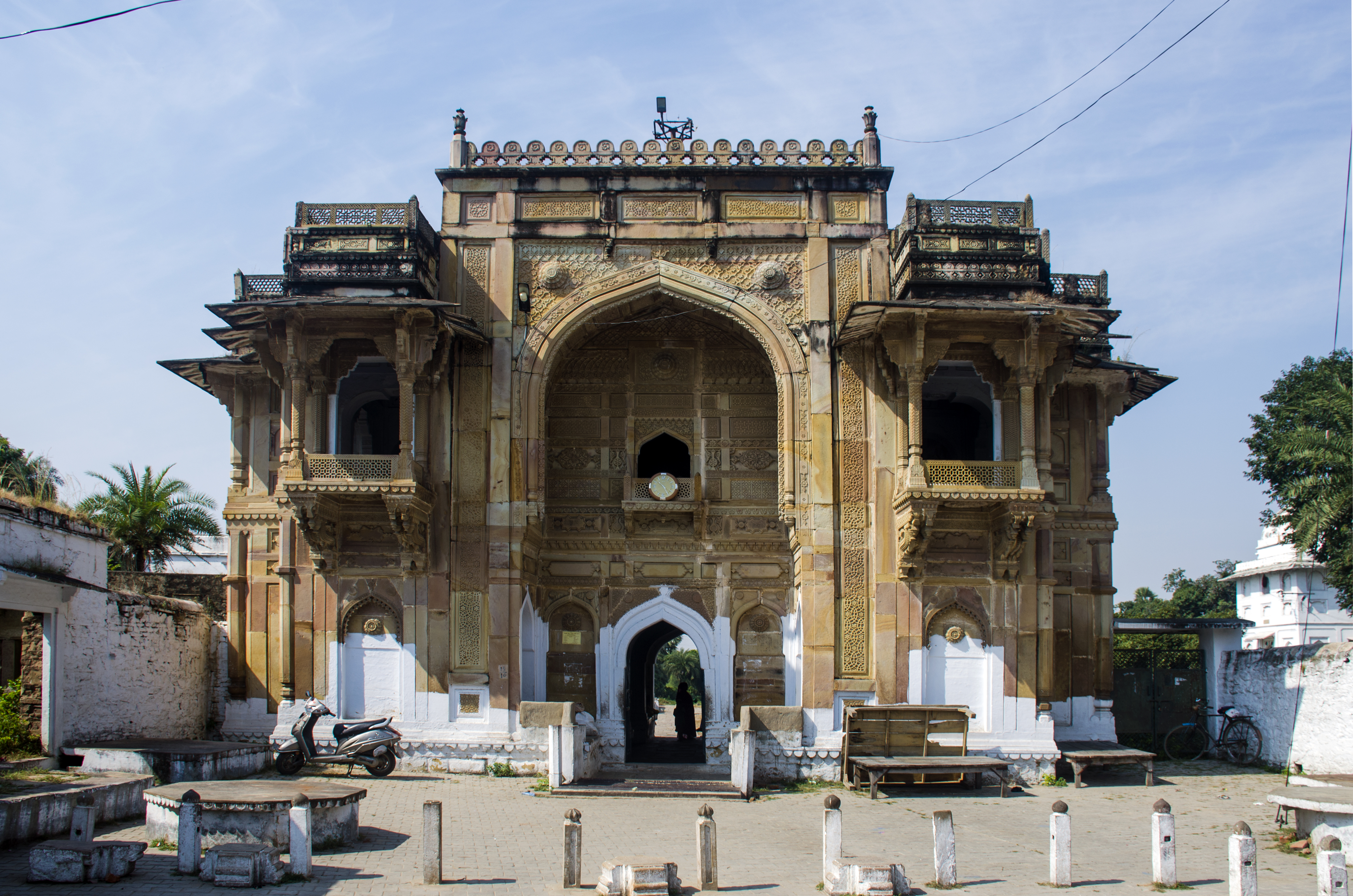
Gate of Qasim Shah Sulemani's Dargah Complex

Chunar city is existing in a triangular from on the right bank of the holy Ganga and the left bank of the Jargo River. It is located at 25.13°N 82.9°E.The city has an average elevation of 84 m (276 ft) above sea level, which is average in comparison to the surrounding region. The river Ganga flows throughout the year, helping the city avoid droughts. However, the river Ganga occasionally overflows its bank, causing flood-like situations. In summer, the temperature here varies from 32 °C to 43 °C. On the other hand, in winter (2022) it goes from 25 °C to 9 °C in temperature. and in rainy days, rainfall is 111cms.(annual) approx.+ which counts as average annual rainfall in India (110 cm).

== Demographics ==
As of the 2011 Indian census, Chunar had a total population of 37,185, of which 19,647 were males and 17,538 were females. Population within the age group of 0 to 6 years was 4,926. The total number of literates in Chunar was 24,674, which constituted 66.4% of the population with male literacy of 73.5% and female literacy of 58.3%. The effective literacy rate of the population of Chunar was 76.5%, of which male literacy rate was 84.3% and female literacy rate was 67.6%. The Scheduled Castes and Scheduled Tribes population was 5,657 and 119 respectively. Chunar had 5951 households in 2011.

== Tourism ==
Being a historic town, Chunar has its share of tourism. Because of its proximity with Varanasi it can be explored on a day trip from Varanasi. The town has its share of forts, Mughal-era tombs and dargah and even a British-era Christian cemetery.

1. Chunar Fort: The Chunar Fort is located on the right bank of Ganges and stands on a rocky outcrop, which happens to be an extension of the Vindhya Range. The fort has its share of legends and history. According to archaeological findings, the earliest part of the fort dates back to 5 - 6 th century BCE. The recorded history of the fort is only available from the time of Babar. In 1791 the fort came under British rule. Today large chunk of the fort is under Uttar Pradesh Tourism. It functions as a police training school and is inaccessible to tourists. Only areas like the Sonwa Mandap and Diwan-i-Khas are accessible.
2. British Cemetery: The fort had a heavy British presence ever since the late 18th century. Many of these Britisher and their family members died in Chunar and were led to rest in the British Cemetery. The small cemetery is located next to the road leading to the fort.
3. Iftekar Khan Tomb: Iftekar Khan was a general of the Mughal ruler Jahangir. He died in Bengal in 1612 and was buried in a magnificent tomb. Today, the tomb lies at the centre of a Mughal-styled char-bag garden. It is approachable through a massive gateway on the eastern side. The tomb and gate are both built of chunar stone and have intricate ornamentation.
4. Dargah of Qasim Shah Sulemani: Qasim Shah Sulemani was a Sufi mystic who lived in the time of Jahangir. Jahangir was always against these mystics and had him arrested. He was put in a prison in Chunar Fort. But, even during his imprisonment, he was seen praying on the banks of the Ganga by hundreds of locals. When Jahangir witnessed the miracle himself, he released him. After his death, he was laid to rest in a magnificent tomb overlooking the Ganges. Today the tomb complex is approached by a magnificent ornate chunar stone gateway. The complex also houses the tomb of Qasim Shah Sulemani's son Wasil Shaw. The complex houses several other structure including mosques and numerous scattered graves.

== Economy ==
Chunar is known for producing handicraft items especially statues and toys, cup and plates from clay and plaster of paris.

== In the media ==
Several scenes from Mirzapur (TV series) were originally filmed in Chunar. In 2011, the shooting of Anurag Kashyap's film Gangs of Wasseypur took place in Chunar. In the 1990s, Doordarshan series Chandrakanta's shooting also took place in Chunar.

== See also ==
- Niyamatpurkala
- Chaudharipur
