= Chunar Fort =

Fort in Mirzapur, Uttar Pradesh, India

- Part of Chunar City
- Mirzapur Uttar Pradesh, India
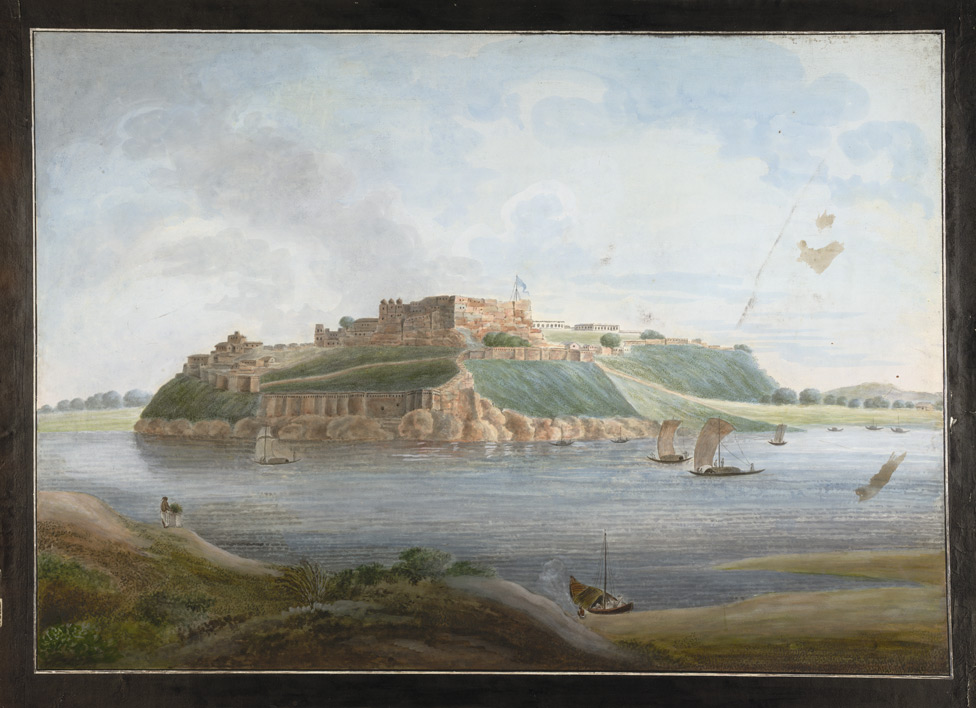
- North view of the fort from across the Ganges River.

Site information
- Type: Fort
- Code: CAR
- Controlled by: Archaeological Survey of India Ministry of Tourism
- Open to the public: Yes

Location
- Location within Uttar Pradesh
- Coordinates: 25.1255°N 82.8747°E
- Height: 280 feet (85 m)

Site history
- Built: Eleventh century and improvements in sixteenth century
- Built by: King Sahadeo in 1029
- Materials: Chunar sandstone

The Chunar Fort (also known as Chandrakanta Chunargarh and Charanadri) is located in Mirzapur district of Uttar Pradesh, in India. The fort and Chunar town, near Mirzapur city, are two historic places with common history and legends. The fort is located 34 kilometres (21 mi) northeast of Mirzapur. The southeastern part of the fort is on the rocky bank of the Ganges River. The fort's history can be traced back to 56 BC. Control of the fort was sought by numerous rulers and empires, including Sher Shah Suri, the Mughal Empire, the Nawab of Awadh, and the East India Company. The fort returned to Indian control in 1947 when India gained independence. Chunar railway station is on the Mughalsarai–Kanpur section of Howrah–Delhi main line.

== Geography ==
Chunar Fort is approached by road from Mirzapur over a distance of 20 miles (32 km) and along the Ganges River by river craft, a 30 miles (48 km) journey. Calcutta is 437 miles (703 km) away and is 14 miles (23 km) south west of Varanasi. The structure is located in the Mirzapur district, 14 miles (23 km) south west of Varanasi, and lies between Varanasi and Mirzapur. The town of the same name is part of the fort's administration.

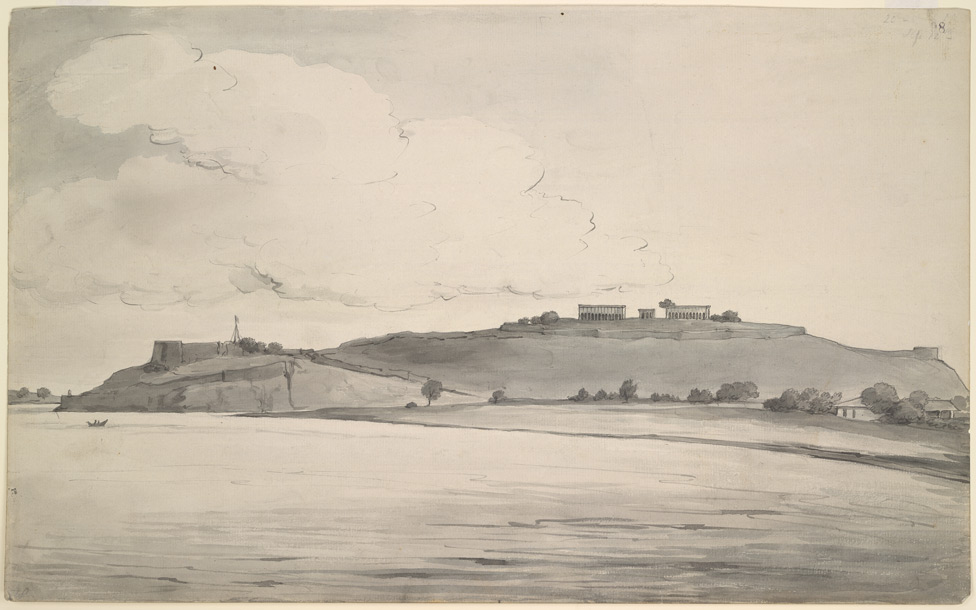
Painting of the fort (1803).

The fort stands on a rock, a detached part of the Vindhya Range, at an elevation of 280 feet (85 m) above sea level. It was built in a commanding position, high above a meander in the Ganges River, near the Kaimur Hills. The approach to Chunar Hill is marked by a chain of low hills, running parallel to the river on its right bank, which is covered by plantations and bungalows. The fort is located on a rock which rises abruptly from the plain, and encroaches into the river for some distance. The southeastern part of the fort is on the rocky bank by the Ganges River, which is navigable for 50- to 60-ton boats. The batteries in the fort command the river reach. The rocky bluff rising from the river on which the fort has been built raises to a height of 104 feet (32 m). Another 200 feet (61 m) further away, the elevation of the rocky hillock is 280 feet (85 m).

The rocky face of the fort is impregnable because of its steep slope. Many crude cylinders were stored in the fort that defenders could roll down onto any enemy soldiers attacking the fort. Most of the enclosed fort area consists of plains overgrown with grass and a few trees.

== Legends ==
There are many legends linking the fort to divine aspects. One such is the story of King Bali. God, known in these parts as Bawan Bhagwan, appeared before Bali, disguised as a Brahmin, and begged for three feet of land. The generous king agreed. God placed his first step on the hill of Chunar Fort and left his foot mark there. Since then it is known as "Charanadri", which over the years took the short form of "Chunar".

The second legend is king Vikramāditya of Ujjain. His brother Bharthari, who opted to live the life of a hermit, started living near the rockface of Chunar. Realising his brother's situation, Vikramadiathya visited Chunar, and after finding out his brother's whereabouts through the hermit Goraknath, built a house for his brother to live in. The black stone where the saint Bhatinath lived and prayed is worshiped even now, as it is believed that Bhatinath is seated in the fort area in an invisible form.

A third legend linked the fort to the well known king of Rajasthan. Prithviraj brought this settlement under his rule and also many neighbouring villages. Subsequent to his demise, his descendants sold the land to Khair-ud-din Subuktagin. An inscription (not very legible) in Sanskrit on the gateway of the fort mentions that the place had been taken over by Swami Raja, who had established a stone tablet recording the event. Later, the fort was acquired by Sahab-ud-din, who in turn appointed a sanidi, an African, and a Bahelia, and gave them titles as hazari (meaning "governors of the fort"), and also conferred a jagir. It is said that the Bahelia family were in possession of the land holdings till the fort was finally ceded to the British in 1772.

== History ==
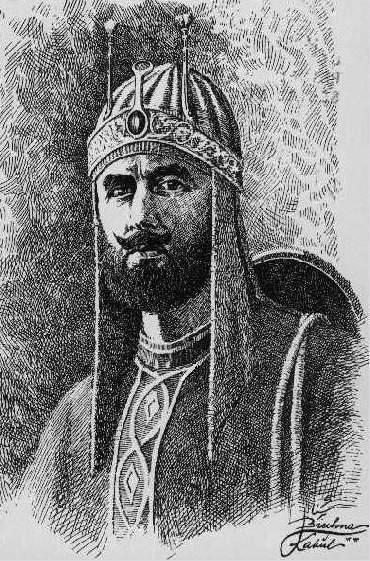
Sher Khan, notable in the history of Chunar Fort, later known as Sher Shah Suri

Settlements have been recorded here since 56 BC, from the time of Vikramāditya of Ujjain. Chunar's earliest recorded history is from the sixteenth century, traced to a garrison of Babar, when in 1529, many of his soldiers were killed; some of their tombs in Chunar are still venerated. In 1532, Sher Khan (later known as Sher Shah Suri after he captured Bengal), a highly ambitious Pathan of Afghan descent but born in district of Narnaul in the present day state of Haryana in India, took control of the fort with high ambitions of becoming the King in Delhi. He acquired Chunar Fort by strategic marriages to enhance his reputation, first with a childless widow (the wife of the deceased Governor of Chunar), and by marrying another widow, he acquired wealth. With these acquisitions, he became very powerful within four years and established a "state within a state". It is also said that the fort was not vital for Sher Khan as he had moved his harem and treasure to Rohtas (a newly won fort in the upper reaches of Son River) during his campaign to win Bengal. When Emperor Humayun attacked the fort and held it in siege for four months, he had proposed to Sher Khan that he would not claim Chunar and Jaunpur and any other place of his choice, provided he gave up Bengal, which Sher Khan had won. Humayun also demanded from Suri the surrender of his treasure which he had taken to Bengal and a precious (chattar) umbrella and throne, and also to agree to be under the protection of the Mughal Empire. He finally succumbed to pressure and signed a deal with Humayun. However, Sher Khan recaptured it when he Humayun marched towards Bengal. After Sher Shah's death in 1545 it remained under his son Islam Shah until 1553. The last of Suris dynasty Adil Shah remained confined to the fort till 1556 handing over the entire administration and military powers to the Hindu Prime Minister Hemu. Hemu launched many attacks from this fort winning several battles across north India and even captured Delhi after the Battle of Tughlaqabad in 1556 and declared independence from the Sur Empire and crowned himself as king. Adil Shah remained in this fort, who lost life in an attack by king of Bengal in 1557. Fort came under the control of the Mughals in 1575.

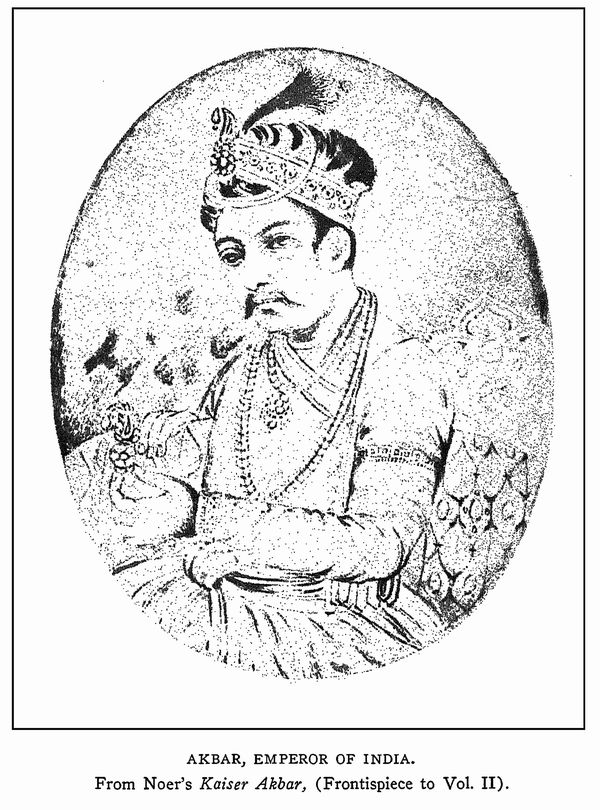
Mughal Emperor Akbar

Akbar, the third Mughal Emperor, had visited Chunar for shikar (hunting) in 1575. He acquired it as he considered the fort strategically located to guard the Ganges and the major land routes to eastern India. Abul al Fazl described this victory over the fort by Akbar an important event. It is believed that much of the fort as seen now was built during Akbar's reign. During his rule, the west gate was built in the fort entrance, with the date 1586 having been engraved on the stone archway. During the Mughal rule, Emperor Jahangir had nominated Iftikhar Khan as the fort's nazim. During the reign of Emperor Aurangzeb, his appointee for Governor of the fort, Mirza Bairam Khan, constructed a mosque here in 1663, near the Bharion Burj. In 1804, Marathas ceded all their territories in Bundelkhand to East India Company following their defeat in the second Anglo-Maratha war. The British East India Company, under Major Munro, attacked the fort; though initially they lost ground, they subsequently breached the south west part of the fort and annexed it. The fort with all its territory was formally ceded under a treaty to the East India Company in 1818. For some years, the fort was the main artillery and ammunition depot of the Northwestern Provinces. Maharaja Chait Singh of Benares had taken possession of the fort temporarily but was evicted. In 1857, he raised a rebellion in Varanasi and near the villages around the fort.

It is also said that Warren Hastings, the first Governor-General of India (1773 to 1784) took shelter in the Chunar Fort. A small armed force was collected under Major Home Riggs Popham and Chait Singh was eventually evicted from his control of neighboring areas. For sometime in 1791, Chunar Fort became the headquarters of an invalid battalion of European and Indian troops serving in India; those officers and men who were considered medically unsuitable for field duty were shifted to this fort and given light duty. From 1815, the fort also housed the state prisoners. In India's first Freedom struggle, also known as Sepoy Mutiny of 1857–58, the fort was the safe ground of the artillery and infantry company of the European invalid Battalion and all also to the officers and European residents of the district. The Bhartri Nath's shrine here was also used for some time as the civil treasury. After 1890, troops were withdrawn from the fort. The building's complex within the fort became the property of the civil administration who used this place as a convalescent jail. Subsequently, it became a religious centre.

In 1849, Maharaja Ranjit Singh's wife, Rani Jind Kaur was incarcerated in Fort Chunar after the British usurped the Sikh kingdom. She escaped from the fort in the disguise of a maid servant and went to Kathmandu where she was granted political asylum.

Chunar Fort was on the hit list of the Naxalites as it was the recruitment training center of the PAC, and has a large amount of arms and ammunition stored in its armoury. Hence, the state government has directed the police to give particular care to protect the fort and the facilities within it.

There is also a paranormal history connected with Chunar Fort i.e. the King of Chunar had buried his rich treasure because he knew that the British people would take it from them. Also he connected aatma with it.

The history of Chunar Fort is summarised in Sanjeev Sanyal's book Land of Seven Rivers: History of India's Geography in the following words:

"It was once said that he who controlled Chunar fort also controlled the destiny of India. A walk through the fort is a walk through Indian history. The walls resonate with tales of the legendary King Vikramaditya, the Mughals, Sher Shah Suri and Governor-General Warren Hastings. There are remains here from each era including an eighteenth-century sundial. Do not miss the neglected British graves below the walls. Their headstones make for interesting reading. Just south-west of the fort are the quarries that, in the third century BC, supplied the stone used by the Mauyans to carve the lions of Sarnath"

== Walls and gates ==
The impregnable citadel is built with huge ramparts overlooking the river and built in tiers. They were built of local sandstone quarried in the area. Chunar's quarries, notable since the Maurya period, were used in building the fort, and skilled masons were available locally. The external walls of the fort were not strong and hence it was breached when British forces attacked the fort with a battering train. The area bounded by the fort covers a length of 750 yards (690 m) in the north–south direction, with a maximum width of 300 yards (270 m) on the northern face, close to the river bank. The peripheral length of the fort is 1,850 yards (1,690 m). The ramparts of the fort have towers built at regular intervals with heights varying from 10–20 feet (3.0–6.1 m).

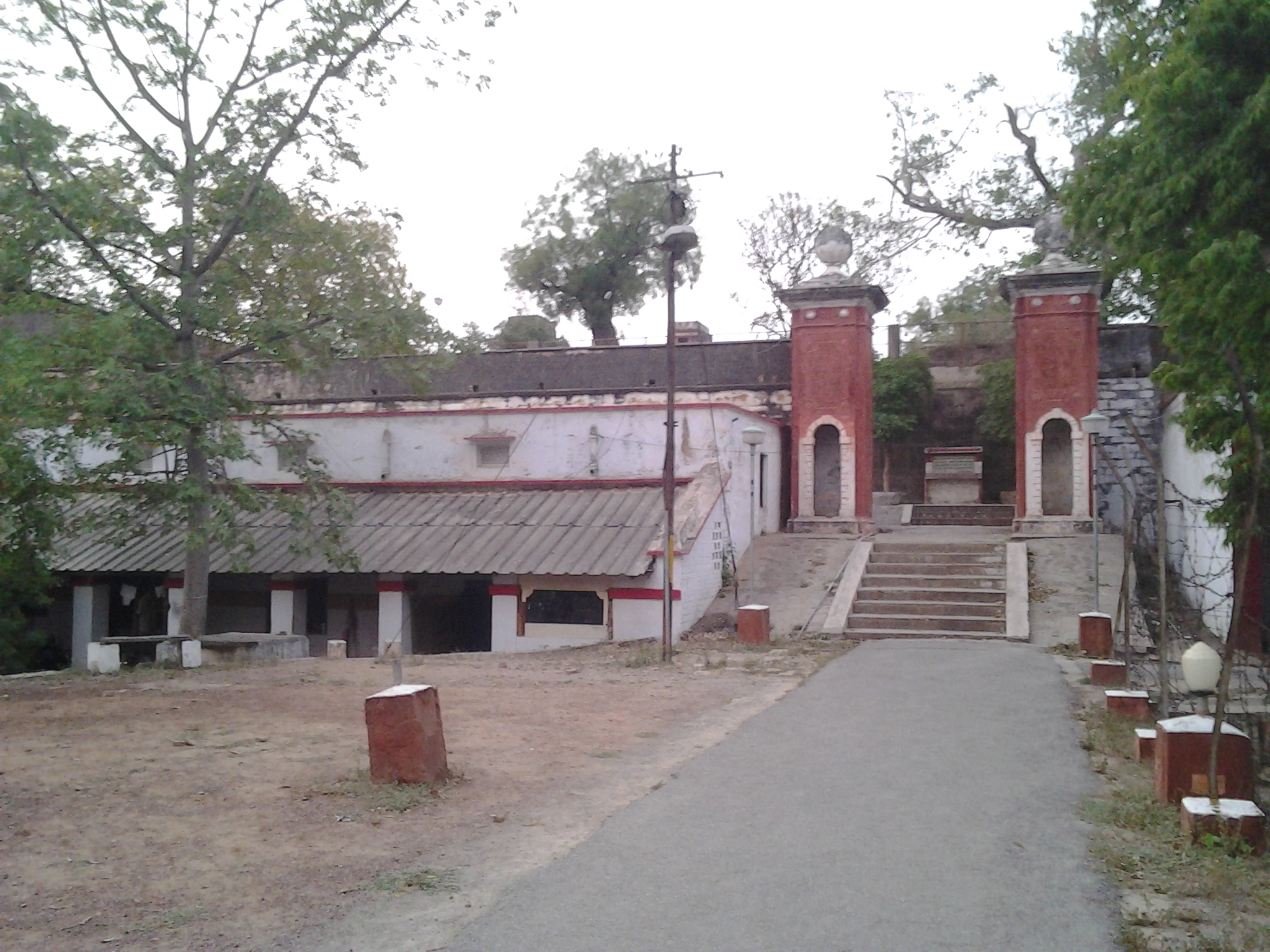
Entrance to the main compound of the fort

Of all the gates, only the fort's west gate has inscriptions, which ascribe to its construction during Akabar's period by Muhammad Sharif Khan, who is presumed to be the son of an artist. He is said to have served under Munim Khan who was granted the fort and the surrounding lands since it yielded a lot of revenue, in 1567. Munim Khan died here in 1575. The west gate has the least ornamentation but has calligraphy engraved slabs. Other gates of the fort have carved panels and brackets.

== Buildings ==
The Citadel which is the main structure of the fort, in its northeastern part, was mounted with many cannons and also had a gunpowder magazine. The S-shaped brackets on the oriel windows have more similarity with the windows in the Agra Fort than other pre-Moghul monuments in eastern India. But some designs such as the knot motif are attributed to the Sur period architecture as seen in Chainpur and Shergarh, both of the Sur period, which attests to the fact that local artisans have contributed to the continuation of the regional traditions in architecture. A number of bungalows (mansions) are located between the trees, which were used as offices and residences of officers during British rule. The Governor's house, a hospital and the state prison are also located here. At the highest point of the rocky bluff within the fort, there is an old Hindu palace, a very large vaulted structure. A well within this area is 15 feet (4.6 m) in diameter and sunk deep; its water is commonly not potable. There is an underground dungeon, which is used as a storeroom now.

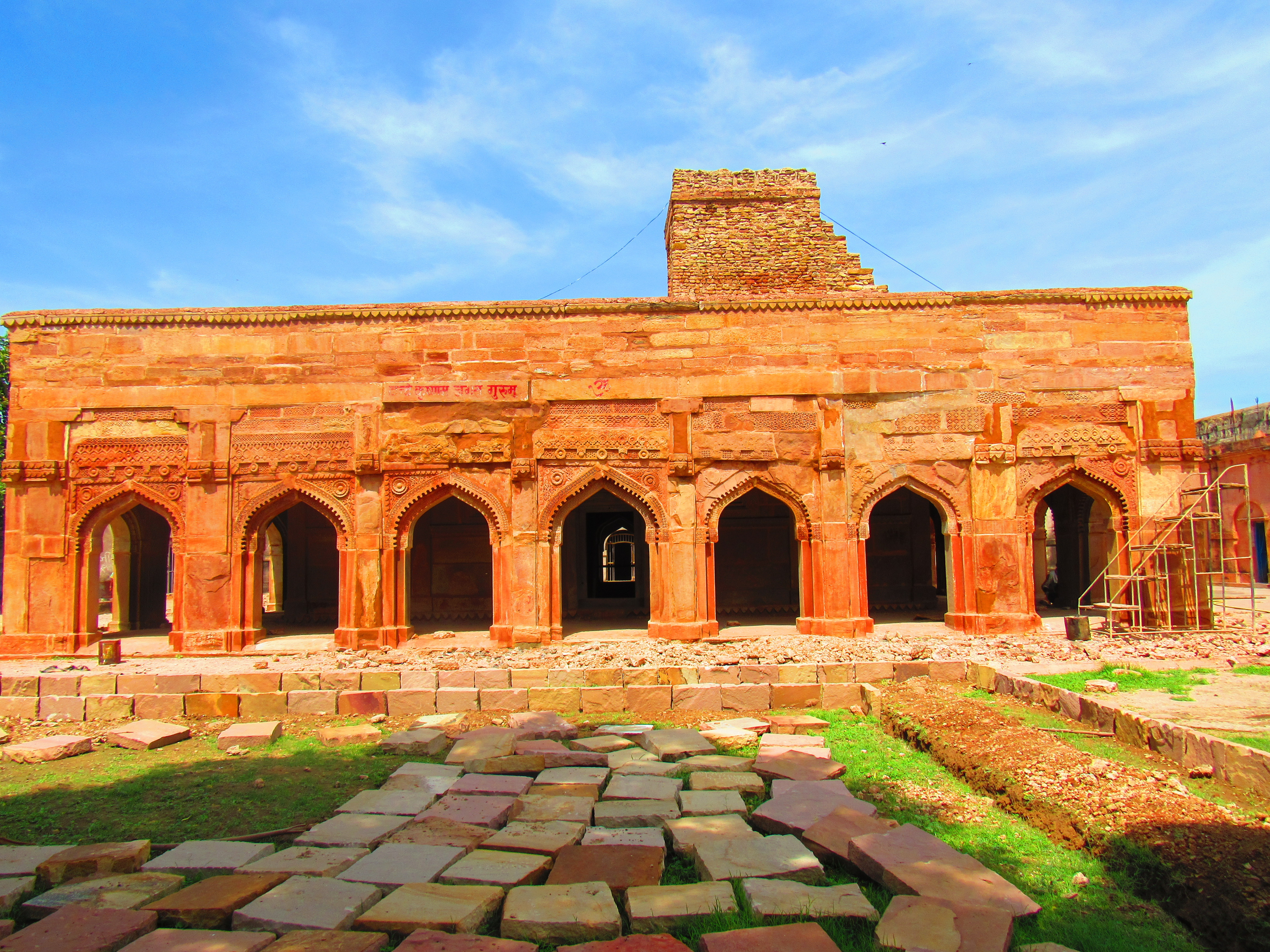
Sonwa Mandap

A pavilion, dating to 1538, was used as the gatehouse. The Sonwa Mandap open pavilion has 28 pillars and is built in the Hindu style of architecture. An engraving on its mehrab is believed to be filled with gold. Bhartri Nath's samadhi is located at the back of this monument where religious ceremonies are conducted. Sonwa Mandap has four gates and a tunnel at the front yard of the building. It is mentioned that in 1333 AD, princess Sonwa, daughter of Sandeva, a Nepali king, came here frequently to take baths in the Ganga River through this tunnel. The access is from the fort. A bawdi measuring 17 feet (5.2 m) diameter and of nearly 200 feet (61 m) depth contains perennial water, its source connection to the Ganga River. It is also mentioned that princess Sonwa used this well for her ablutions. There is also a square stone slab with shade provided by a peepal tree, where according to the local legend, God is seated for 9 hours during the day and the rest of 3 hours of the day shifts to Varanasi, and further mentions that during the absence of God, the fort can be captured only between 6 AM and 9 AM.

== See also ==
- List of forts in Uttar Pradesh
- British Cemetery, Chunar
