= Gurdwara Chowa Sahib =

Gurdwara Chowa Sahib ਗੁਰੂਦਵਾਰਾ ਖੂਹ ਸਾਹਿਬ گردوارہ چوآ صاحب
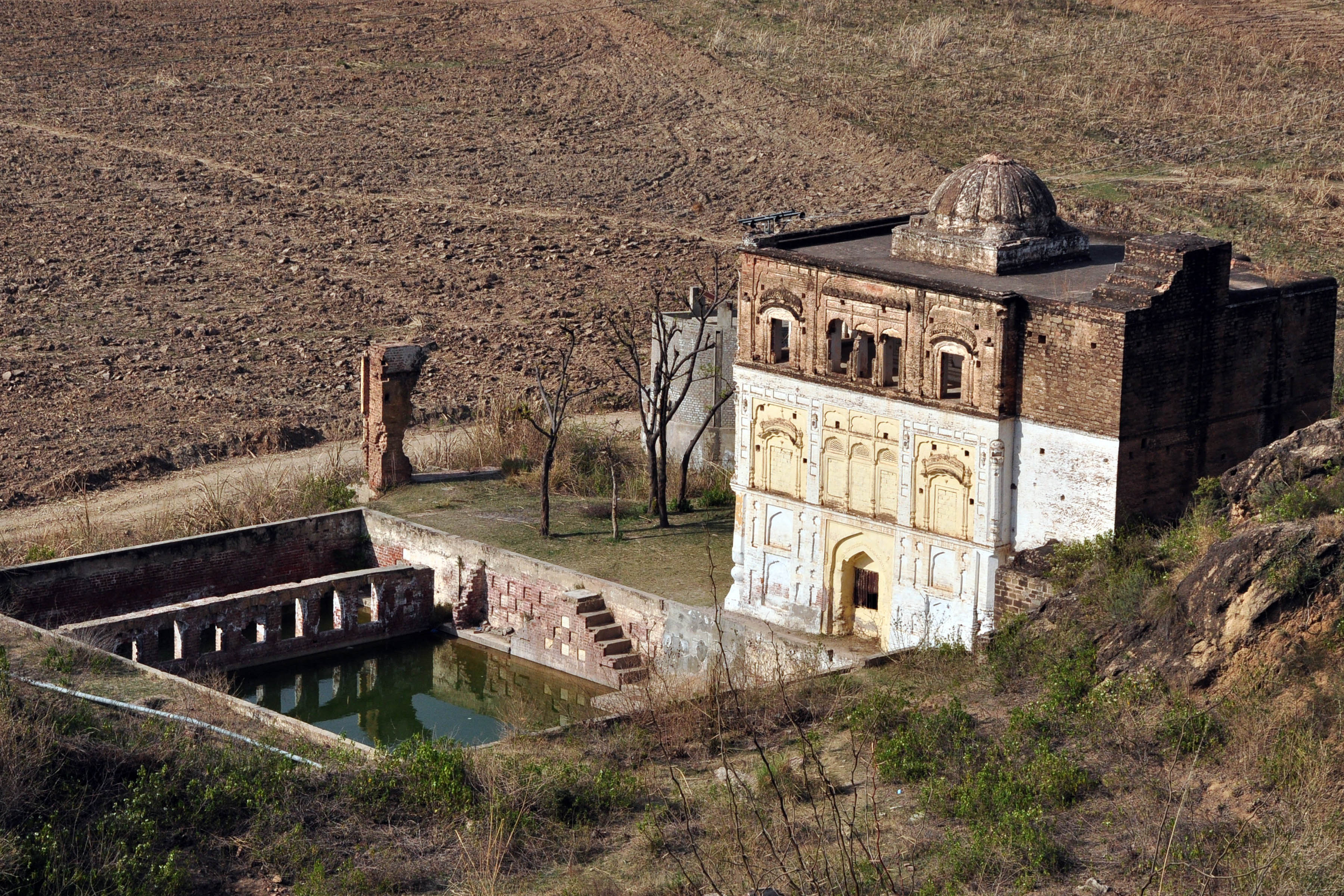
- A view of the Gurudwara's baoli, or stepwell.
- Interactive map of the Gurdwara Chowa Sahib ਗੁਰੂਦਵਾਰਾ ਖੂਹ ਸਾਹਿਬ گردوارہ چوآ صاحب area

General information
- Architectural style: Sikh architecture
- Location: Rohtas Fort, Pakistan
- Coordinates: 32°58′16″N 73°34′24″E
- Completed: 1834

Gurdwara Chowa Sahib (Urdu: گردوارہ چوآ صاحب; lit. 'Gurudwara of the exalted spring') is a gurdwara located at the northern edge of the Rohtas Fort, near Jhelum, Punjab, Pakistan. Situated near the fort's Talaqi Gate, the gurdwara commemorates the site where Guru Nanak is popularly believed to have created a water-spring during one of his journeys known as udasi.

== History ==
The first commemorative structure was built by Charat Singh, who installed a sarovar pool, and area for recitation of the Guru Granth Sahib. The current building dates from 1834, and was commissioned by Maharaja Ranjit Singh. Ranjit Singh's general Gurmukhi Singh Lamba played an important role in maintaining the gurdwara.

After the takeover of the Punjab by Ranjit Singh, Gurmukh Lamba captured Rohtas Fort from the local Gakhar chief Raja Noor Khan, son of Raja Fazldad Khan, in 1825. Due to the enmity of main brothers Raja Gulab Singh and Dhian Singh having influence over Maharaja Ranjit Singh, the fort was given to Mohar Singh. But when Mohar Singh retired to Banaras against the wishes of the Maharaja, the fort and the contingent of seven hundred horses were placed under Gurmukh Singh Lamba. Thus making his command long (Lambi), he was popularly addressed by the Maharaja as Lamba Sardar.

== Significance ==
Sikhs believe that Guru Nanak and Bhai Mardana were traveling in the region during the fourth of Guru Nanak's journeys, known as udasis. The two were traveling during the summer, and had arrived at the site following a 40-day stay at the nearby Tilla Jogian temples. Bhai Mardana expressed his thirst while lamenting that water was scarce in the region during that time of year. Guru Nanak is said to have then struck the earth with his cane and moved a stone, thereby revealing a natural spring.

Sikh lore states that Sher Shah Suri attempted to shift the spring up the hill to use as a source of water for the newly constructed Rohtas Fort. The king's engineers attempted the feat three times, failing each time.

== Conservation ==
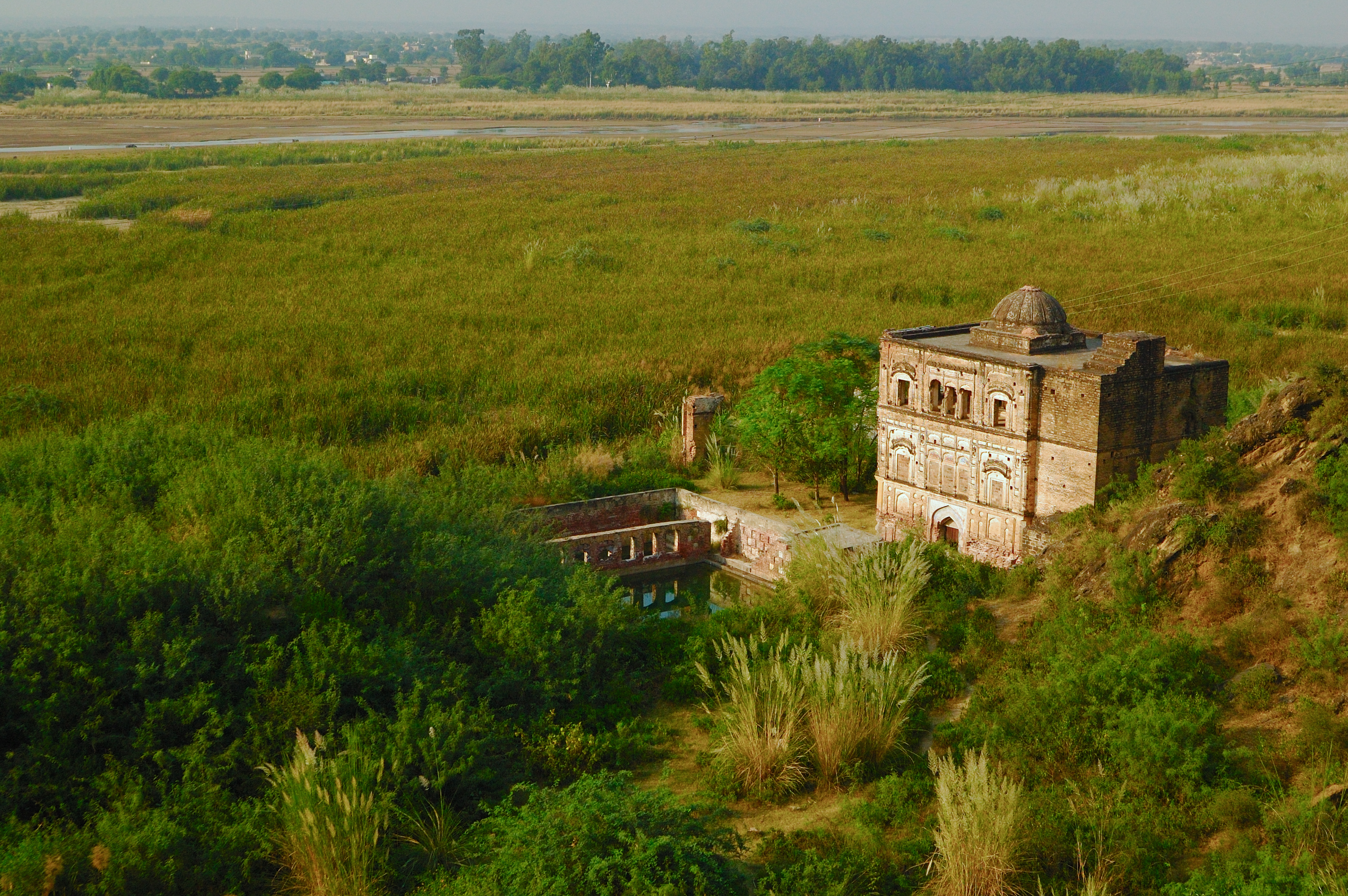
The gurdwara in 2007, prior to restoration works.

The temple stands at the base of a hill upon which the Rohtas Fort, a UNESCO World Heritage Site, is situated.

In 2020, a Sikh community organization based in USA, Ranjit Nagara, took over the rehabilitation and renovation of the gurdwara. The work is being done through international funding via a multicultural team to bring the gurdwara back to its original form and function as well as adding new facilities.

== See also ==
- Kala Dhari Mandir
