= British Cemetery, Chunar =

Cemetery in Uttar Pradesh

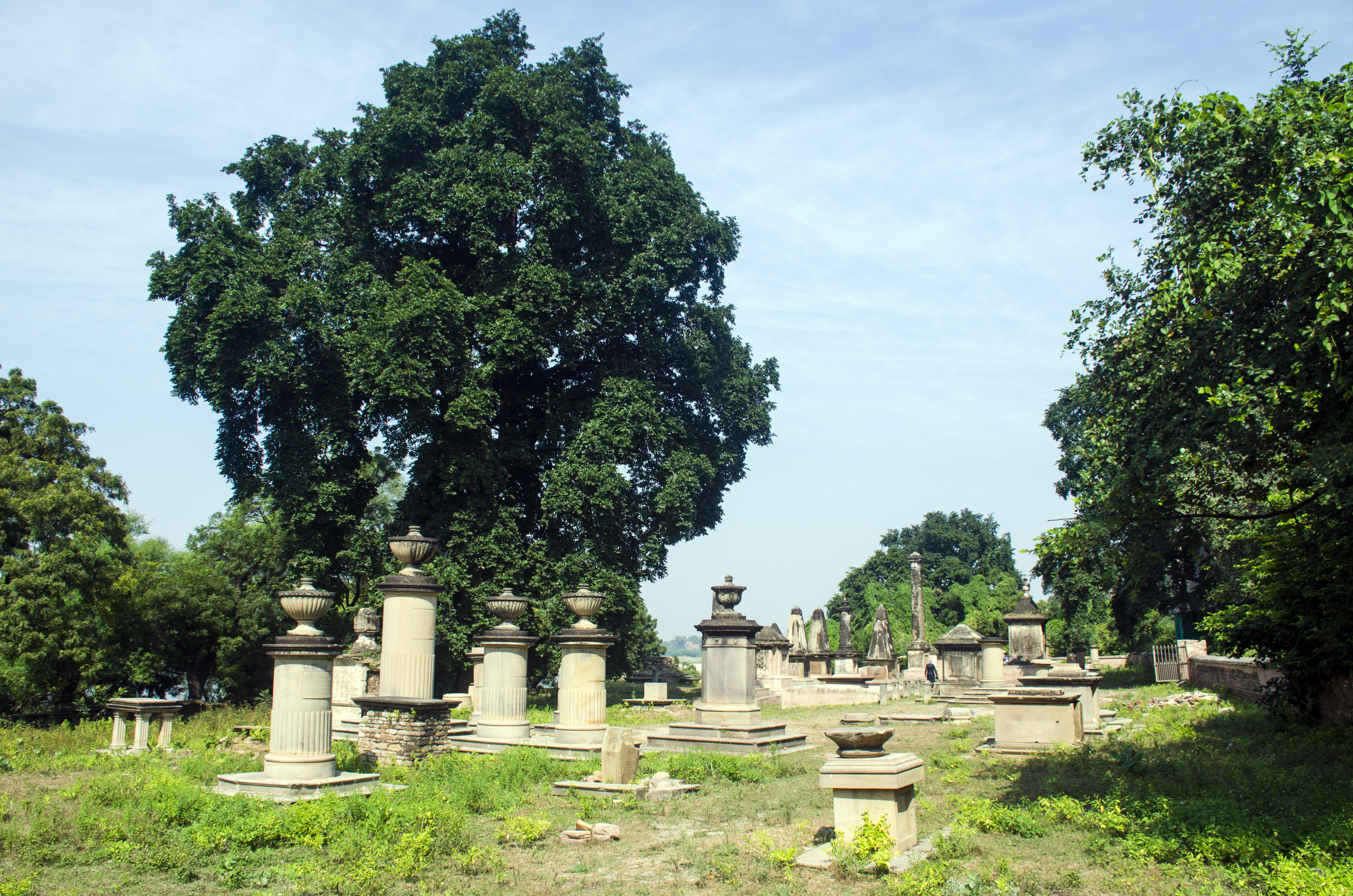
- Graves in Chunar Cemetery
- Interactive map of British Cemetery, Chunar

Details
- Location: Chunar, Mirzapur district, Uttar Pradesh
- Country: India
- Type: Christian cemetery

British Cemetery, Chunar is a British colonial cemetery situated at Chunar in Mirzapur district in the Indian state of Uttar Pradesh.

== History ==
Chunar was captured by the British East India Company in 1763 and Chunar Fort near the Ganges became an important military base. Beside the fort, this cemetery was consequently established for European officers, civil servants and members of their families who died at Chunar. After Indian independence in 1947, the cemetery ceased to function and remains a historic monument. Archaeological Survey of India has undertaken the abandoned cemetery.

== Gallery ==
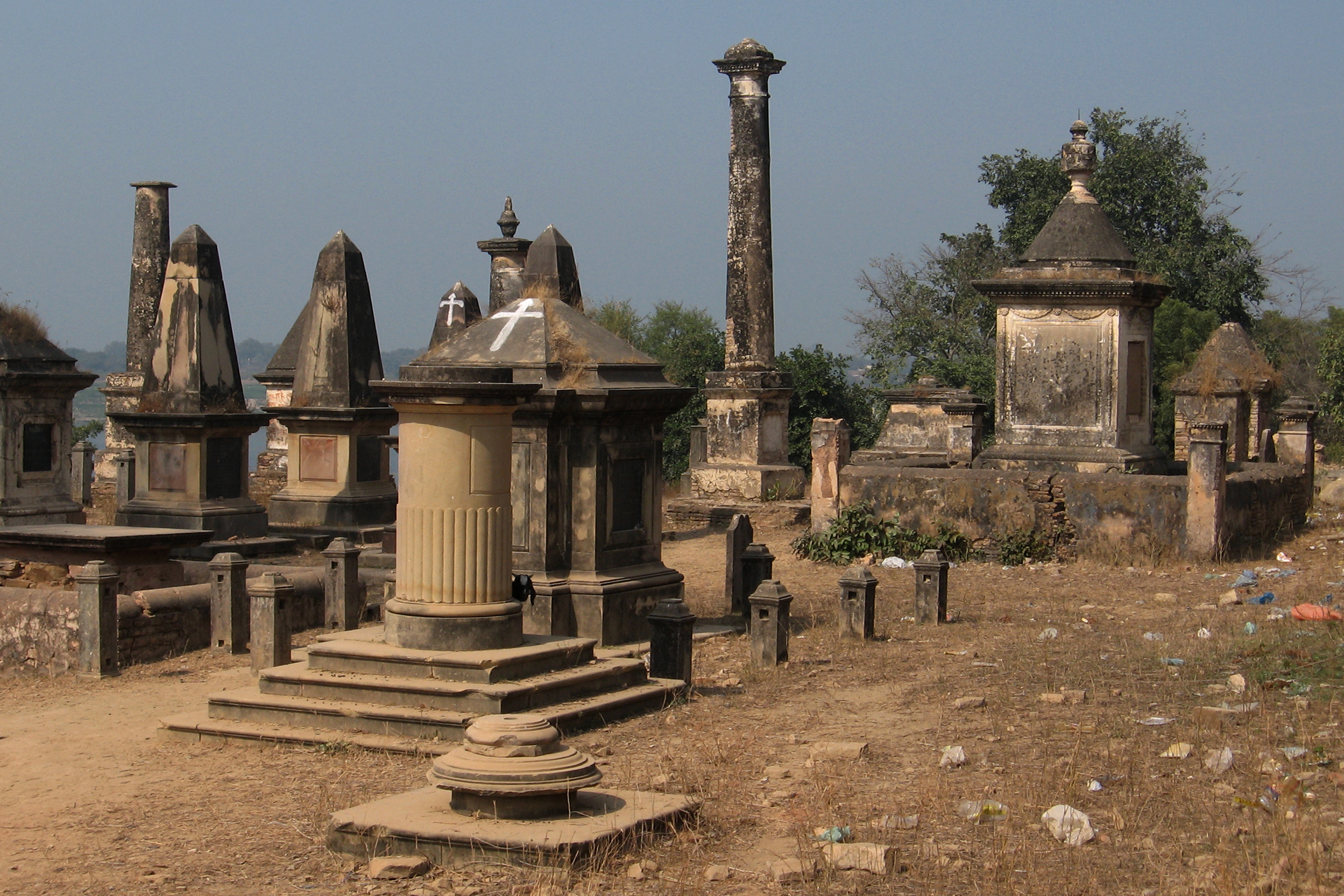

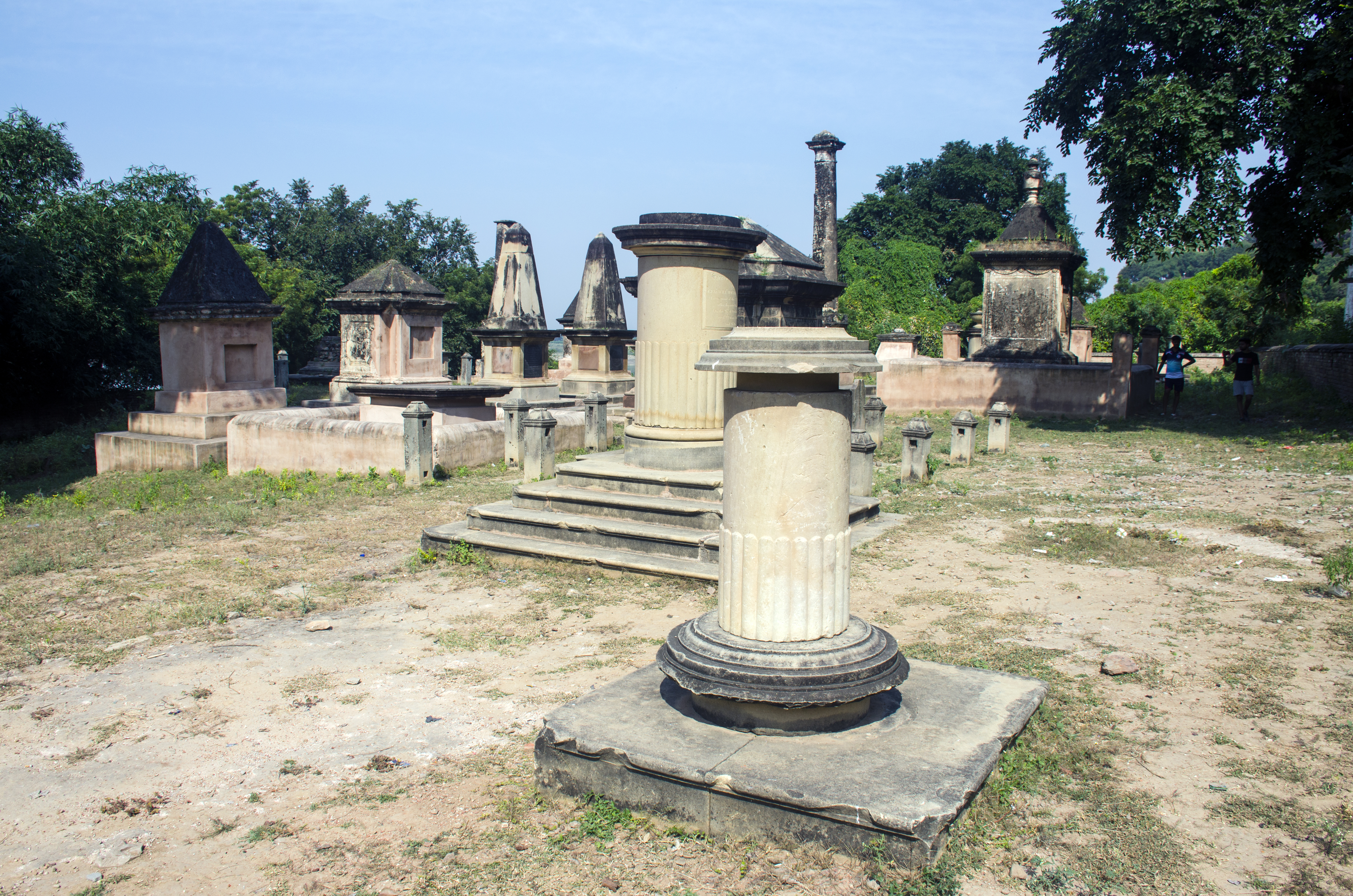

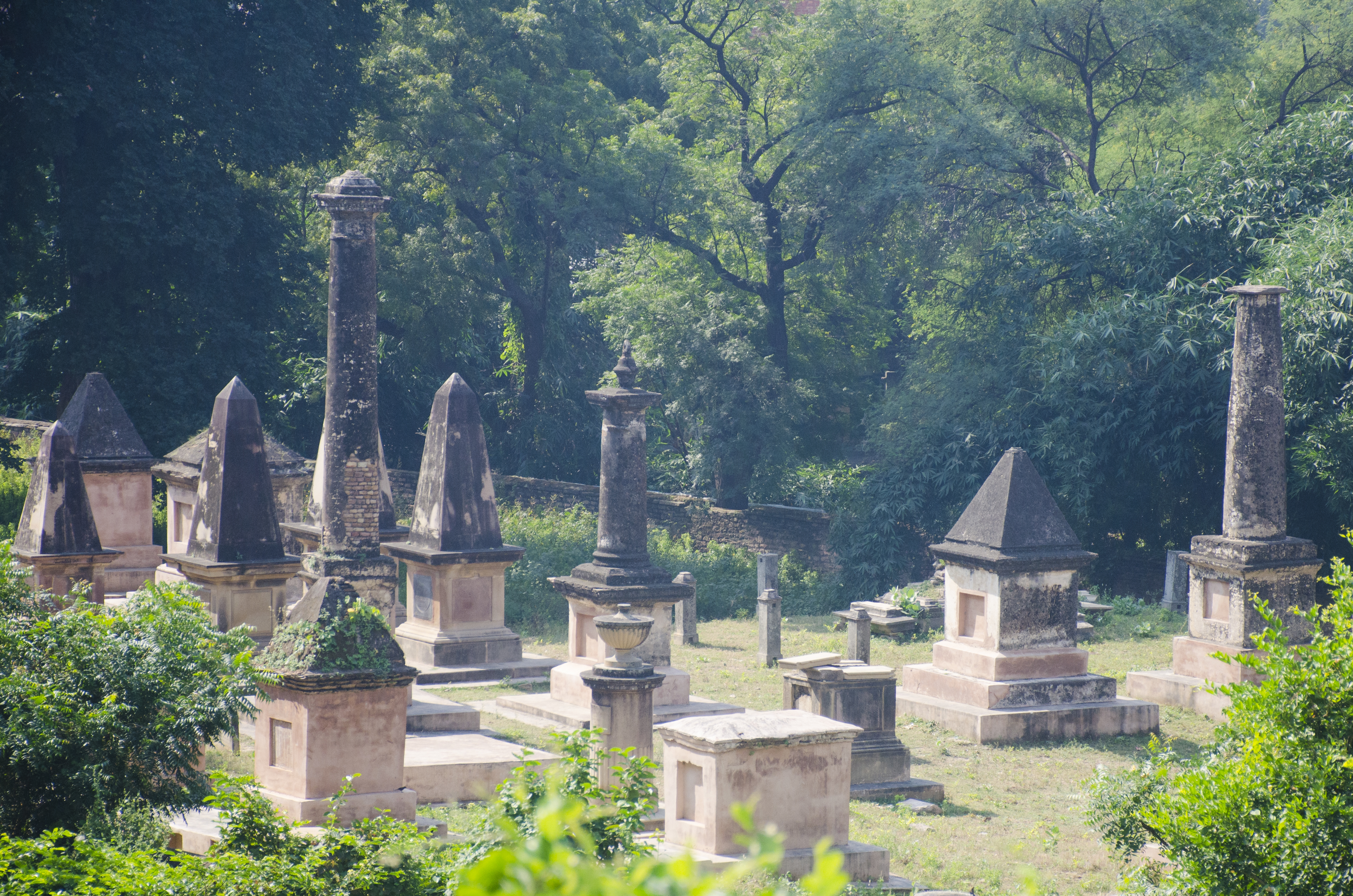

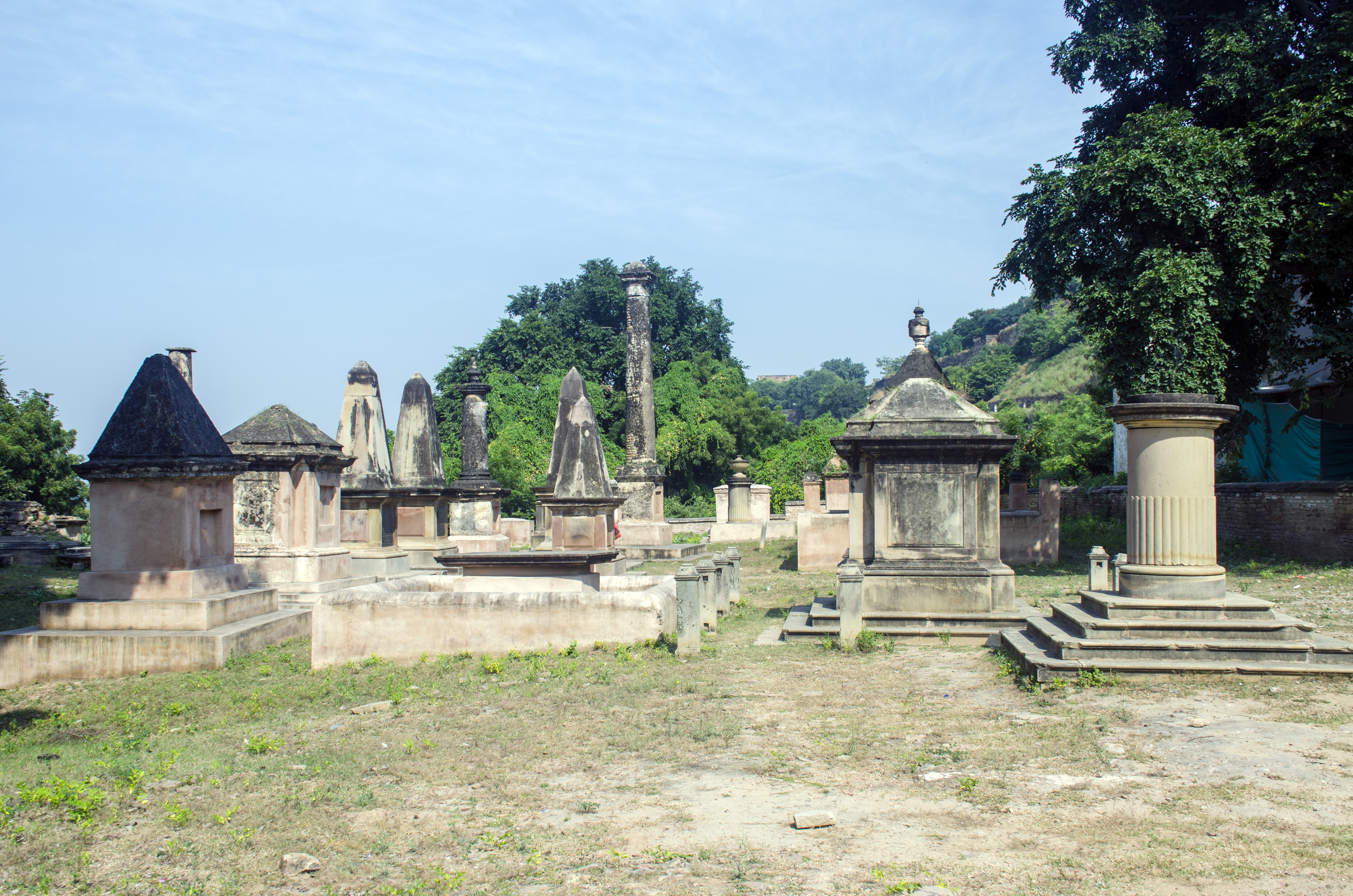
