= Gatiali =

- Village
- Location in Pakistan
- Coordinates: 32°35′38″N 72°56′36″E
- Country: Pakistan
- Province: Punjab
- District: Jhelum District
- Time zone: UTC+5 (PST)
  - Summer (DST): +6

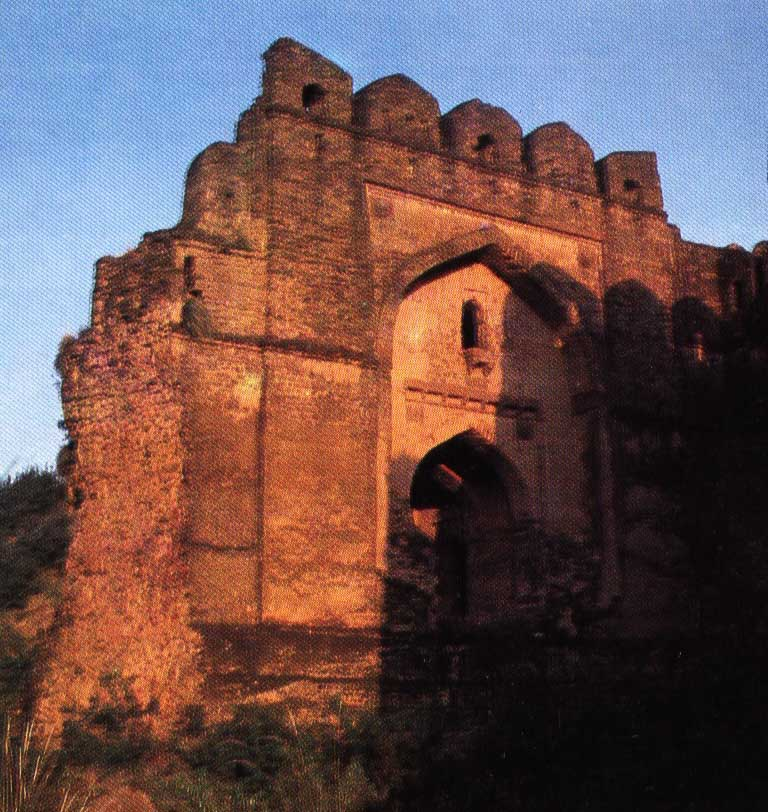
Gatiali Gate

Gatiali (or Patan Gatiali or Gatiyalian) is a village in Jhelum District, Punjab, Pakistan. It is located north of Jhelum city and South of Mangla Dam.

Today a small village on the west Jhelum River bank in Punjab, in fact in east of Gatiali's land there is only border of Azad Kashmir. Importance of this small village in the history is not known but the Road from Jhelum to Mangla on the River Jhelum's West bank Called Jhelum-Gatiali-Shekhupura Road (Shekhupura is a village on Mangla Dina Road where is the link).

The famous project of bridge on Jhelum River to link the Azad Kashmir with Pakistan directly is located near to Gatiali Village and Called Pull Patan Gatyalian.

Another evidence is the Gatiali Gate in Rohtas Fort. It is a single gate 9.15 metres high and 6.1 metres deep. This gate faces to the village Gatali Ford (ravine) which is called also Patan Gatiali or Gatiyalian, the important point to cross the River Jhelum for the Kashmir Valley, thus the name.

== Castes and clans ==
Rajputs of the Sohlan are Muslims and basic residents and proprietors of the village. Kashmiries they are living in the village since 1920. There was some evidence of presence of some Hindu (Khatri) families but at the time of the partition of India, they left the Village.
