= Chaudharipur =

Chaudharipur Chaudharipur
- Village
- Location within Uttar Pradesh
- Coordinates: 25.15°N 82.87°E
- Country: India
- State: Uttar Pradesh
- District: Mirzapur
- Elevation: 163 m (535 ft)

Population (2001)
  - Total: 1,280

Languages
  - Official: Hindi, English, Urdu
- Time zone: UTC+5:30 (IST)
- PIN: 231304
- Telephone code: 05443
- Vehicle registration: UP 63
- Sex ratio: 0.926 (2011) ♂/♀
- Literacy: 77.05 (2011)%

Chaudharipur is a village, part of Tehsil Chunar, in the Mirzapur district of the Indian state of Uttar Pradesh.

Approximately 1,000 people live in the area.

The main school for Chaudharypur is PDND Inter College Chunar. The main crops are chili and potatoes.

The village is under the Basaratapur panchayat.

== Geography ==
The nearest town to the village is Chunar, about 3 km away. The nearest major city is Varanasi, approximately 25 km away, and is considered one of the holiest cities in the country. It is situated on the left bank of the river Ganges.

== Climate ==
Chaudharipur experiences a humid subtropical climate (Köppen climate classification Cwa) with large variations between summer and winter. Summers are long, from early April to October, with intervening monsoon seasons and are extremely hot, even by South Asian standards. The temperature ranges between 22°C – 46 °C (72°F – 115 °F) in the summers. Winters in this place see large diurnal variations, with warm days and downright cold nights. Cold waves from the Himalayan region cause temperatures to dip across the city in the winter from December to February and temperatures below 5 °C are not uncommon. The average annual rainfall is 1,110 mm (44 in). Fog is common in the winters, while hot dry winds, called loo, blow in the summers.

Through a combination of water pollution, new constructions of upstream dams, and increase in the local temperature, the water level of the Ganges has recently gone down significantly, and small islands have become visible in the middle of the river.

17 May 2012 was the hottest day of the season so far with mercury soaring up to 45.6 °C.
