= Niyamatpurkala =

Village in Uttar Pradesh, India

Niyamatpurkala is a village in Mirzapur, Uttar Pradesh, India.
