= Rohtas Fort =

Historical fort in Dina, Pakistan

Rohtas Fort روہتاس قلعہ قلعہِ روہتاس
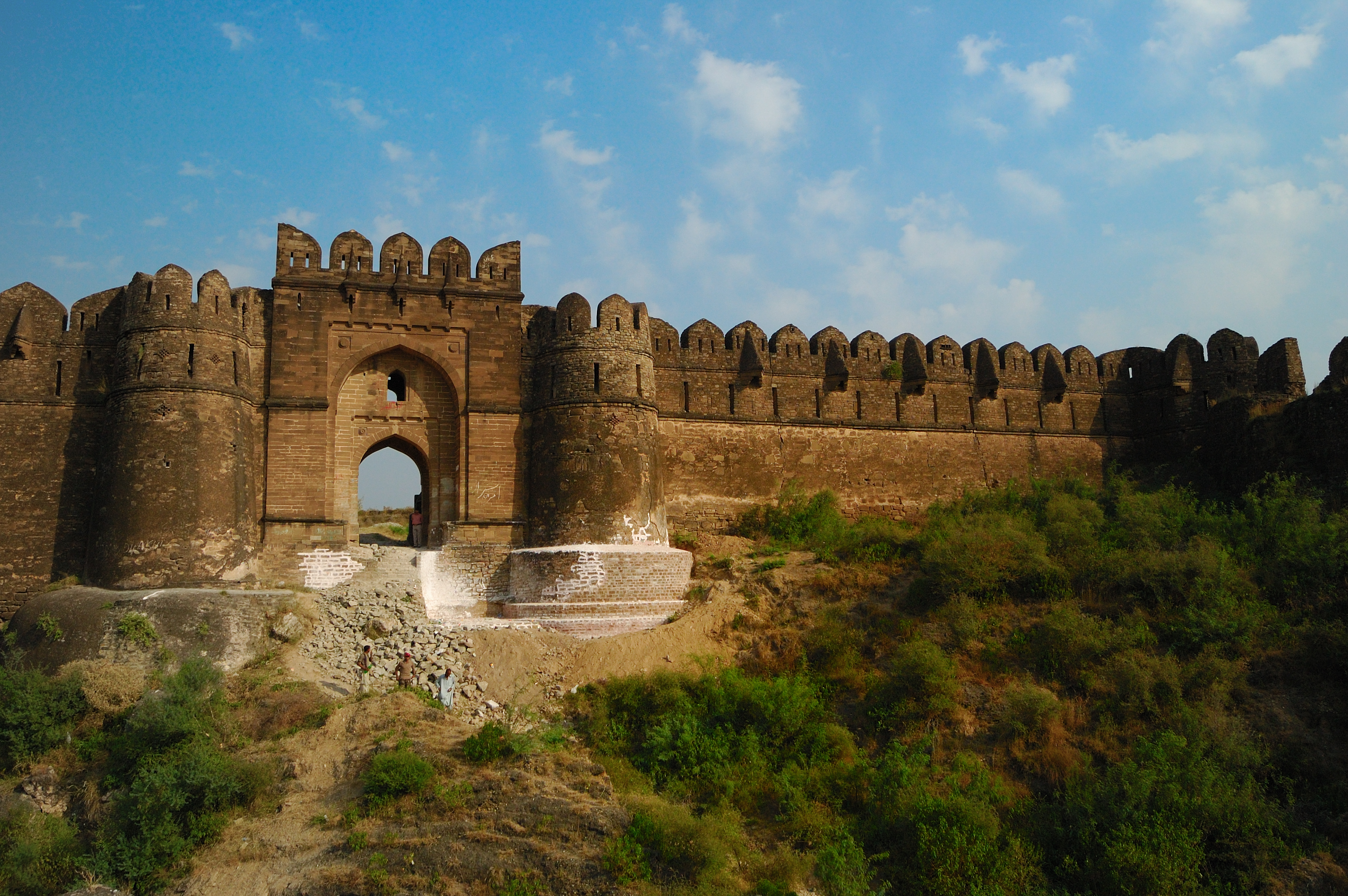
- Kabuli gate of Rohtas Fort
- Interactive map of Rohtas Fort روہتاس قلعہ قلعہِ روہتاس
- 32°58′7″N 73°34′31″E
- Location: Dina, Punjab, Pakistan

History
- Built: 1540

Site notes
- Architectural style: Indo-Islamic
- Owner: Sur Empire (1540–1556); Mughal Empire (1566–1752); Durrani Empire (1752–1767); Gakhars under the suzerainty of Sukerchakia Misl (1767–1799); Sikh Empire (1799–1849); British East India Company (1849–1858); British Indian Empire (1858–1947); Central Government of Pakistan (1947–present)

UNESCO World Heritage Site
- Type: Cultural
- Criteria: ii, iv
- Designated: 1997
- Reference no.: 586

Rohtas Fort (Punjabi: روہتاس قلعہ, romanized: Rohtās Qillā; Urdu: قلعہِ روہتاس, romanized: Qilā-e-Rohtās) is a 16th-century fortress located near the city of Dina in Jhelum district of the Punjab province, Pakistan. Commissioned by Sur emperor Sher Shah Suri, its construction was supervised by Raja Todar Mal and is now one of the largest and most formidable forts in Punjab.

The fort remains remarkably intact and was declared a UNESCO World Heritage Site in 1997. UNESCO called it an "exceptional example of the Muslim military architecture of Central and South Asia." Over one-third of the fortress area is occupied by the Rohtas village, inhabited continuously since the times of Islam Shah Suri, making Rohtas one of the few living forts in the world.

== Location ==
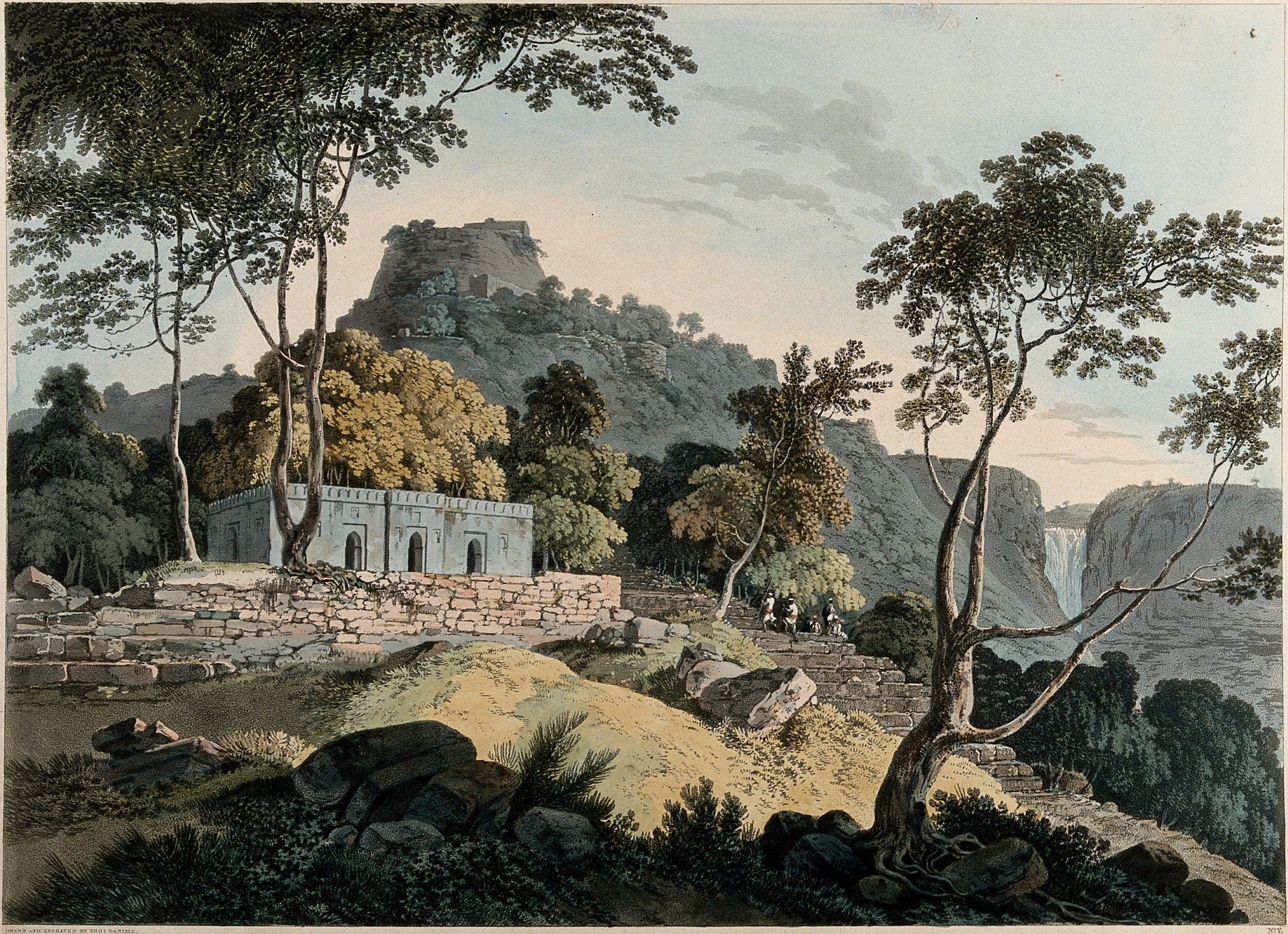
"Raje Gaut, the principal road to Rotas Ghur" engraving by Thomas Daniell, 1795

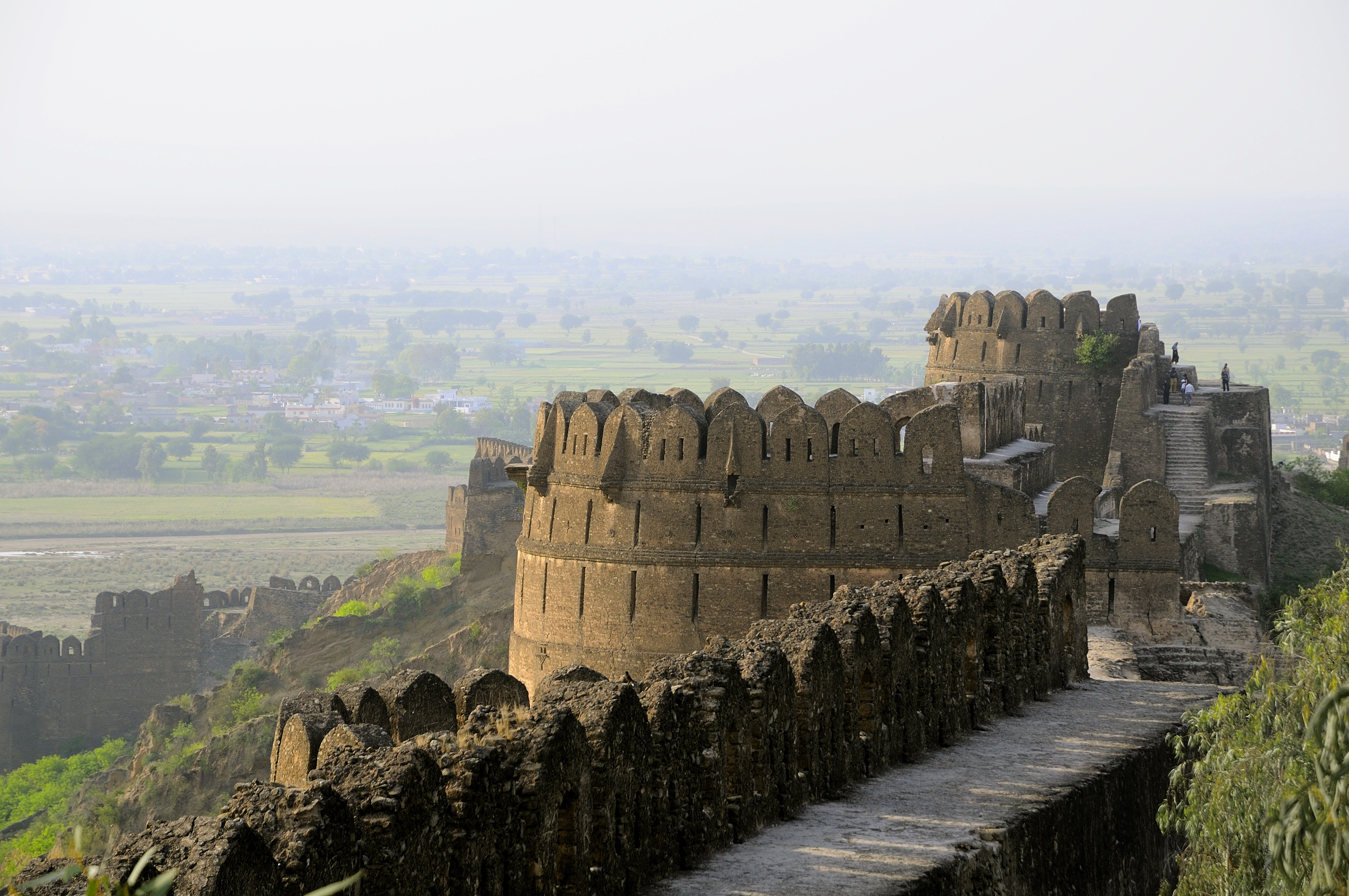
Rohtas Fort was built upon a hill overlooking the Gaggar Khurd.

Rohtas Fort is approximately 16 kilometres (9.9 mi) northwest of Jhelum near the city of Dina. The fort is 3 kilometres (1.9 mi) from Khukha and Gaggar Khurd and 8 kilometres (5.0 mi) south of the Grand Trunk Road, one of Asia's oldest roads. The historic Badshahi Road once passed along the northern outer wall of the fort.

Rohtas Fort is situated on a hill in the Tilla Jogian Range, overlooking a gorge where the Kahān River meets a seasonal stream called Parnal Khas. The fort is positioned 91.5 metres (300 ft) above its surroundings. It is 819 metres (2,687 ft) above sea level and covers an area of 70 hectares (170 acres).

Located at the northern edge of the Rohtas Fort, near the fort's Talaqi gate, is Gurdwara Chowa Sahib.

== History ==
=== Sur period ===
Sher Shah Suri, the founder of the Sur Empire, commissioned the Rohtas Fort on the advice of his finance minister Todar Mal, and adopted a scorched earth strategy to defeat the rebellious warring Gakhar, a local tribe who were providing bold resistance to the Surs, near the Salt Range region in Punjab. Thus the idea of the Rohtas Fort was conceived, with Sher Shah laying down the foundation of the fort. The fort occupied a strategic position between the mountains of Pothohar and the plains of Punjab, preventing Humayun from returning to India from his exile in Persia. Its name celebrated the Sher Shah Suri's 1539 capture of the Rohtas Fort in the Shahabad district of Bihar from a local Hindu prince.

The construction of Rohtas Fort started in 1541 under the supervision of Todar Mal, himself a Punjabi from Lahore. However, its construction soon stopped when the local Gakhar population was unwilling to work on the construction due to all the male tribesmen taking a vow to not cooperate with the Surs lest be threatened with excommunication or expulsion. Thus Todar Mal was not able to find even one labourer to help him in the construction of the fort. This was the case until he under the orders of Sher Shah raised the workers' wages to such a degree that many of the Gakhars became willing to help with the fort's construction. Sher Shah Suri did not live to see its completion as he died in 1545 before the fort was completed.

=== Mughal period ===
With Sher Shah Suri's death, Humayun returned to regain his rule of the Punjab region. Rohtas Fort was ceded to Humayun in 1555. As a result, the fort lost much of its defensive significance. It was never popular with the Mughals because of its plain military style and lack of gardens. In the 1580s, Emperor Akbar constructed the nearby Attock Fort that was a better fit to Mughal interests.

Akbar only stayed at Rohtas Fort for a single night. Emperor Jahangir rested there for one night while traveling to Kashmir. He noted, "This fort was founded in a cleft and the strength of it cannot be imagined." Later, after his victorious return from a forced exile in Kabul, Jahangir convened his court at Rohtas Fort for a short time.

During the Mughal era, the fort was used almost continuously until 1707. The Afsharid ruler Nader Shah camped at the fort during his invasion of the Mughal Empire. After that, it was used by the Afghan Durrani Emperor Ahmad Shah Durrani during his invasions of Punjab against the Sikhs.

=== Sikh period ===
In 1767 Charat Singh, the grandfather of Ranjit Singh, captured the fort from its Durrani governor. He entrusted it to a Gakhar chief Raja Ghias-ud-Din. Ghias-ud-Din was succeeded by his cousin Raja Nur Khan who held the post for 30 years. Gurmukh Singh Lamba captured Rohtas Fort in 1825 from Raja Nur Khan. Raja Fazal Din Khan was the last to use Rohtas Fort for military purposes when he participated in a successful rebellion led by Sher Singh in the late 1830s; however, the fort never saw any fighting. The Sikh Empire used the fort for administrative purposes until the British took over the region in 1849.

== Architecture ==
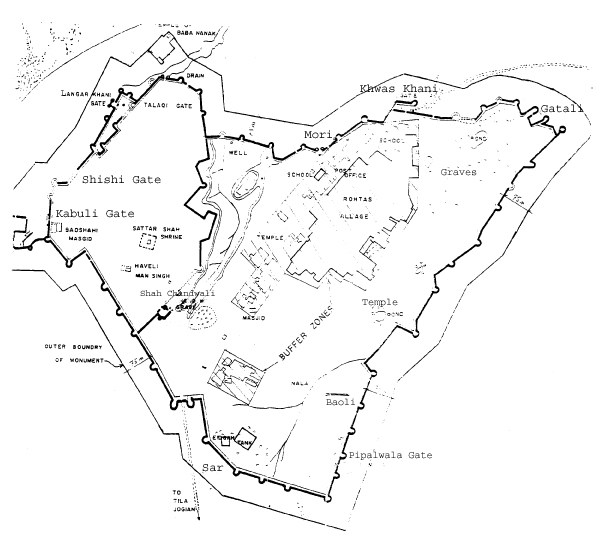
Layout of the fort

The designers of Rohtas Fort valued function over form. Its style draws from Turkish, Middle Eastern, and South Asian artistic traditions.

=== Layout ===
Rohtas Fort covers an area of 70 hectares (170 acres), enclosed by 4 kilometres (2.5 mi) of walls. It has bastion towers and twelve monumental gates that provide access to the inner fort. The fort is an irregularly shaped triangle and follows the contours of its hill. The northwest corner of the fort is walled off from the rest of the structure by a 533-metre-long (1,749 ft) wall. The enclosed section served as a citadel for elites. It could hold up to 30,000 men.

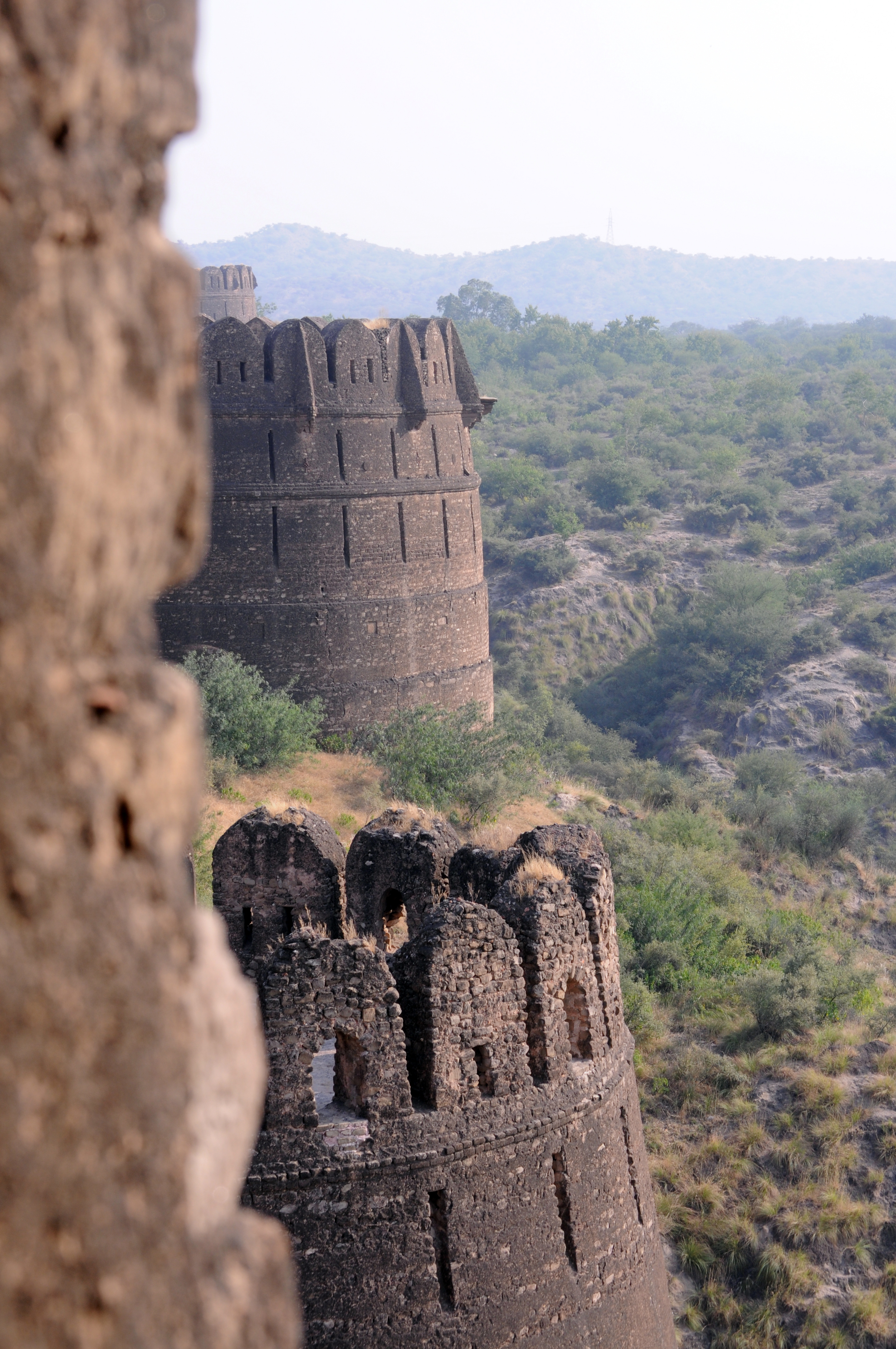
The fort's defenses were bolstered by large bastions.

=== Ramparts ===
The fort's walls are built in sandstone laid in lime mortar mixed with brick. The height of the outer wall varies between 10 and 18 metres (33 and 59 ft) with a thickness between 10 and 13 metres (33 and 43 ft). The fortified walls have 68 bastion towers at irregular intervals. The ramparts follow the hilltop's contours.

The fort's wall had up to three terraces at different levels, connected by staircases. The uppermost terrace has merlon-shaped battlements from which soldiers could fire muskets and pour molten lead. In addition, the fort has hundreds of machicolations, each beautifully decorated with geometric patterns. These small drains led from the interior to the exterior walls so the soldiers could pour molten lead or other hot liquids on invaders trying to scale the fort's walls.

=== Gates ===
Rohtas Fort has 14 gates built of grey ashlar stone.

==== Sohail ====
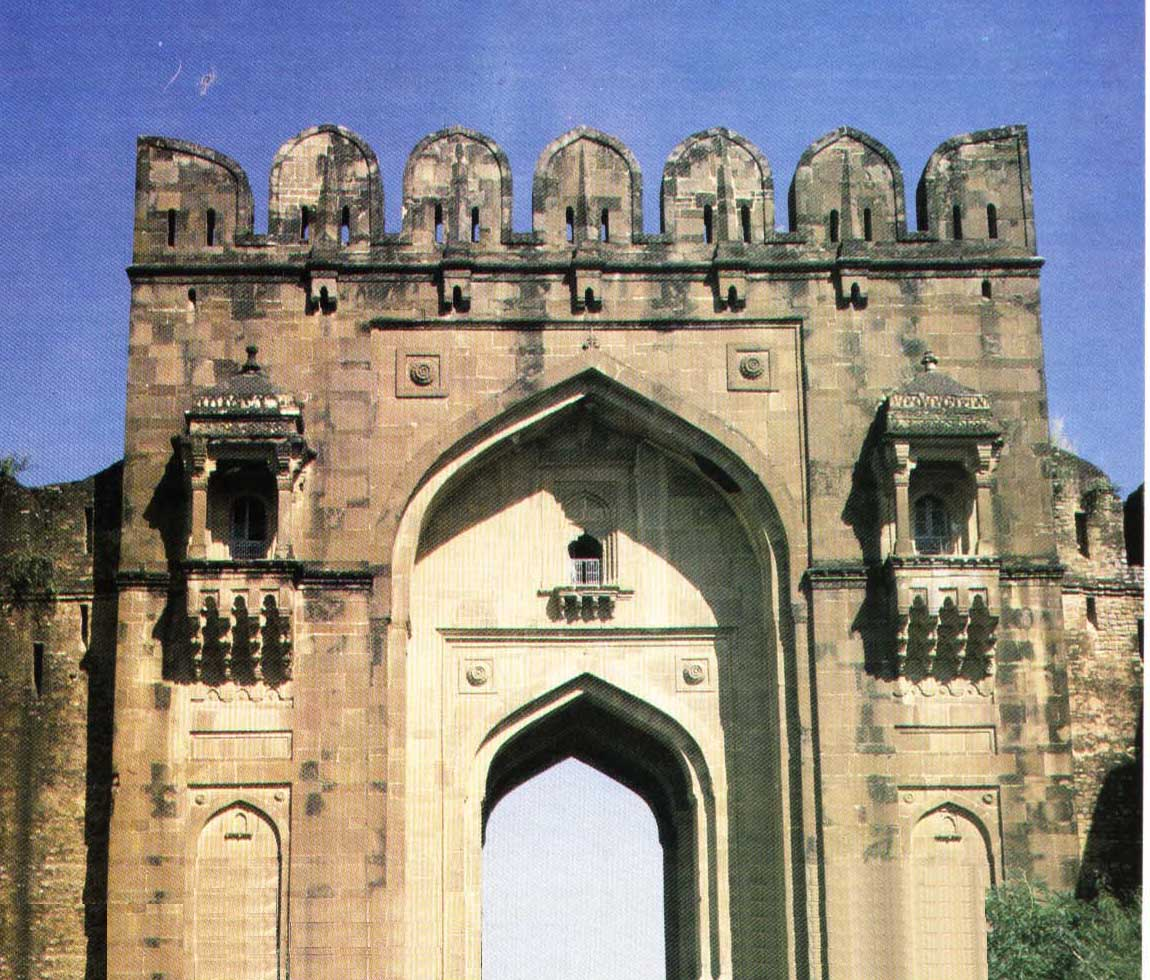
Sohail gate

Sohail gate features some of the best masonry work of the Sur Empire and was likely the ceremonial main entrance to the fort. Its namesake is the local saint, Sohail Bukhari, interred in the southwestern portion of the gate.

This rectangular gate measures 21.34 metres (70.0 feet) high by 20.73 metres (68.0 feet) wide, and with a depth of 15 metres (49 feet). Its central archway is 4.72 metres (15.5 feet) wide and maintains its shape throughout the depth of the gate. The gateway has ornamental floral motifs with richer decorations on its outer face. There are seven battlements along the outer face of the Sohail gate. A room on the upper floor has windows that open toward the fort's interior. There is also a small window in the middle of the inner arch.

==== Shah Chandwali ====
Shah Chandwali is a double gate that links the citadel to the main fort. The outer gate is an entrance from the citadel. It is 13.3 metres (44 ft) wide and 8.23 metres (27.0 ft) deep. The inner gate is a simple archway 3.66 metres (12.0 ft) wide. Its namesake is Shah Chandwali, a saint who refused wages for working on this gate. He died while working on the gate's construction and is buried nearby. His shrine still stands.

==== Kabuli ====
Kabuli gate opens to the northwest in the general direction of Kabul, Afghanistan, its namesake. The gate now houses a visitors' information center and a museum set up by the Himalayan Wildlife Foundation.

The gate may have been built in two stages. It consists of an inner and outer gate that encloses a stepwell. Its opening is 3.15 meters (10.3 feet) wide and is flanked by two bastions on either side. The gate has five battlements on top, with stairs leading up the outside wall. South of the gate is the Shahi Mosque, so many call it the Shahi Darwaza.

==== Shishi ====
Shishi gate derives its name from the glazed tiles that decorate its outer arch. These blue tiles are the earliest known examples of this technique, later refined in Lahore. A carved calligraphy inscription to the left of the gate gives the date of construction of the fort. The Persian inscription says:

In the Hijri Year 948 [1541 CE] came the exalted
At that time constructed the great fort
The Emperor is Sher, with long life
There is no match to his good fortune
It was completed by Shahu Sultan.

==== Langar Khani ====
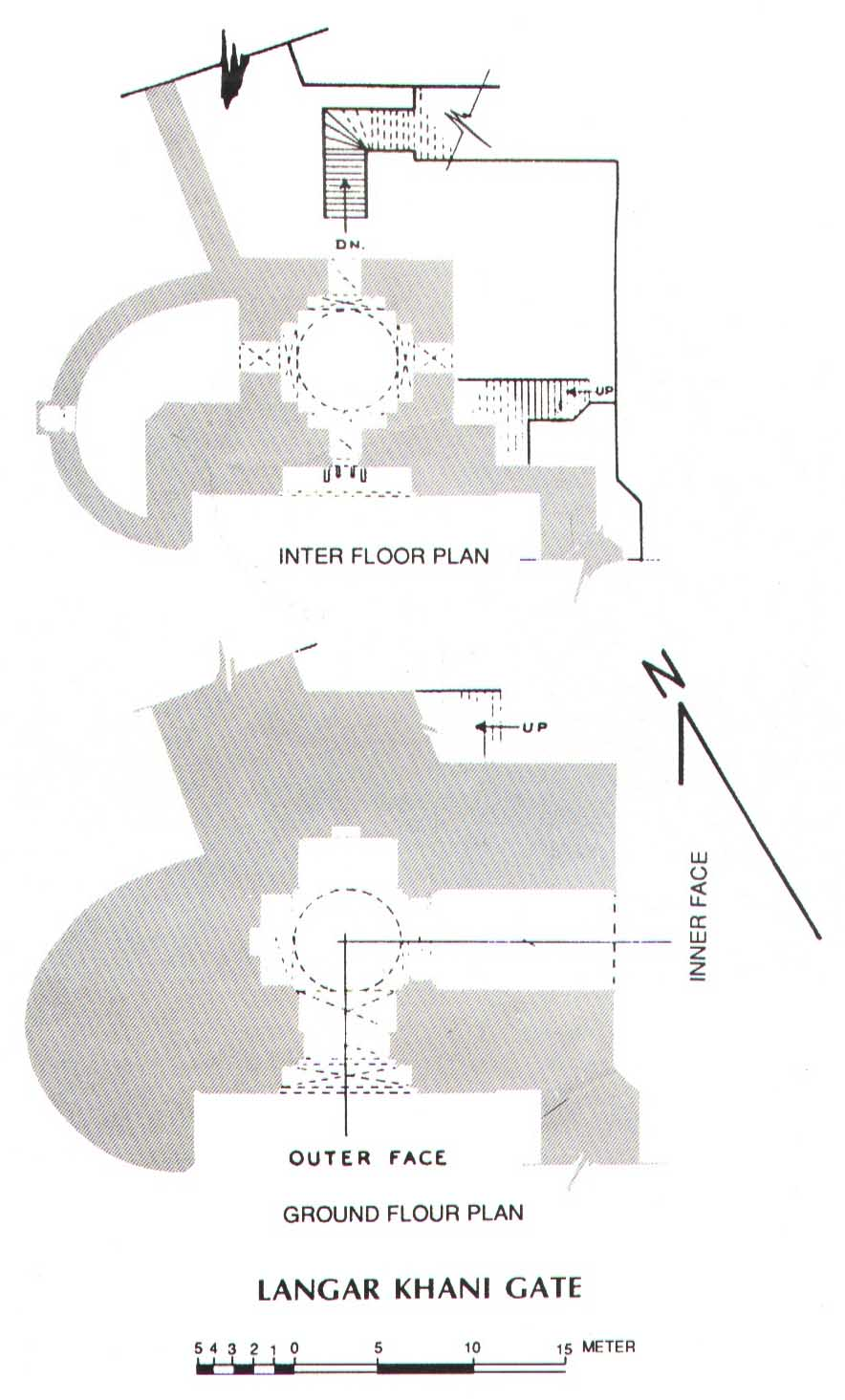
Langar Khani gate plan

Langar Khani gate opens directly into the citadel but was designed as a trap in the direct line of fire from the fort's bastions. It is a double gate with a central arched opening that is 15.25 meters (50.0 feet) high and 3.5 meters (11 feet) wide. The outer arch has a small window like Sohail Gate. The external opening leads to a Langar Khana (kitchen). Two bastions on either side of the gate include kitchens, stores, and a well for water. The opening of this gate is L-shaped, requiring a turn to the right after entering. It is decorated with carved calligraphy inscriptions.

==== Talaqi ====
Talaqi gate has two bastions on each side. It is 15.25 metres (50.0 ft) high and 13.8 metres (45 ft) wide. This gate features a duplicate of the carved calligraphy inscription on Shishi gate. The origin of the name Talaqi is unknown. Some say the gate's name is a derivative of "Talaq", meaning divorce. According to another legend, Prince Sabir Suri entered this gate and had a fatal attack of fever. His death was regarded as a bad omen, giving the gate its name of "Talaqi".

==== Mori ====
The Mori gate opens to the north and faces towards Kashmir. As a result, it is also called Kashmiri gate. Morigate opens into one chamber, which opens into another.

==== Khwas Khani ====
Khwas Khani is a double gate named after one of Sher Shah Suri's greatest generals, Khawas Khan Marwat. It was the original main entrance to the fort from the Grand Trunk Road, famously known as GT Road. The outer gate is 12.8 meters (42 feet) wide and 8 meters (26 feet) deep. The outer gate has a bastion, five battlements at its top, and flanking defensive walls with cannons. All of the battlements have loopholes and machicolations.

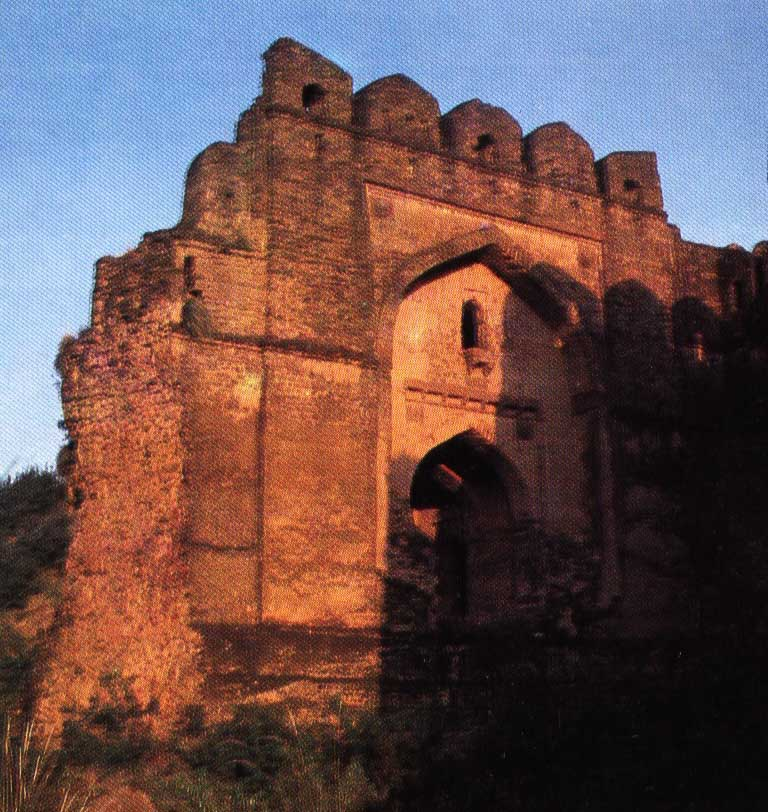
Gatali gate

The inner and outer gates are almost mirrored images. The inner side of Khwas Khani also has five battlements, making it unique amongst the fort's inner gates. The inner and outer arches have calligraphy inscriptions and sunflower motifs like Sohail gate. The inner gate also has a room with windows that open to the inside and the outside. It is accessible by only one gate and has a fine stepwell, suggesting it was for the royal family.

==== Gatali ====
Gatali is a single gate that is 9.15 metres (30.0 ft) high and 6.1 metres (20 ft) deep. It faces the village Gatali ford, also called Patan Gatiali or Gatiyalian, the critical point to cross the Jhelum River for the Kashmir Valley. Gatali gate is decorated with carved calligraphy inscriptions.

==== Sar ====
Sar is a small entrance that seems to have been made by locals knocking down the main wall (outer boundary) as a passage to the adjacent jungle. There is a bastion next to this gate. Because the now dilapidated pond in front of this gate has existed since the fort's beginning, the entrance is called Sar gate (water pond).

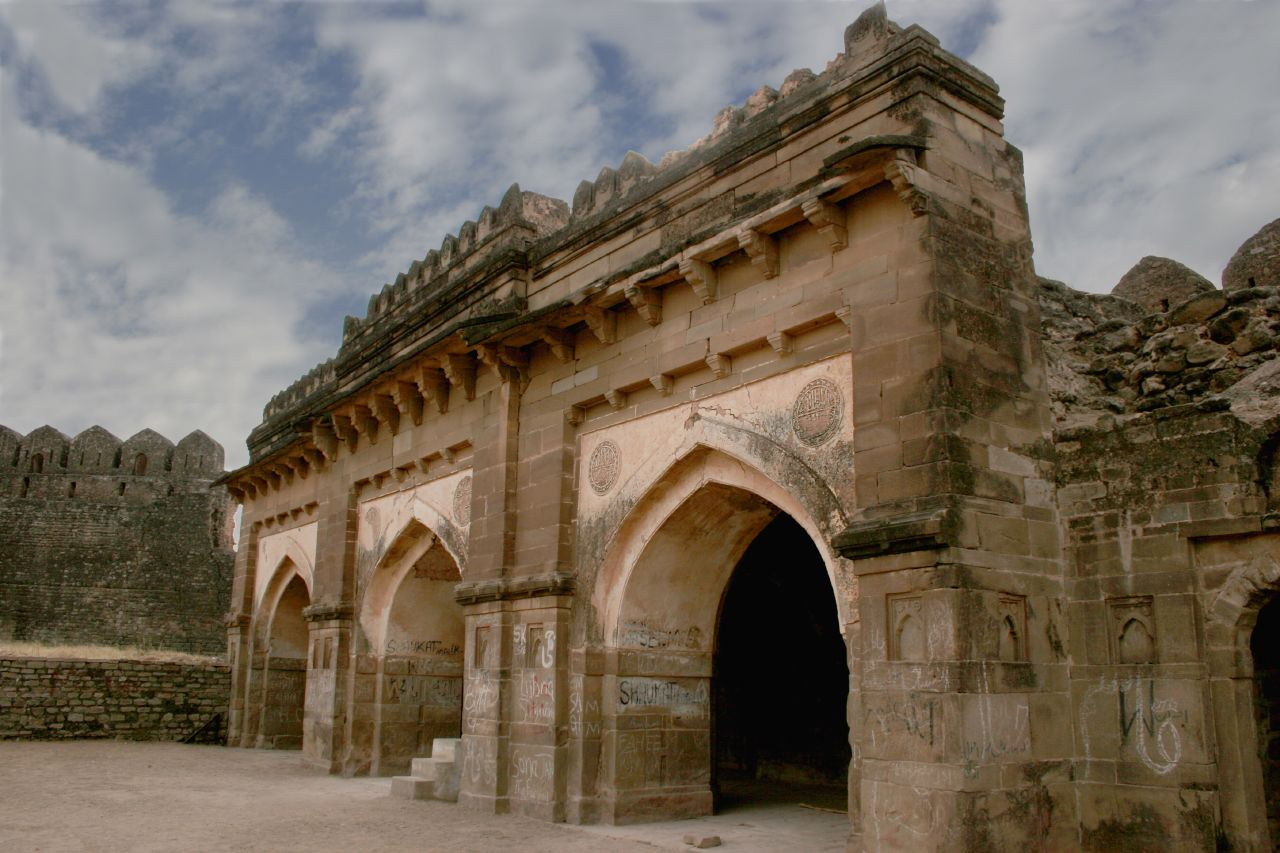
Remains of the Shahi Masjid or Royal mosque

==== Tulla Mori and Pippli ====
Tulla Mori and Pippli are entrances rather than gates. Tulla Mori is on the eastern side of the fort and has an adjacent bastion. It is 2 metres (6.6 ft) wide. Pippli is 2.13 metres (7.0 ft).

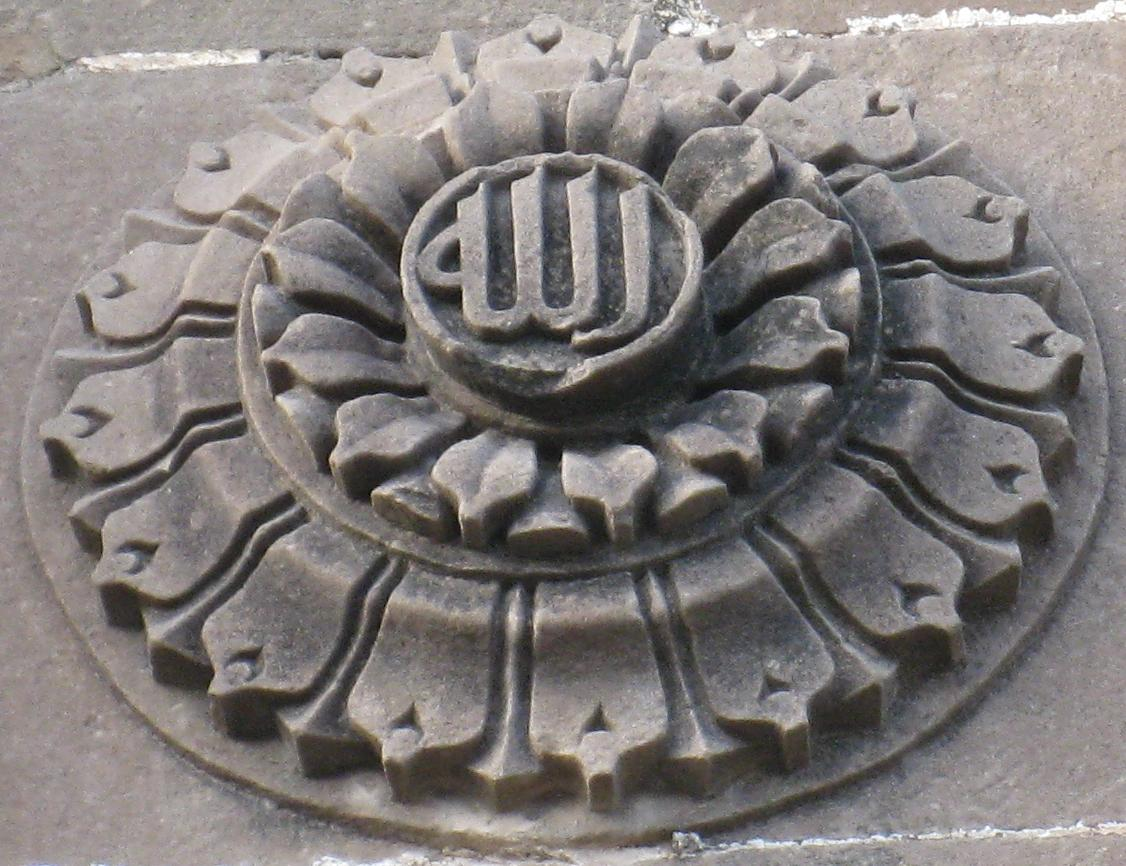
Shahi Masjid stone sunflower with the inscription "Allah"

=== Royal mosque ===
The small Shahi Masjid (Royal mosque) is near the Kabuli gate and is the most decorated of the fort's original buildings.

The mosque includes a prayer chamber and a small courtyard. Stairs lead from the courtyard to the top of the Kabuli gate. The mosque's outer wall is also the fortification wall, meaning soldiers walked over the mosque's roof.

The prayer chamber is 19.2 metres (63 ft) long and 7.3 metres (24 ft) deep. It has three equal sections with domed ceilings that are not visible from outside the structure. The Pesh Imam (prayer leader) had a small room at the end of the prayer chamber. This room has a small interior domed roof, also not visible from outside the mosque. The mosque lacks a place for ablution (cleaning up before prayers).

The mosque has decorative stone carvings featuring a sunflower motif and calligraphy engravings. One such carving is outside the Pesh Imam and features the word "Allah" in Arabic calligraphy. The merlons on top of the Shahi Mosque have the same carving. The sunflower motif is also on each side of the arches of the Shahi Mosque and the guard posts between each gate. There are round carvings of the Six Kalimas in Naskh script, surrounded by lilies, on the mosque's outer wall.

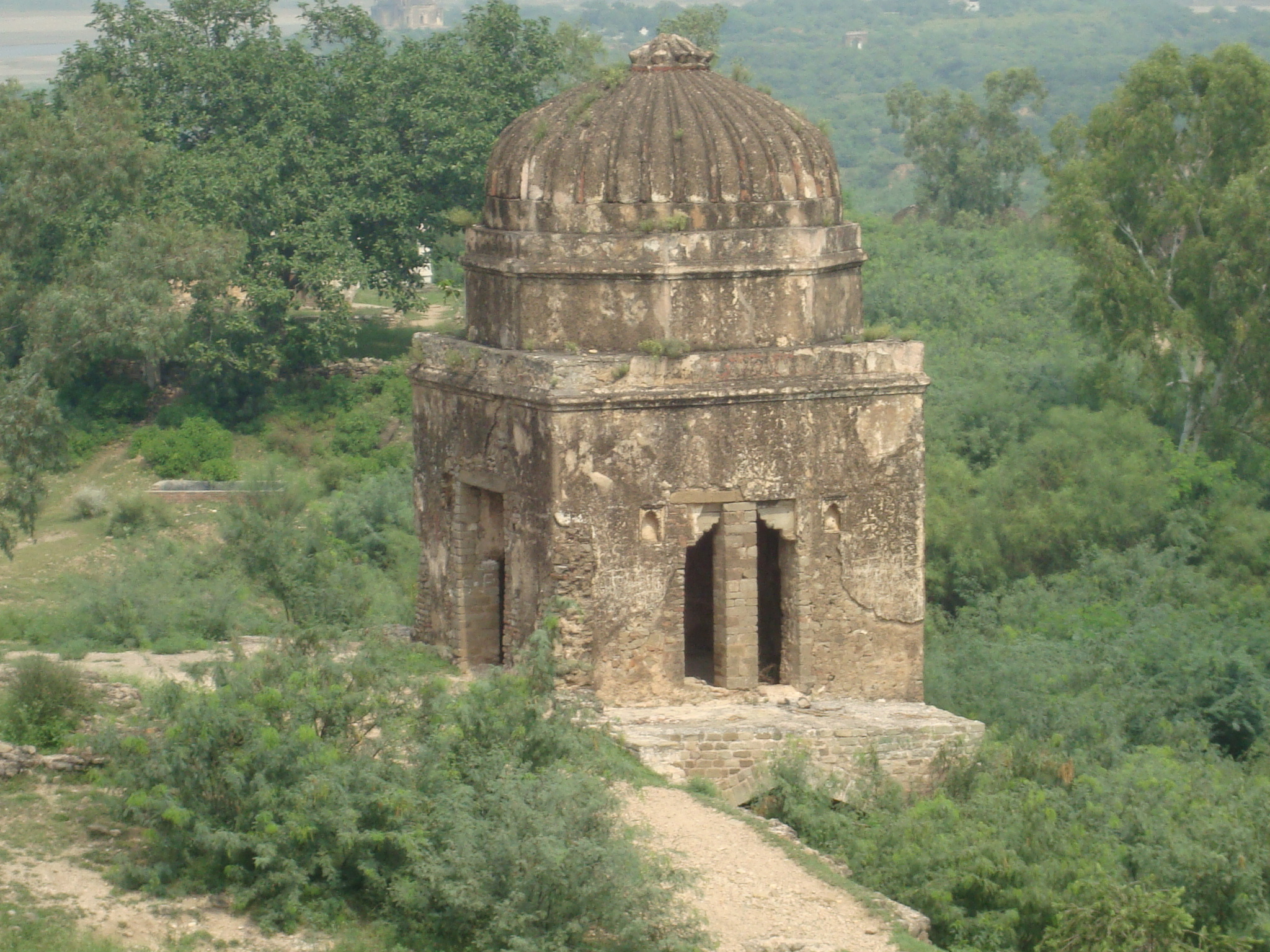
Rani Mahai or Queen's Palace

=== Palace ===
The Raja Man Singh Haveli, located on the highest point of the citadel, is the fort's only palace. The Rani Mahal (Queen's palace) is a one-story structure inside the fort. It originally had four rooms, but only one room remains today. The room is 2.45 by 2.45 metres (8.0 by 8.0 ft) square. It is 6.1 metres (20 ft) high and beautifully decorated inside and outside. The inside of the roof has decorative flowers, geometrical patterns, and fake windows. The stone dome roof is carved on the exterior to resemble a flower.

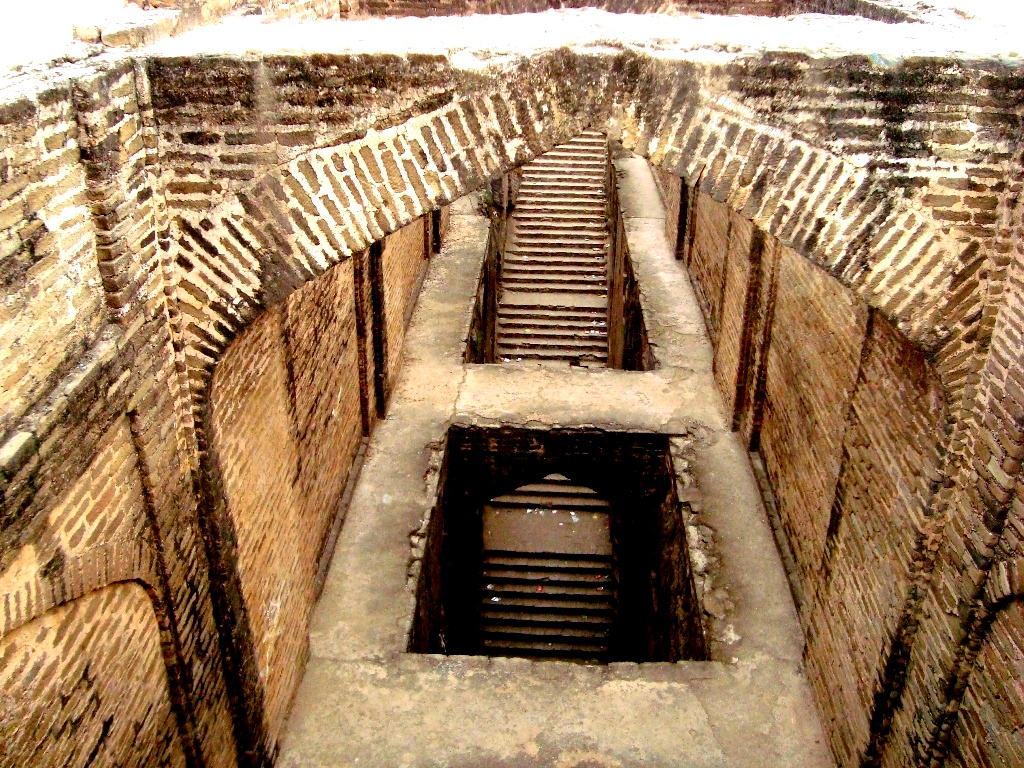
Central stepwell

=== Stepwells ===
There are three baolis or stepwells in the fort, made by cutting deep into the limestone. The central baoli is in the middle of the fort and served soldiers, elephants, and horses. This baoli has 148 steps. Each step is 20 cm (8 in) wide. Three arches span its length.

The royal baoli is near the Kabuli gate. It has 60 steps and small chambers used as baths by the royal family. The Sar gate baoli, located near the Sar gate, is smaller and was most likely used by soldiers.

== Legacy and conservation ==
Rohtas Fort was designated a World Heritage Site in 1997, having met the following inclusion criteria:

- Criterion (ii): "Rohtas Fort blends architectural and artistic traditions from Turkey and the Indian subcontinent to create the model for Mughal architecture and its subsequent refinements and adaptations."
- Criterion (iv): "Rohtas Fort is an exceptional example of the Muslim military architecture of central and south Asia during the 16th century."

The fort is noted for its high integrity and authenticity. The central archway of Chandwali gate was recently restored and is the only modern construction on the fort. However, in early 2005, the left inner face of Talaqi gate collapsed due to seepage, heavy rains, and general neglect. At the same time, the right flank and foundation detached from the original structure. Over time, Gatali gate's right bastion and supporting wall collapsed due to permeated rainwater and erosion of its foundations.

The Himalayan Wildlife Foundation conceived the Rohtas Fort Conservation Programme in 2000 to help protect the fort and develop it as a heritage site. The foundation is undertaking several projects in conjunction with the Royal Norwegian Embassy, including completing the restoration of Shah Chandwali gate and conserving Haveli Man Singh, Talaqi gate, and Gatali gate. The project also included creating the Sher Shah Suri Museum in the upper story of Sohail gate.

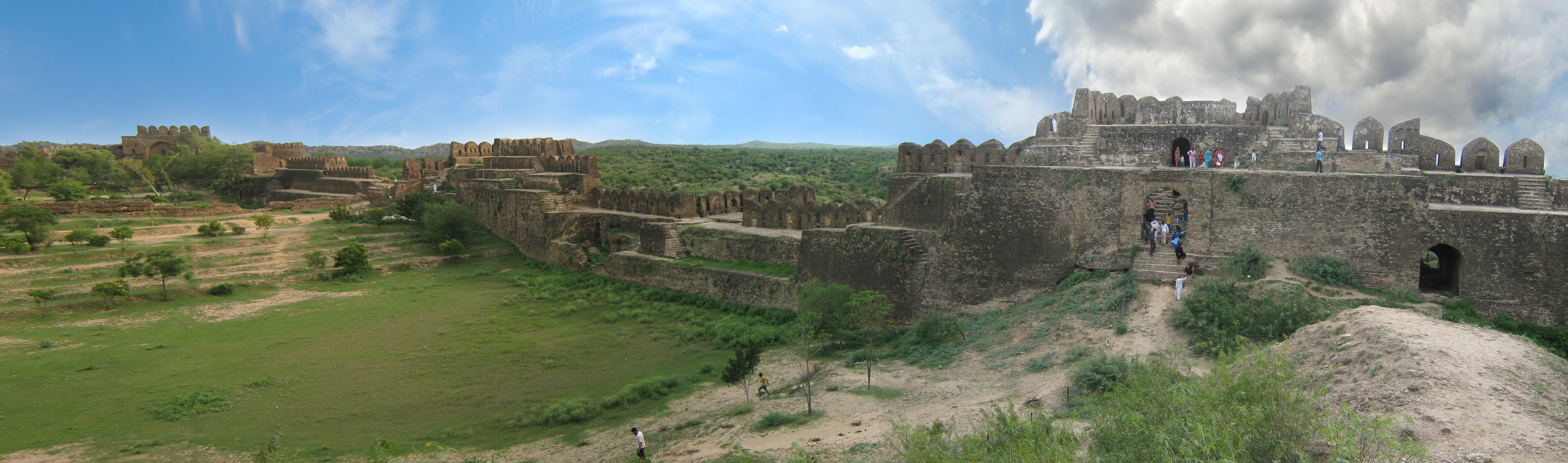
Panoramic view of the Rohtas Fort

== Rohtas City ==
The insides of the ramparts of Rohtas fort have been continuously inhabited since the times of Islam Shah Suri. The British spy Shahamat Ali estimated the population of Rohtas village in 1840s to be 1200 (chiefly Muslims), living in 350 houses. According to a 2016 estimate the permanent population of the fortress was about 4000, living in 450 houses. Today a government high school (est. 1853), a government primary school, a post office, a bazar, 17 mosques and 3 imambargahs exist in the town, as well as access to electricity and water supply. The officials regard the settlement as illegal. In 1992, the government of Pakistan ordered the locals of Rohtas village to leave the inside area of the fort, stating that the government would construct houses for them outside the fort. The order is still in effect, but no subsequent government has pursued its execution and has allowed residents to reside inside the fort. Around 40% of the population is Shia, the rest being Sunni.

International Author Ghulam Abbas Saghar also born in Rohtas Fort

== See. also ==
- List of UNESCO World Heritage Sites in Pakistan
- List of forts in Pakistan
- List of museums in Pakistan

== Bibliography ==
- Hayaud Din, Main. "Rohtas Fort"
- Institute of Architects, Pakistan Rawalpindi-Islamabad Chapter. Arch Vision, 2002.
- Matta, Basheer Ahmad Khan, Sher Shah Suri: A Fresh Perspective. Karachi: Oxford University Press, 2005. ISBN 0-19-597882-X.
- Nadiem, Ihsan H. Rohtas: Formidable Fort of Sher Shah. Lahore: Sang-e-Meel Publications, 2011. ISBN 969-35-0603-0.
