= Sonwa Mandap =

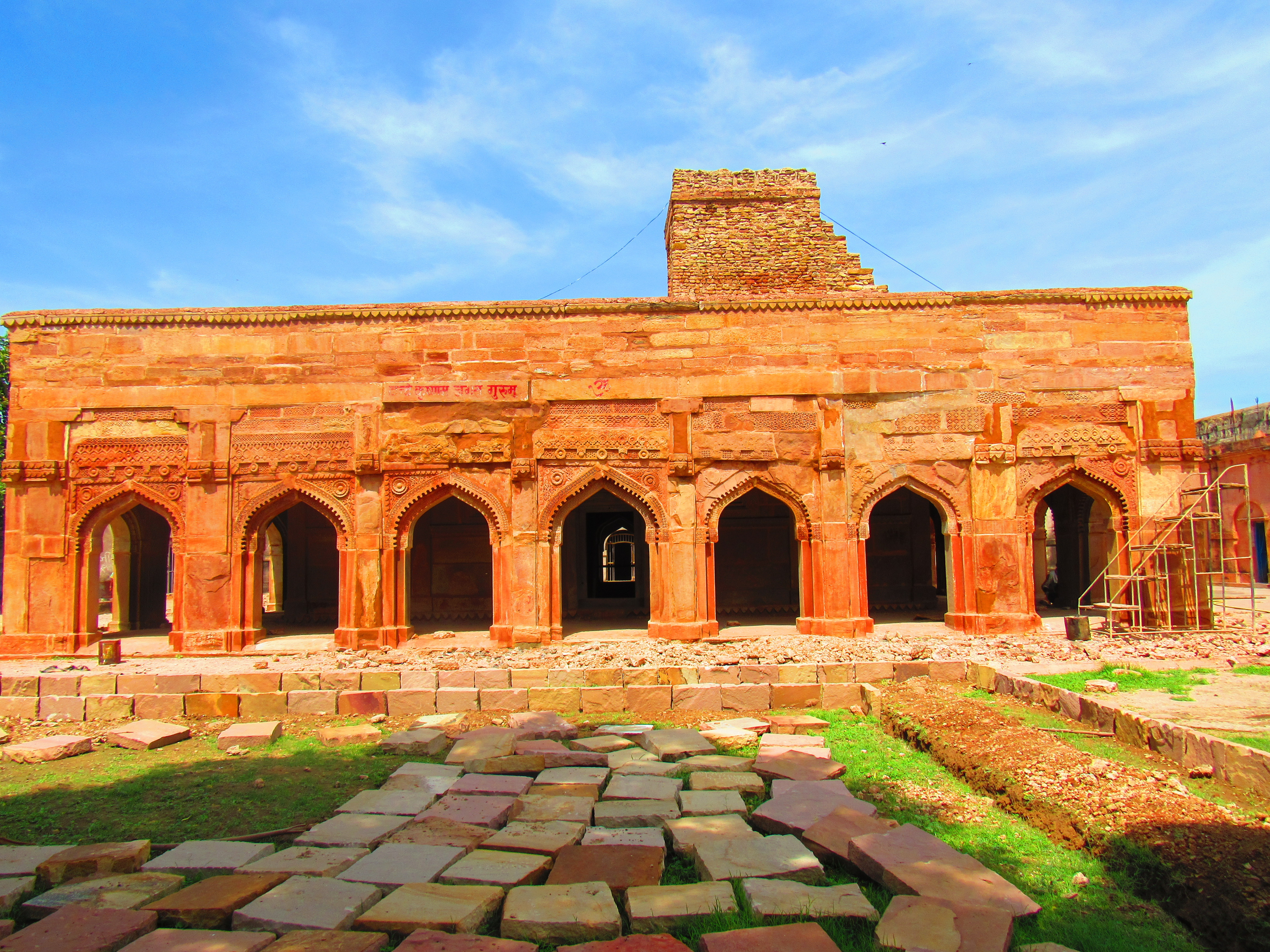
Sonwa Mandap in 2015

Sonwa Mandap is an open-air pavilion in Mirzapur district of Uttar Pradesh, India. It is one of the four notable buildings within Chunar Fort. Its 28 pillars are in the Hindu style of architecture.

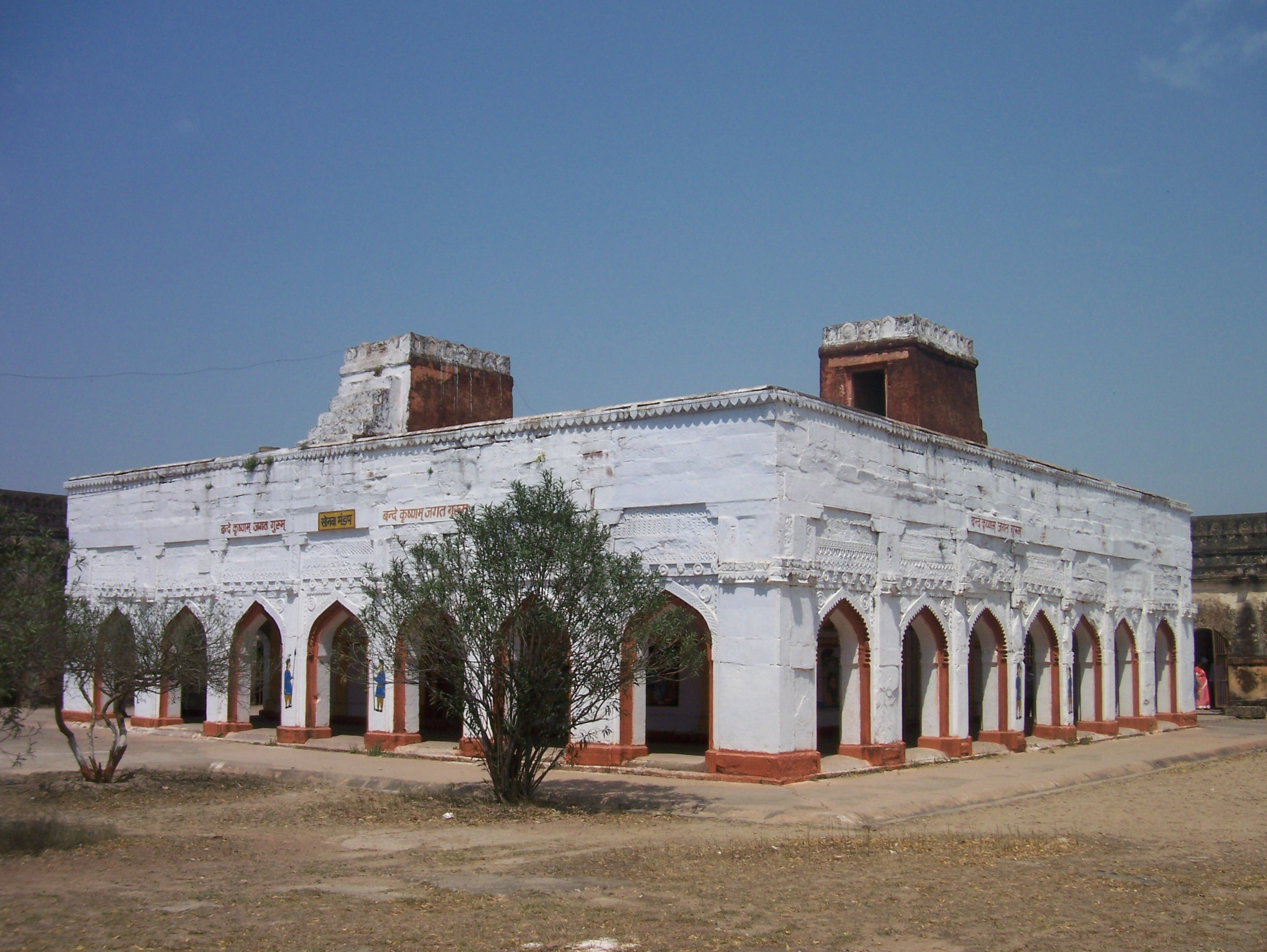
The pillars of the Sonwa Mandap in 2008

An engraving on its mehrab is believed to be filled with gold. Sonwa Mandap has four gates and a tunnel at the front yard of the building. It is mentioned that in 1333 AD, princess Sonwa, daughter of Sandeva, a Nepali king, came here frequently to take baths in the Ganga River through this tunnel. The access is from the fort. A bawdi measuring 17 feet (5.2 m) diameter and of nearly 200 feet (61 m) depth contains perennial water, its source connected to the Ganga River. It is also mentioned that princess Sonwa used this well for her ablutions. Bhartri Nath's samadhi is located at the back of this monument where religious ceremonies are conducted.
