= Outline of South Asian history =

Overviews of and topical guides to the history of South Asia

The following outline is provided as an overview of and topical guide to the history of South Asia.

The broader region in and around the historical Indian subcontinent, which includes the contemporary geopolitical entities of Afghanistan, Bangladesh, Bhutan, India, Nepal, Pakistan, and the island countries of Maldives and Sri Lanka.

== Chronology ==
Chronology of India
James Mill (1774–1836), in his The History of British India (1817), (Note: Khanna 2007, p.xvii) distinguished three phases in the history of the Indian subcontinent, namely Hindu, Muslim, and British civilisations. (Note: Khanna 2007, p.xvii) (Note: Misra 2004, p.194) This periodisation has been influential but has also been criticised for the misconceptions it has given rise to. (Note: Kulke 2004, p.7) Another influential periodisation is the division into "ancient, classical, medieval and modern periods". (Note: Flood 1996, p.21)
World History (Note: Bentley)	James Mill's Periodisation (Note: Khanna 2007, p.xvii)	ACMM (Note: Flood 1996, p.21) (Note: Stein)	Chronology of Indian History (Note: Smart 2003, p. 52–53) (Note: Michaels 2004) (Note: Muesse 2011) (Note: Flood 1996, p. 21–22)
Early Societes (3500–2500 BCE)	Early Indian Civilizations	Ancient India	Prehistoric Era; Indus Valley civilisation (c. 3300–1750 BCE)
Ancient Vedic Kingdoms (2500–600 BCE)	Hindu civilisations	Ancient India	Early Vedic period (c. 1750 – 1200 BCE)
Ancient Vedic Kingdoms (2500–600 BCE)	Hindu civilisations	Ancient India	Middle Vedic period (from 1200 BCE)
Ancient Vedic Kingdoms (2500–600 BCE)	Hindu civilisations	Ancient India	Late Vedic period (from 850 BCE)
Classical Civilisations (600 BCE–500 CE)	Hindu civilisations	Ancient India	Second urbanisation Early empires (Note: Thapar) (c. 600–200 BCE) (Note: Thapar)
Classical Civilisations (600 BCE–500 CE)	Hindu civilisations	Ancient India	Disintegration (Note: Thapar) and regional states (c. 200 BCE–300 CE) (Note: Michaels 2004, p.39)
Classical Civilisations (600 BCE–500 CE)	Hindu civilisations	Classical India	"Golden Age" (Gupta Empire) (c. 320–650 CE) (Note: Michaels 2004, p.40)
Post-classical age (500–1000 CE)	Hindu civilisations	Medieval India	Regional Indian kingdoms and Beginning of Islamic raids (c. 650–1100 CE) (Note: Michaels 2004, p.41)
Transregional nomadic empires (1000–1500 CE)	Muslim civilisations	Medieval India	Delhi Sultanate (north India) (1206–1526 CE); Vijayanagara Empire (south India) (1336–1646 CE)
Modern age (1500–present)	Muslim civilisations	Modern India	Mughal Empire (1526–1707)
Modern age (1500–present)	British civilisations	Modern India	Maratha Empire; British rule (c. 1750 CE–1947)
Modern age (1500–present)	–	Modern India	Independent India
Notes and references for table Notes Different periods are designated as "classical Hinduism": Smart calls the period between 1000 BCE and 100 CE "pre-classical". It's the formative period for the Upanishads and Brahmanism (Smart distinguishes "Brahmanism" from the Vedic religion, connecting "Brahmanism" with the Upanishads. (Note: Smart 2003, p. 52, 83–86)), Jainism and Buddhism. For Smart, the "classical period" lasts from 100 to 1000 CE, and coincides with the flowering of "classical Hinduism" and the flowering and deterioration of Mahayana-buddhism in India. (Note: Smart 2003, p.52); For Michaels, the period between 500 BCE and 200 BCE is a time of "Ascetic reformism", (Note: Michaels 2004, p.36) whereas the period between 200 BCE and 1100 CE is the time of "classical Hinduism", since there is "a turning point between the Vedic religion and Hindu religions". (Note: Michaels 2004, p.38); Muesse discerns a longer period of change, namely between 800 BCE and 200 BCE, which he calls the "Classical Period". According to Muesse, some of the fundamental concepts of Hinduism, namely karma, reincarnation and "personal enlightenment and transformation", which did not exist in the Vedic religion, developed in this time. (Note: Muesse 2003, p.14); References Sources: Bentley, Jerry H. (June 1996), "Cross-Cultural Interaction and Periodization in World History", The American Historical Review, 101 (3): 749–770, doi:10.2307/2169422, JSTOR 2169422; Flood, Gavin D. (1996), An Introduction to Hinduism, Cambridge University Press; Khanna, Meenakshi (2007), Cultural History Of Medieval India, Berghahn Books; Kulke, Hermann; Rothermund, Dietmar (2004), A History of India, Routledge; Michaels, Axel (2004), Hinduism. Past and present, Princeton, New Jersey: Princeton University Press; Misra, Amalendu (2004), Identity and Religion: Foundations of Anti-Islamism in India, SAGE; Muesse, Mark William (2003), Great World Religions: Hinduism, archived from the original on 2013-12-27; Muesse, Mark W. (2011), The Hindu Traditions: A Concise Introduction, Fortress Press; Smart, Ninian (2003), Godsdiensten van de wereld (The World's religions), Kampen: Uitgeverij Kok; Thapar, Romila (1977), A History of India. Volume One, Penguin Books

James Mill (1773–1836), in his The History of British India (1817), distinguished three phases in the history of India: Hindu, Muslim, and British civilisations. This periodisation has been influential, but has also been criticised for the misconceptions it gave rise to. Another influential periodisation is the division into "ancient, classical, medieval and modern periods", although this periodisation has also been criticised.

Romila Thapar notes that the division into Hindu-Muslim-British periods of Indian history gives too much weight to "ruling dynasties and foreign invasions", neglecting the social-economic history which often showed a strong continuity. The division into Ancient-Medieval-Modern periods overlooks the fact that the Muslim conquests occurred gradually during which time many things came and went off, while the south was never completely conquered. According to Thapar, a periodisation could also be based on "significant social and economic changes", which are not strictly related to the change of ruling powers. (Note: See also Tanvir Anjum, Temporal Divides: A Critical Review of the Major Schemes of Periodization in Indian History.)

== By period ==
=== Paleolithic and Mesolithic age ===
- Madrasian culture (1.5 MYA)
- Soanian culture (c. 500,000–125,000 BCE)
- South Asian Stone Age (c. 50,000–5000 BCE)

=== Neolithic age ===
- Bhirrana culture (7570–6200 BCE)
- Mehrgarh culture (7000–3300 BCE)

=== Bronze Age ===
Bronze Age India (3500–1500 BCE)

- Kalibangan (3500–2000 BCE)
- Indus Valley Civilization (3300–1300 BCE)
  - Early Harappan Culture (3300–2600 BCE)
  - Mature Harappan Culture (2600–1750 BCE)
  - Late Harappan Culture (1750–1300 BCE)
- Ahar Banas culture
- Copper Hoard culture
- Painted Grey Ware culture
- Black and red ware culture
- Bara culture
- Malwa culture
- Jorwe culture
- Other chalcolithic sites include Patapadu (Andhra Pradesh)

=== Iron Age and Vedic period ===
- Vedic period (c. 1500–600 BCE)
  - Puru Kingdom (c. 1500–1200 BCE)
  - Brihadratha dynasty (c. 1700–689 BCE)
  - Gandhara Kingdom (c. 1500–500 BCE)
  - Kuru dynasty (c. 1200–350 BCE)
  - Panchala dynasty (c. 1200–500 BCE)
  - Avanti Kingdom (c. 1200–300 BCE)
- Later Vedic period (c. 1000–600 BCE)
  - Matsya Kingdom (c.1000–500 BCE)
  - Chedi Kingdom (c.1000–300 BCE)
  - Surasena Kingdom (c.1000–600 BCE)
  - Kamboja Kingdom (c. 1000–550 BCE)
  - Videha Kingdom (c. 800–300 BCE)
- Pradyota dynasty (c. 682–544 BCE)
- Haryanka Kingdom (544–415 BCE)
- Pandyan Kingdom (600 BCE–1650 CE)
- Chera Kingdom (600 BCE–1102 CE)
- Chola Kingdom (600 BCE–1279 CE)
- Shishunaga dynasty (415–321 BCE)
- Nanda Empire (345–322 BCE)
- Malava Dynasty (392 BCE–78 CE)
- Macedonian Empire (330–323 BCE)
- Maurya Empire (321–185 BCE)
- Pallava Kingdom (250 BCE–800 CE)
- Maha-Megha-Vahana Empire (250 BCE–400 CE)

=== Middle kingdoms ===
- Satavahana Empire (230 BCE–220 CE)
- Kuninda Kingdom (200 BCE–300 CE)
- Indo-Scythian Kingdom (200 BCE–400 CE)
- Shunga Empire (185–73 BCE)
- Indo-Greek Kingdom (180 BCE–10 CE)
- Kanva Empire (75–26 BCE)
- Indo-Parthian Kingdom (21–130s CE)
- Western Satrap Empire (35–405 CE)
- Kushan Empire (60–240 CE)
- Bharshiva dynasty (170–350 CE)
- Nagas of Padmavati (210–340 CE)
- Sasanian Empire (224–651 CE)
- Indo-Sassanid Kingdom (230–360 CE)
- Vakataka Empire (250s–6th century CE)
- Kalabhra Empire (250–600 CE)
- Gupta Empire (280–550 CE)
- Kadamba Empire (345–525 CE)
- Western Ganga Kingdom (350–1000 CE)
- Kamarupa Kingdom (350–1100 CE)
- Vishnukundina Empire (420–624 CE)
- Maitraka Empire (475–767 CE)
- Huna Kingdom (475–576 CE)
- Rai Kingdom (489–632 CE)
- Guhila dynasty (500–1950 CE)
- Turk Shahis (500–850 CE)
- Hindu Shahis (850–1026 CE)
- Chalukya Empire (543–753 CE)
- Maukhari Empire (550s–8th century CE)
- Kalachuris of Mahishmati (6th–7th century CE)
- Harsha Empire (606–647 CE)
- Eastern Chalukya Kingdom (624–1075 CE)
- Rashidun Caliphate (632–661 CE)
- Gurjara-Pratihara Empire (650–1036 CE)
- Umayyad Caliphate (661–750 CE)
- Kalachuris of Tripuri (7th–12th century CE)
- Pala Empire (750–1174 CE)
- Rashtrakuta Empire (753–982 CE)
- Paramara Kingdom (800–1327 CE)
- Seuna dynasty (850–1334 CE)
- Chaulukya dynasty (942–1244 CE)
- Western Chalukya Empire (973–1189 CE)
- Lohara dynasty (1003–1320 CE)
- Hoysala Kingdom (1040–1346 CE)
- Sena dynasty (1070–1230 CE)
- Eastern Ganga dynasty (1078–1434 CE)
- Zamorin Kingdom (1102–1766 CE)
- Kakatiya dynasty (1083–1323 CE)
- Chutiya Kingdom (1187–1673 CE)
- Kalachuris of Kalyani (1156–1184 CE)

=== Late medieval period ===
Late medieval period (1206–1596)

- Delhi Sultanate (1206–1526 CE)
  - Mamluk Sultanate (1206–1290 CE)
  - Khalji Sultanate (1290–1320 CE)
  - Tughlaq Sultanate (1320–1414 CE)
  - Sayyid Sultanate (1414–1451 CE)
  - Lodi Sultanate (1451–1526 CE)
- Deva Kingdom (12th century–13th century CE)
- Ahom kingdom (1228–1826 CE)
- Chitradurga Kingdom (1300–1779 CE)
- Reddy Kingdom (1325–1448 CE)
- Vijayanagara Empire (1336–1646 CE)
- Bengal Sultanate (1352–1576 CE)
  - Ilyas Shahi Sultanate (1352–1487 CE)
  - Hussain Shahi Sultanate (1494–1538 CE)
  - Karrani Sultanate (1564–1576 CE)
- Garhwal Kingdom (1358–1803 CE)
- Mysore Kingdom (1399–1947 CE)
- Gajapati Empire (1434–1541 CE)
- Keladi Kingdom (1499–1763 CE)
- Deccan Sultanates (1490–1596 CE)
- Koch Kingdom (1515–1947 CE)

=== Early modern period ===
Early modern period (1526–1858)

- Bengal Sultanate (1352–1576 CE)
  - Hussain Shahi Sultanate (1494–1538 CE)
  - Karrani Sultanate (1564–1576 CE)
- Mughal Empire (1526–1858 CE)
  - Sur Empire (1540–1556 CE)
- Madurai Kingdom (1559–1736 CE)
- Thanjavur Kingdom (1572–1918 CE)
- Marava Kingdom (1600–1750 CE)
- Thondaiman Kingdom (1650–1948 CE)
- Maratha Empire (1674–1947 CE)
- Sikh Confederacy (1707–1799 CE)
- Durrani Empire (1747–1823 CE)
- Travancore Kingdom (1729–1947 CE)
- Sikh Empire (1799–1849 CE)

=== European colonial period ===
Colonial period (1510–1961 CE)

- Portuguese India (1510–1961 CE)
- Dutch India (1605–1825 CE)
- Danish India (1620–1869 CE)
- French India (1759–1954 CE)
- Company Raj (1757–1858 CE)
- British Raj (1858–1947 CE)
- Partition of British India (1947 CE)
- Portuguese Ceylon (1505–1658 CE)
- Dutch Ceylon (1656–1796 CE)
- British Ceylon (1815–1948 CE)

=== Kingdoms of Sri Lanka ===
- Kingdom of Tambapanni (543–505 BCE)
- Kingdom of Upatissa Nuwara (505–377 BCE)
- Anuradhapura Kingdom (377 BCE–1017 CE)
- Kingdom of Ruhuna (200 CE)
- Kingdom of Polonnaruwa (300–1310 CE)
- Jaffna Kingdom (1215–1624 CE)
- Kingdom of Dambadeniya (1220–1272 CE)
- Kingdom of Yapahuwa (1272–1293 CE)
- Kingdom of Kurunegala (1293–1341 CE)
- Kingdom of Gampola (1341–1347 CE)
- Kingdom of Raigama (1347–1415 CE)
- Kingdom of Kotte (1412–1597 CE)
- Kingdom of Sitawaka (1521–1594 CE)
- Kingdom of Kandy (1469–1815 CE)

== History of South Asia, by region ==
=== By South Asian subregion ===
- Central South Asia#History
- Eastern South Asia#History
  - East India#History
  - Northeast India#History
- Northern South Asia#History
  - North India#History
  - Northwest India#History
- Southern South Asia#History
  - History of South India
  - History of Sri Lanka
- Western India#History (Central western region of South Asia)

=== By country and national subdivision ===
- History of Afghanistan
- History of Bengal
- History of Bangladesh (See History of Bangladesh after independence for post-1971 history)
  - History of Chittagong
  - History of Dhaka
  - History of Rangpur
  - History of Sylhet
- History of Bhutan
- History of India for pre-1947 history (See History of the Republic of India for post-1947 history)
  - Timeline of Indian history
  - History of Andhra Pradesh
  - History of Arunachal Pradesh
  - History of Assam
  - History of Bihar
  - History of Chhattisgarh
  - History of Goa
  - History of Gujarat
  - History of Haryana
  - History of Himachal Pradesh
  - History of Jammu and Kashmir
  - History of Jharkhand
  - History of Karnataka
  - History of Kerala
  - History of Madhya Pradesh
  - History of Maharashtra
  - History of Manipur
  - History of Meghalaya
  - History of Mizoram
  - History of Nagaland
  - History of Odisha
  - History of Punjab
  - History of Rajasthan
  - History of Sikkim
  - History of Tamil Nadu
  - History of Telangana
  - History of Tripura
  - History of Uttar Pradesh
  - History of Uttarakhand
  - History of West Bengal
- History of the Maldives
- History of Nepal
- History of Pakistan for pre-1947 history (See also History of Pakistan (1947–present))
  - Pakistan studies
  - History of Azad Kashmir
  - History of Balochistan, Pakistan
  - History of Gilgit–Baltistan
  - History of Islamabad
  - History of Khyber Pakhtunkhwa
  - History of Punjab
  - History of Sindh
  - History of the Federally Administered Tribal Areas
- History of Sri Lanka
- History of British Indian Ocean Territory

== History of South Asia, by subject ==
History of architecture in South Asia

- Archaeology in India
- South Asian domes
- Coinage of India
- Economic history of India
- History of the taka
- History of South Asian cuisine
- Timeline of cultivation and domestication in South and West Asia
- History of education in the Indian subcontinent
- Execution by elephant
- Genetics and archaeogenetics of South Asia
- Indian literature
- Indian maritime history
- Indian physical culture
- Military history of India
- List of Indian monarchs
- Indology
- Linguistic history of the Indian subcontinent
- Timeline of mathematical innovation in South and West Asia
- History of metallurgy in South Asia
- History of science and technology in South Asia

== See also ==
- History of Asia
- History of Central Asia
- History of East Asia
- History of Southeast Asia
