= History of Islamabad =

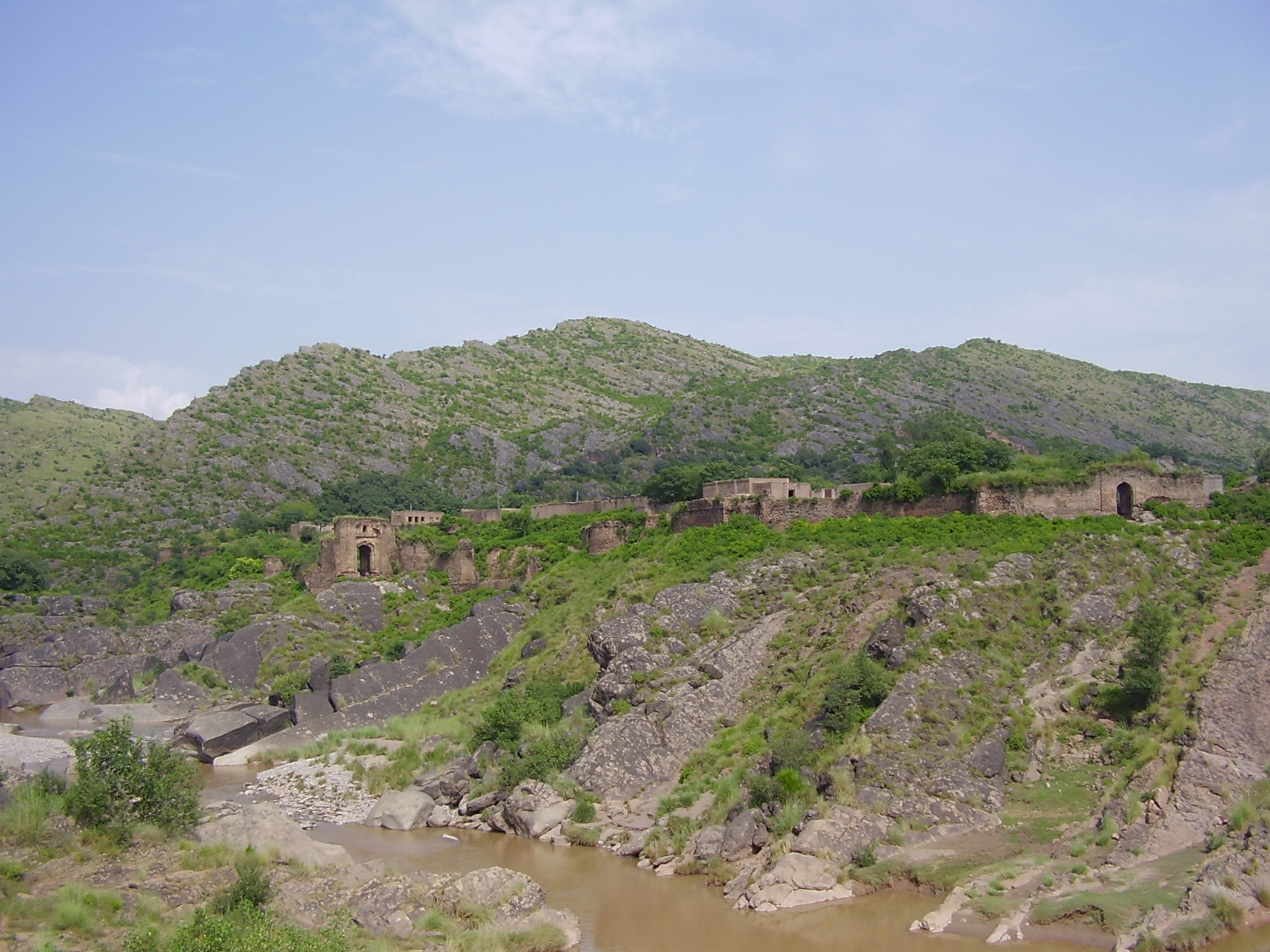
15th century Pharwala Fort besides the Soan River

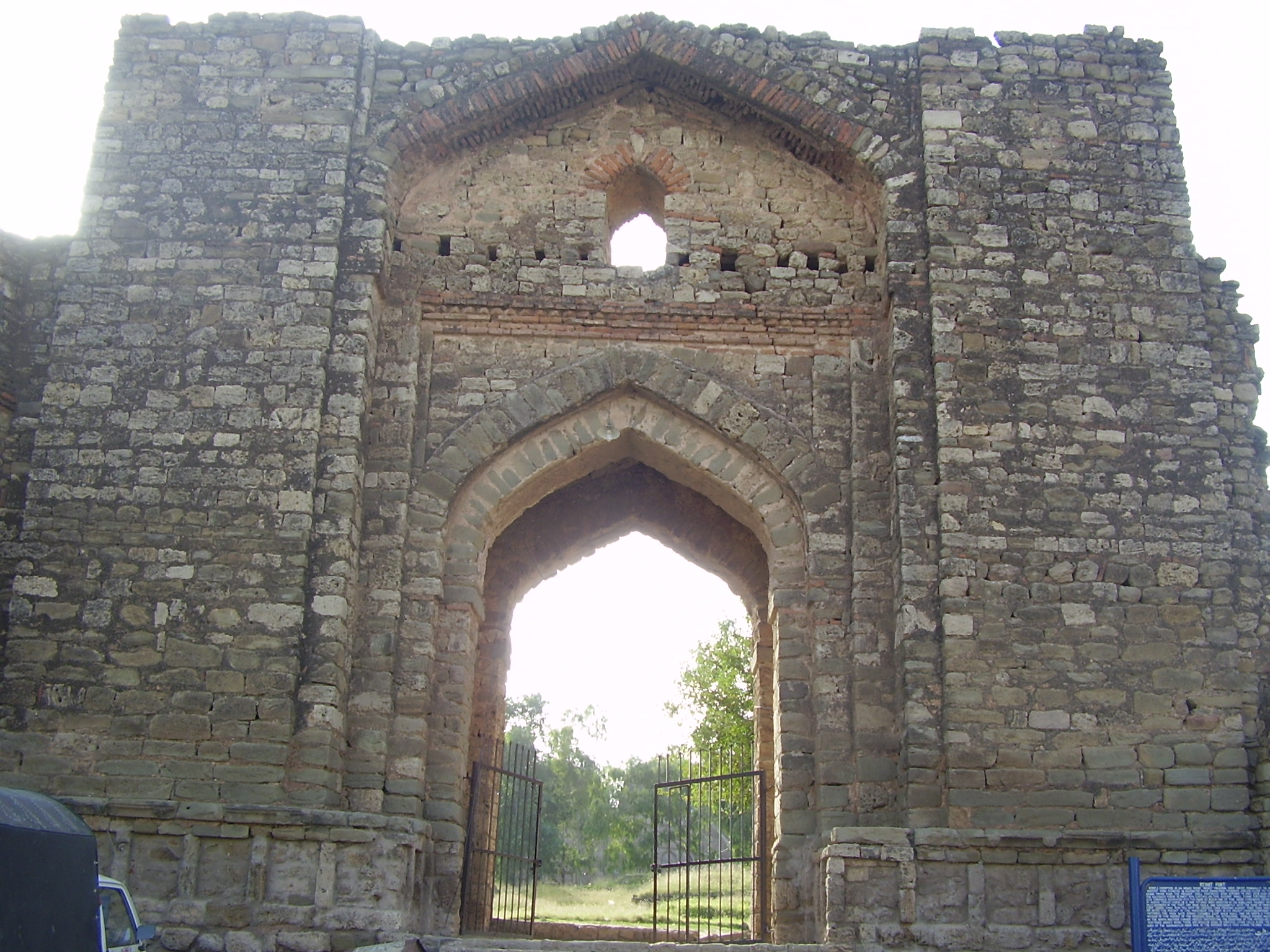
Rawat Fort, built by the Gakhars in the 16th century

The city of Islamabad, the capital of Pakistan, is located on the Pothohar Plateau within the Islamabad Capital Territory—one of the earliest known sites of human settlement in Asia. Items of pottery and utensils dating back to prehistory have been found in several areas.

Limited excavations have confirmed evidence of prehistoric cultures. Relics and human skulls have been found dating back to 5000 BC indicating this region as a home to people in Neolithic times, who roamed the banks of the Soan River. During the Neolithic, people developed small communities in the region around 3000 BC. Situated at one end of the Indus Valley civilization, the area was an early habitation of the Aryan community in Central Asia. Their civilization flourished here between the 23rd and 18th centuries BC. Many great armies such as those of Alexander the Great, Cyrus the Great, Genghis Khan, Timur and Ahmad Shah Durrani used the corridor through the region on their way to invade the Indian subcontinent.A Buddhist town once existed in this region and remains of a stupa have been identified in the G-12 sector. Modern Islamabad also incorporates the old settlement of Saidpur. The British took control of the region from the Sikhs empire in 1849 and built Asia's largest cantonment in the region in Rawalpindi. English eventually replaced Persian in education and the British actively promoted Urdu as the means of common communication.

== Construction and development ==
When Pakistan gained independence in 1947, Karachi was its first capital. In 1959, the capital of Pakistan was temporarily moved to Rawalpindi, and the Greek architect Constantinos Apostolou Doxiadis in 1960 developed a plan for the future new capital, after which the construction of a new city, called Islamabad, began. In 1960, Islamabad was constructed as a forward capital. It is considered by some as one of the most extensively and successfully planned cities in Asia.

== Cultural Heritage Sites ==
Shah Allah Ditta caves located in the foothills of the Margalla Hills near Islamabad, the Shah Allah Ditta Caves are believed to be over 2,000 years old. Initially inhabited by Buddhist monks during the Gandhara civilization, the caves were later used by Hindu ascetics and Muslim Sufi saints. In Old Persian, Gandhara was known as Gadāra (𐎥𐎭𐎠𐎼, also transliterated as Ga^{n}dāra since the nasal "n" before consonants were omitted in Old Persian). The site remains a place of historical interest and is protected under local heritage laws. Efforts have been made by the Capital Development Authority (CDA) to preserve this archaeological site, which continues to attract visitors and researchers.
