= Shahdara, Islamabad =

Shahdara
- Village
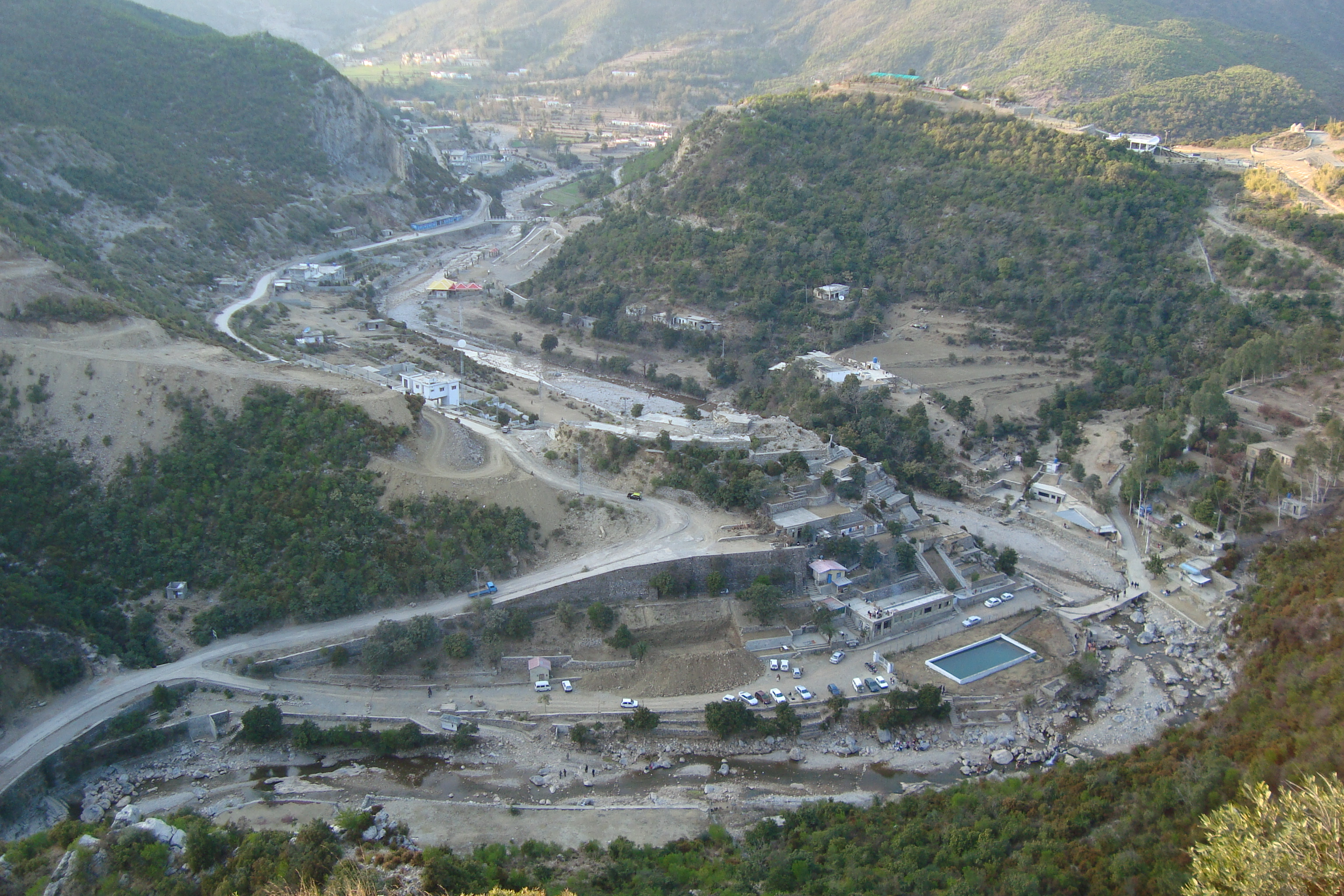
- A view of Shahdara Village
- Interactive map of Shahdara
- Country: Pakistan
- Administrative region: Islamabad
- Time zone: UTC+5 (PST)
- Calling code: 051

Shahdara (Urdu: شاہدرہ) is a village in the suburbs of Margalla Hills in Islamabad, Pakistan.

The climate of Shahdara is similar to Islamabad: winter is from November to February, spring is from March to April, summer is from May to June, rainy monsoon season is in July and August, and autumn is from September to October.
