= The History of British India =

Book by James Mill

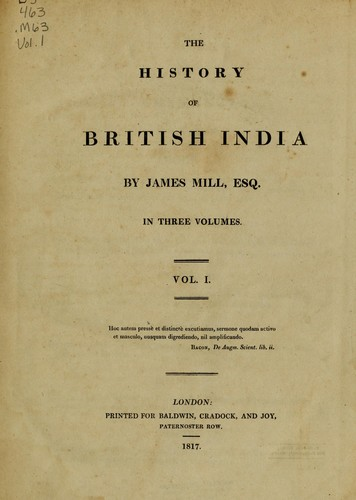
- Title page of the first edition
- Author: James Mill
- Language: English
- Genre: history, political philosophy
- Publisher: Baldwin, Cradock and Joy
- Publication date: 1817
- Publication place: United Kingdom
- Media type: Print
- OCLC: 898934488
- Website: vol. I, vol. II, vol. III

The History of British India is a three-volume work by the Scottish historian, economist, political theorist, and philosopher James Mill, charting the history of Company rule in India. The work, first published in 1817, was an instant success and secured a "modicum of prosperity" for Mill. Mill categorised Indian history into the Hindu, Muslim and British periods on the basis of dominant political powers and their religious affiliations. Mill noted that he had never been to India and was unable to speak any Indian languages, though he claimed that this improved the work's moral objective. In the work, Mill frequently denounced Hindu culture and traditions, and it has been seen by historians as an example of anti-Indian sentiments in Britain during the period.

== Genesis ==
James Mill began writing a work on the history of Company rule in India in 1808, expecting it to take him about seven years, but its completion proved to take instead twelve years, with three substantial volumes eventually being published in early 1818. The work was immediately successful and secured for Mill for the first time a "modicum of prosperity". It led, with the support of David Ricardo and Joseph Hume, to Mill's appointment in 1819 as assistant (later chief) examiner of correspondence at the British East India Company at an annual salary of £800. By 1836, when he died, this income had risen to about £2,000.

Mill's biographer Bruce Mazlish took a practical view of Mill's purpose in beginning to write the work, noting that

By 1802, unable to find a parish and disillusioned with a religious career, he "emigrated" to England. There he quickly obtained a position as editor and writer, married, and began to raise a family. To secure his position, he began to write a great work, The History of British India, in 1806, the same year as his first-born, John Stuart, arrived on the scene... James finally finished The History of British India, and on the basis of it secured the post of an examiner at the East India Company, rising to the top in a few years.

== Summary ==
The History of British India is a monumental work in which James Mill set out to display the history, character, religion, literature, arts, and laws of India, also explaining the influence of the Indian climate. He also aimed to locate the accumulated information on India within a wider theoretical framework.

The work begins with a preface in which Mill notes that he had never visited India and knew none of its native languages. To him, these are guarantees of his objectivity, and he claimed that –

A duly qualified man can obtain more knowledge of India in one year in his closet in England than he could obtain during the course of the longest life, by the use of his eyes and ears in India.

However, Mill goes on in this preface to say that his work is a "critical, or judging history", encompassing singularly harsh judgements of Hindu customs and denouncements of a "backward" culture notable for superstition, ignorance, and the mistreatment of women. His work was influential in the eventual banning by the British of the Hindu tradition of a widow being forced to immolate herself after her husband's death, known as Sati, in 1829.

From the historical perspective, Mill tells the story of the English and, later, British acquisition of wide territories in India, criticising those involved in these acquisitions and in the later administration of the conquered territories, as well as illuminating the harmful effects of commercial monopolies such as those held by the East India Company. As a philosopher, Mill applied political theory to the description of the civilisations of India. His interest is in institutions, ideas, and historical processes, while his work is relatively lacking in human interest, in that he does not seek to paint memorable portraits of Robert Clive, Warren Hastings, and the other leading players in the history of British India, nor of its famous battles. Indeed, the History has been called "a work of Benthamite 'philosophical history' from which the reader is supposed to draw lessons about human nature, reason and religion."

Despite the fact that Mill had never been to India, his work had a profound effect on the British system of governing the country, as did his later official connection with India.

The Orientalist Horace Hayman Wilson edited later editions and extended the history to 1835 with a continuation entitled The History of British India from 1805 to 1835. He also added notes to Mill's work, based on his own knowledge of India and its languages. The History of British India is still in print.

In his introduction to Ungoverned Imaginings: James Mill's The History of British India and Orientalism (1993), historian Javed Majeed argued against "colonialist discourse" approaches to the work, while in James Mill and the Despotism of Philosophy (2009), David McInerney considered how Mill's History of British India relates to Enlightenment historiography and in particular William Robertson's Historical Disquisition Concerning the Knowledge the Ancients had of India. He argues that Mill first published his theory of government in The History of British India, and that in the work Mill's use of history is not rationalist but entails an empirical conception of how historical records relate to the improvement of governance.

== Views of Indians ==
According to historian Thomas Trautmann, "James Mill's highly influential History of British India (1817) – most particularly the long essay 'Of the Hindus' comprising ten chapters – is the single most important source of British Indophobia and hostility to Orientalism." In the chapter titled "General Reflections in 'Of the Hindus'", Mill wrote "under the glosing [sic] exterior of the Hindu, lies a general disposition to deceit and perfidy."

Mill's History of British India begins with a remarkable preface. He says that his never having been to India and knowing none of the native languages are an advantage, and a guarantee of his objectivity. But, far from being objective, his is, as he says, a 'critical, or judging history' whose judgements on Hindu customs and practices are particularly harsh. He denounces their 'rude' and 'backward' culture for its ignorance, superstition, and mistreatment of women, and leaves no doubt that he favours a thoroughgoing reform of Indian institutions and practices.

Mill presented Indians as uncivilised, ignorant, and lacking rational and scientific thinking. According to historian Romila Thapar, Mill's categorisation of Indian history into Hindu, Muslim, and British periods led to significant distortions and corruptions.

Kundan Singh, Professor and doctoral supervisor at the Sofia University and the Hindu University of America and Krishna Maheshwari have recently put light on the colonial writings of Mill. Singh and Maheshwari say the following:

One of his chief refrains in showing the Hindu people as primitive and savage was that they are hierarchical and oppressive: their social structure is hierarchical and oppressive; their governance structure since antiquity has been hierarchical and oppressive; their taxation structure is hierarchical and oppressive; their laws, culture,and mores are hierarchical and oppressive; the Hindu males are oppressive towards Hindu women; the Hindu teachers are oppressive towards their students, etc. He concluded the discussion by describing the Hindus as inhuman, villainous, timid, weak, cowardly, lazy, pernicious, greedy, filthy, superstitious, and fatalistic. In the process, he slammed Hinduism as irrational, incoherent, immoral, childlike, and pagan.

== Editions ==
- 1817. The History of British India (1st ed.), 3 vols. London: Baldwin, Cradock and Joy. volume I, volume II, volume III. OCLC 898934488.
- 1820. The History of British India (2nd ed.), 6 vols. London: Baldwin, Cradock and Joy. OCLC 505123143.
- 1826. The History of British India (3rd ed.), 6 vols. London: Baldwin, Cradock and Joy. OCLC 5224340.
- 1848. The History of British India (4th ed.), 10 vols., edited by H. H. Wilson. London: James Madden. OCLC 65314750.
- 1858. The History of British India (5th ed.), 10 vols., edited by H. H. Wilson. London: James Madden. OCLC 893322163.
- 1972. The History of British India (reprint), 3 vols. New Delhi: Associated Publishing House. ISBN 978-1-122-81783-7. OCLC 917576212.
- 1997. James Mill's History of British India, 10 vols. (including Horace Hayman Wilson's continuation to 1835). London: Routledge. ISBN 978-0-415-15382-9. OCLC 313028143.

=== Fifth edition ===
The fifth edition (1858), in ten volumes, is edited by Horace Hayman Wilson. The first six volumes are based on an earlier six volume edition, while volumes seven to nine are based on an earlier three volume edition. The tenth volume is an index volume, split into two indexes, the first index for volumes one to six, the second index for volumes seven to nine.

- The History of British India. Vol. 1. J. Madden. 1858. 1527-1707, Commencement, The Hindus ....
- The History of British India. Vol. 2. J. Madden. 1858. .... Hindus, Mohammedans
- The History of British India. Vol. 3. J. Madden. 1858. 1708-1773, The East India Company
- The History of British India. Vol. 4. J. Madden. 1858. 1773-1784, Pitt's Act
- The History of British India. Vol. 5. J. Madden. 1858. 1784-1805, The Mahrattas ....
- The History of British India. Vol. 6. J. Madden. 1858. 1784-1805, .... The Mahrattas
- The History of British India. Vol. 7. J. Madden. 1858. 1805-1813, Peace with the Mahrattas
- The History of British India. Vol. 8. J. Madden. 1858. 1813-1823, Administration of Marquis of Hastings
- The History of British India. Vol. 9. J. Madden. 1858. 1823-1835, Administration of Lord Bentinck
- The History of British India. Vol. 10. J. Madden. 1858. an index to the James Mills volumes (1-6), and an index to the Horace Wilson volumes (7-9)

== Secondary literature ==
- Majeed, Javed, Ungoverned Imaginings: James Mill's the History of British India and Orientalism (Oxford: University of California Press, 1992, 225 pp.) ISBN 978-0-19-811786-5
- Yasukawa, Ryuji, 'James Mill's The History of British India Reconsidered', in Journal of the Tokyo College of Economics vol. 203 (1997) pp. 65–88
- McInerney, David, James Mill and the Despotism of Philosophy: Reading 'The History of British India' (London: Routledge, 2009, ISBN 978-0-415-95612-3)
- Harrington, Jack, Sir John Malcolm and the Creation of British India (New York: Palgrave Macmillan, 2010), chs. 2 & 6.
