= Margalla Hills =

Himalayan foothills in Islamabad Capital Territory, Pakistan

Margalla hills
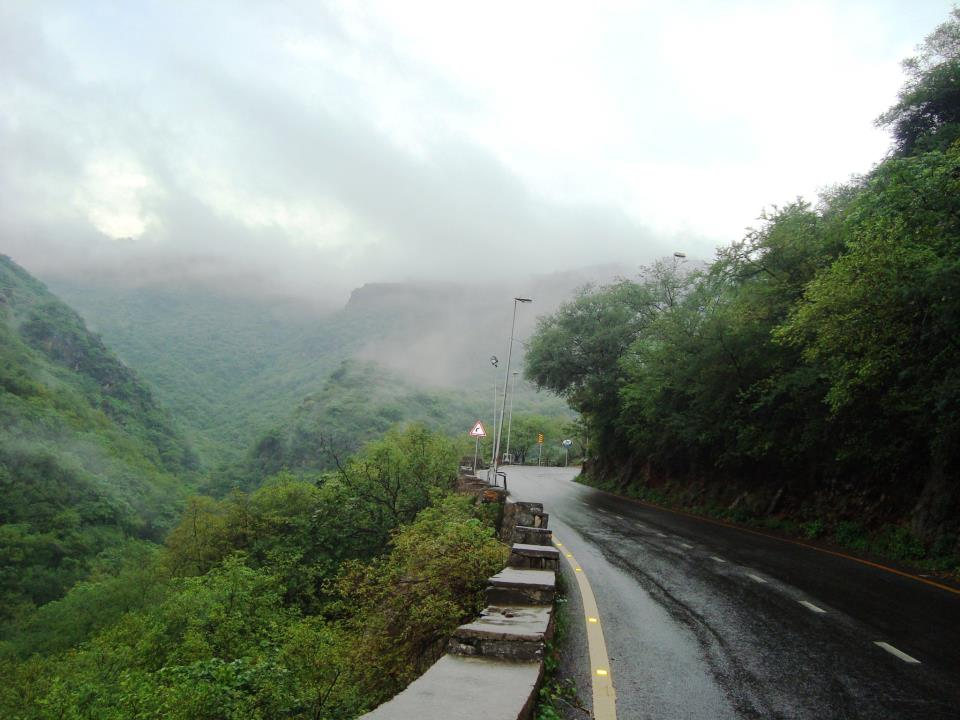

- The Margalla hills are above the city of Islamabad

Ecology
- Realm: Indomalayan
- Biome: Tropical and subtropical moist broadleaf forest
- Borders: Himalayan subtropical pine forests; Western Himalayan broadleaf forests; Baluchistan xeric woodlands
- Bird species: 431
- Mammal species: 38

Geography
- Country: Pakistan
- State: Islamabad Capital Territory
- Elevation: 1,604 m (5,262 ft) of Tilla Charouni
- Coordinates: 33°45′39″N 73°02′07″E
- Geology: Early Eocene Limestone formations
- Climate type: Humid subtropical climate

Conservation
- Protected: 71%

The Margalla Hills (Note: Urdu: سلسلہ کوہ مارگلہ) is a hill range within the Margalla Hills National Park in the northwestern Punjab region in Pakistan, forming the northern edge of the Islamabad Capital Territory, just south of Haripur district of Khyber Pakhtunkhwa. They are part of the Himalayan foothills on the Himalayan biodiversity hotspot and form a subtropical moist broadleaf forest ecoregion. The Margalla range has an area of 12,605 hectares. The biodiversity in these hills is significantly higher than the drier areas to the south and the colder areas up north, primarily due to its high rainfall and subtropical heat.

== Climate ==
This region falls in the humid subtropical climate zone. The average annual rainfall in the Islamabad area is 1,457 millimetres (57.4 in). Much of the high rainfall is delivered here from the moisture laden air of the Bay of Bengal hitting the lower Himalayas.

== Paleontology and archeology ==
According to the research carried out by scientists and archaeologists of the project "Post-Earthquake Explorations of Human Remains in Margalla Hills", the formation of the Margalla Hills dates to the Miocene epoch. The dominant limestone of the Margalla is mixed with sandstone and occasional minor beds of shale. The archaeologists of the project have also found two human footprints over one million years old here, preserved in sands.

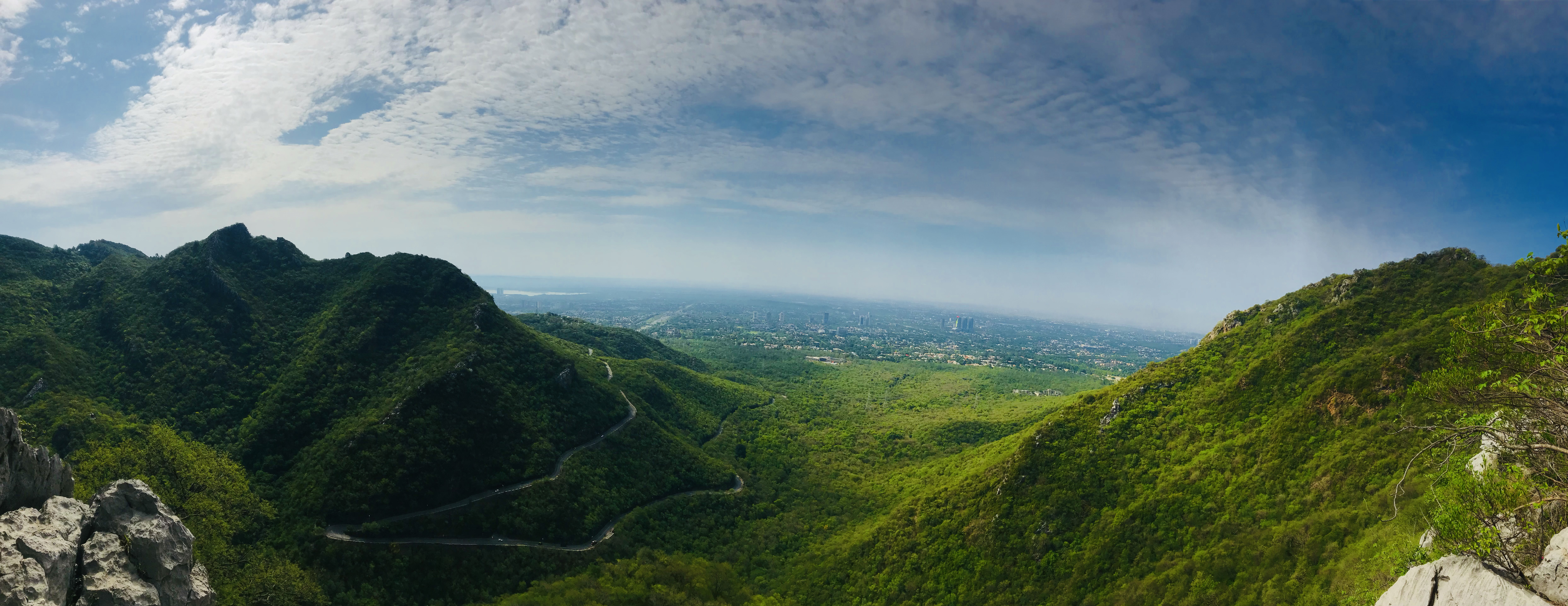
Panoramic view of Margalla hills

The Shah Allah Ditta Caves are also part of its ancient history. This cave is about 2500 years old and it is believed that Alexander The Great as well as several other emperors used this route to either pass by or pass into this area. The cave also has Buddhist-era murals dating to at least 2400 before present. The cave has seven alcoves of different sizes for lamps which are still conserved today. Furthermore, one of the paintings found within the cave is of the Hindu god Shiva.

== Flora ==
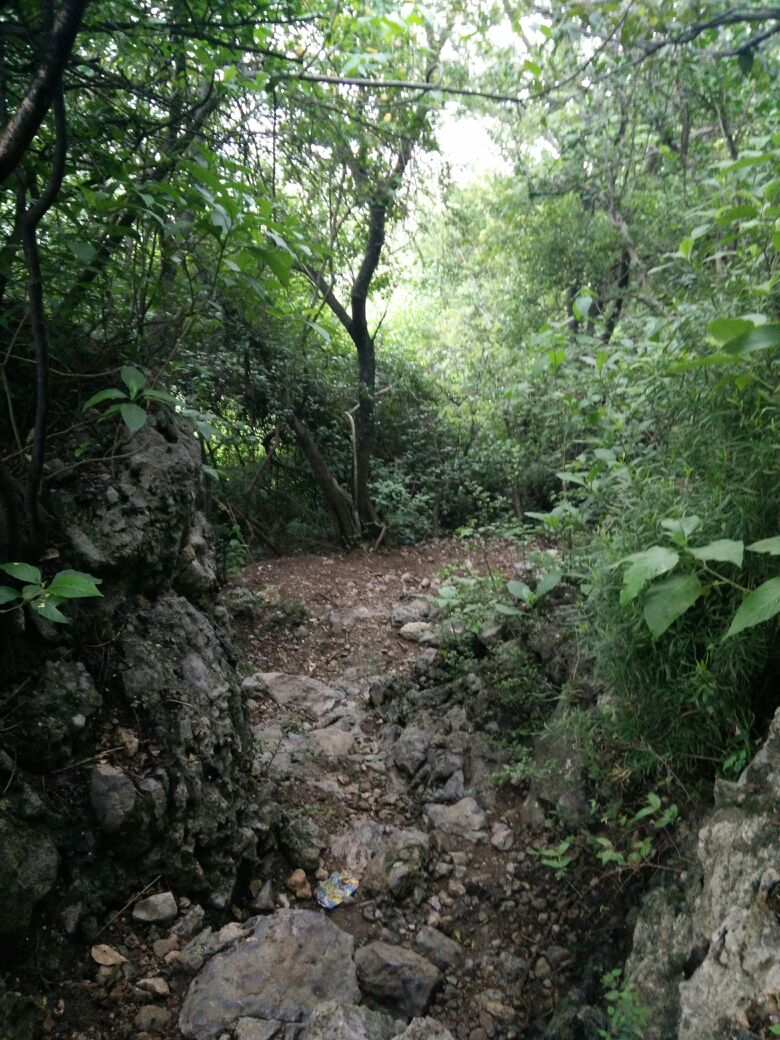
Dense vegetation of the forest

There are around 250 to 300 species of plants on the Margalla Hills. As many as two-thirds of them are used by the people for their medicinal effects to treat or cure various diseases.

There are several species of native trees in hills, some of the trees in the moist lower and middle slopes include species like the Bombax ceiba, Ficus benghalensis, Ficus racemosa, Ficus religiosa, Ficus auriculata, Bauhinia variegata, Butea monosperma, Syzygium cumini, Erythrina suberosa, Melia azedarach, Toona ciliata, Flacourtia indica, Grewia optiva, Lannea coromandelica, Mallotus philippensis, Albizia lebbeck, Phyllanthus emblica, Dalbergia sissoo, Senegalia catechu, Senegalia modesta, Vachellia nilotica and various others. The cooler upper slopes are inhabited by Pinus roxburghii, Quercus leucotrichophora, Pyrus pashia, Olea ferruginea, Aesculus indica, Dodonaea viscosa and Corylus jacquemontii, which transition into the Himalayan subtropical pine forests.

There is high diversity of the other plants as well including Adhatoda vasica, Rhododendron arboreum, Incarvillea emodi, Indigofera heterantha, Hypericum oblongifolium, Tulipa clusiana, Clematis gouriana, Helicteres isora, Woodfordia fruticosa, Viburnum cotinifolium, Chrysojasminum humile, Commelina benghalensis, Phyla nodiflora, Nelumbo nucifera, Gloriosa superba, Sauromatum venosum, Malva sylvestris, Hedera nepalensis, fern species like Adiantum incisum and Pteris vittata, as well as the bamboo species Dendrocalamus strictus.

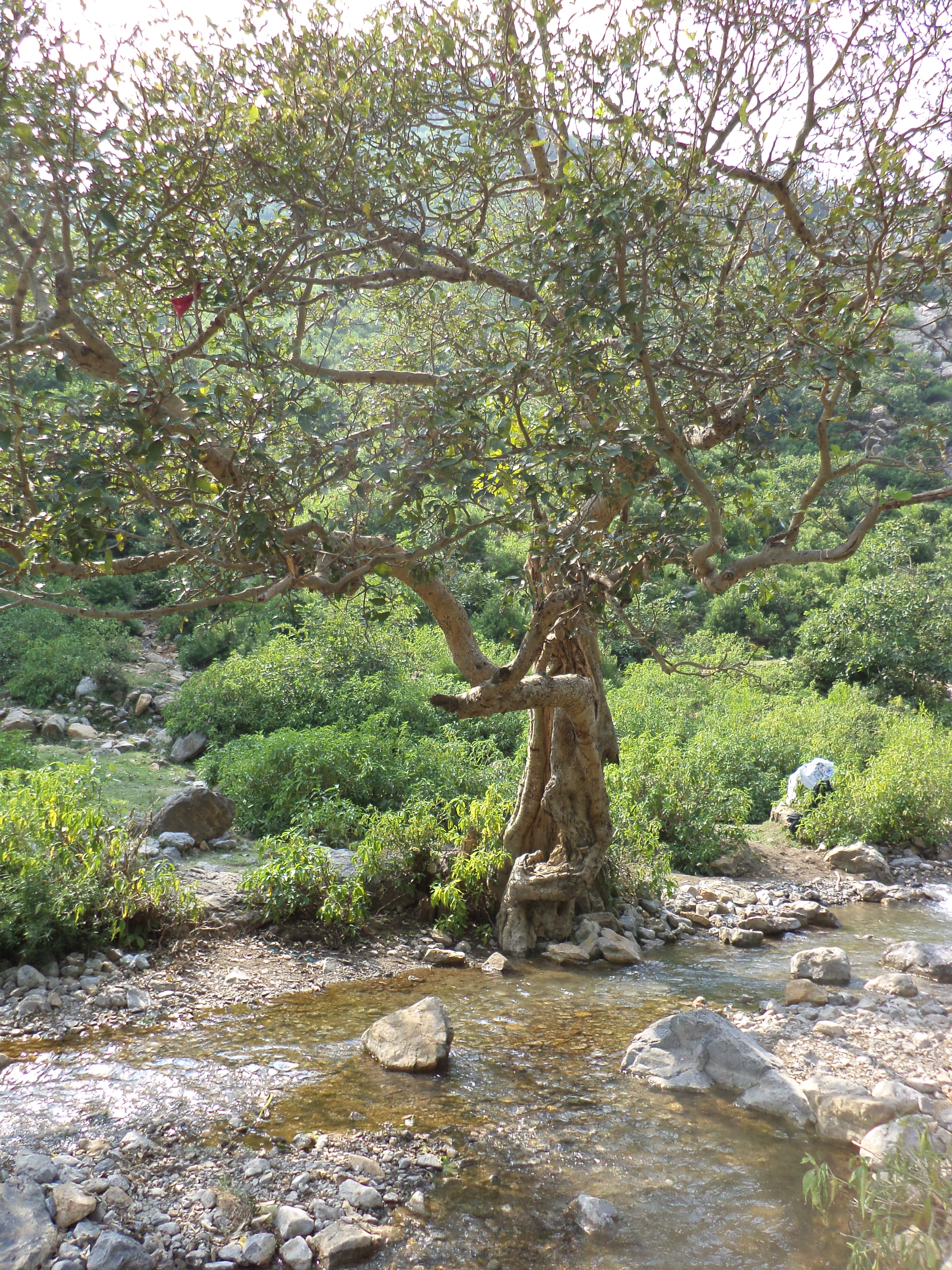
Ficus religiosa in the Margalla hills

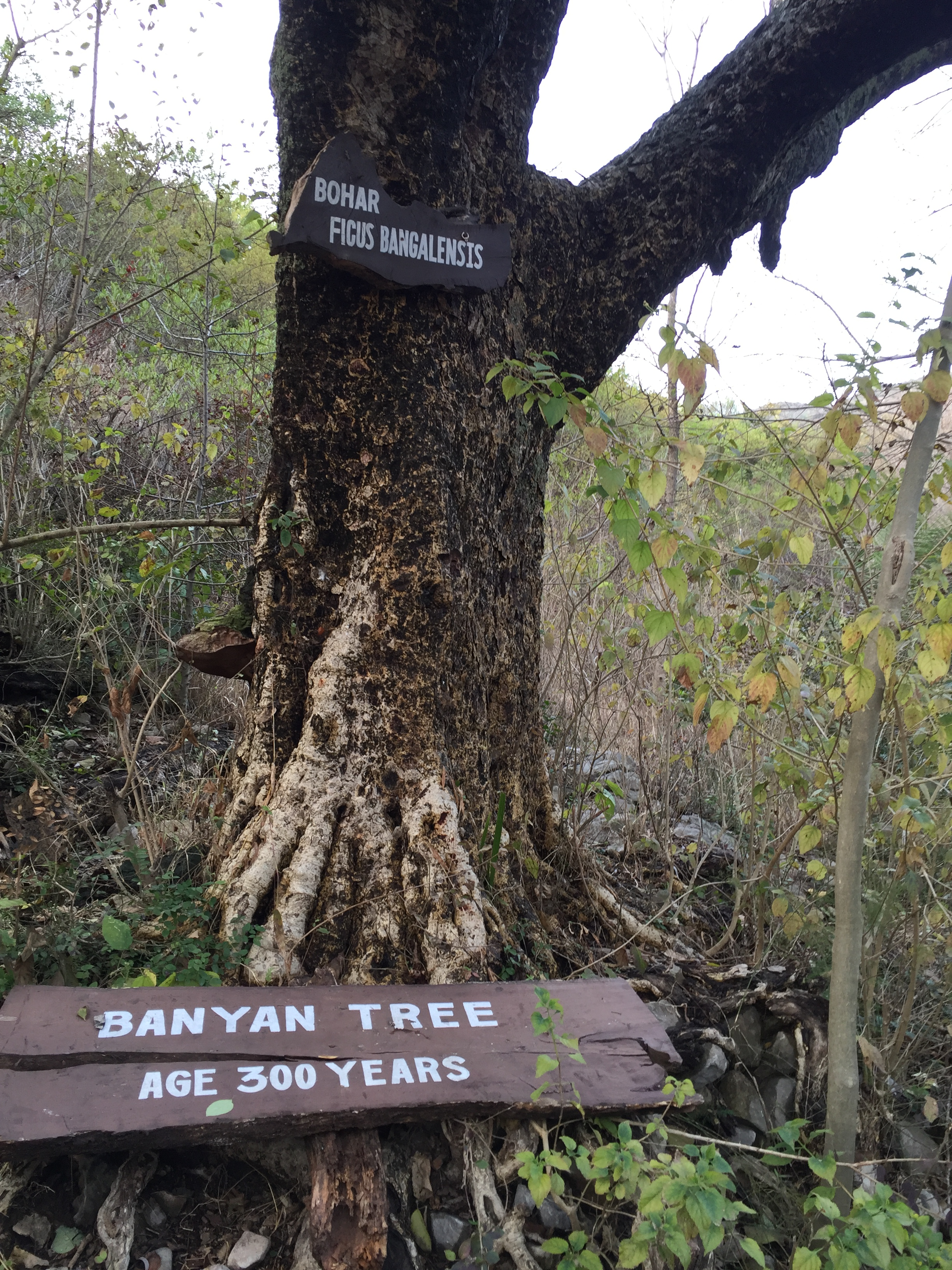
ficus benghalensis in Margalla hills.

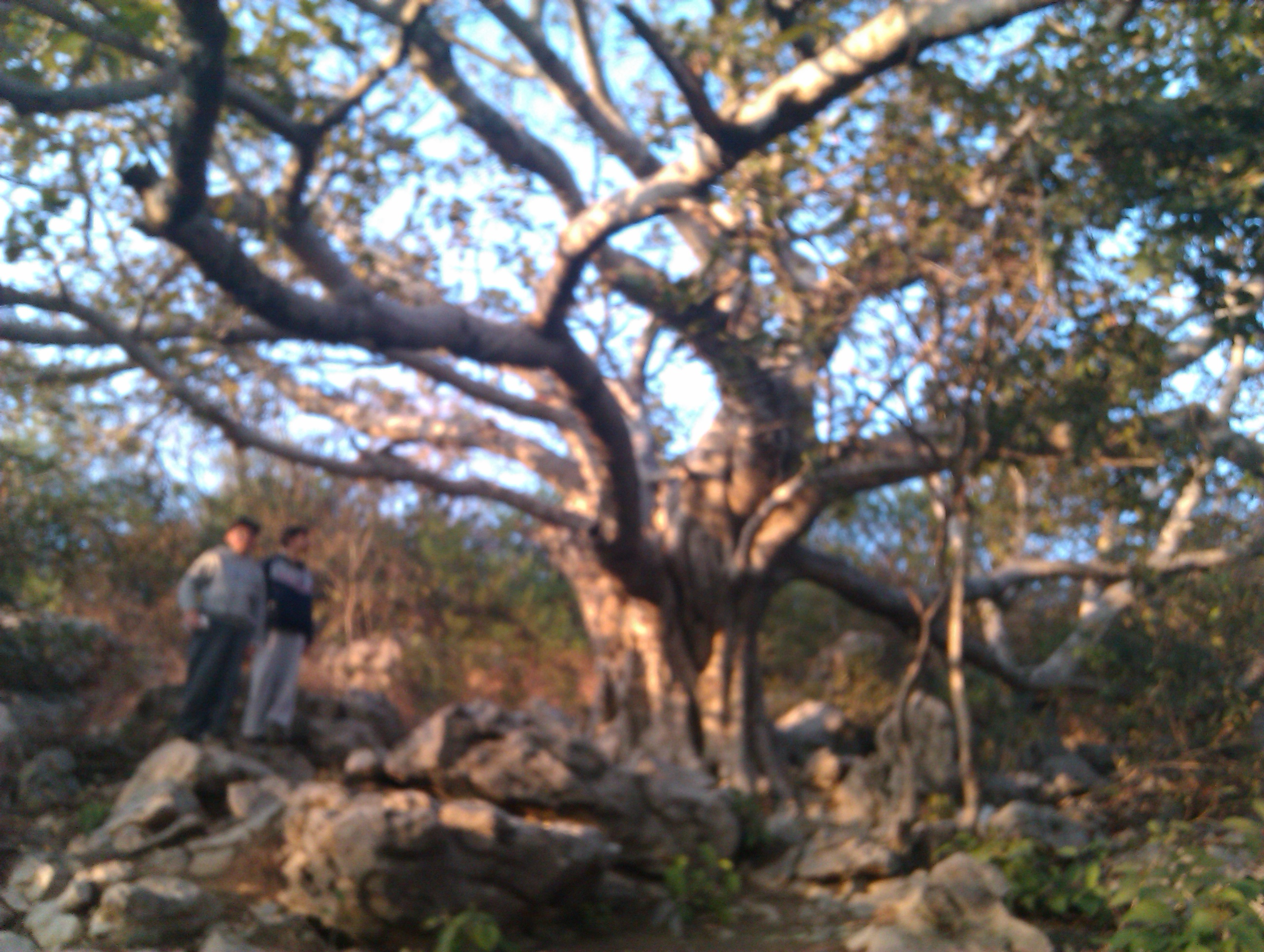
Old Banyan tree in the hills

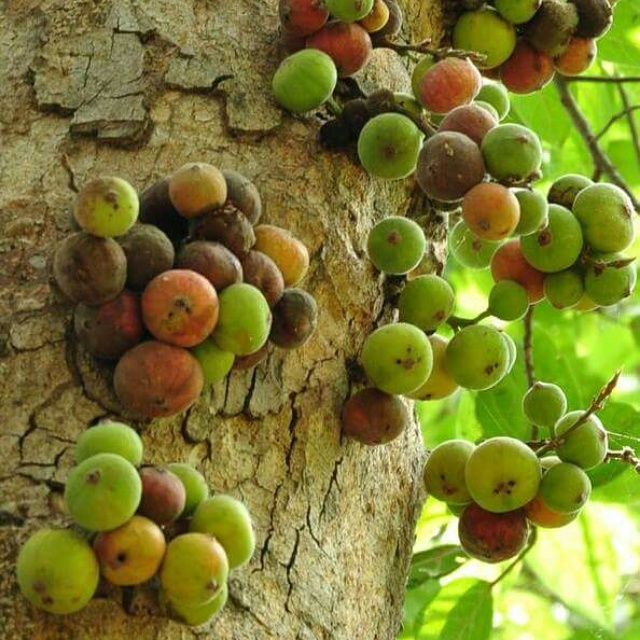
Fruiting ficus racemosa tree near the hills.

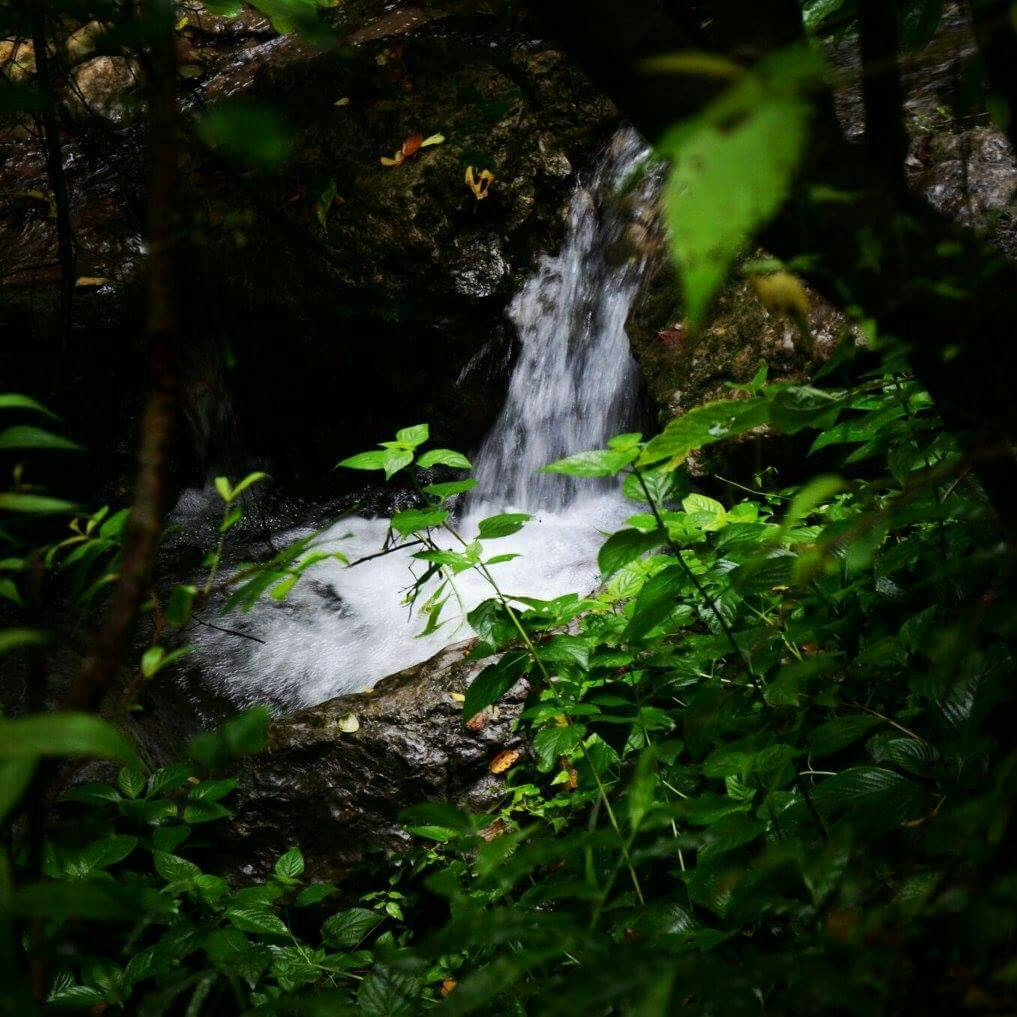
Forested stream.

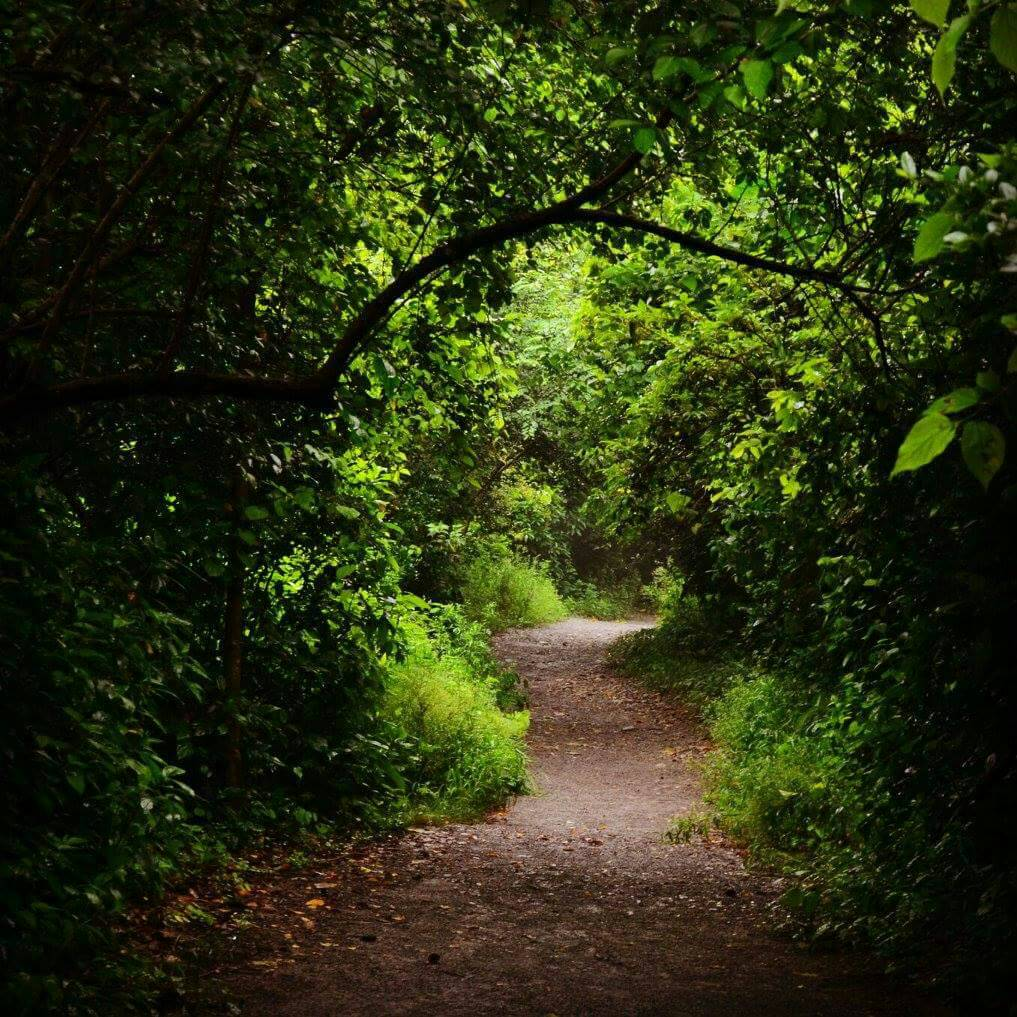
Humid lowland forests along a trail.

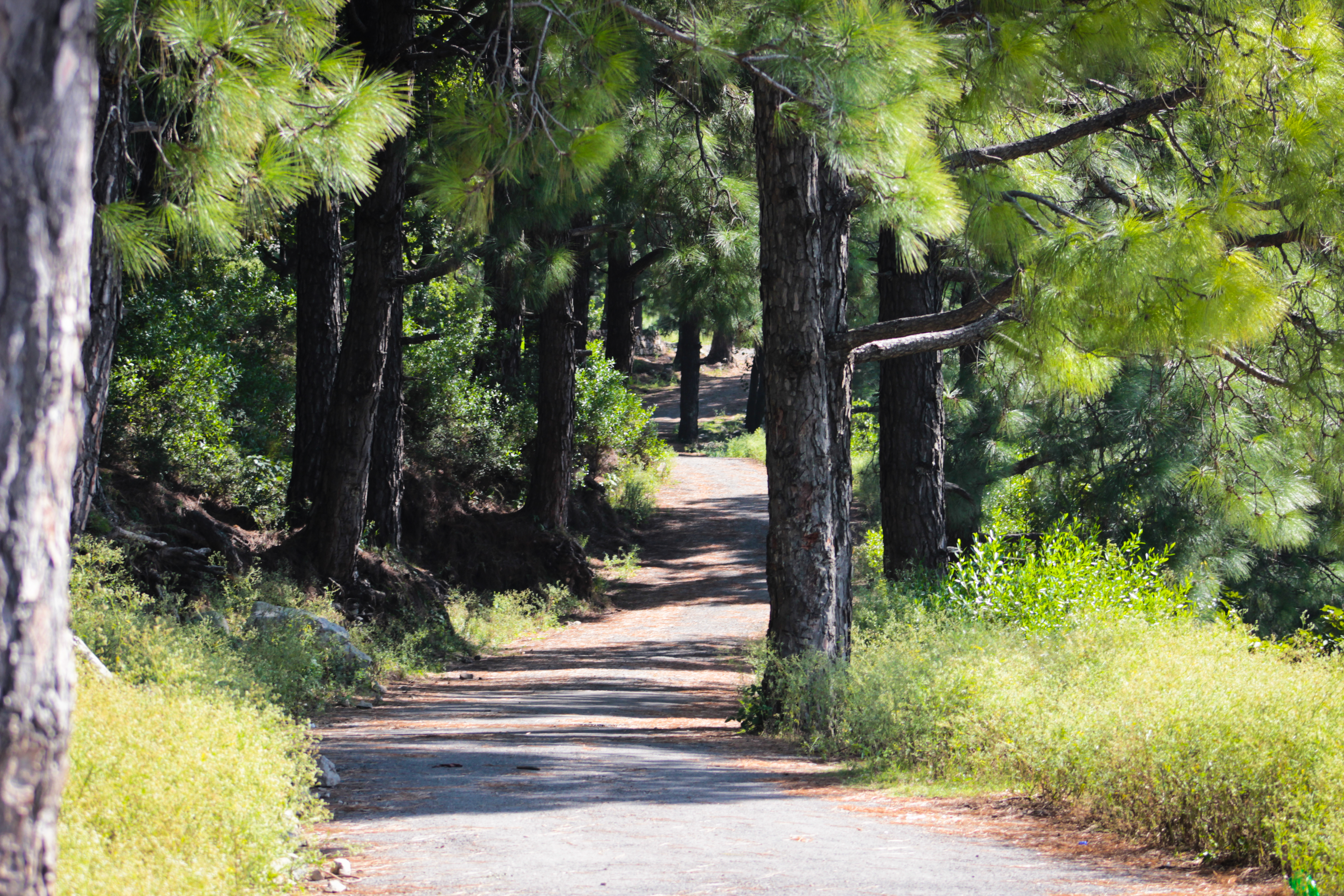
Open highland forests.

== Fauna ==
There have been 430+ bird species recorded in and around Margalla hills, some of them include the blue-throated barbet, coppersmith barbet, great barbet, plum-headed parakeet, rose-ringed parakeet, slaty-headed parakeet, Indian pitta, Indian paradise flycatcher, spotted forktail, Indian pied myna, rusty-cheeked scimitar babbler, rufous-bellied niltava, verditer flycatcher, blue-throated blue flycatcher, crimson sunbird, Mrs. Gould's sunbird, purple sunbird, kalij pheasant, Asian koel, orange-headed thrush, rufous treepie, Indian pond heron, wire-tailed swallow, Himalayan bulbul, Indian white-eye, brahminy starling, white-capped redstart, Oriental magpie-robin, red-vented bulbul and others.

There are around 30 or more mammal species here, some of the herbivores include the rhesus macaque (Macaca mulatta), Northern red muntjac (Muntiacus vaginalis), Kashmir flying squirrel (Eoglaucomys fimbriatus), Indian crested porcupine (Hystrix indica), and grey goral (Naemorhedus goral), predators include the Indian leopard (Panthera pardus fusca), Indian wolf (Canis lupus pallipes), golden jackal (Canis aureus), yellow-throated marten (Matres flavigula), masked palm civet (Paguma larvata), small Indian civet (Viverricula indica), jungle cat (Felis chaus) and leopard cat (Prionailurus bengalensis).

There are many butterfly species in and around these hills like the papilio protenor, papilio polyctor, vagrans egista, graphium sarpedon, hypolimnas bolina, pseudergolis wedah, athyma perius, symbrenthia lilaea, arhopala rama, catopsilia pomona, charaxes agrarius as well as the Tajuria cippus.

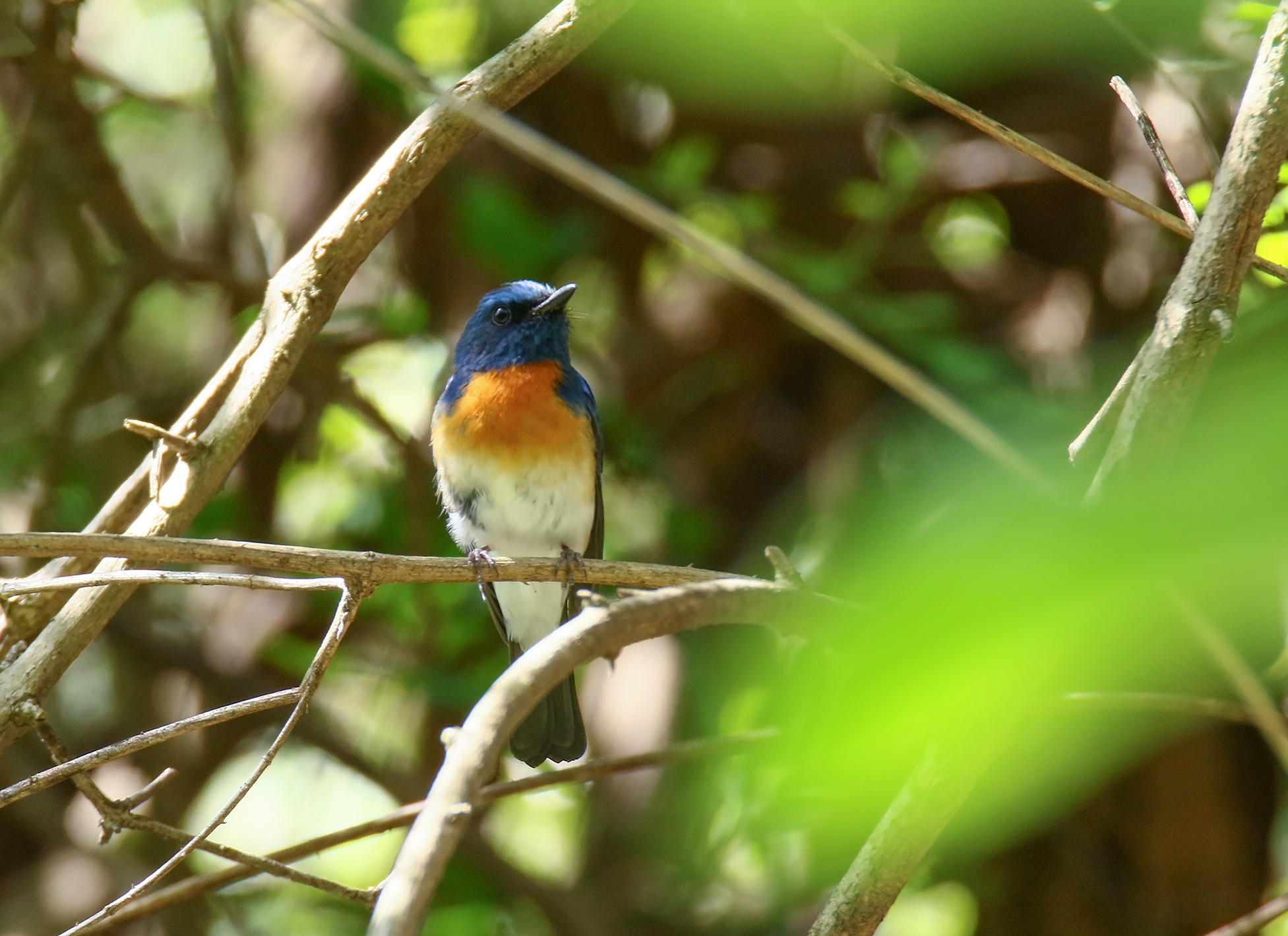
Blue-throated blue flycatcher in the Margalla hills

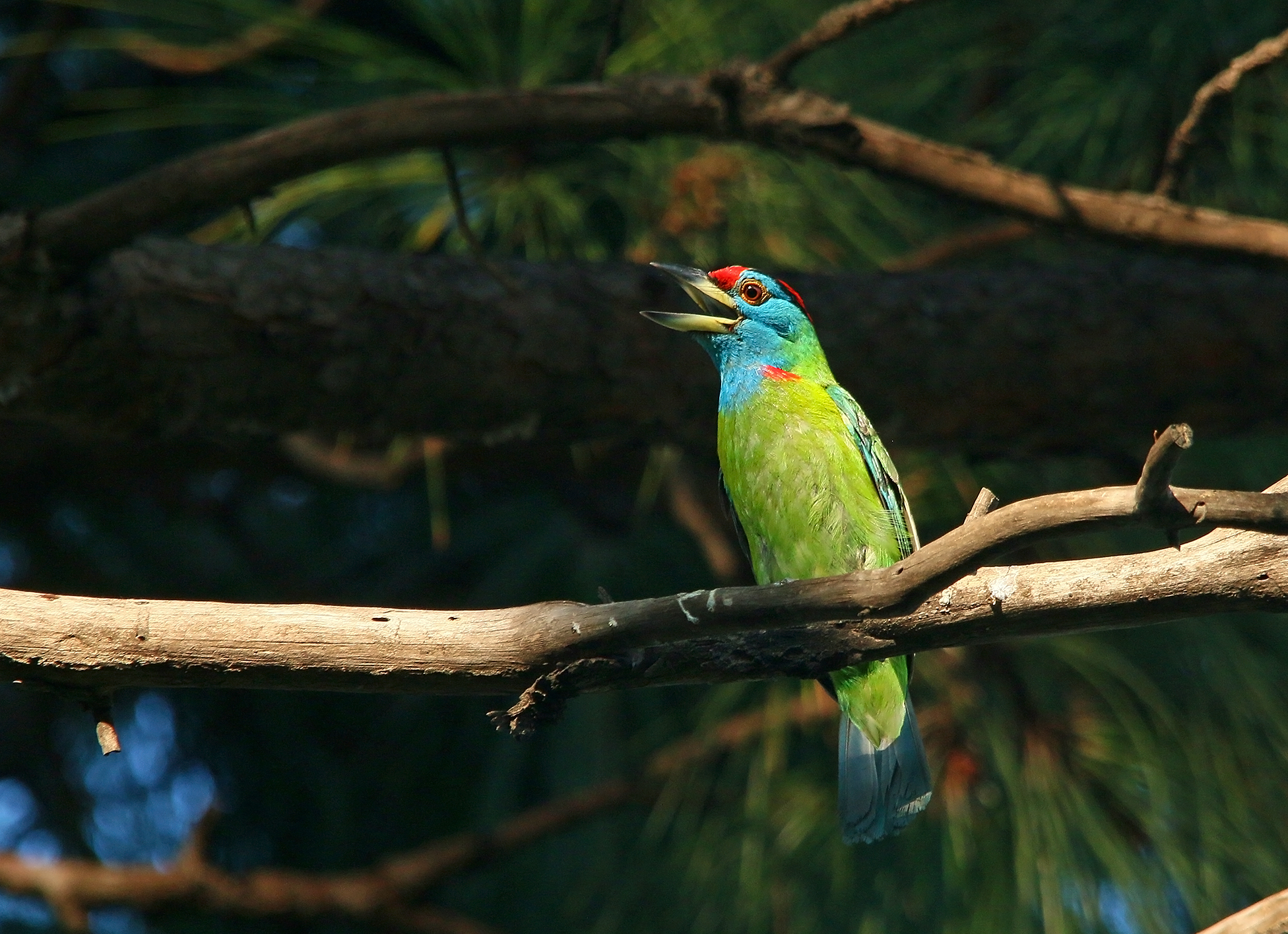
Blue-throated barbet in the hills.

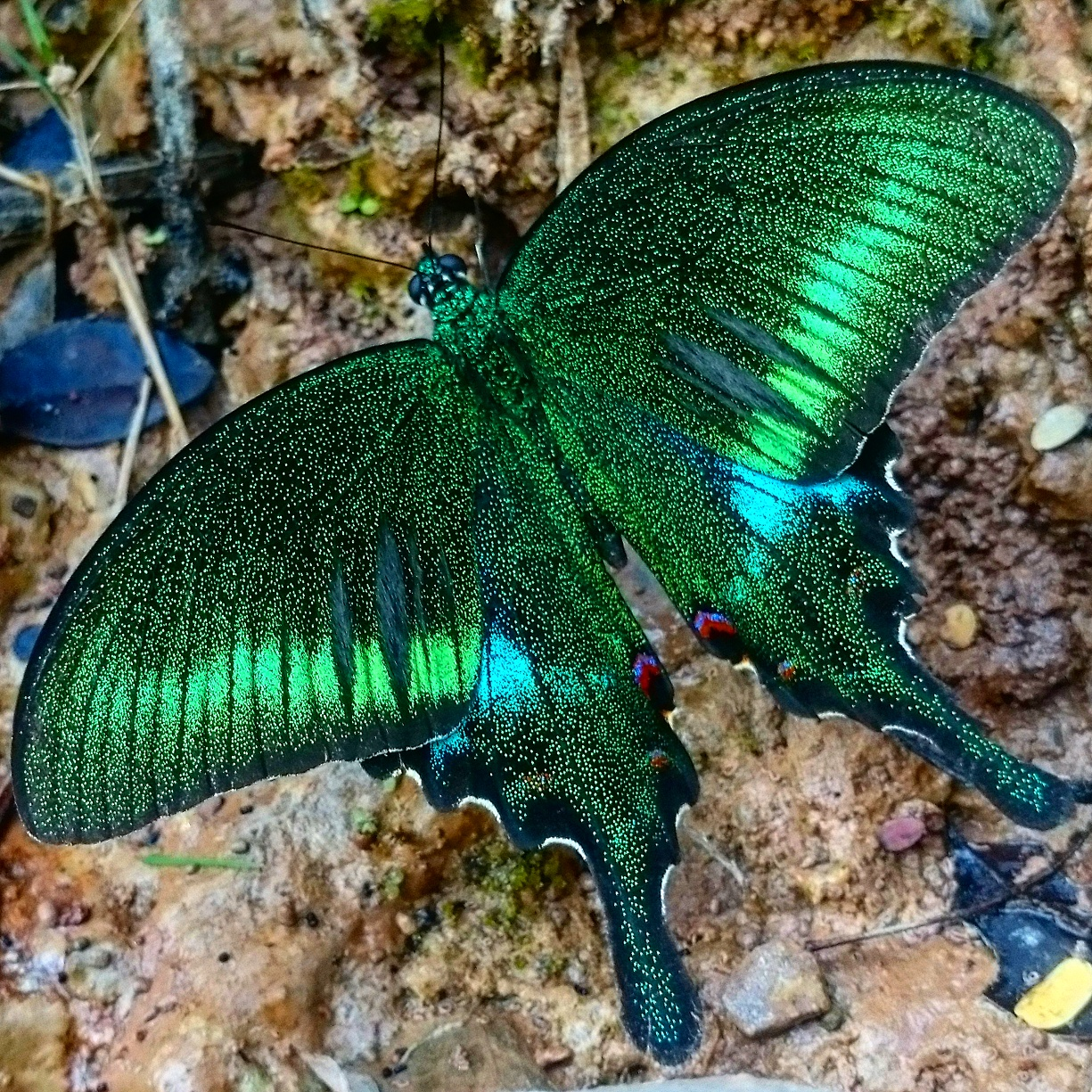
Papilio polyctor, one of the butterfly species in the hills.

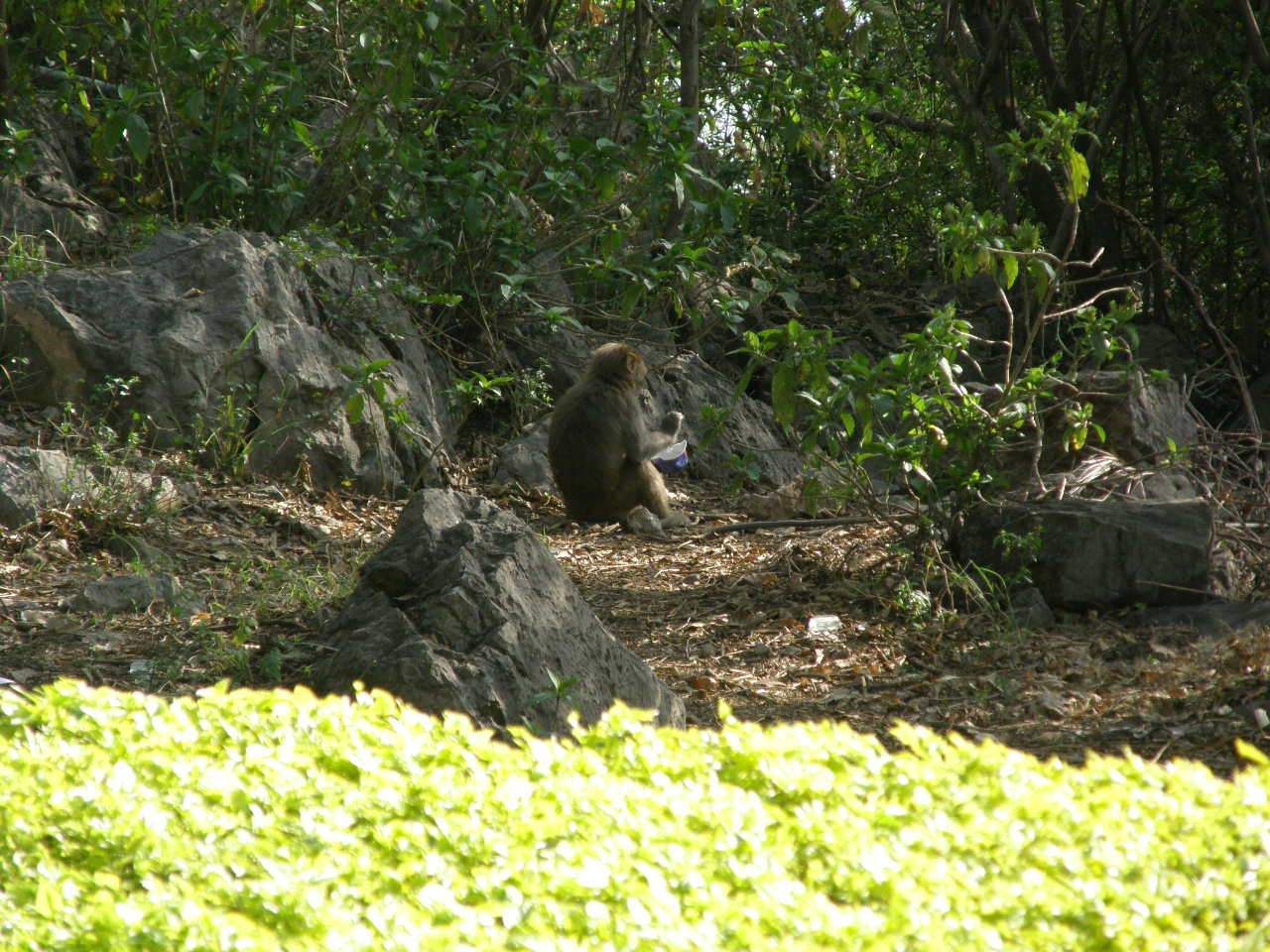
Rhesus macaques near the Daman-e-Koh tourist area.

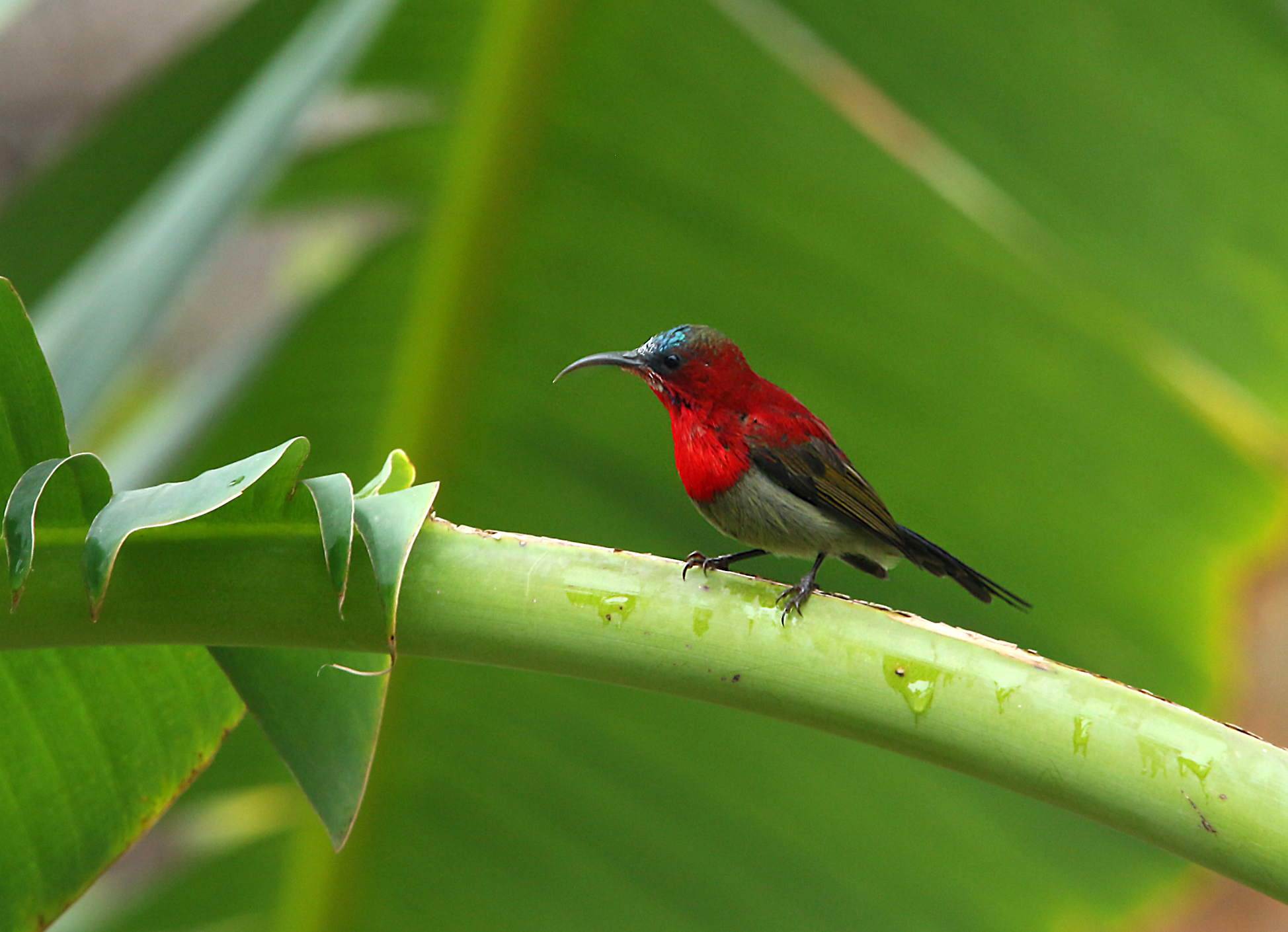
A crimson sunbird in the hills.

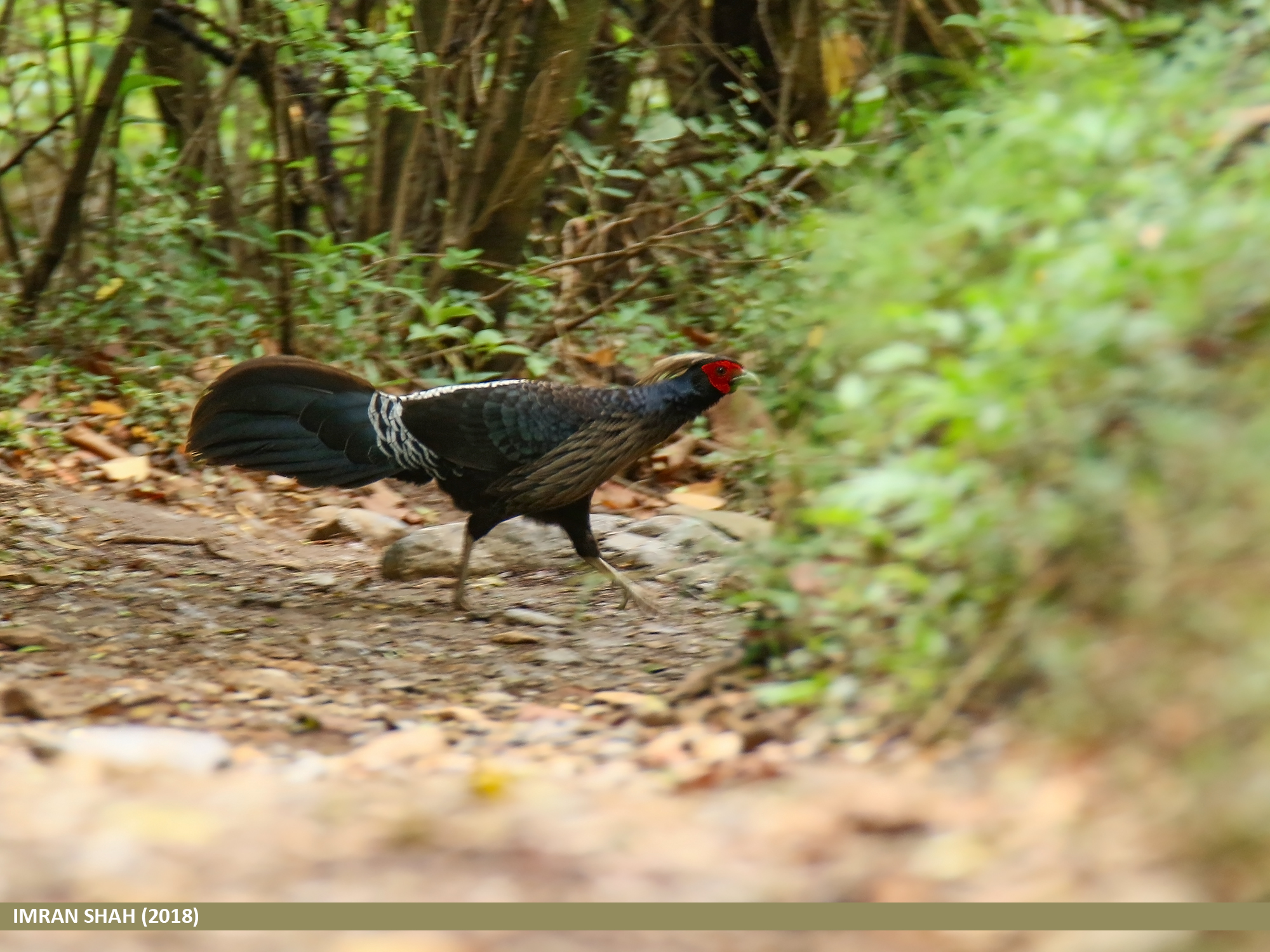
Kalij pheasant in the undergrowth.

== Bird watching ==
The Margallas are an excellent place for bird watchers. The area is home to a large number of birds, including robins, sparrows, kites, crows, larks, paradise flycatchers, black partridge, shrikes, pheasants, spotted doves, Egyptian vultures, falcons, hawks, eagles, Himalayan griffon vulture, laggar falcon, peregrine falcon, kestrel, Indian sparrow hawk, white cheeked bulbul, yellow vented bulbul, cheer pheasant, khalij pheasant, golden oriole, collared dove, wheatears and buntings.

The cheer pheasant, indigenous to the Khyber Pakhtunkhwa, was being reared in Margalla Hills as a part of conservation campaign by the World Pheasant Association and Capital Development Authority.

== Environmental conservation ==
The ecology of Margallas faces threats from quarrying by stone-crushing plants, deforestation, illegal encroachments, and buildings, and poachers. Crush plants situated around the hills near Taxila are busy eroding the hills for extracting building material. Deforestation is resulting from fires and illegal felling of trees.

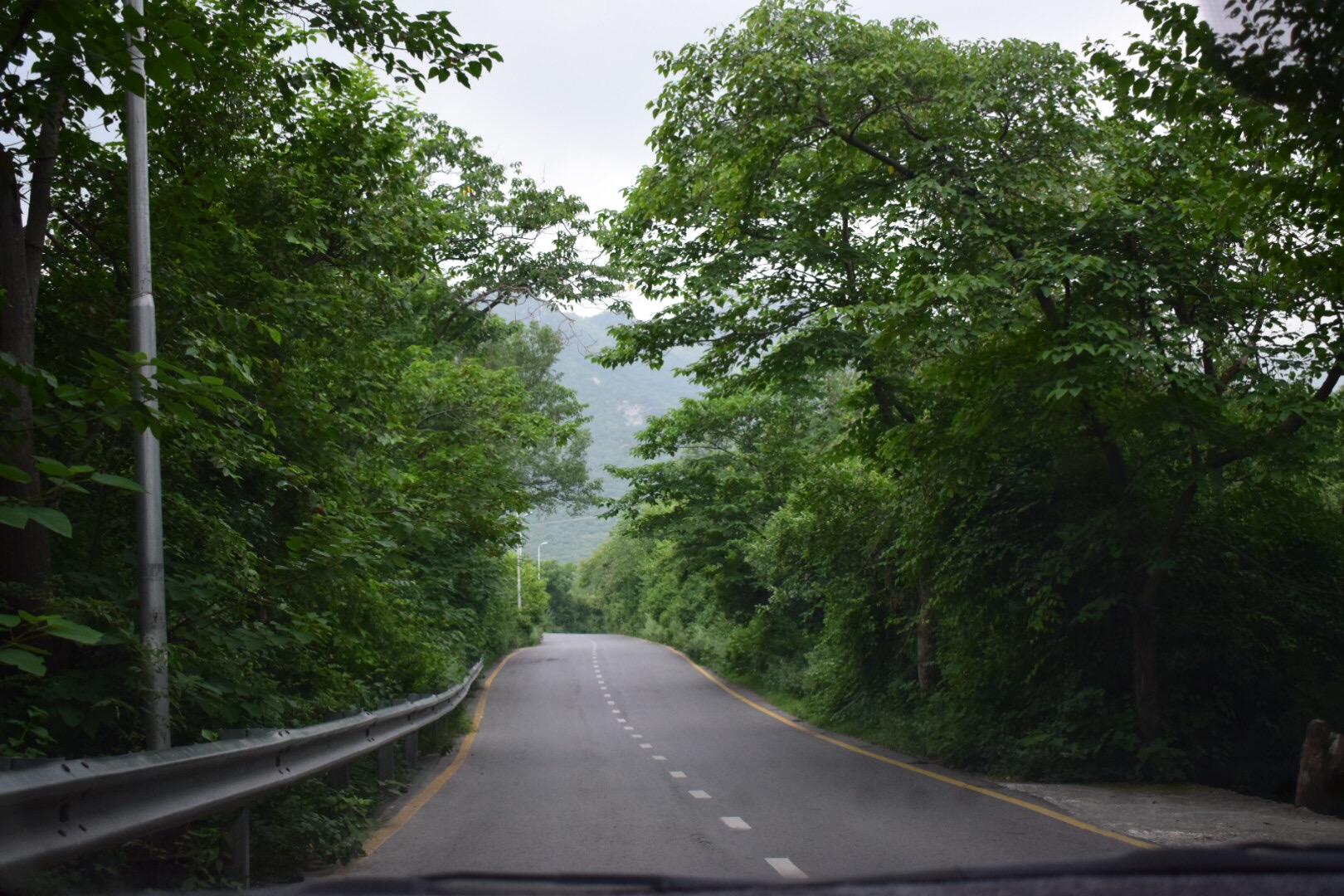
Forested road next to the hills.

=== Margalla Hills Society ===
The Margalla Hills Society was established in 1989.

=== World Wildlife Fund (WWF) Pakistan ===
The WWF-Pakistan's 'Green School Programme', in collaboration with the Capital Development Authority (CDA), carries out 'Eco-Adventure Activities' on the Margalla hills to raise awareness in the school children regarding the conservation of natural environment and about the importance of being environmentally responsible.

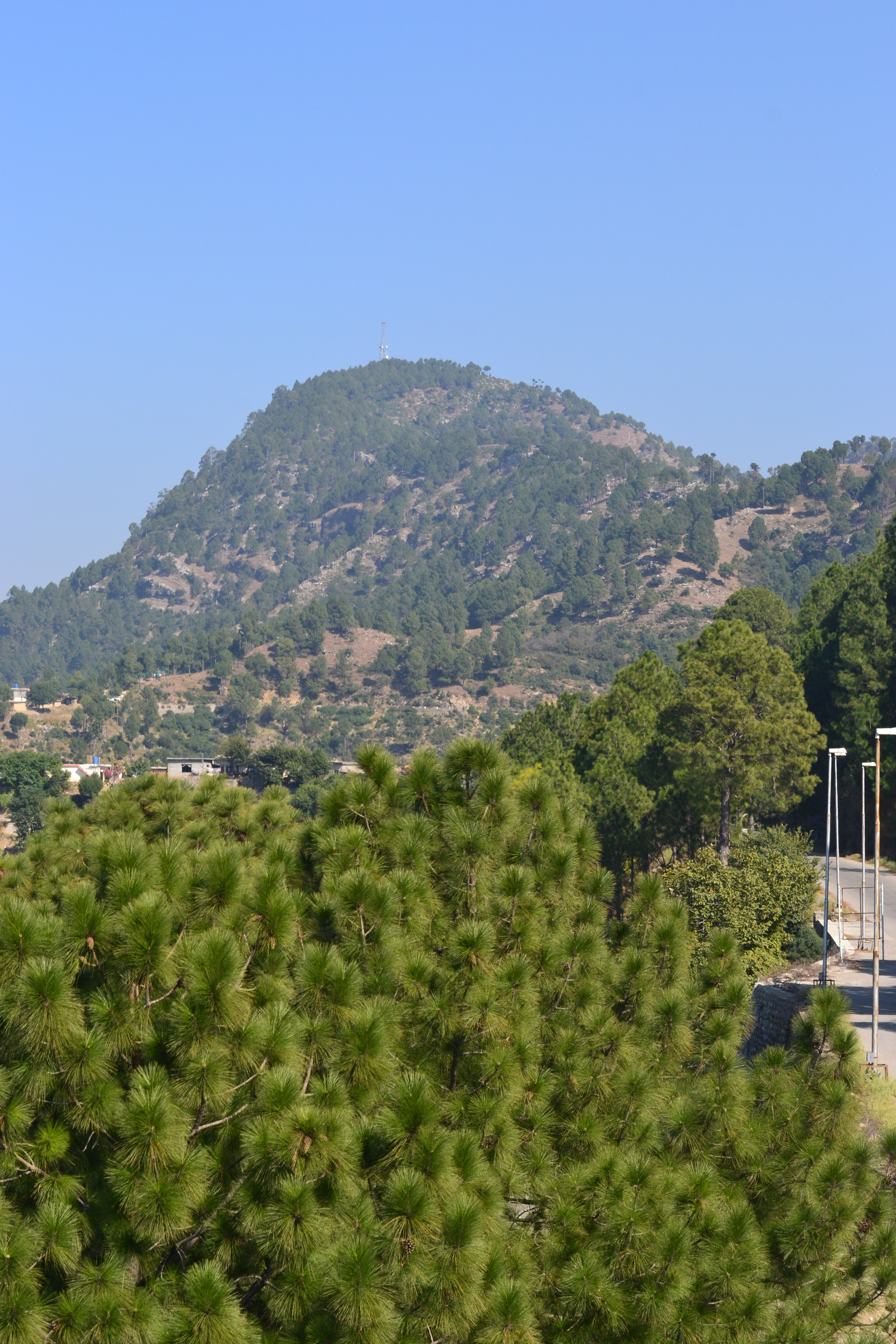
Tilla Charouni, highest peak with 1,604 metres (5,262 ft)

== Events ==
- On 28 July 2010, Airblue Flight 202, an Airbus A321 operating a domestic flight from Jinnah International Airport in Karachi to Benazir Bhutto International Airport in Islamabad, crashed into the Margalla Hills, killing all 152 people on board.
- On 6 January 2012, snowfall over Margalla Hills.
- On 11 February 2016, snowfall over Margalla Hills.

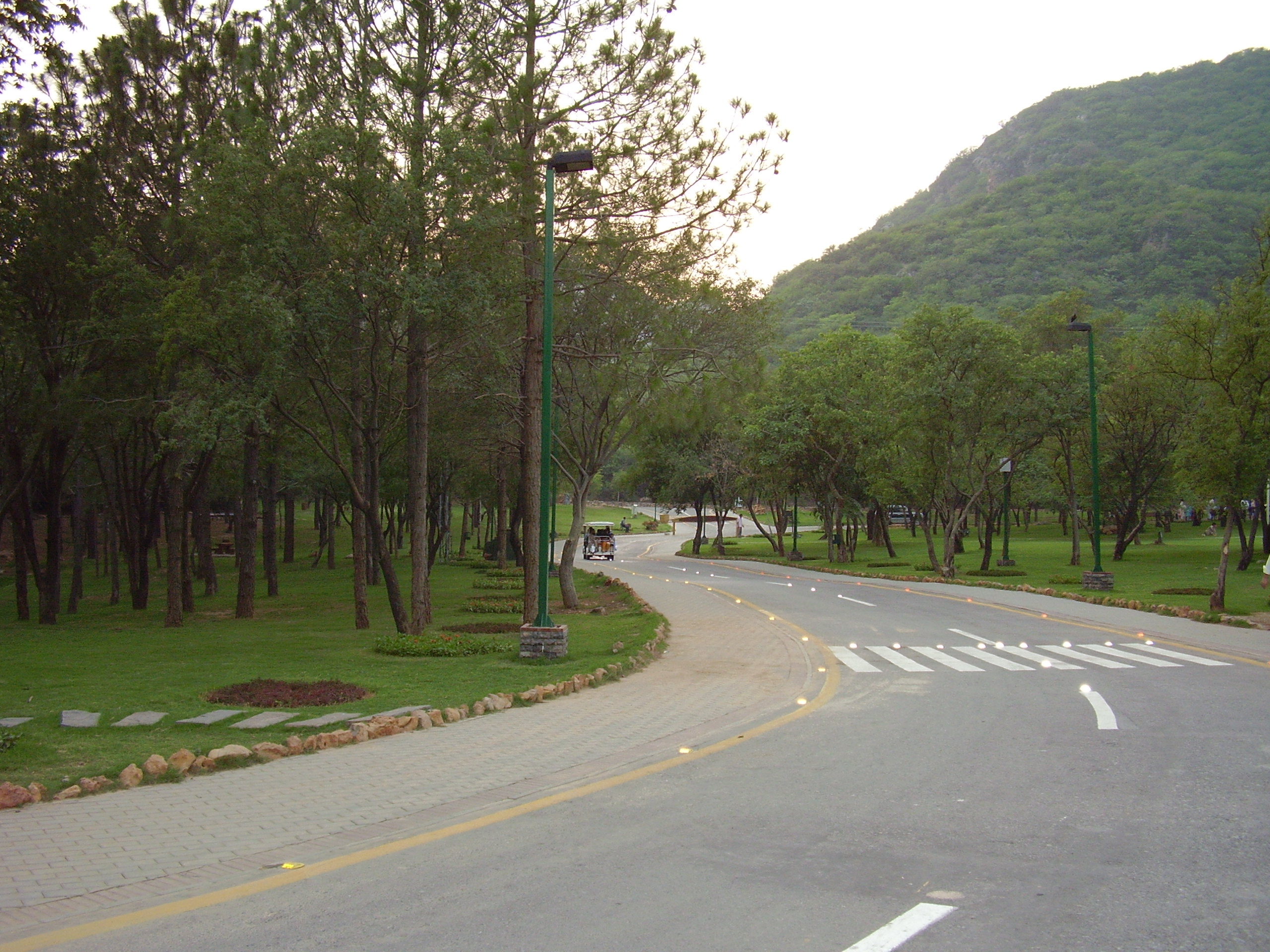
Daman-e-Koh lookout park in the Margalla Hills, Islamabad

== Places in Margalla Hills ==
- Daman-e-Koh
- Pir Sohawa
- Shahdara, Islamabad

== See also ==
- Margalla Hills National Park
- Birds of Islamabad
- Airblue Flight 202
- Faisal Mosque
- List of ecoregions in Pakistan
- Indomalayan realm

=== Related ecoregions ===
- Himalayan subtropical broadleaf forests
- Brahmaputra Valley semi-evergreen forests
- Terai–Duar savanna and grasslands
- Meghalaya subtropical forests
- Mizoram–Manipur–Kachin rain forests
- Western Himalayan broadleaf forests
- Aravalli West Thorn Scrub Forests
