= Timeline of cultivation and domestication in South and West Asia =

South and West Asia consists of a wide region extending from the present-day country of Turkey in the west to Bangladesh and India in the east.

== Timeline ==
- ~12,350 BC: Bread prepared by Natufian hunter-gatherers at a site in North-Eastern Jordan.
- 10,000 BC: Wheat is cultivated in what is now Iraq.
- 9th millennium BC: Barley (Hordeum vulgare ssp. vulgare) is domesticated in the Fertile Crescent in West Asia. The earliest remains of barley have been discovered at Neolithic sites in West Asia, including Jericho (Palestine) and Abu Hureyra (Syria) from about 8500 years BC. Domestic barley has also been found, in the Zagros Mountains, at the Neolithic sites of Ali Kosh (Iran) and Jarmo (Iraq), dated between 7000 and 8000 BC, and in South Asia at the Neolithic site of Mehrgarh (Pakistan) from about 7000 BC.
- 6th millennium BC: Cotton is domesticated in the Old World in Neolithic Mehrgarh, Pakistan. In 2002, mineralized fibers found in a copper bead from Mehrgarh, in the Kachi plain of Balochistan, Pakistan, were determined to be cotton (Gossypium sp.). These are the earliest known example of cotton in the Old World.
- 3rd millennium BC: Rice, is introduced into South Asia from China: Rice, first domesticated in the Yangtze River valley in China 10 KYA to 8 KYA, is introduced into South Asia.
- 2600–2200 BC: Chicken is domesticated in the Indus Valley. The domestic chicken is descended primarily from the red junglefowl (Gallus gallus) and is scientifically classified as the same species. The traditional poultry farming view, is stated in Encyclopædia Britannica (2007): "Humans first domesticated chickens of Indian origin for the purpose of cockfighting in Asia, Africa, and Europe. Very little formal attention was given to egg or meat production... " In the last decade there have been a number of genetic studies. According to one study, a single domestication event occurring in the region of modern Thailand created the modern chicken with minor transitions separating the modern breeds. However, that study was later found to be based on incomplete data, and recent studies point to multiple maternal origins in Southeast, East and South Asia, with the clade found in the Americas, Europe, Middle East, and Africa, originating from the Indian subcontinent, where a large number of unique haplotypes occur. It has been claimed (based on paleoclimatic assumptions) that chickens were domesticated in Southern China in 6000 BC. However, according to a recent study, "it is not known whether these birds made much contribution to the modern domestic fowl. Chickens from the Harrapan culture of the Indus Valley (2500-2100 BC), in what today is Pakistan, may have been the main source of diffusion throughout the world."

== See also ==
- Timeline of mathematical innovation in South and West Asia
