= James Mill =

Scottish economist (1773–1836)

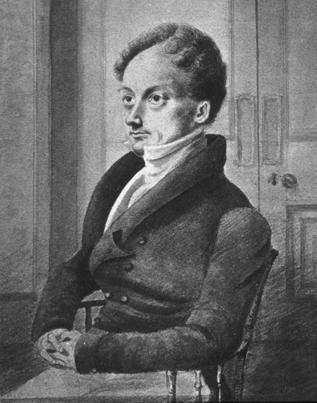
- Born: James Milne; 6 April 1773; Northwater Bridge, parish of Logie Pert, Angus, Scotland
- Died: 23 June 1836 (aged 63); Kensington, London, England
- Spouse: Harriet Burrow
- Children: John Stuart Mill

Education
- Education: University of Edinburgh

Philosophical work
- Era: Modern philosophy: 19th-century philosophy
- Region: Western philosophy: British philosophy; Scottish philosophy
- School: Associationism; Classical liberalism Economic liberalism Ricardian economics Utilitarianism
- Main interests: Psychology; Ethics; Economics
- Notable works: The History of British India (1817)

James Mill (born James Milne; 6 April 1773 – 23 June 1836) was a Scottish historian, economist, and political theorist, who was a founder of the Ricardian school of economics. He wrote the influential The History of British India (1817) which divided Indian history into three parts: Hindu, Muslim and British.

Mill was the father of John Stuart Mill, the paradigmatic philosopher of liberalism.

== Biography ==
James Milne, later known as James Mill, was born in Northwater Bridge, in the parish of Logie Pert, Angus, Scotland, the son of James Milne, a shoemaker and small farmer. His mother, Isabel Fenton, of a family that had suffered from connection with the Stuart rising, resolved that he should receive a first-rate education, and after the parish school they sent him on to the Montrose Academy, where he remained until the unusual age of seventeen and a half. He then entered the University of Edinburgh, where he distinguished himself as a Greek scholar.

In October 1789, he was ordained as a minister of the Church of Scotland, but met with little further success. According to John Stuart Mill's Autobiography, his father, though "educated in the creed of Scotch Presbyterianism, had, by his own studies and reflections, been early led to reject not only the belief in Revelation, but the foundations of what is commonly called Natural Religion." From 1790 to 1802, while supporting himself by various tutorships, he also pursued various historical and philosophical studies. With little prospect of a career in Scotland, in 1802, he went to London in company with Sir John Stuart of Fettercairn, then member of parliament for Kincardineshire, and devoted himself to his literary work. From 1803 to 1806, he was editor of an ambitious periodical called the Literary Journal, which tried to give a summary view of all the leading departments of human knowledge. During this time, he also edited the St James's Chronicle, published by the same proprietor. In 1804, he wrote a pamphlet on the corn trade, arguing against a tariff (or 'bounty') on the export of grain. In 1805, he published a translation (with notes and quotations) of An Essay on the Spirit and Influence of the Reformation of Luther by Charles de Villers on the Reformation, and an attack on the alleged vices of the papal system. About the end of this year, he began work on The History of British India, which was to occupy him for twelve years, rather than the three or four that he had expected.

In that year, too, he married Harriet Burrow, whose mother, a widow, kept what was then known as an establishment for lunatics in Hoxton. They took a house in Pentonville where their eldest son John Stuart Mill was born in 1806.

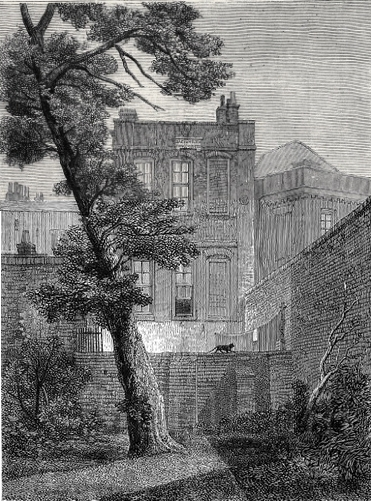
The back of No. 19, York Street (1848). In 1651, John Milton moved into a "pretty garden-house" in Petty France. He lived there until the Restoration. Later it became No. 19 York Street, belonged to Jeremy Bentham, was occupied successively by James Mill and William Hazlitt, and was demolished in 1877.

In 1808, he became acquainted with Jeremy Bentham, who was twenty-five years his senior and, for many years, his chief companion and ally. He adopted Bentham's principles in their entirety, and determined to devote all his energies to bringing them before the world. Between 1806 and 1818, he wrote for the Anti-Jacobin Review, the British Review and The Eclectic Review; but there is no means of tracing his contributions. In 1808, he began to write for the more prominent Edinburgh Review, to which he contributed steadily till 1813, his first known article being "Money and Exchange". He also wrote on Spanish America, China, Francisco de Miranda, the East India Company, and freedom of the press. In the Annual Review for 1808, two articles of his are traced – a "Review of Fox's History", and an article on "Bentham's Law Reforms", probably his first published notice of Bentham. In 1811, he co-operated with William Allen (1770–1843), a Quaker and chemist, in a periodical called the Philanthropist. He contributed largely to every issue – his principal topics being Education, Freedom of the Press, and Prison Discipline (under which he expounded Bentham's Panopticon). He made powerful onslaughts on the Church in connection with the Bell and Lancaster controversy, and took a part in the discussions that led to the foundation of the University of London in 1825. In 1814, he wrote a number of articles, containing an exposition of utilitarianism, for the supplement to the fifth edition of the Encyclopædia Britannica, the most important being those on "Jurisprudence", "Prisons", "Government" and "Law of Nations".

The History of British India was published in 1818, and obtained a great immediate and enduring success. It brought about a matching change in the author's fortunes, and in the year following, he was appointed an official in India House in the important department of the Examiner of Indian Correspondence. He gradually rose through the ranks until, in 1830, he was appointed head of the office, with a salary of £1900, raised in 1836 to £2000. His great work on economics, the Elements of Political Economy, appeared in 1821 (3rd and revised ed. 1825).

From 1824 to 1826, Mill contributed a number of articles to The Westminster Review, the organ of the Radical party, in which he attacked the Edinburgh and the Quarterly Reviews, and the ecclesiastical establishment. In 1829, appeared the Analysis of the Phenomena of the Human Mind. From 1831 to 1833, Mill was largely occupied in the defence of the East India Company, during the controversy attending the renewal of its charter, he being in virtue of his office the spokesman of its Court of Directors. For the London Review, founded by Sir William Molesworth in 1834, he wrote a notable article entitled "The Church and its Reform", which was much too sceptical for the time and injured The Westminster Review. Mill himself was an atheist. His last published book was the Fragment on Mackintosh (1835).

== Intellectual legacy ==
=== The History of British India ===
Mill was a proponent of British imperialism, justifying it on utilitarian grounds. He considered it part of a civilising mission for Britain to impose its rule on India. Mill saw his own work for the East India Company as important for the improvement of Indian society. Mill portrayed Indian society as morally degraded and argued that Hindus had never possessed "a high state of civilisation".

Mill preferred to take a more theoretical approach to social subjects than the empirical one common at the time. His best known literary work is his History of British India, in which he describes the acquisition of the Indian Empire by England and later the United Kingdom. In the work, he characterises Indian society as barbaric and Indians as incapable of self-government. He also brings political theory to bear on the delineation of the Hindu civilization, and subjects the conduct of the actors in the successive stages of the conquest and administration of India to severe criticism. The work itself, and the author's official connection with India for the last seventeen years of his life, effected a complete change in the whole system of governance in the country. Mill never visited the Indian colony, relying solely on documentary material and archival records in compiling his work. This fact has led to severe criticism of Mill's History of India by notable economist Amartya Sen.

According to Thomas Trautmann, "James Mill's highly influential History of British India (1817) – most particularly the long essay "Of the Hindus" comprising ten chapters – is the single most important source of British Indophobia and hostility to Orientalism". In the chapter titled General Reflections in "Of the Hindus", Mill wrote "under the glosing exterior of the Hindu, lies a general disposition to deceit and perfidy". According to Mill, "the same insincerity, mendacity, and perfidy; the same indifference to the feelings of others; the same prostitution and venality" were the conspicuous characteristics of both the Hindoos and the Muslims. The Muslims, however, were perfuse, when possessed of wealth, and devoted to pleasure; the Hindoos almost always penurious and ascetic; and "in truth, the Hindoo like the eunuch, excels in the qualities of a slave". Furthermore, similar to the Chinese, the Hindoos were "dissembling, treacherous, mendacious, to an excess which surpasses even the usual measure of uncultivated society". Both the Chinese and the Hindoos were "disposed to excessive exaggeration with regard to everything relating to themselves". Both were "cowardly and unfeeling". Both were "in the highest degree conceited of themselves, and full of affected contempt for others". And both were "in physical sense, disgustingly unclean in their persons and houses".

Max Müller argued against the opinion that Indians were an 'inferior race', not only because such a view was wrong but because it made an Englishman's life there a 'moral exile'. One source of such mistaken notions and 'poison' had been, and still was, Mill's History of British India, which in his view was 'responsible for some of the greatest misfortunes' that had happened to India. Those who were going out to rule India 'should shake off national prejudices, which are apt to degenerate into a kind of madness'.

According to Kundan Singh and Krishna Maheshwari, James Mill interpreted Indian (specifically Hindu) society through European historical categories. Mill described Indians as uncivilized, ignorant, and lacking rational and scientific thinking. His interpretation generalized Indian (Hindu, earlier Hindoo) society as stagnant and justified British colonial rule on the grounds of civilizing a supposedly backward civilization. Mill considered the Hindus hierarchical and oppressive.

=== British politics ===
Mill also played a great part in British politics, and was a dominant figure in the establishment of what was called "philosophic radicalism". His writings on government and his personal influence among the Liberal politicians of his time determined the change of view from the French Revolution theories of the rights of man and the absolute equality of men to the claiming of securities for good government through a wide extension of the franchise. It was under this banner that the Reform Bill was fought and won. His Elements of Political Economy followed up the views of his friend David Ricardo. By 1911, the Encyclopædia Britannica described it as being of mainly historical interest, "an accurate summary of views that are now largely discarded". Among the more important of its theses are:

1. that the chief problem of practical reformers is to limit the increase of population, on the assumption that capital does not naturally increase at the same rate as population (ii. § 2, art. 3)
2. that the value of a thing depends entirely on the quantity of labour put into it; and
3. that what is now known as the "unearned increment" of land is a proper object for taxation.

=== Other areas ===
By his Analysis of the Phenomena of the Human Mind and his Fragment on Mackintosh Mill acquired a position in the history of psychology and ethics. He took up the problems of mind very much after the fashion of the Scottish Enlightenment, as then represented by Thomas Reid, Dugald Stewart and Thomas Brown, but made a new start, due in part to David Hartley, and still more to his own independent thinking. He carried out the principle of association into the analysis of the complex emotional states, as the affections, the aesthetic emotions and the moral sentiment, all which he endeavoured to resolve into pleasurable and painful sensations. But the salient merit of the Analysis is the constant endeavour after precise definition of terms and clear statement of doctrines. He had a great effect on Franz Brentano who discussed his work in his own empirical psychology. The Fragment on Mackintosh severely criticizes the alleged flimsiness and misrepresentations of Sir James Mackintosh's Dissertation on the Progress of Ethical Philosophy (1830), and discusses the foundations of ethics from the author's utilitarian point of view.

== Major works ==
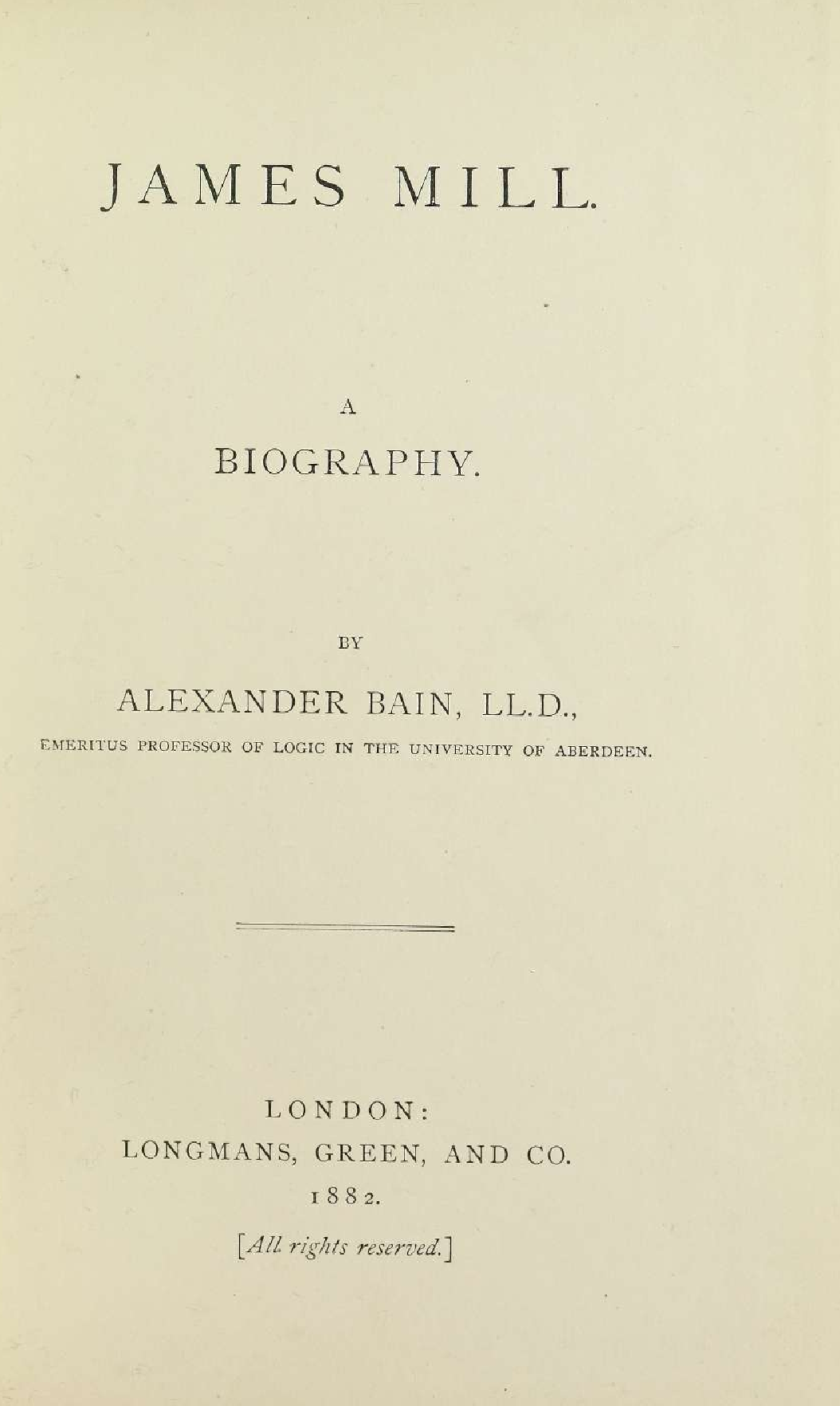
Alexander Bain, James Mill. A biography, 1882

- An essay of the impolicy of a bounty on the exportation of grain, 1804.
- "Lord Lauderdale on Public Wealth", 1804, Literary Journal Vol. IV, No. 1
- Commerce Defended, 1808.
- "Thomas Smith on Money and Exchange", 1808, Edinburgh Review no. XXV, pp. 35–68
- The History of British India, 3 vols., 1817 (and many later editions)
- "Government", 1820, Encyclopædia Britannica
- Elements of Political Economy, 1821
- "Liberty of the Press", 1825, Encyclopædia Britannica
- Essays on Government, Jurisprudence, Liberty of the Press, Education, and Prisons and Prison Discipline, 1823.
- Analysis of the Phenomena of the Human Mind, 2 vols., 1829. Revised edn, 2 vols, 1869.
- Essay on the Ballot and Fragment on Mackintosh , 1830.
- "Whether Political Economy is Useful", 1836, London Review, vol. II, pp. 553–572.
- The Principles of Toleration, 1837.

== See also ==
- Capitalism
- Free trade
- James Tod
- List of liberal theorists
