= Shah Allah Ditta caves =

Ancient site in Islamabad, Pakistan

Coordinates: 33.722°N 72.915°E

Shah Allah Ditta Caves
- Interactive map of Shah Allah Ditta Caves
- Type: Cave
- Periods: Buddhist era
- Cultures: Buddhist, Hindu, Muslim
- Location: Margalla Hills, Islamabad, Pakistan

History
- Built: Approximately 2,400 years ago

Site notes
- Public access: Yes

Shah Allah Ditta caves are an ancient archaeological site located in the Margalla Hills, Islamabad, Pakistan. The caves are believed to be 2,400 years old and are adorned with murals from the Buddhist era. The caves were first used by Buddhist monks for meditation, later by Hindu sadhus, and then by Muslim ascetics during the Mughal period. The village of Shah Allah Ditta, where the caves are located, is named after a Mughal-era dervish.

== Historical significance ==
The Shahullah Dutta Caves are located on the route used by Alexander the Great and Sher Shah Suri to travel from Kabul to the Gandharan city of Taxila. Mughal rulers and other emperors often passed through this region on their way to India from Afghanistan. This village is believed to be more than seven hundred years old. There are various carvings of Buddha on the walls of these caves which are attractive not only to Buddhists but also to history buffs.

== Archaeological findings ==
In the caves, traces of the Buddhist period of the 8th century have been found. Archaeologists have found various Buddha carvings on the cave walls. Before Muslim ascetics took over during the Mughal era, the caves and platform-like formations around the area were first used by Buddhist monks and later by Hindu sadhus for meditation.

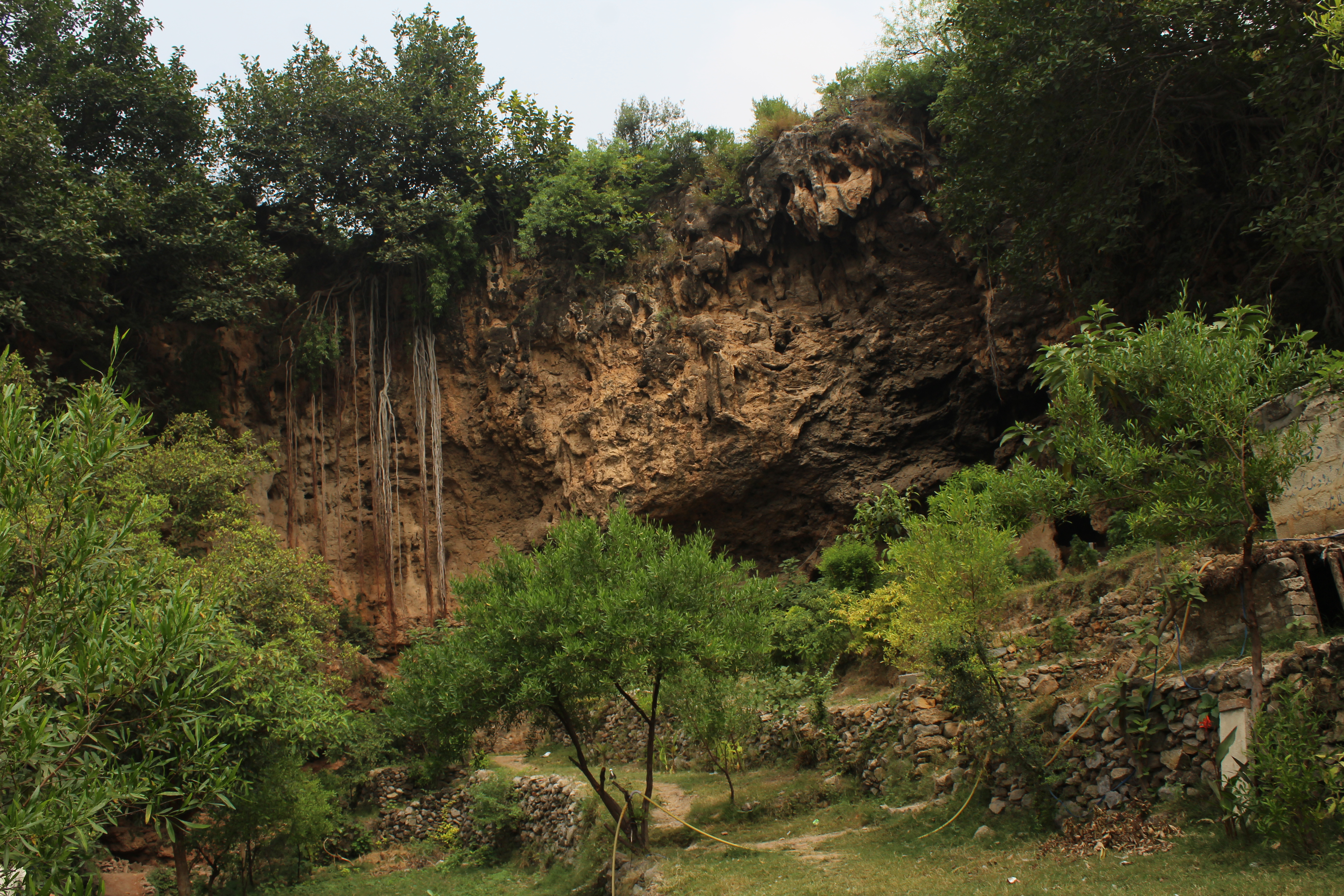
View of the caves.

== Preservation efforts ==
In October 2010, the Capital Development Authority (CDA) approved a plan to preserve this 2,400-year-old archaeological site. The plan covers the conservation of the Buddha caves as well as the adjacent garden known as 'Sadhu ka Bagh’. In 2020, the government plans to review various aspects to further improve the Shahullah Dutta Caves in the Margalla Hills to attract tourists. The Ministry of Information, Broadcasting, National History and Literary Heritage prepared a comprehensive plan for the preservation of historical heritage sites in Islamabad. A three-member committee of archaeologists was constituted to oversee the project and properly collect the artifacts found at the site. The Taxila Institute of Asian Studies, Quaid-i-Azam University, the Natural History Museum and Department of Architecture, and a recent effort by the Mass Communication Department of NUST has urged the government to preserve such sites of Mughal heritage. The Embassy of Japan in Pakistan has reportedly offered to fund the conservation of the caves.

== Tourism ==
Shahullah Dutta Cave is a popular destination for hundreds of national and international visitors. These caves are located at the very edge of the urban areas of the federal capital in Sector E-11. Hidden in the beautiful Margalla Hills lies the archaeological masterpiece of the Shahullah Dutta Caves, which preserve nearly 2,400-year-old Buddhist walls. The caves represent one of the best nests of Buddhism in the region. The number of tourists can be doubled by taking various measures to promote these ancient monuments and increase the facilities for tourists.
