= Mankiali =

You might be looking for:

- Mankiala, a village in Rawalpindi District, Pakistan
  - Mankiala Stupa, a Buddhist stupa found near the village
- Mankiyali, a minority language of northern Pakistan
- Mankhiyai, a village in Madhya Pradesh, India
