= KWX =

KWX, KWx or kwx may refer to:

- Florida Aerocharter (ICAO code: KWX), an American airline; see List of airline codes (F)
- Kaliamawan railway station (station code: KWX), a station in Rawalpindi District, Pakistan
- Khirwar language (ISO-639-3 code: kwx), a Dravidian language spoken in India
- Kiwai Island Airport (IATA code: KWX), Kiwai Island, Papua New Guinea; see List of airports by IATA airport code: K#KW
- KWx, the holding company that operates Keller Williams Realty, an American technology and international real estate franchise
