= Mankiala =

Village in Rawalpindi District, Punjab, Pakistan

Mankiala مانکیالہ
- Village
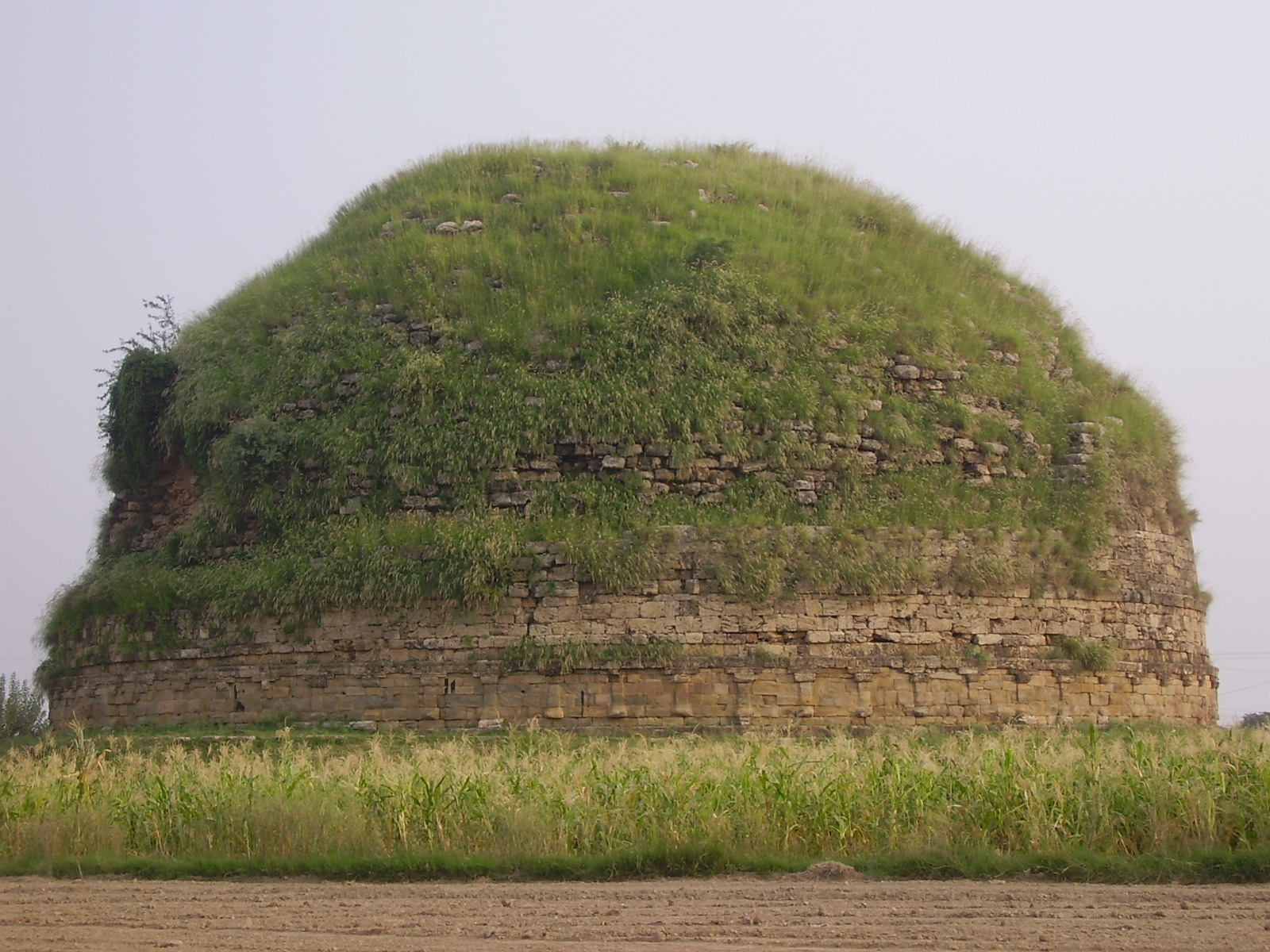
- Mankiala stupa is located in the village of Tope Mankiala

- Location within Pakistan Location within Punjab, Pakistan
- Coordinates: 33.448129°N 73.243588°E
- Country: Pakistan
- Province: Punjab
- District: Rawalpindi
- Time zone: UTC+5 (PST)

Mankiala (Urdu: مانکیالہ; also known as Manikyala and Manikiyala) is a village in the Rawalpindi District of Punjab province of Pakistan, known for the nearby Mankiala stupa – a Buddhist stupa located at the site where, according to legend, Buddha sacrificed some of his body parts to feed seven hungry tiger cubs.

== Location ==
Mankiala is located within the Pothohar Plateau 36 km southeast of Islamabad, Mankiala stupa is located in the village of Tope Mankiala, near the place named Sagri, 2nd near village of Dhakala and 3rd near village of Sahib Dhamyal. It is 36 km southeast of Islamabad, and near the city of Rawalpindi. It is visible from the nearby historic Rawat Fort. It is situated along the Kallar Syedan Road.

== Etymology ==
The town is said to be named after Raja Man or Manik, who is said to have built the village's stupa during the Buddhist era.

The village is said to have been previously known as Manikpur or Maniknagar, and was capital of the ancient Hindu Rakshasas. However, archaeological evidence does not support the conclusion that Manikpur was the capital of the Rakshasas, and that the village's ruins were built during the Buddhist-era.

== Background ==
Mankiala Stupa is a Gandhara era stupa built in the nearby village of Tope Mankiala to memorialize the place where, according to legend, an earlier incarnation of Buddha sacrificed some of his body parts or his entire body to feed seven hungry tiger cubs.

== History ==
Mankiala stupa in 1897.

Mankiala dates from the Gandharan era, around 2000 years ago. The village had been previously described as the former grand capital of the mythological Rakshasas, though no archaeological evidence supports the theory of Mankiala serving as an ancient Hindu capital, and instead suggests that the area's ruins date from the Buddhist period. The settlement during the Buddhist era may have consisted of approximately 2,000 homes, interspersed with monasteries and 15 stupas. The archaeological site is believed to be on the same hillock where the modern village now stands.

Mankiala's stupa was built in the reign of Kanishka (128-151 CE). The ancient settlement is believed to have been destroyed by fire, though there is no indication that it was purposely destroyed.

Mountstuart Elphinstone, the first British emissary to Afghanistan chanced upon this stupa in 1808 AD and penned a detailed account in his memoir 'Kingdom of Caubul' (1815). According to an inscription on a stone the stupa was restored in 1891 by a regiment of the British Indian Army. Raja Usman was architect.

== Relics from stupa ==
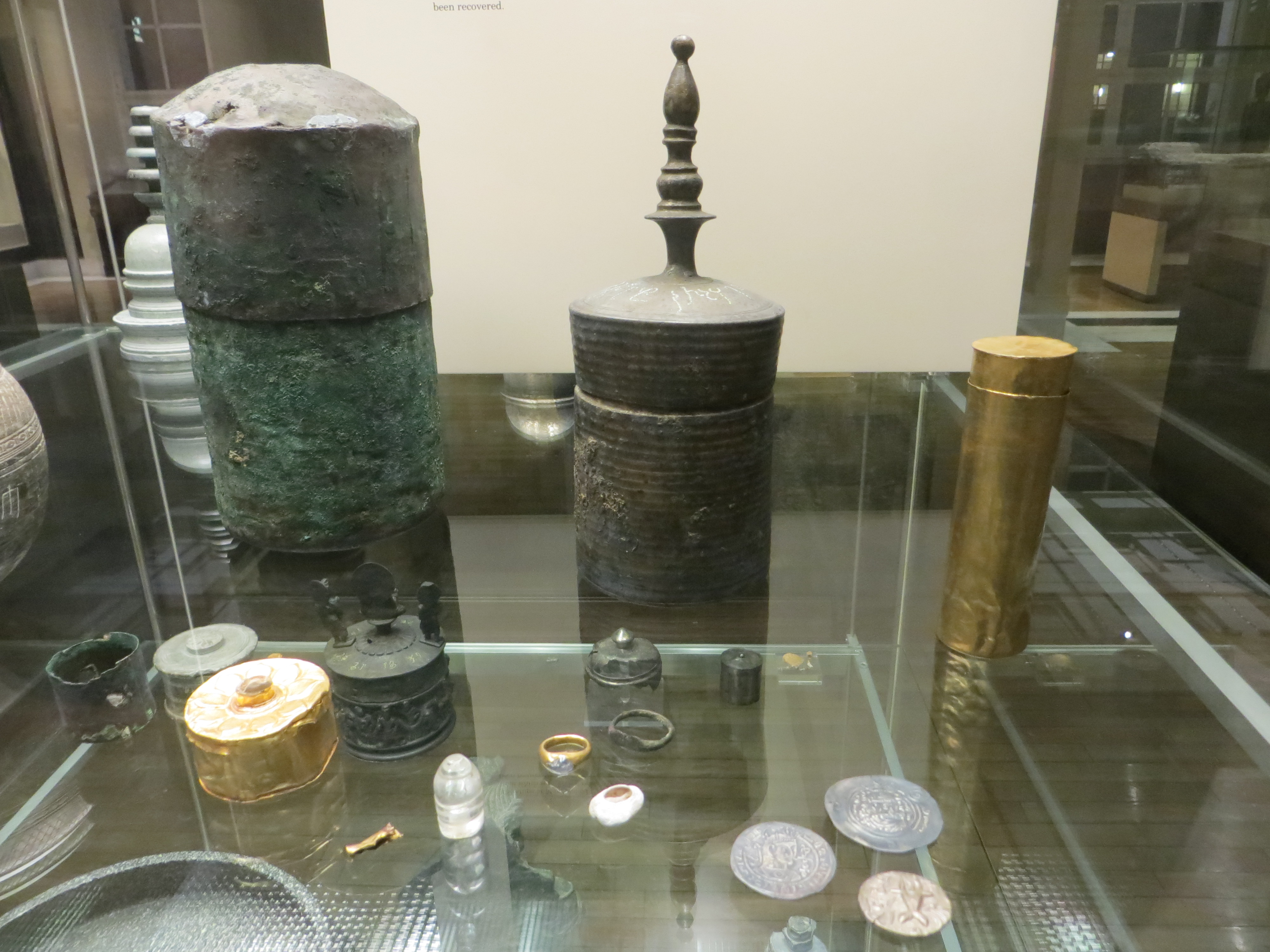
Relic deposits from the Mankiala stupa in the British Museum

Mankiala stupa's relic deposits were removed from the site during British colonial rule, and are now housed in the British Museum. Many were found by Jean-Baptiste Ventura in 1830 between 10 and 20 metres below the top of the dome. They were at one stage owned by the celebrated antiquarian James Prinsep.

The mouth of the stupa has a gaping hole as a result of excavations by relic hunters in the past. It now has a barrier around it for safety reasons.

== Transportation ==
=== Road ===
Nearest entrance to reach Mankiala stupa − Stupa is located along the G.T. Road ( "Sagri More" about more than one k.m. distance), Sagri More on G.T Road and is about 7 k.m. from Rawat Fort .

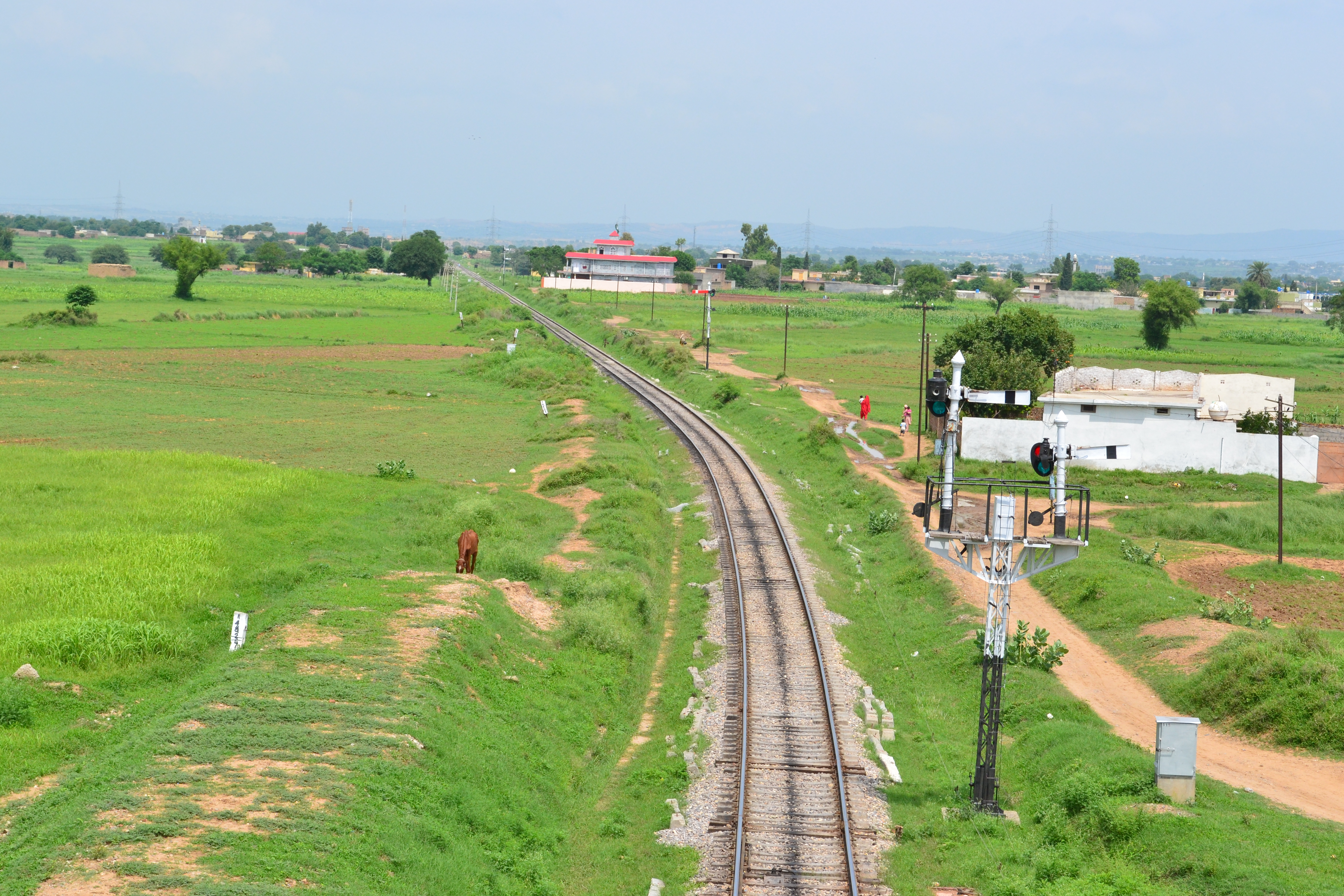
Country side view of Mankiala

=== Rail ===
Mankiala railway station is served by the Karachi–Peshawar Railway Line.

== See also ==
- Manikyala Stupa
- Gandhara
- Taxila
