= Manikyala Stupa =

Buddhist stupa in Punjab, Pakistan

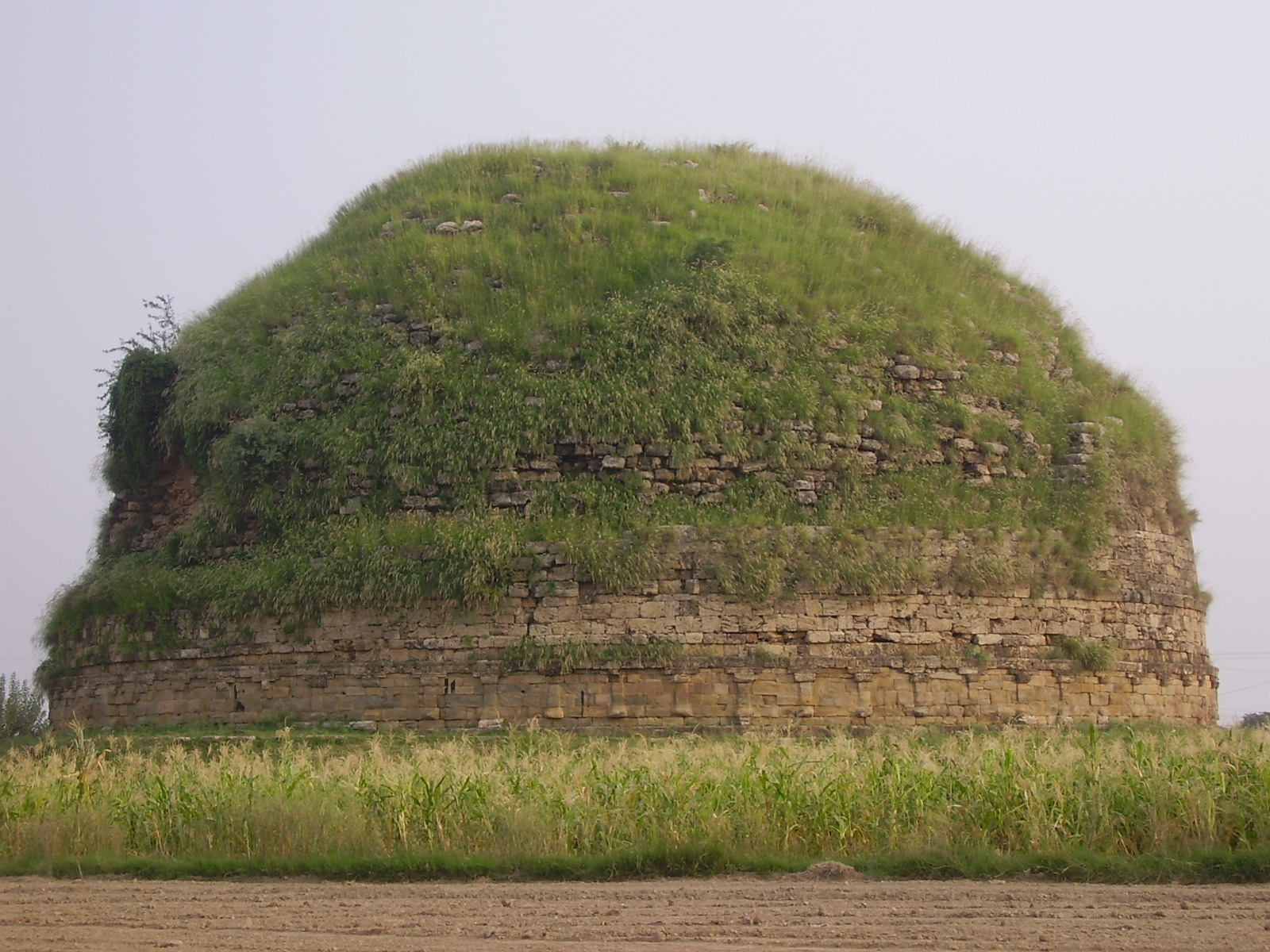
- Manikyala Stupa in 2007

- Location within Pakistan

Religion
- Affiliation: Buddhism

Location
- Location: Tope Mankiala; Punjab; Pakistan
- State: Punjab
- Interactive map of Manikyala Stupa
- Coordinates: 33°26′53″N 73°14′36″E

The Manikyala Stupa (Urdu: مانكياله اسٹوپ) or Mankiala Stupa is a Buddhist stupa near the village of Tope Mankiala, in the Pothohar region of Pakistan's Punjab province. The stupa was built to commemorate the spot, where according to the Jataka tales, an incarnation of the Buddha called Prince Sattva sacrificed himself to feed seven hungry tiger cubs.

== Location ==
Mankiala stupa is located in the village of Tope Mankiala, near the place named Sagri and 2nd near the village of Sahib Dhamial. It is 36 km southeast of Islamabad, and near the city of Rawalpindi. It is visible from the nearby historic Rawat Fort.

== Significance ==
The stupa was built to commemorate the spot, where according to the Jataka tales, the Golden Light Sutra and popular belief, Prince Sattva, an earlier incarnation of the Buddha, sacrificed some of his body parts to feed seven hungry tiger cubs.

== History ==
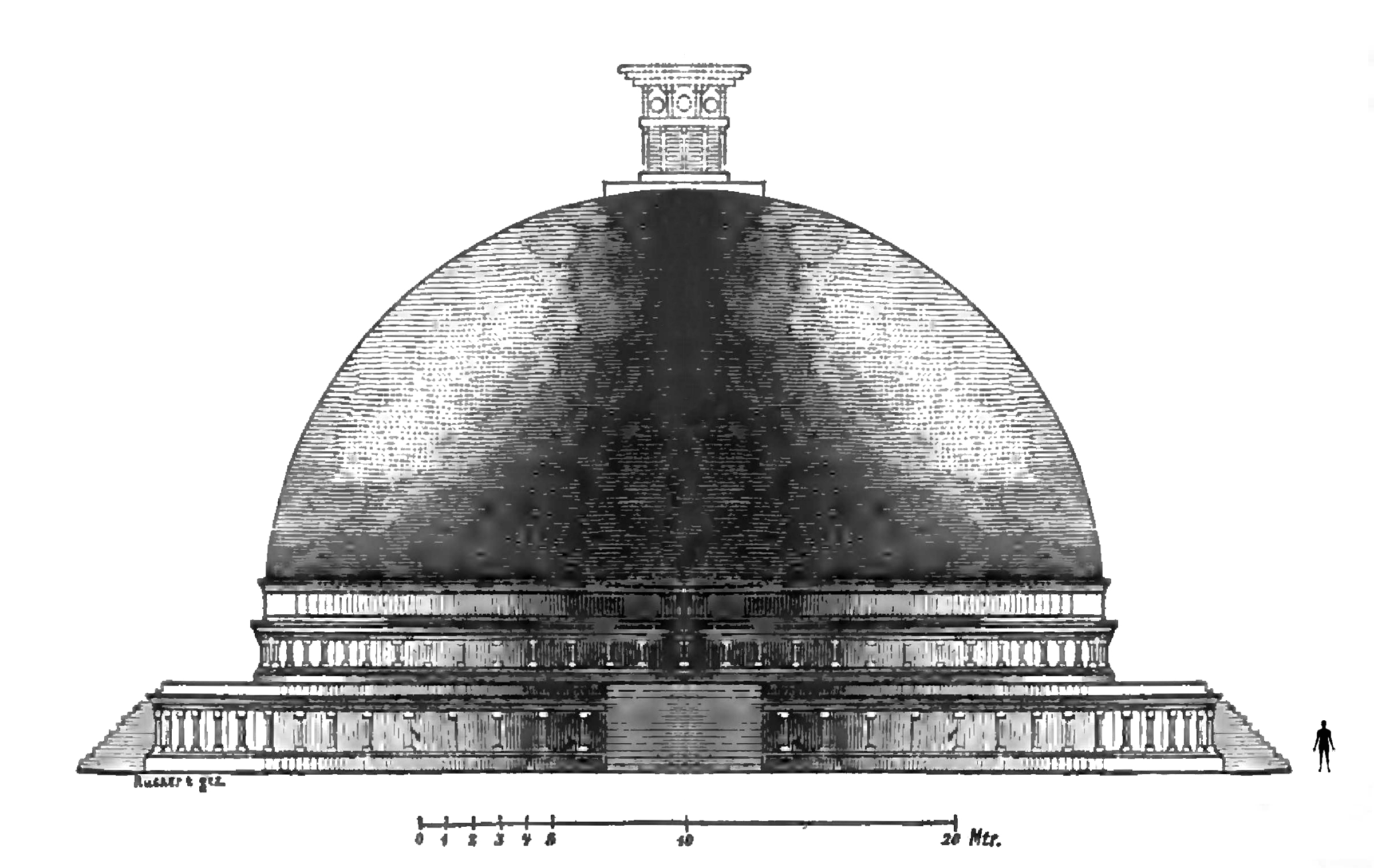
Restored view of the Manikyala Stupa

The stupa is said to have been built during the reign of Kanishka between 128 and 151 CE.

An alternate theory suggest that the stupa is one of 84 such buildings, built during the reign of Mauryan emperor Ashoka to house the ashes of the Buddha. It is said that Emperor Kanishka used to visit this stupa often to pay respects to Buddha during his campaigns.

The stupa was discovered by Mountstuart Elphinstone, the first British emissary to Afghanistan, in 1809– a detailed account of which is in his memoir Kingdom of Caubul (1815).

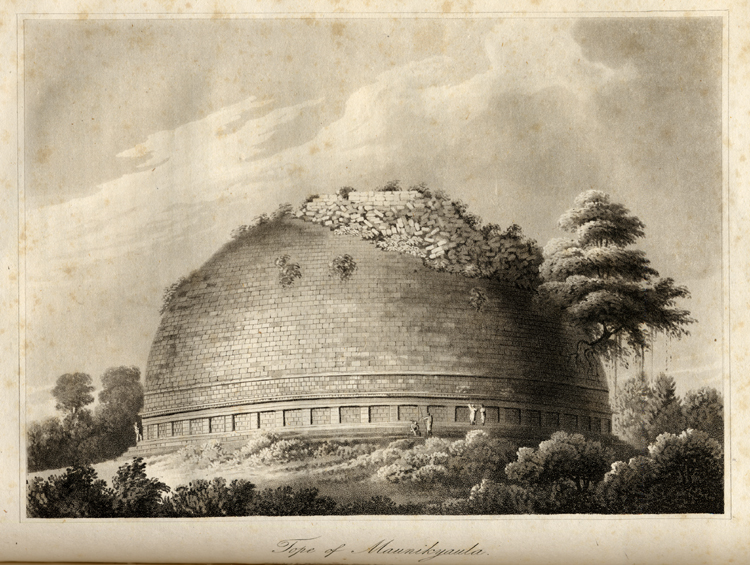
Drawing of Manikyala Stupa as Elphinstone observed it in 1809

The stupa contains an engraving which indicates that the stupa was restored in 1891.

== Relics ==
Mankiala stupa's relic deposits were discovered by Jean-Baptiste Ventura in 1830. The relics were then removed from the site during the British Raj, and are now housed in the British Museum.

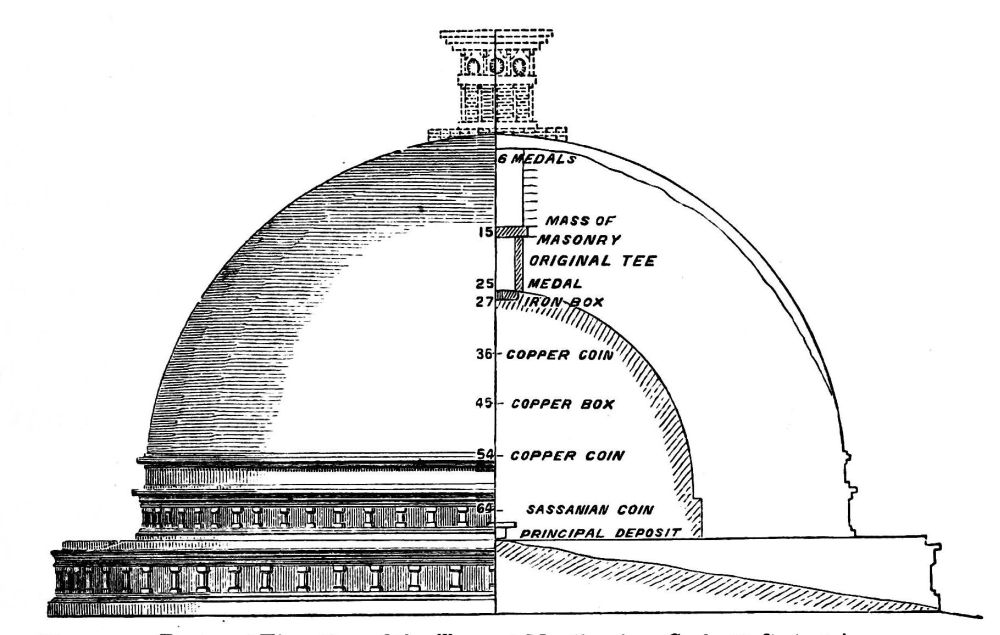
Restored elevation of the stupa– scale 50 ft. to 1 in– showing where the relics were found

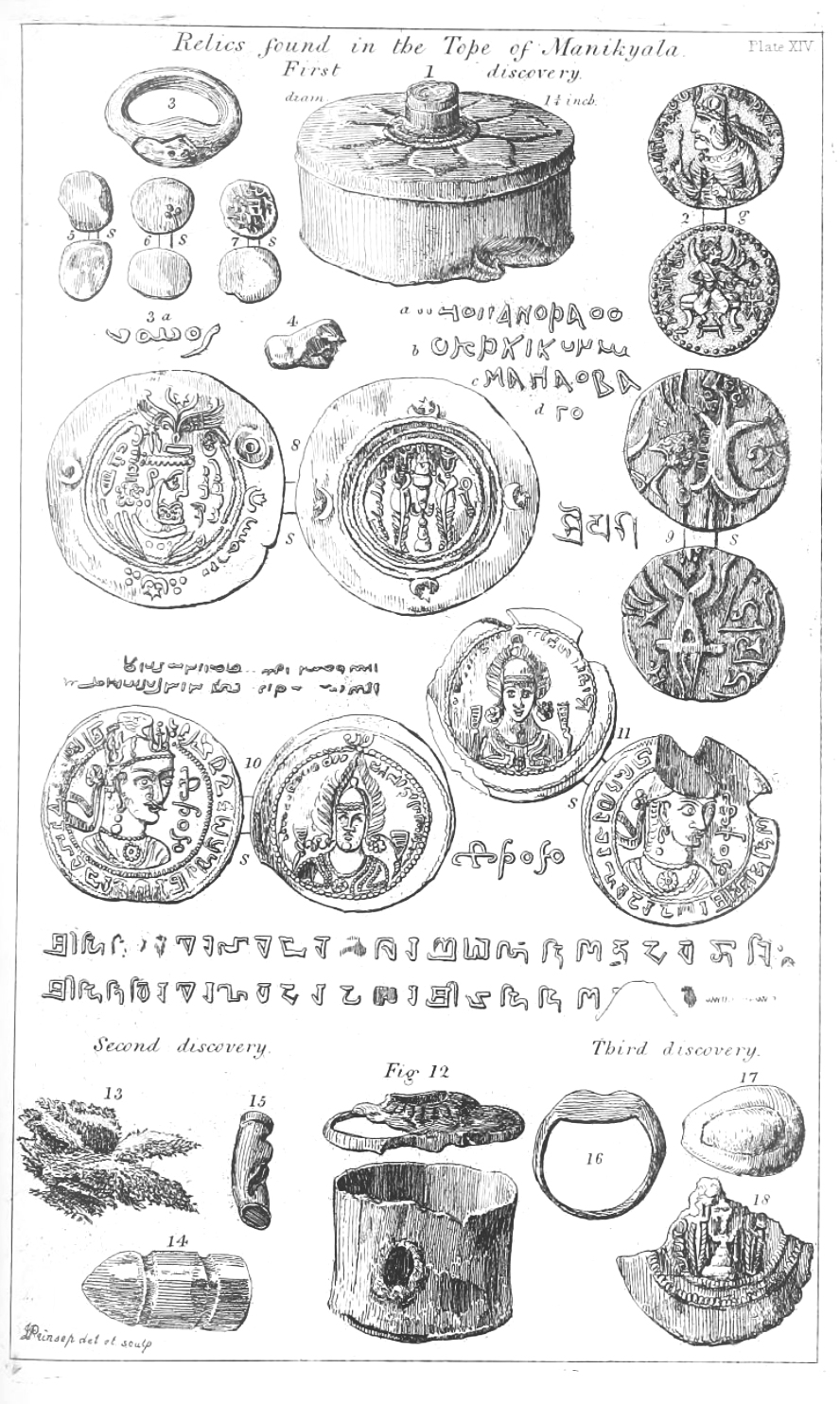
Manikyala relics – Principal deposit

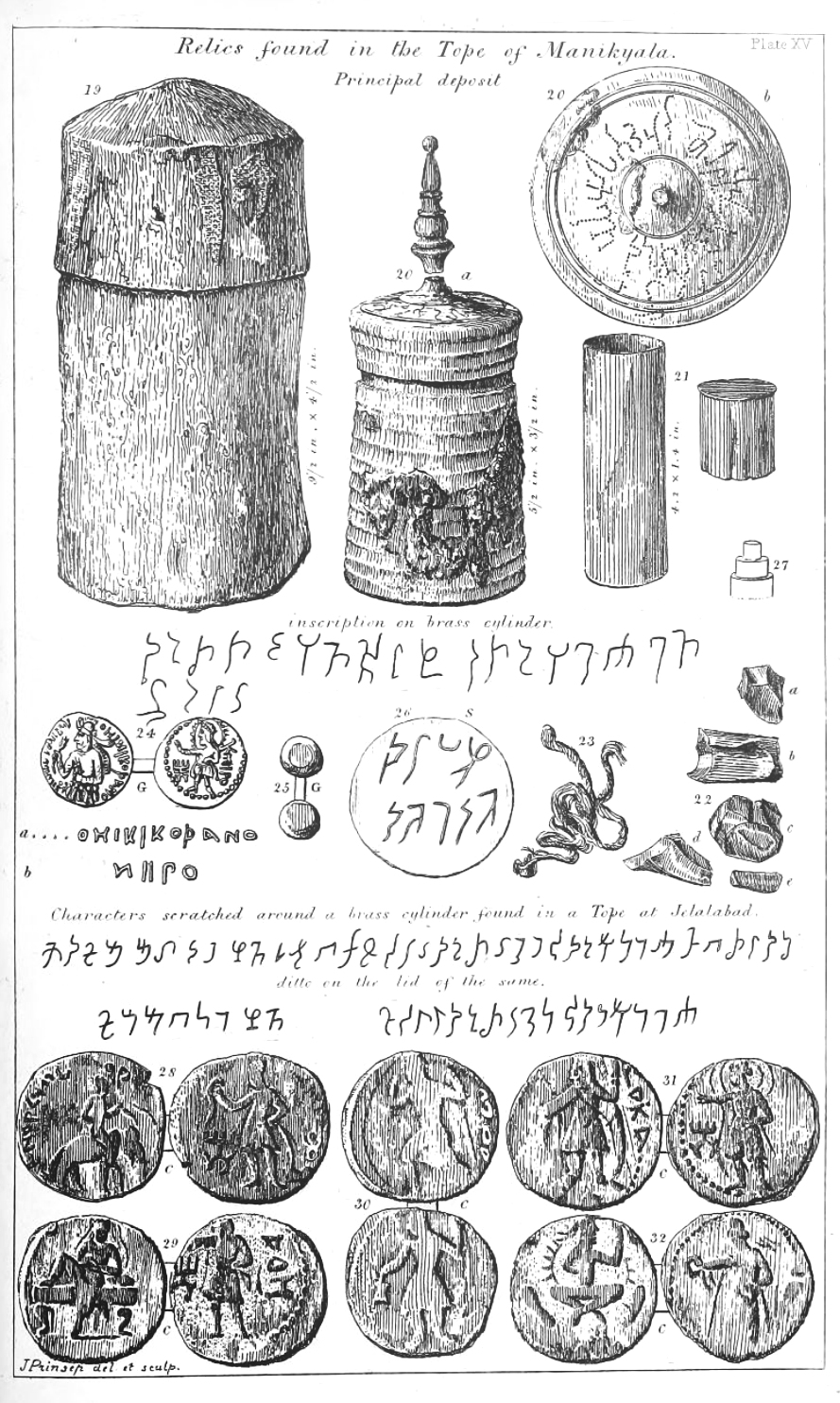
Manikyala relics – First discovery

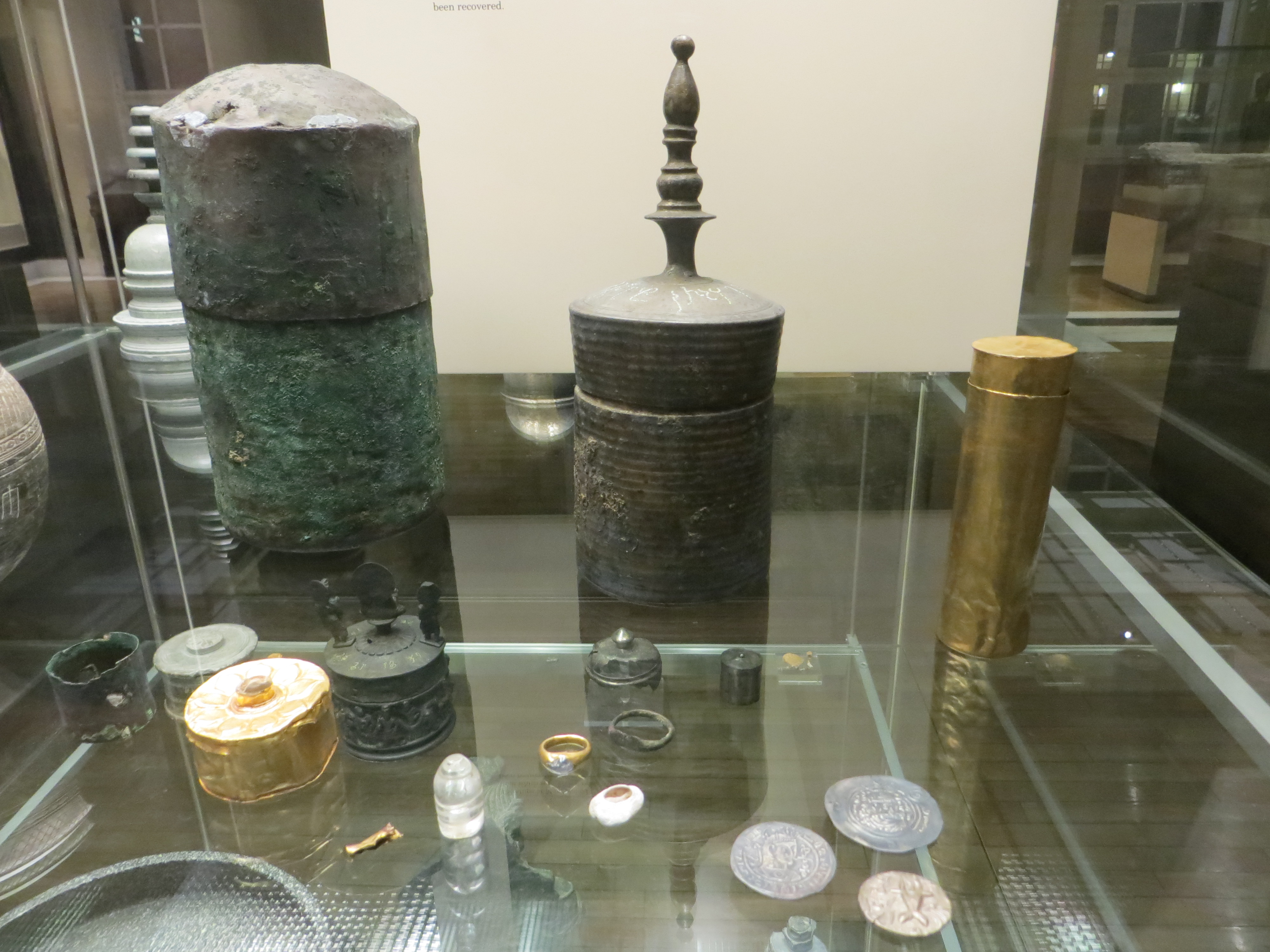
Manikiala hoard – British Museum

== Inscription ==
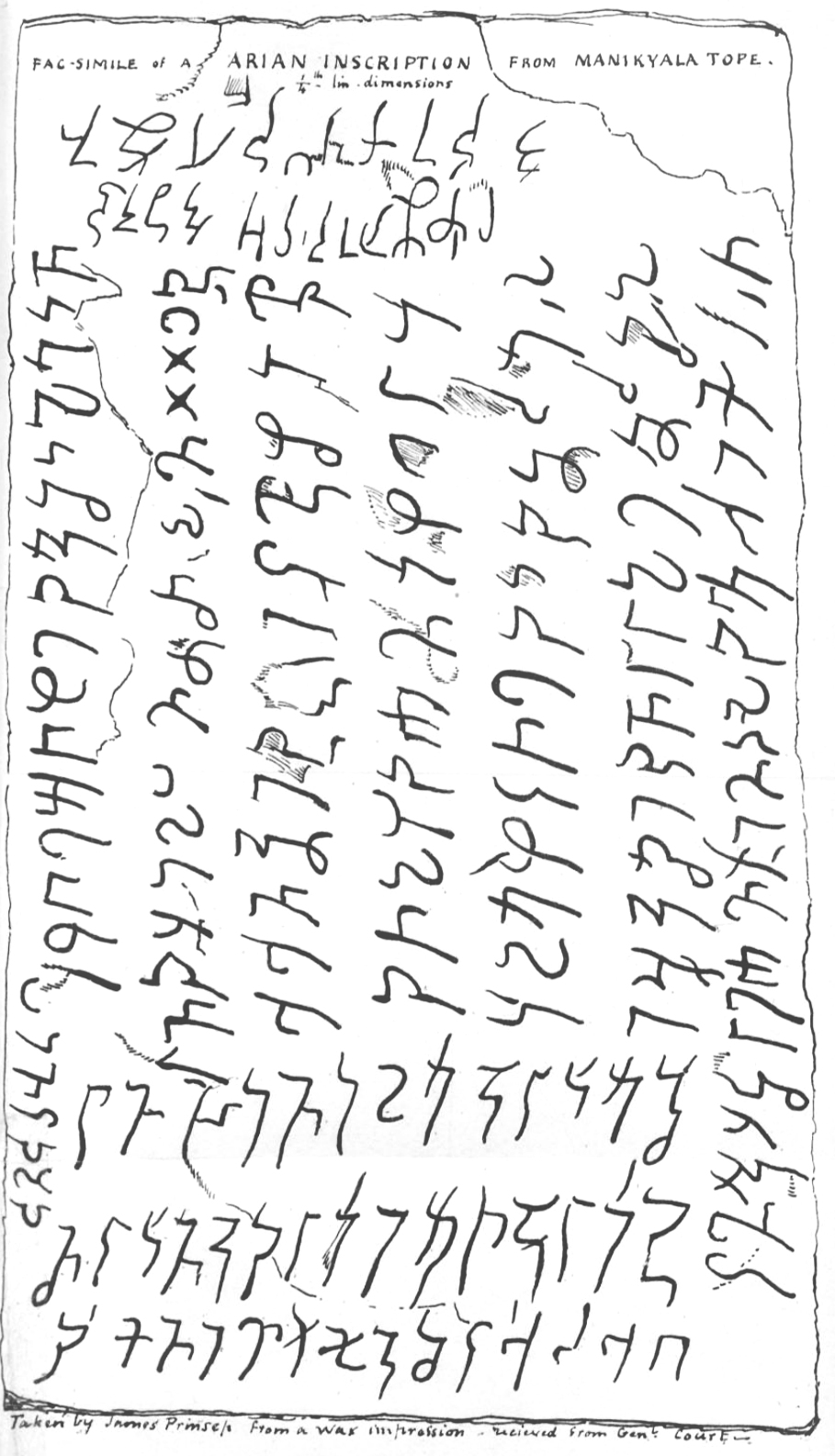
Manikyala Kharoshthi inscriptions

On one of the stones of the stupa there is an inscription which reads as:

Inscription of the Mankiala Stupa
Inscription	Original (Kharosthi script)	Transliteration	English translation
Line 1	𐨯𐨎 𐩄 𐩃 𐩃 𐨀𐨅𐨟𐨿𐨪 𐨤𐨂𐨪𐨿𐨬𐨀𐨅 𐨨𐨱𐨪𐨗𐨯 𐨐𐨞𐨅	Saṃ 10 4 4 etra purvae maharajasa Kaṇe-	In the year 18, of the great king
Line 2	𐨮𐨿𐨐𐨯 𐨒𐨂𐨮𐨣𐨬𐨭𐨯𐨎𐨬𐨪𐨿𐨢𐨐 𐨫𐨫	ṣkasa Guṣanavaśasaṃvardhaka Lala	Kanishka, Lala, increaser of the Kusana line,
Line 3	𐨡𐨜𐨞𐨩𐨒𐨆 𐨬𐨅𐨭𐨿𐨤𐨭𐨁𐨯 𐨐𐨿𐨮𐨟𐨿𐨪𐨤𐨯	daḍaṇayago Veśpaśisa kṣatrapasa	judge, the Satrap Veśpaśi's
Line 4	𐨱𐨆𐨪𐨨𐨂𐨪𐨿𐨟𐨆 𐨯 𐨟𐨯 𐨀𐨤𐨣𐨒𐨅 𐨬𐨁𐨱𐨪𐨅	horamurto sa tasa apanage vihare	donation master - he is in his own monastery
Line 5	𐨱𐨆𐨪𐨨𐨂𐨪𐨿𐨟𐨆 𐨀𐨅𐨟𐨿𐨪 𐨞𐨞𐨧𐨒𐨬𐨦𐨂𐨢𐨰𐨬	horamurto etra ṇaṇabhagavabudhazava	the donation master - here several relics of the Lord, the Buddha,
Line 6	𐨤𐨿𐨪𐨟𐨁𐨯𐨿𐨟𐨬𐨩𐨟𐨁 𐨯𐨱 𐨟𐨀𐨅𐨣 𐨬𐨅𐨭𐨿𐨤𐨭𐨁𐨀𐨅𐨞 𐨑𐨂𐨡𐨕𐨁𐨀𐨅𐨣	pratistavayati saha taena Veśpaśieṇa Khudaciena	establishes, together with the group of three, Veśpaśia, Khudacia, and
Line 7	𐨦𐨂𐨪𐨁𐨟𐨅𐨞 𐨕 𐨬𐨁𐨱𐨪𐨐𐨪𐨵𐨀𐨅𐨞	Buriteṇa ca viharakaravhaeṇa	Burita, the builder of the monastery,
Line 8	𐨯𐨎𐨬𐨅𐨞 𐨕 𐨤𐨪𐨁𐨬𐨪𐨅𐨞 𐨯𐨢 𐨀𐨅𐨟𐨅𐨞 𐨐𐨂	saṃveṇa ca parivareṇa sadha eteṇa ku-	and together with his whole retinue. Through this
Line 9	𐨭𐨫𐨨𐨂𐨫𐨅𐨣 𐨦𐨂𐨢𐨅𐨱𐨁 𐨕 𐨮𐨬𐨀𐨅𐨱𐨁 𐨕	śalamulena budhehi ca ṣavaehi ca	root of good as well as through the Buddhas and disciples
Line 10	𐨯𐨨𐨎 𐨯𐨡 𐨦𐨬𐨟𐨂	samaṃ sada bhavatu	may it always be
Line 11	𐨧𐨿𐨪𐨟𐨪𐨯𐨿𐨬𐨪𐨦𐨂𐨢𐨁𐨯 𐨀𐨒𐨿𐨪𐨤𐨜𐨁𐨀𐨭𐨀𐨅	Bhratarasvarabudhisa agrapaḍiaśae	for the best share of (his) brother Svarabudhi.
Line 12	𐨯𐨢 𐨦𐨂𐨢𐨁𐨫𐨅𐨣 𐨣𐨬𐨐𐨪𐨿𐨨𐨁𐨒𐨅𐨞	sadha Budhilena navakarmigeṇa	Together with Budhila, the superintendent of construction.
Line 13	𐨐𐨪𐨿𐨟𐨁𐨩𐨯 𐨨𐨰𐨅 𐨡𐨁𐨬𐨯𐨅𐨁 𐩅	Kartiyasa maze divase 20	On the 20th day of the month Kārttika.

== Conservation ==
The stupa in 1897

The stupa has not been restored since 1891,(during British rule) and remains largely abandoned. The stupa features a large defect in its mound, which was created by plunderers.

== Access ==
Mankiala's stupa is located near the Mankiala Road in the village of Tope Mankiala. Towards the west, the Mankiala Road intersects the N-5 National Highway, which provides access to Islamabad and Rawalpindi. The site can also be accessed by the Mankiala railway station in the nearby village of Mankiala, which is served by the Karachi–Peshawar Railway Line.

== Gallery ==
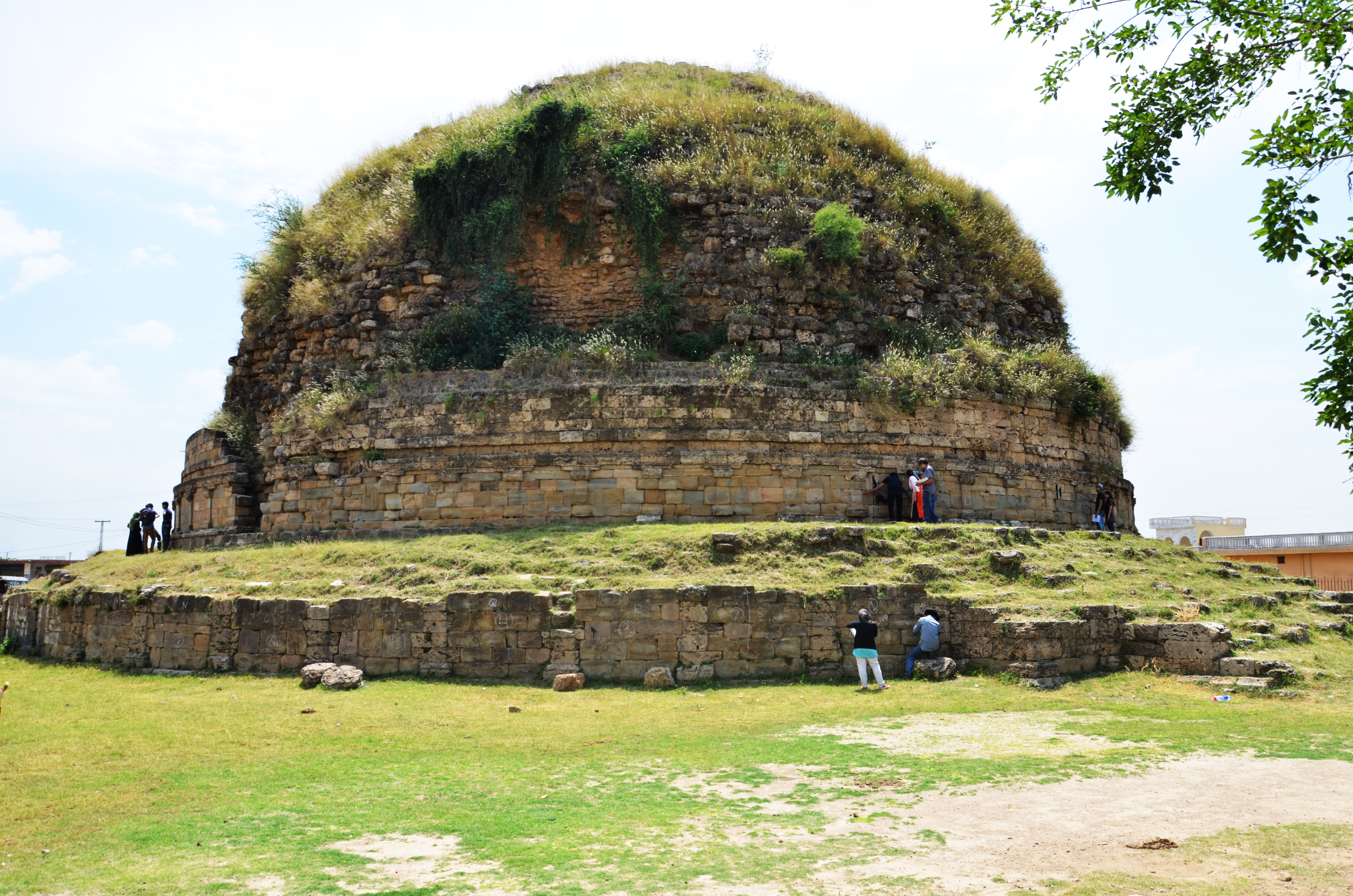
Present-day view of Mankiala Stupa

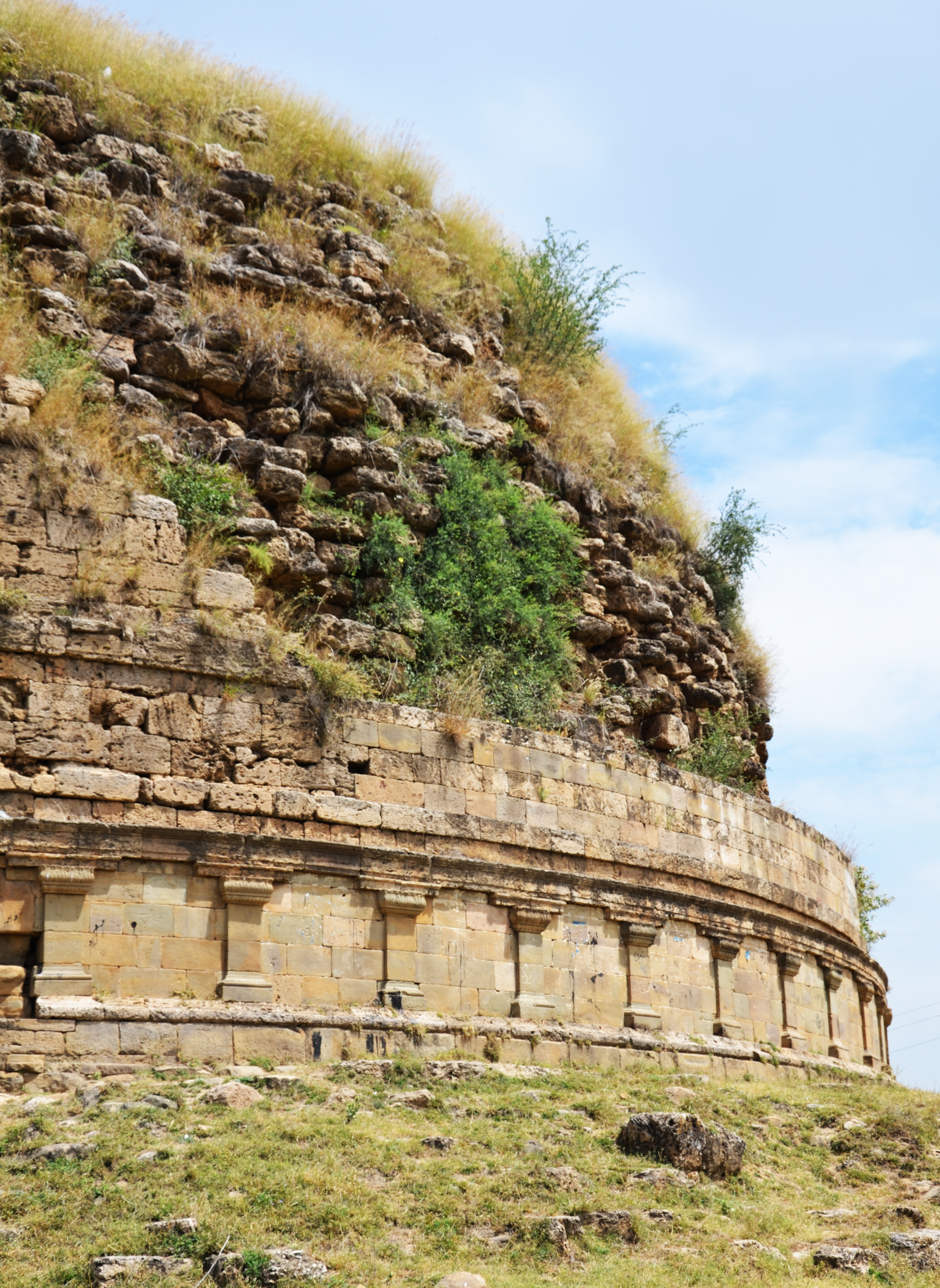
View of the stupa showing columnades

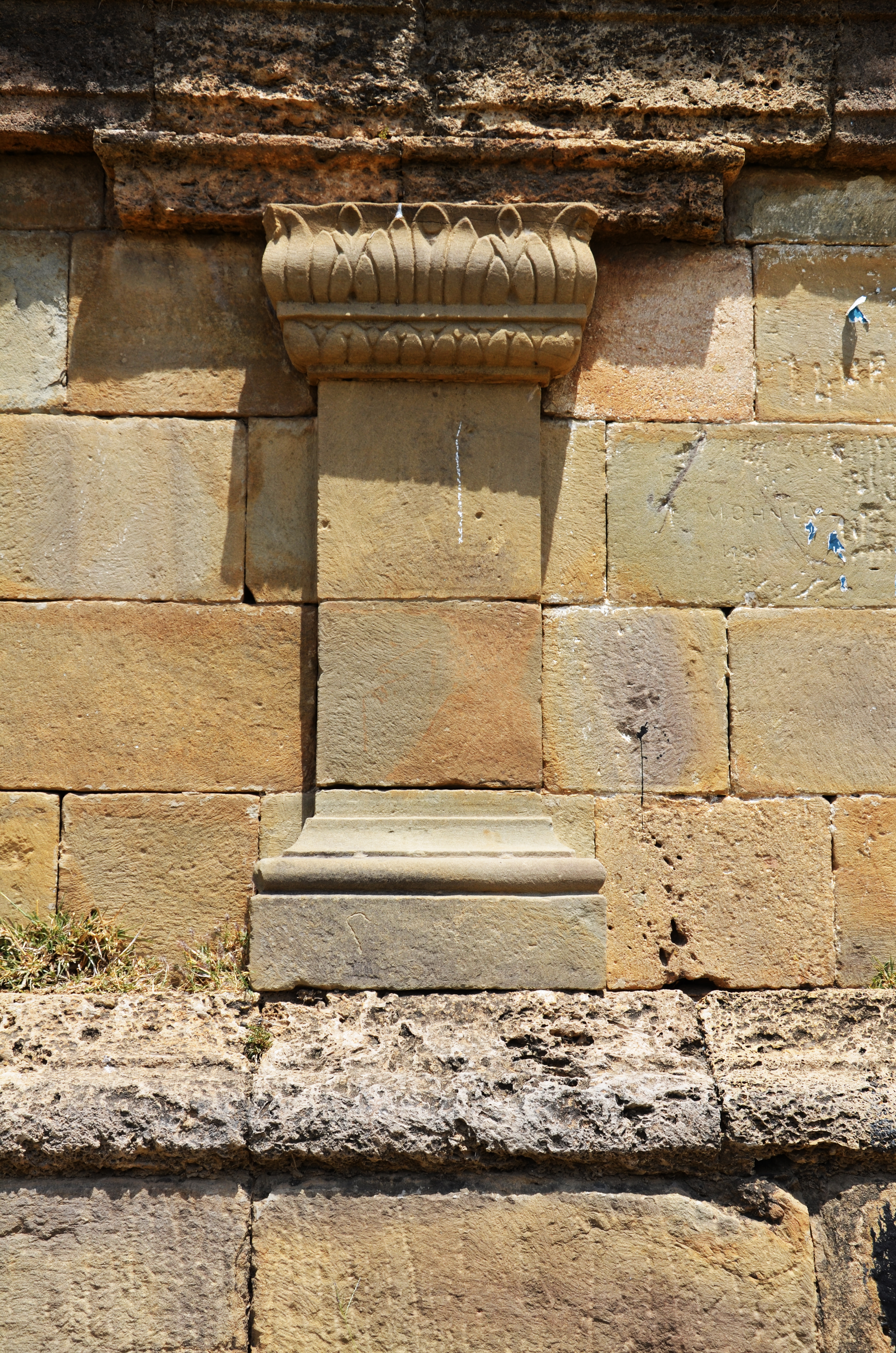
Columnade

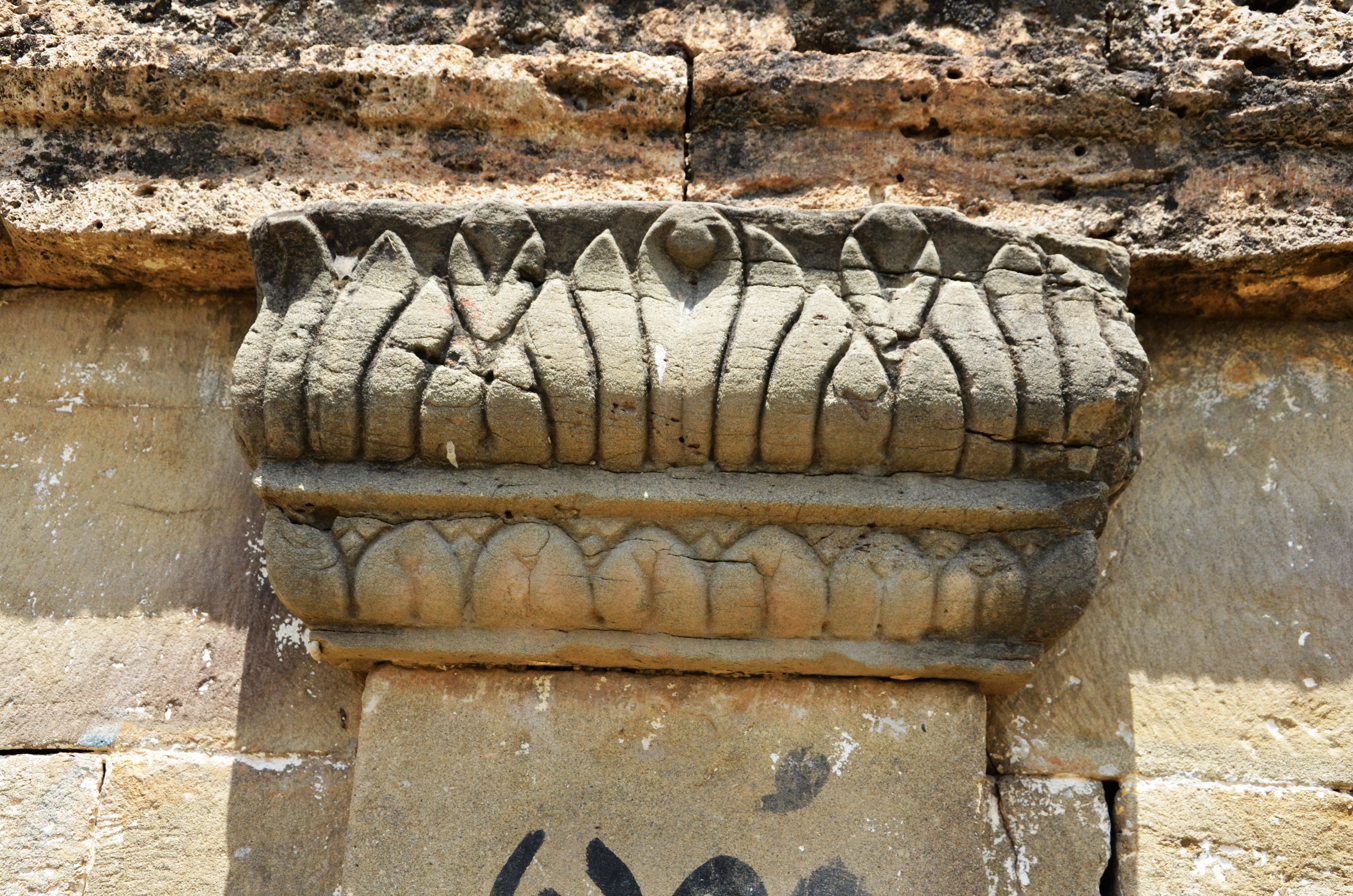
Capital detail

== See also ==
- Takht Bahi
- Gandhara
- Taxila
- Dharmarajika Stupa – largest of the stupas which form the Ruins of Taxila.
