= Prince Sattva =

Previous incarnation of Gautama Buddha

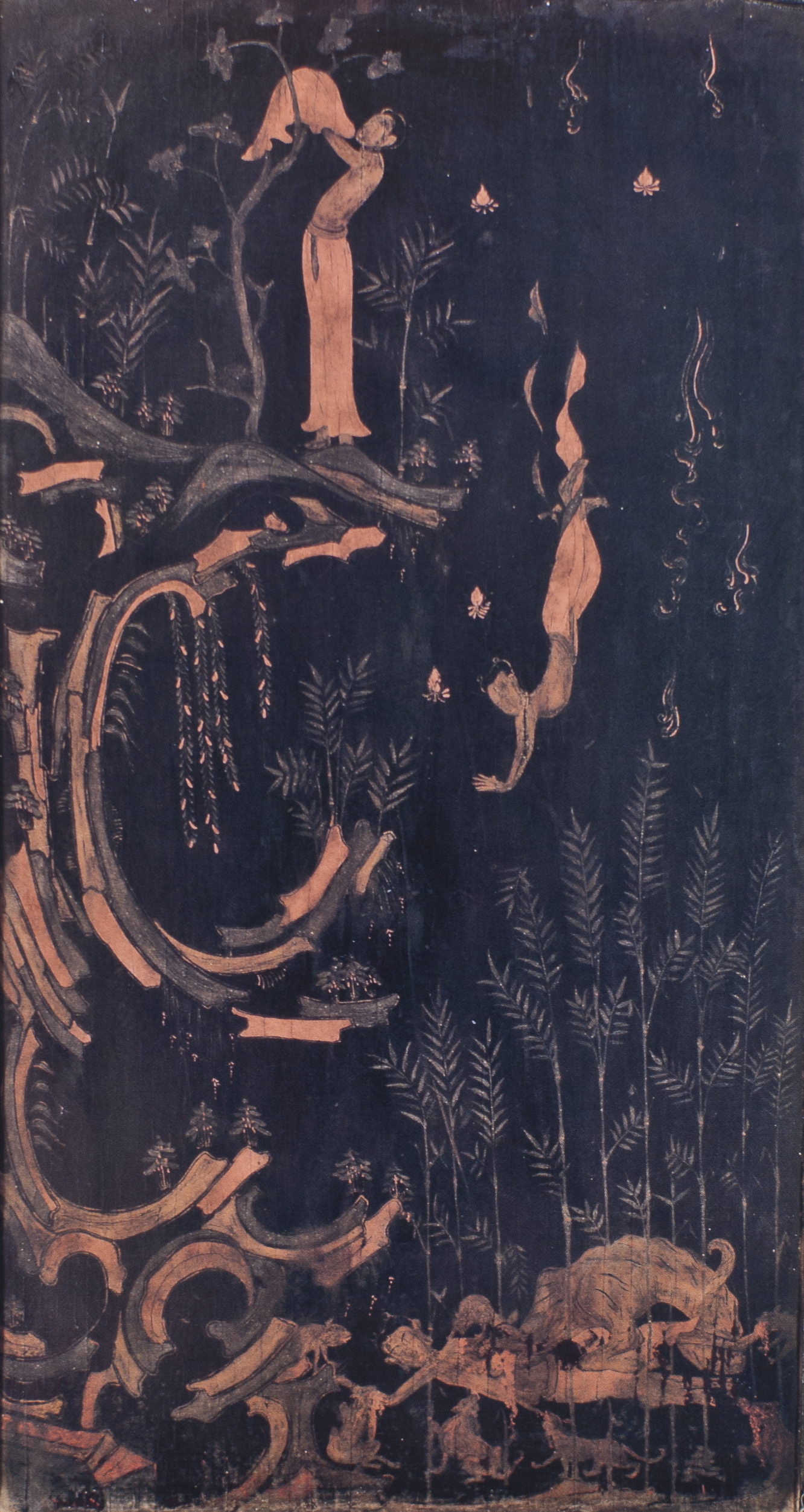
The scene of prince Sattva sacrificing himself – Tamamushi Shrine, 7th century Nara period, Japan

Prince Sattva was one of the previous incarnations of Gautama Buddha, according to a jataka story.

== Ascetic life ==
The son of King Maharatha, he became an ascetic and gained a few disciples.

== Dilemma ==
On his walk with his closest disciple, he comes to the edge of a cliff, at the bottom of which is a starving tigress about to eat her newborn cubs in desperation. The bodhisattva tells his disciple to go look for food and he will stay and try to figure out a way to save her and her young. While his disciple is gone, the bodhisattva reflects that while his disciple very well may not find food, his body is just so much flesh as the tradition states, and by giving it up, he can save the tigress' purity and her cubs' lives. He leaps off the cliff to his death, attracting the tigress' attention with his impact, and she eats his body.

== Achievement and legacy ==
In this way, he comes closer to perfecting some of the ten Buddhist perfections: those of generosity, renunciation, morality, resolution and equanimity. His disciple returns, having not found food, and upon discovering what the bodhisattva has done, rejoices in his good deed. He comes back with other disciples and they and the heavens shower the spot with lotus flowers.

== Stupa ==
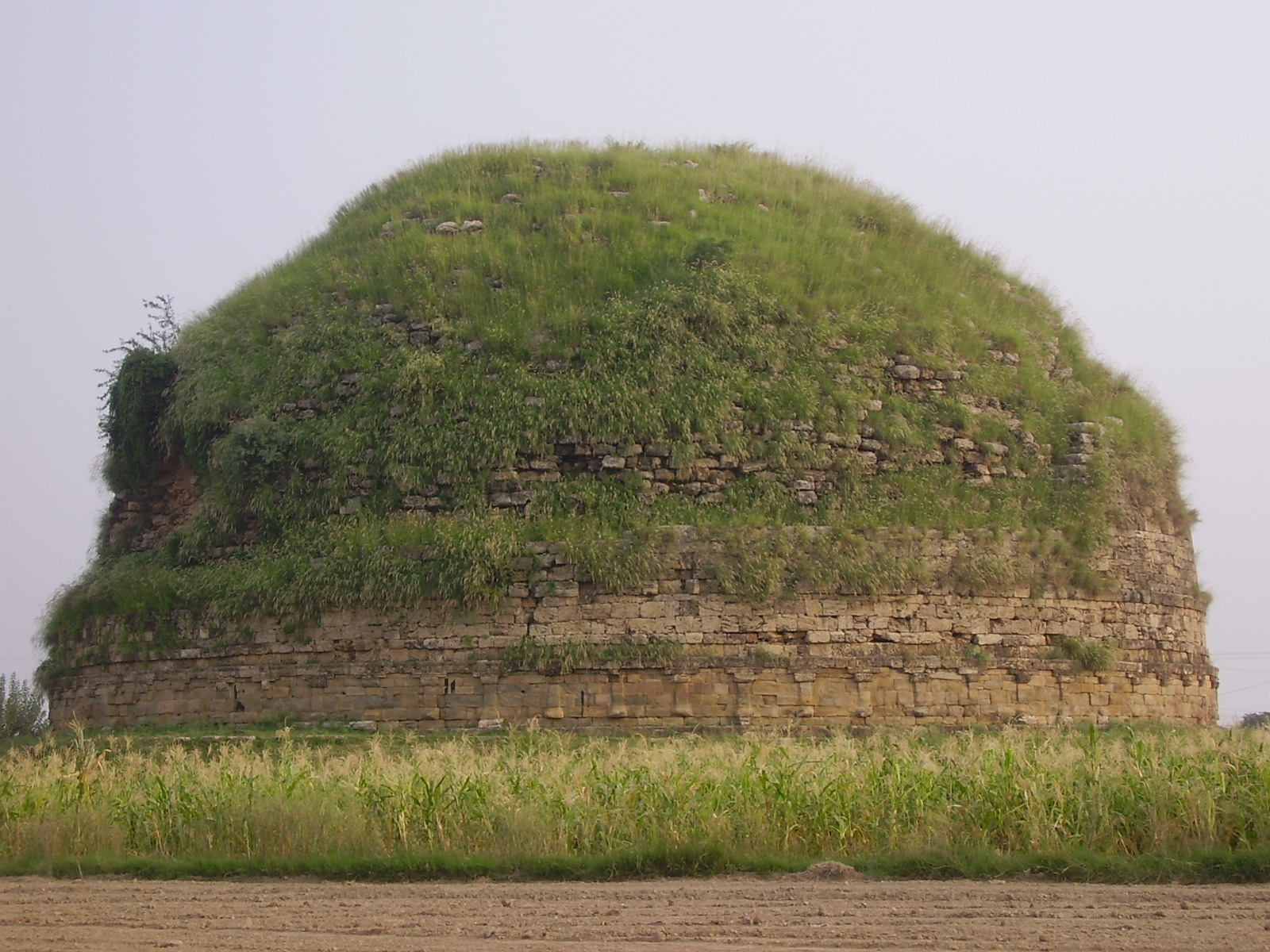
The Mankiala stupa in northern Pakistan marks the spot where, according to the Jataka, Prince Sattva sacrificed himself to feed tigers.

The Chinese pilgrim Faxian reported one of the four great stupas of northern India that commemorates this incarnation's dehadana. This dehadana is known as "gift of the body" in Indian Buddhist narrative literature.
