= Sihala railway station =

Railway station in Pakistan

Sihala Railway Station سہالہ ریلوے اسٹیشن
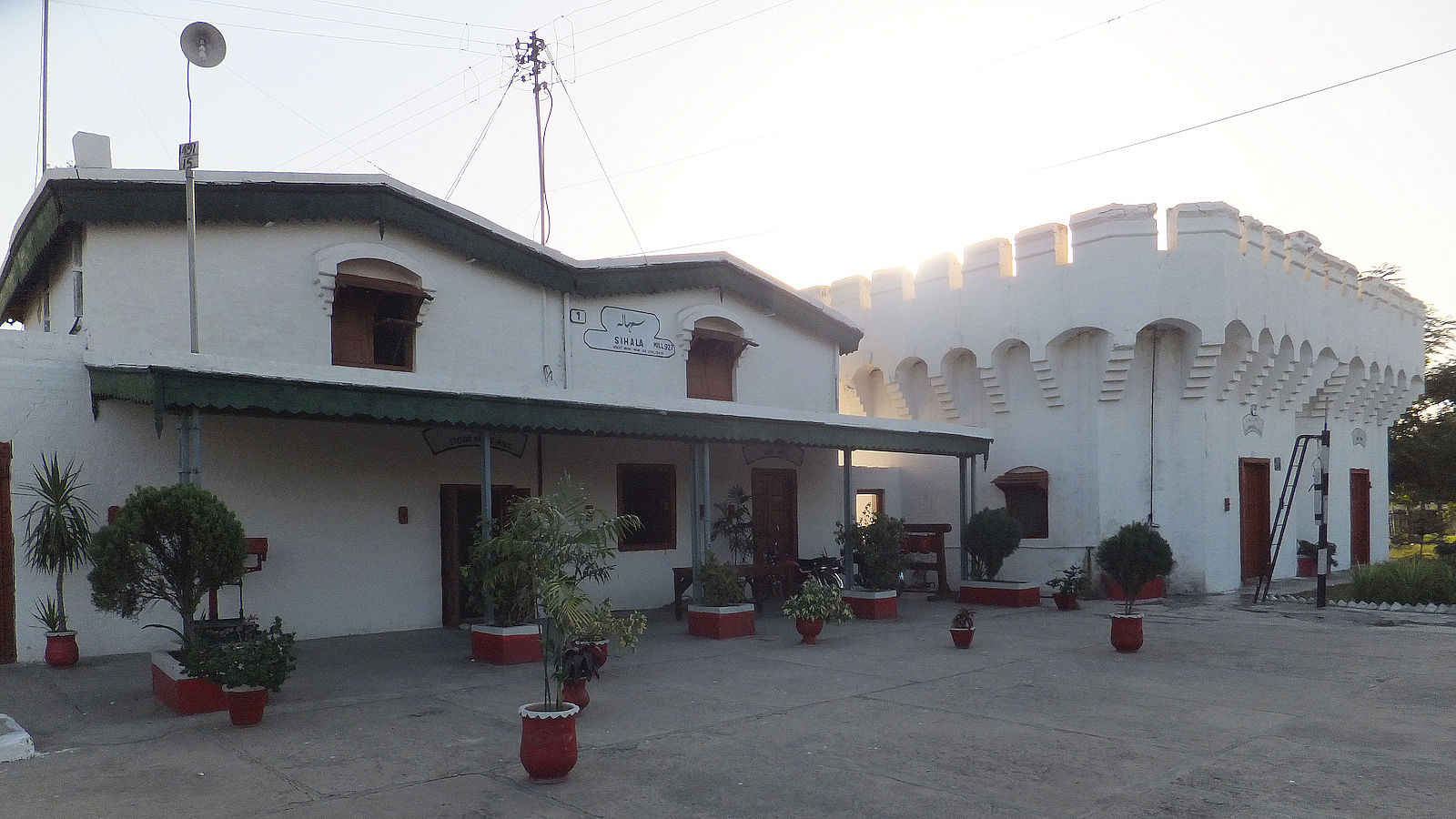
- Sihala railway station, view from platform 1

General information
- Coordinates: 33.5500°N 73.2047°E
- Owner: Ministry of Railways
- Line: Karachi–Peshawar Railway Line
- Platforms: 2
- Tracks: 3

Construction
- Platform levels: 1
- Parking: No

Other information
- Station code: SIH

Services
Preceding station	Pakistan Railways	Following station
Mankiala towards Kiamari	Karachi–Peshawar Line	Chaklala towards Peshawar Cantonment
Location

Sihala Railway Station (Urdu and Punjabi: سہالہ ریلوے اسٹیشن) is located in Sihala town, Islamabad Pakistan.

In January 2025, the projects the government submitted for the consideration /approval of the Executive Committee of the National Economic Council (ECNEC) included a 4-lane bridge Over Sihala Railway Pass.

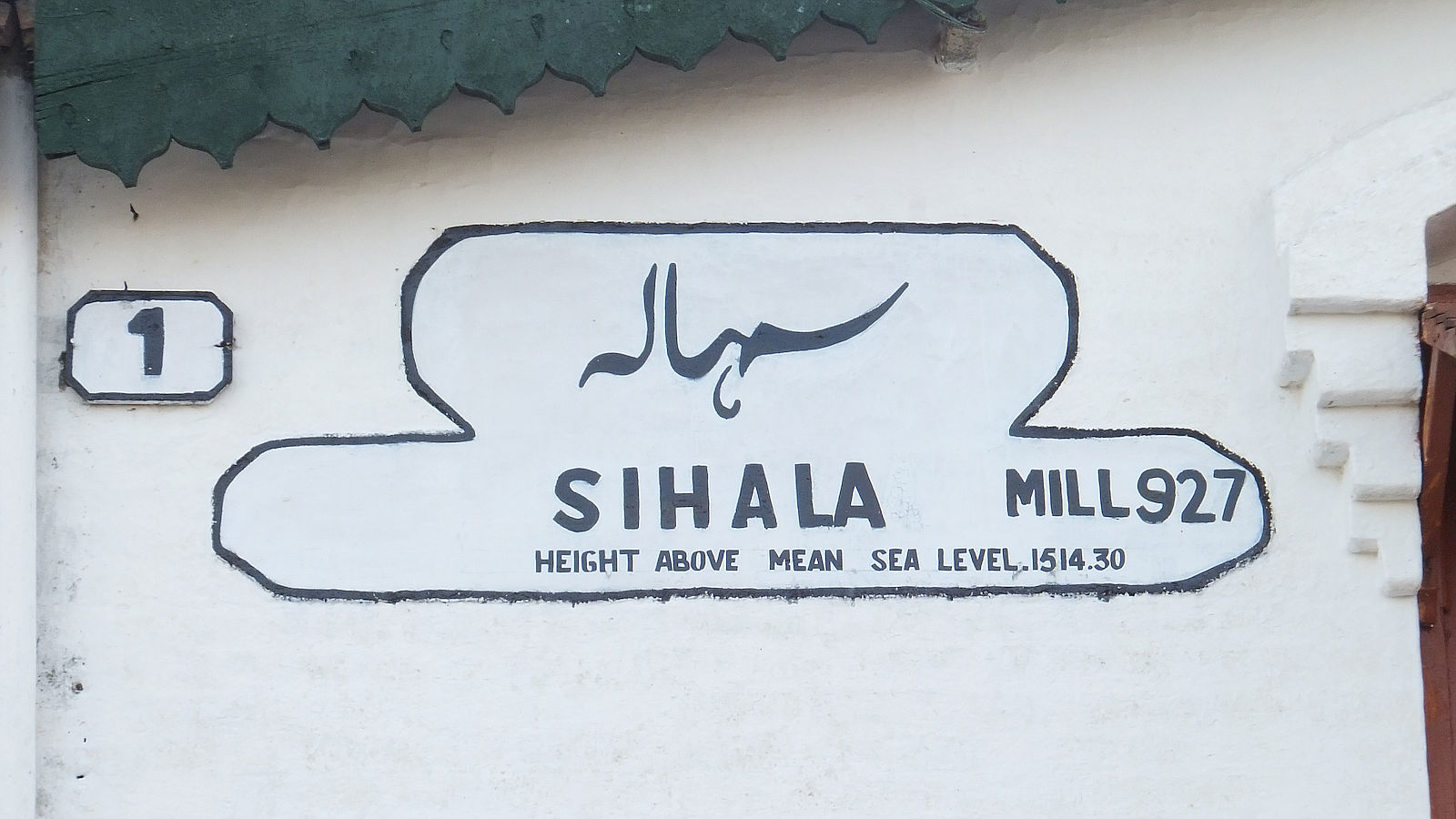
Sihala railway station tag on platform 1

== See also ==
- List of railway stations in Pakistan
- Pakistan Railways
