= Mankhiyai =

- village
- Location within Madhya Pradesh Location within India
- Coordinates: 23.642552°N 77.482729°E
- Country: India
- State: Madhya Pradesh
- District: Bhopal
- Tehsil: Berasia

Population (2011)
  - Total: 921
- Time zone: UTC+5:30 (IST)
- ISO 3166 code: IN-MP
- Census code: 482202

Mankhiyai is a village in the Bhopal district of Madhya Pradesh, India. It is located in the Berasia tehsil.

== Demographics ==
According to the 2011 census of India, Mankhiyai has 167 households. The effective literacy rate (i.e. the literacy rate of population excluding children aged 6 and below) is 75.78%.

Demographics (2011 Census)
	Total	Male	Female
Population	921	482	439
Children aged below 6 years	149	74	75
Scheduled caste	219	120	99
Scheduled tribe	0	0	0
Literates	585	340	245
Workers (all)	261	217	44
Main workers (total)	196	184	12
Main workers: Cultivators	125	124	1
Main workers: Agricultural labourers	48	44	4
Main workers: Household industry workers	0	0	0
Main workers: Other	23	16	7
Marginal workers (total)	65	33	32
Marginal workers: Cultivators	1	1	0
Marginal workers: Agricultural labourers	63	31	32
Marginal workers: Household industry workers	0	0	0
Marginal workers: Others	1	1	0
Non-workers	660	265	395
