= Kaliam Awan railway station =

Railway station in Punjab, Pakistan

Kaliam Awan Railway Station کلیام اعوان ریلوے اسٹیشن
- Kaliam Awan کلیام اعوان

General information
- Owner: Ministry of Railways
- Line: Karachi–Peshawar Railway Line

Other information
- Station code: KWA

Services
Preceding station	Pakistan Railways	Following station
Mandra Junction towards Kiamari	Karachi–Peshawar Line	Mankiala towards Peshawar Cantonment
Location

Kaliam Awan Railway Station (Urdu and Punjabi: کلیام اعوان ریلوے اسٹیشن) is an abandoned railway station located in Kaliam Awan village, Rawalpindi district of Punjab, Pakistan.

== See also ==
- List of railway stations in Pakistan
- Pakistan Railways

== Gallery ==
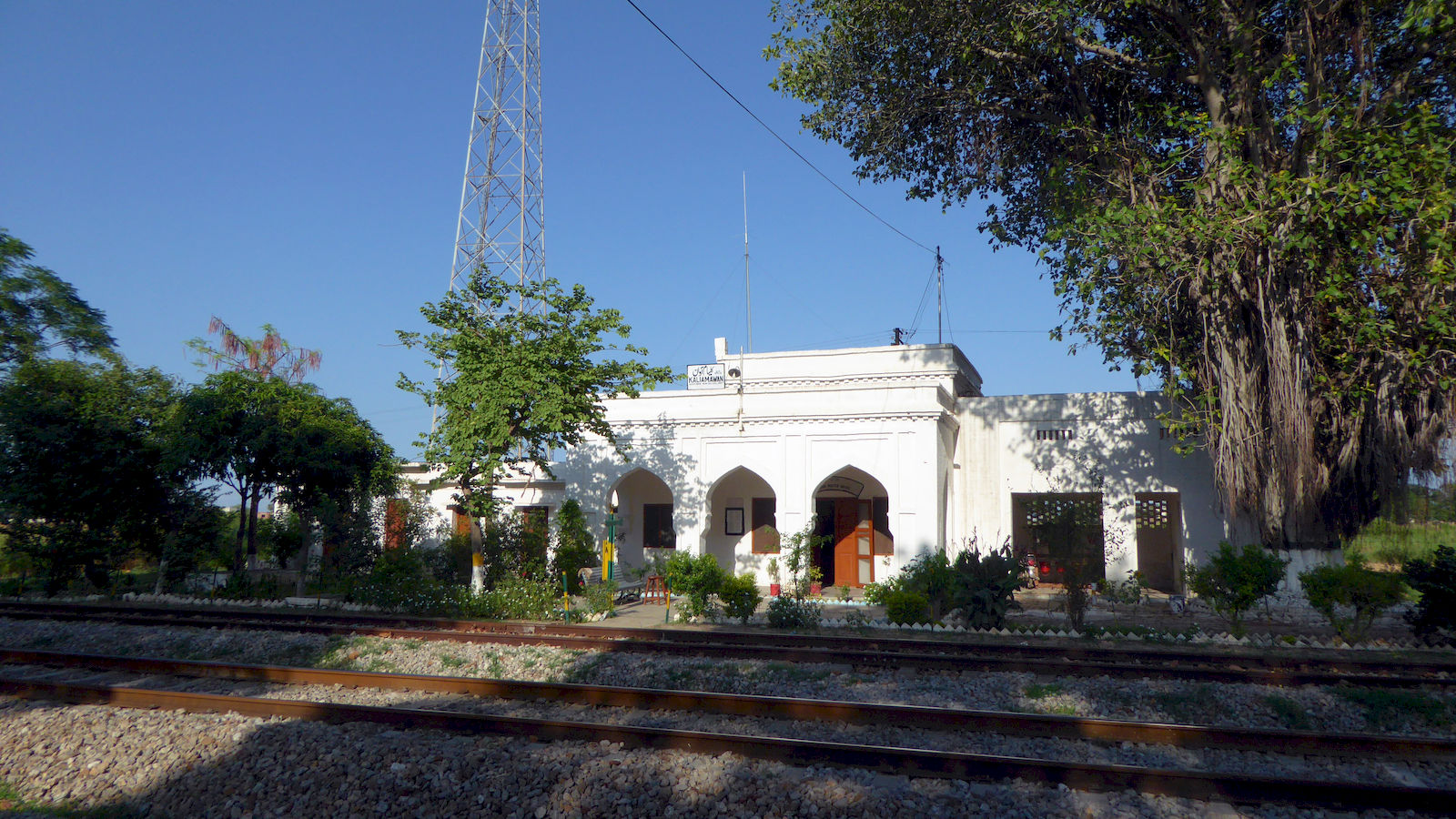
Kaliam Awan railway station, view from across the tracks

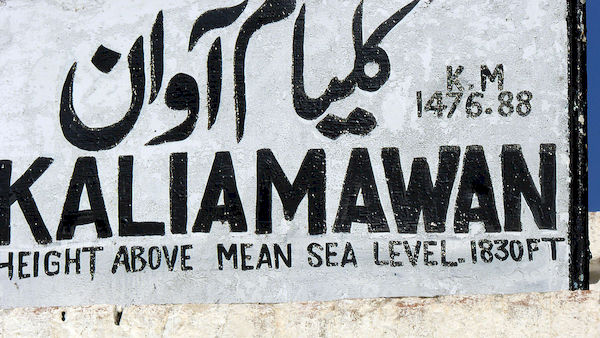
Kaliam Awan railway station tag
