= Mankiala railway station =

Railway station in Punjab, Pakistan

Mankiala Railway Station مانکیالہ ریلوے اسٹیشن
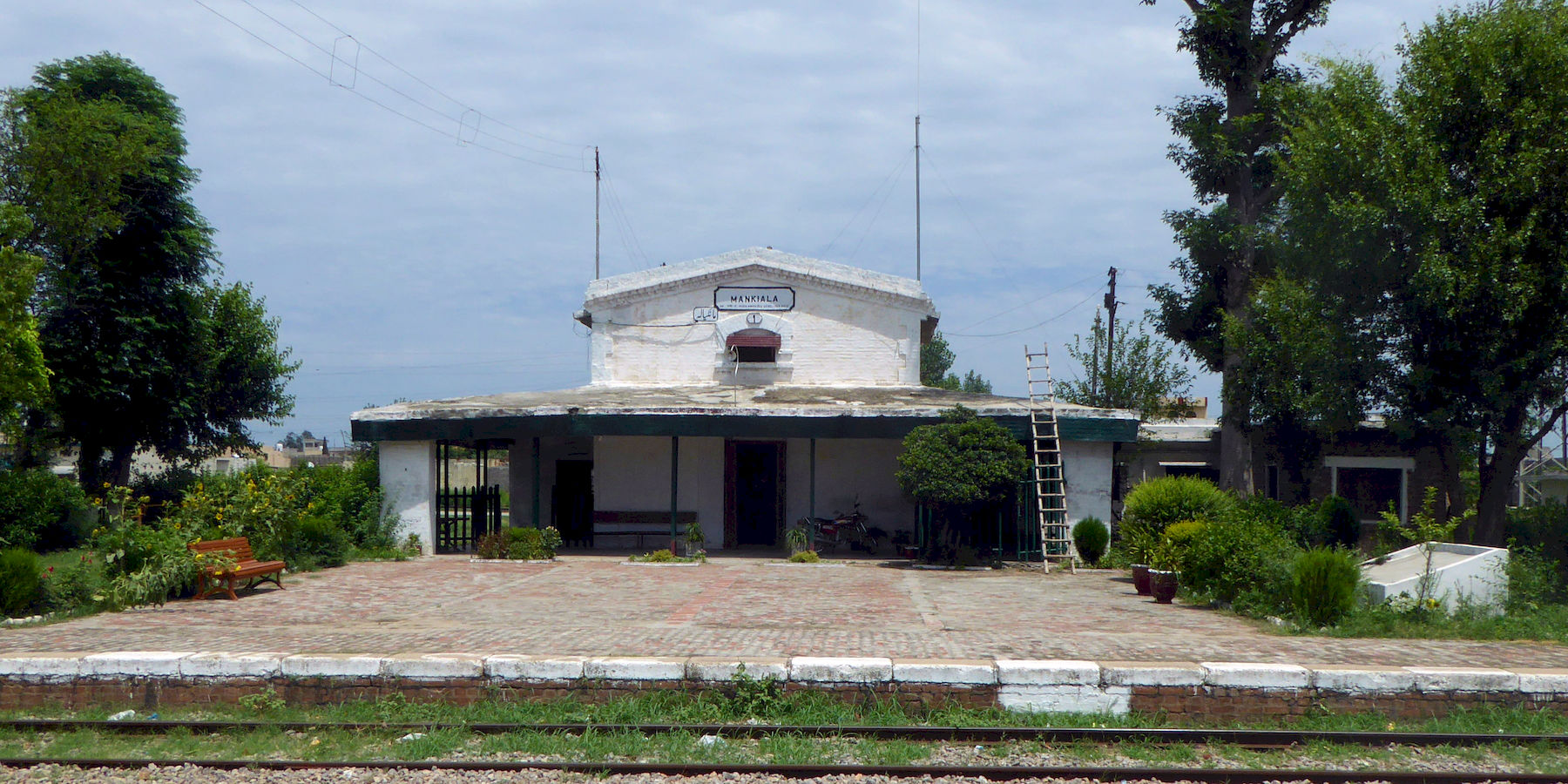

General information
- Coordinates: 33°28′39″N 73°14′25″E
- Owner: Ministry of Railways
- Line: Karachi–Peshawar Railway Line

Other information
- Station code: MKE

Services
Preceding station	Pakistan Railways	Following station
Kaliamawan towards Kiamari	Karachi–Peshawar Line	Sihala towards Peshawar Cantonment
Location

Mankiala Railway Station (Urdu and Punjabi: مانکیالہ ریلوے اسٹیشن) is an abandoned railway station located in Mankiala village near Dhakala village, Rawalpindi district of Punjab province of the Pakistan.

== See also ==
- List of railway stations in Pakistan
- Pakistan Railways

== Gallery ==
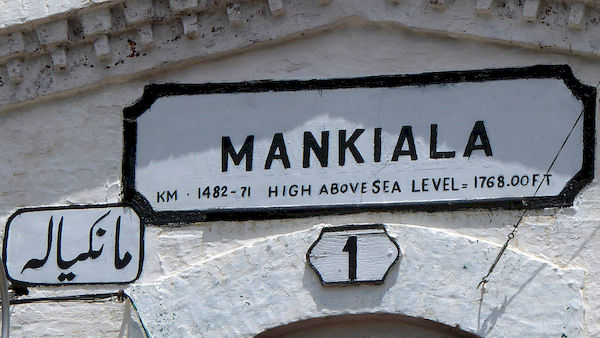
Mankiala railway station tag
