= Kingdom of Kashmir (1754–1762) =

Short-lived Kashmiri state

Kingdom of Kashmir مَملِکَتِ کٔشیٖر (Kashmiri) مملکت کشمیر (Persian)
- 1754 – 1762
- Motto: در جنون عشق او، آن انسان به دست خواهد آورد که تنها کالایش دیوانگی است و چیزی فراتر از آن (Persian) (lit. In the frenzy of His love, that man shall gain; whose only commodity is frenzy and nothing beyond)
- Kashmir in the map of northern India drawn by Rigobert Bonne in 1770 for issue as plate no. A 26 in Jean Lattre's 1776 issue of the Atlas Moderne.
- Status: Break-away de facto state
- Capital and largest city: Srinagar
- Common languages: Kashmiri and Persian (official); Dardic, Arabic, Sanskrit, Punjabi, Dogri, Pahari
- Religion: ~85% Islam; ~15% Hinduism
- Demonym: Kashmiri
- Government: 1754–1758: Unitary authoritarian absolute monarchy; 1758–1762: Unitary radical oligarchical monarchy
- Raja
  - 1754 – 1762: Sukh Jiwan Mal
- Prime Minister
  - 1754 – 1757, 1758: Abu'l Hasan Bandey
  - 1757 – 1758: Mir Muqim Kanth
  - 1758 – 1762: Pandit Mahanand Dhar
- Legislature: Durbar
- Historical era: Durrani Invasions
  - Secession: early–June 1754
  - Third Battle of Panipat: 14 January 1761
  - Formal abdication: mid–October 1762

Area
- 1760: 222,236 km^{2} (85,806 sq mi)

Population
  - 1760: 1,400,000 (estimate)
- Currency: Rupee, Taka
- ISO 3166 code: IN-JK
Preceded by	Succeeded by
Durrani Empire	Durrani Empire; Sikh Confederacy
- Today part of: India ∟ Jammu and Kashmir; Pakistan ∟ Azad Jammu and Kashmir

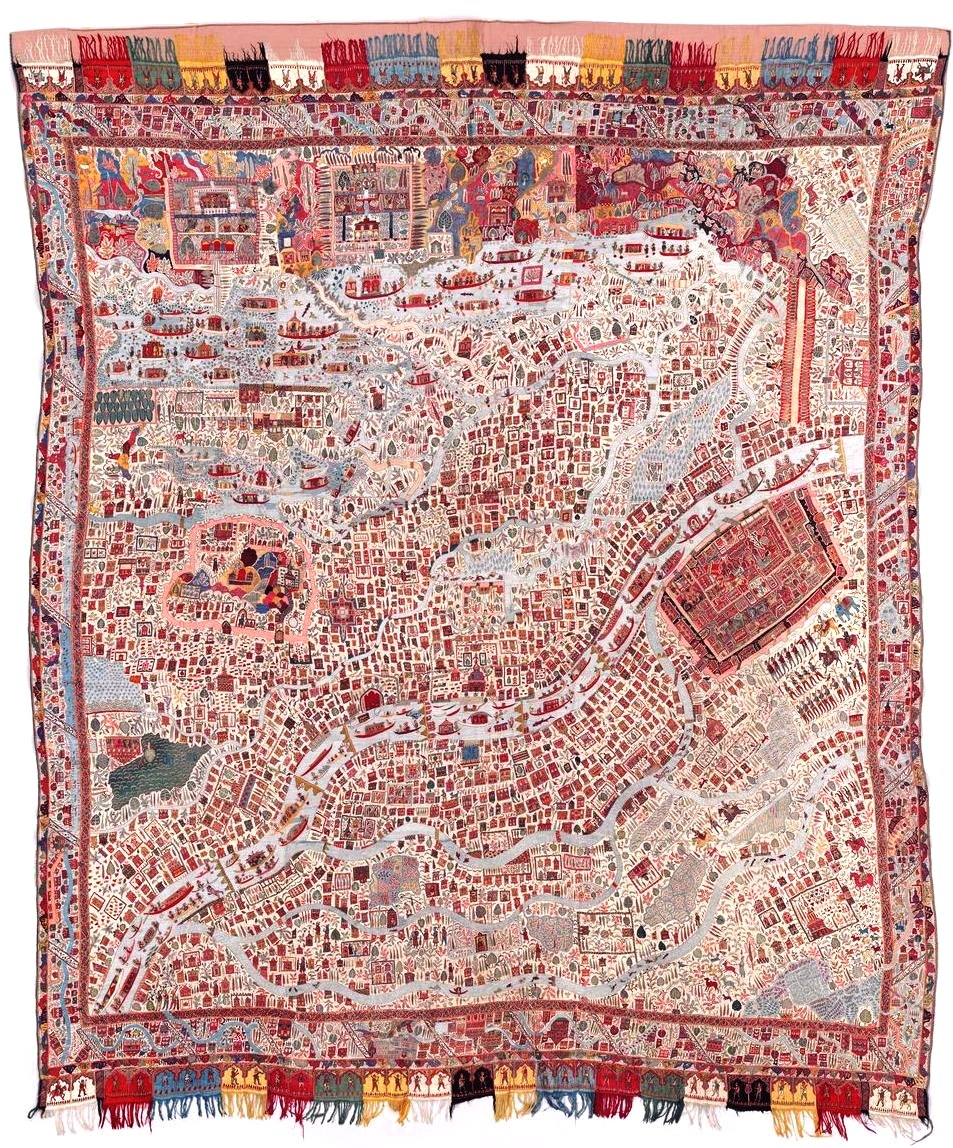
Map shawl of Srinagar made for Queen Victoria, c. 1870, Victoria and Albert Museum

The Kingdom of Kashmir made a brief and ultimately unsuccessful attempt to regain its independence. Since 1586, Kashmir had been a part of the Mughal Empire and was run by a viceroy appointed by the monarch. Due to the social unrest after the capture of Kashmir by the Durranis in the Mughal–Afghan War, Sukh Jiwan Mal, the Durrani governor, was unanimously elected as the king in 1754.

Many Kashmiris, motivated by a growing sense of identity and shared cultural heritage (Kashmiriyat), harboured resentment towards the Durranis, who had repeatedly plundered the region and left it in a state of devastation. The rebels under Abu'l Hasan Bandey, a Kashmiri Muslim noble and a revenue officer, declared his and the populace's distrust of the Durranis and demanded Sukh Jiwan to refuse the payment of revenue and tribute. Sukh Jiwan ousted Khwaja Kijak, the deputy governor, and announced the secession of Kashmir from the Durrani Empire.

Despite the rivalry between the Maratha Empire and the Durrani Empire, Sukh Jiwan's newly formed state recognized the suzerainty of the weakened Mughal Empire. In acknowledgement of his authority, Emperor Alamgir II bestowed upon him the title of Raja (King). The Durranis, on the orders of Ahmad Shah Durrani, waged war against the Kashmiris, and despite numerous setbacks and failures, were able to emerge victorious in the Battle of Chera Har. Kashmir, as a result, was incorporated into the Afghan Empire while Sukh Jiwan was executed.

== Geography ==
Map shawl of the city of Srinagar, Kashmir (Date unknown probably 17th–18th century)

To the north of the kingdom was the Maqpon Kingdom of Baltistan, to the west was the Gakhar Kingdom of Pothohar, to the east was the Namgyal Kingdom of Ladakh, and to the south was the Dogra Kingdom of Jammu and the Lahore Subah.

== Prior to 1754 – Afghan intrusion ==
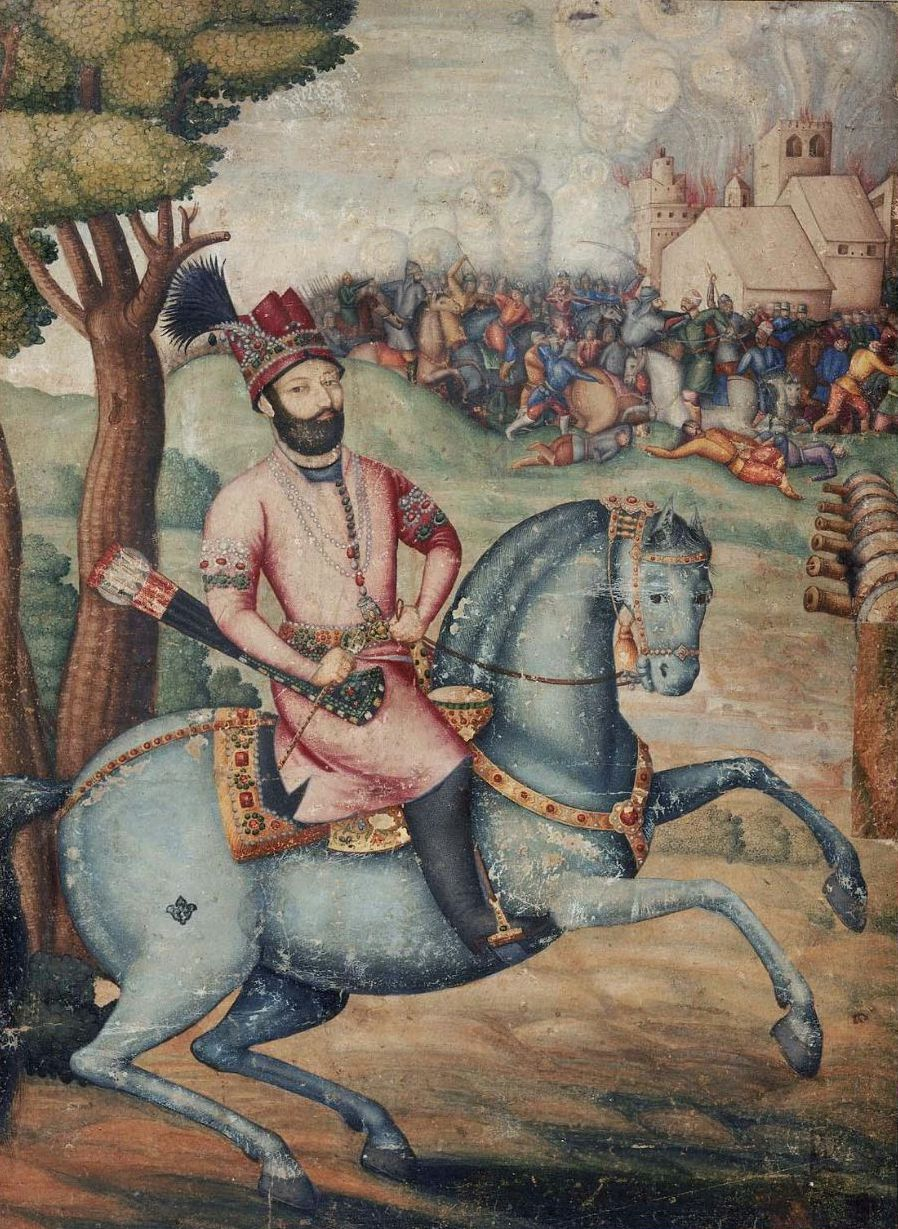
Nader Shah Afshar at the sack of Delhi

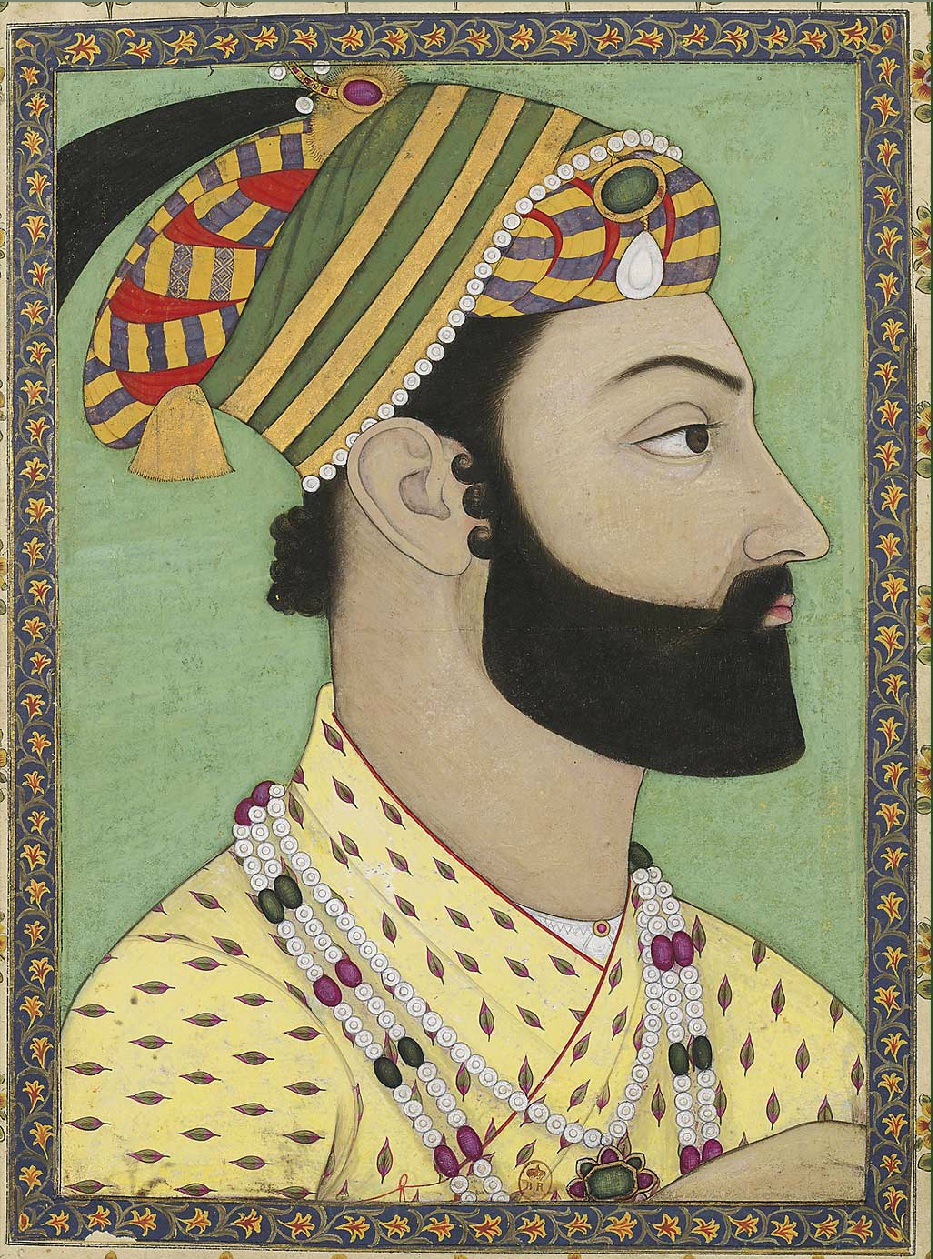
Ahmad Shah Durrani conquered the Kashmir valley twice. First in 1752 and then again in 1762

After the invasion of India by Nader Shah in 1739, many of the frontier provinces of the Mughal Empire, including Kashmir, exerted autonomy. In the Battles of Lahore in 1748 and 1752, Lahore was captured by the Durrani forces of Ahmad Shah Durrani, which further weakened the position of the Mughals. In 1748, Ahmad Shah sent an army of Afghans under his general Asmatullah Khan to conquer Kashmir. Asmatullah succeeded in reaching Srinagar but was killed by the Subahdar of Kashmir, Afrasiyab Khan and his army was scattered and annihilated. The last Subahdar of Kashmir Abu'l Qasim Khan was notorious for his malicious activities against the locals. In 1751, a group of Kashmiri nobles including former deputy governor, Mir Muqim Kanth and Khwaja Zahir went to Ahmad Shah in Lahore requesting him for assistance to overcome Abu'l Qasim Khan. Ahmad Shah, at once, despatched Abdullah Khan Ishaq Aqasi, Abdullah Khan Kabuli, and a Khatri officer and advisor, Sukh Jiwan Mal. Aqasi was successful in defeating Abu'l Qasim Khan in the Battle of Shopian, and Kashmir was annexed into the Durrani Empire either in October 1751 or May 1752.

Utmost horror was experienced in Kashmir as the Durranis under Aqasi plundered it for the next six months. Finally, in October 1752, Aqasi left Kashmir with the loot and appointed Kabuli and Mal as the governor and deputy governor, respectively. The Kashmiri masses were highly annoyed by the Afghans and rose into rebellion under the leadership of Khwaja Abu'l Hasan Khan Bandey, who requested Sukh Jiwan Mal to usurp the governor through a coup. In the summer of 1753, Sukh Jiwan, with the help of the rebels, assassinated Kabuli, while the Afghan army was expelled from Srinagar. Sukh Jiwan immediately appointed Bandey as his chief minister, advisor and finance minister.

These turn of events didn't sit well with Ahmad Shah, but he decided to let Sukh Jiwan rule on his behalf due to his busy schedule and restrained relations with the Zands, Mughals and other contemporary kingdoms. The only step Ahmad Shah took was to take Sukh Jiwan in his confidence as a governor and appoint Khwaja Kijak Khan as his deputy.

== Rebellion, local demands and the assertion of independence ==
At the onset of the year 1754, Ahmad Shah demanded a tribute of several crore rupees. This sum was to be collected from the Kashmiris by any measure fair or foul. Sukh Jiwan was about to issue the orders when the Kashmiris stood up in revolt once again. The local demands put up by Bandey on behalf of the Kashmiris were;

- Not a single rupee should go to the treasury of Ahmad Shah, thus rebuking his orders.
- Khwaja Kijak and his aides: Malik Hassan Khan Irani, Azam Khan, and Mira Khan should be ousted from their respective posts.
- Kashmir should formally secede from the Durrani Empire.

Sukh Jiwan, who was naturally on the side of the Kashmiris, acceded to the demands and asserted independence in the first half of June 1754. Khwaja Kijak, along with a force of 2,000, met the Kashmiri army in Baramulla. Sheer enthusiasm and passion for independence led the Kashmiris defeat Kijak and his forces. According to historian R. K. Parmu, Kijak's three aides were killed in this battle while Kijak himself fled the battlefield. Asking for recognition and allegiance, Sukh Jiwan sent a delegation to Delhi to Emperor Alamgir II and was received by Imad-ul-Mulk. Both the parties came to terms, and Sukh Jiwan was granted the title of Raja (King) while having the Khutbah read and coins struck in the name of the Emperor. On the other hand, Bandey was appointed as the prime minister of Kashmir.

Ahmad Shah, enraged by the latest changes, deputed Abdullah Khan Ishaq Aqasi once again to capture Kashmir. Aqasi was accompanied by a force of 30,000, the majority of which were trained elites from Kabul and entered Kashmir in the mid-winter of 1754. Harsh climate and hatred among the Kashmiris for the Afghans proved disastrous for Ahmad Shah as Afghans faced another defeat in the Battle of Poonch. The defence forces of Sukh Jiwan, though outnumbered and not well equipped, expelled the Afghan army. The majority of the army was annihilated, and the ones who surrendered were taken prisoners and sent to Srinagar whilst seated on donkeys. According to Hasan and Fauq, the prisoners were presented in the city in humiliating costumes, covered by paper caps to be jeered upon by the triumphant Kashmiris.

After dismissing the incursions, both Sukh Jiwan and Bandey worked for the prosperity of the state, adopting certain measures for the betterment of security and safety. Disloyal Maliks (Lords) and Naiks (Guards) were removed from their posts, and their Jagirs were confiscated. These posts were filled with different elites and nobles who stayed loyal to the state. Traitorous soldiers from the Khakha, Bomba, and Gujjar tribes were disbanded and replaced with servicemen from the Sikh and Sansi people.

== Famine ==
By next year, an untimely snowfall destroyed much of the crops. This was followed by a storm of locusts that restricted the annual harvest. The bread scarcity and shortage of yield totally paralysed Kashmir. Bandey was alarmed by the current situation and took immediate steps to relieve the people. Two lakh Kharwars (16,120,000 kgs) of grain were distributed among the people as taccawi (farmer) loans. He took a house-to-house census of the city population, and rations according to the needs were supplied to each family for the next six months. These loans were never recovered either by Sukh Jiwan or Bandey but were finally written off by Col. Mihan Singh Kumedan in 1834.

== Mushairas and literature ==
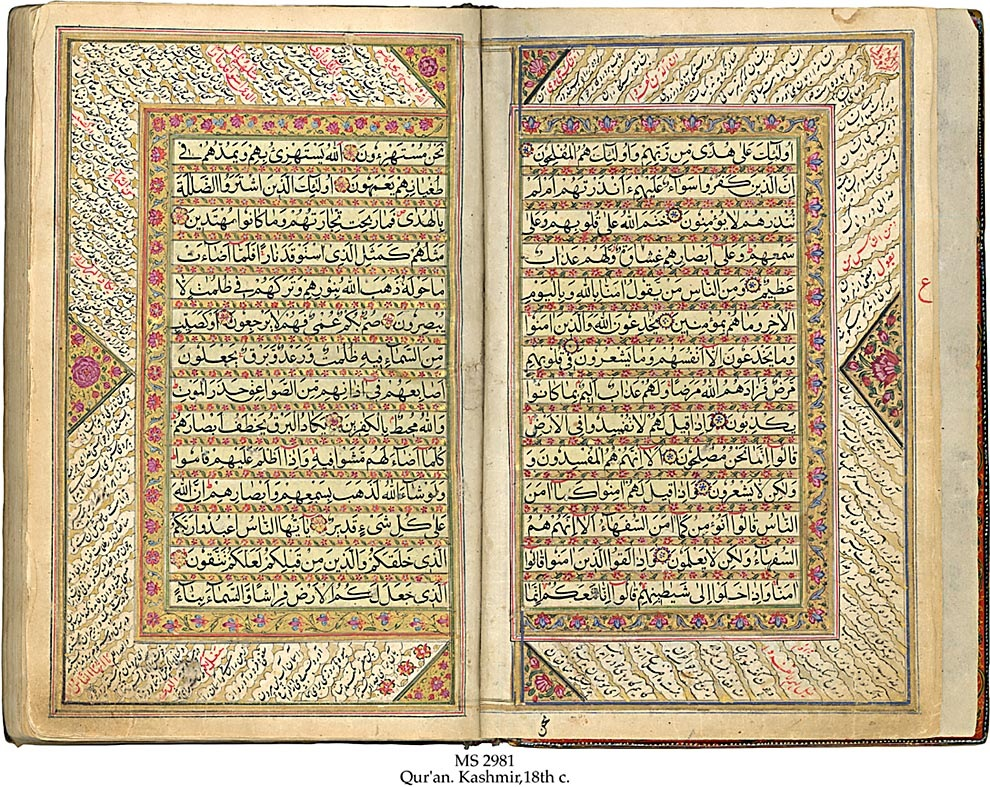
Quranic manuscript in Arabic on polished paper, Kashmir, 18th century

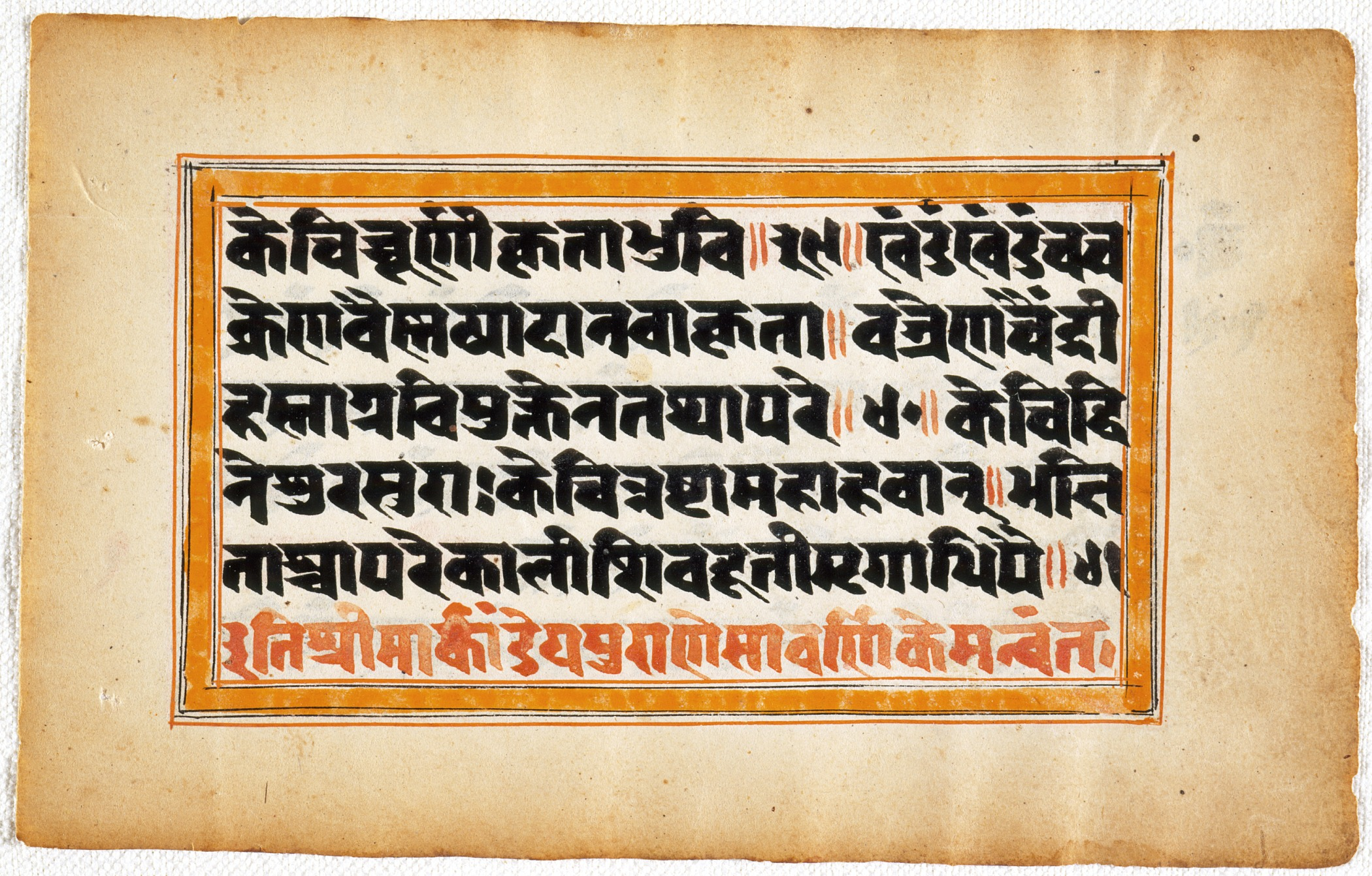
Page of Text, Folio from a Bhagavata Purana (Ancient Stories of the Lord), Kashmir, late 18th century

Mushairas at the residence of the King were held on a regular basis. These used to include the scholars, and poets of different backgrounds. Live dialogues were held between Sukh Jiwan and the ulemas on the topics of religion and philosophy.

The greatest achievement of Sukh Jiwan in the genre of literature was the creation of the Shahnama-e-Kashmir, a book which had the history of Kashmir from the earliest times till his reign and was influenced by the Shahnameh of Ferdowsi. It was headed by seven of the most famous poets of that time. The poets were Mohammad Ali Khan Mateen, Abdul Wahab Shaiq, Mohammad Jani Beg Sami, Mulla Muhammad Taufiq, Rehmatullah, Navid and Hassan with Mulla Taufiq as the lead poet. Each of these poets was assisted by ten other poets. The book had a total of 60,000 couplets, and Sukh Jiwan awarded one rupee for each couplet. Thus, Mulla Taufiq wrote 2,000, Shaiq 6,000, and Sami 1,000 couplets.

Mulla Hamidullah had also written a Kashmiri short drama based on the dialogues between Sukh Jiwan and his wife. The author of the book Khizana-e-Amira, Ghulam Ali Azad Bilgrami, writes about Sukh Jiwan;

He was a handsome youth, possessed of good qualities and inclined towards Islam. After finishing court businesses, he fed two hundred Muslims with a variety of food everyday. On the 11th and 12th of every month, he got sacramental food cooked and distributed among the people. He bestowed favours on every visitor to the court whether he was poor or not. Once in every week he held a poetical conversazione. It was attended by all the well-known poets. At the end of it he gave a dinner. He engaged five (seven?) of the best scholars to complete a history of Kashmir from the earliest habitation to his own time. Each writer was provided with ten assistants. The head of these historians was Muhammad Taufiq with Taufiq as his nom de plume, and was known as Lalaju in Kashmiri. He is a poet unrivalled in Kashmir today.

Before his death, Sukh Jiwan used to sing this ghazal to himself:

It is better to close one's eyes to the conditions of life;
It is better utterly to ignore the state of the world.
For everyone who, like me, has held place on the crown of the rose
For better in the end roles in blood and dust.
For a few days I myself saw that, in this garden
The prophetic blooms were better left unplucked.
Should you feed milk to the world, it stings you with poison;
It is better to live in fear of this black snake.
Should they return to me my world-perceiving eye,
I would rather be a begger from door to door.

And this ruba'i:

Much did I admonish this mean self
not to induldge in this prohibited act.
But my rebellious self refused to listen,
and ultimately saw the unbearable vision.

== International reaction and recognition ==
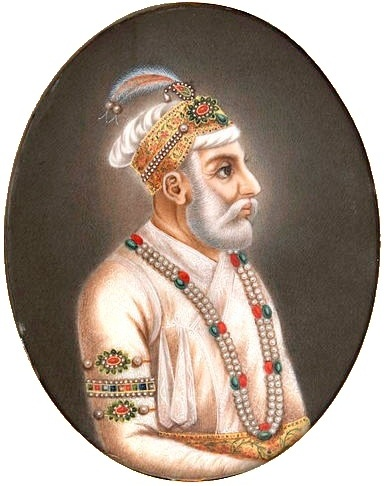
Emperor Alamgir II gave Sukh Jiwan Mal the title of Raja (King)

In the 1750s, the Durranis were in a violent confrontation with their neighbours in the east, i.e., Sikhs, Marathas, and the Mughals and in west against the Zands. These rivalries proved fruitful for the Kashmiris as the Mughal recognition of Kashmir paved the way for further concessions.

The Marathas nonetheless never established formal ties with the kingdom of Kashmir nor did the Sikh misls in Punjab, but both of them expressed support for the rebels to compel Durrani to leave Hindustan. The Dogra kingdom of Jammu under Ranjit Dev and the Gakhar kingdom of Pothohar under Muqarrab Khan due to their extensive support to the Afghans didn't recognize the independence of Kashmir.

In 1757, Ahmad Shah granted Doaba, Jammu and Kashmir to Mughlani Begum as a fief. She sent Khwaja Ibrahim Khan to Kashmir but was taken aback due to the local resistance. An annual deal for tribute was struck between the two parties but the courtiers conspired against Sukh Jiwan. The army of the Khwaja was defeated by Sukh Jiwan and was forced to flee back to Lahore.

The Nawab of Punjab, Adina Beg, in 1758, affirmed his support for Sukh Jiwan. This would have been a major breakthrough for the trade between Srinagar and Lahore but was halted due to the untimely death of Adina. After Adina Beg's death, some courtiers from Kashmir fled to Jammu due to Mahanand Dhar's persecution and were promised assistance by Mughlani Begum, who had by then taken asylum with Ranjit Dev. The Begum's plot was brought to light and was deemed unsuccessful. The Nawab of Sindh, Ghulam Shah Kalhoro, and the Khan of Kalat, Nasir Khan Ahmadzai, due to their dependency on the Durrani Empire stayed silent while the Nawab of Amb, Zabardust Khan Tanoli, openly expressed his opposition to the Kashmiris and was given the title of Suba-e-Kashmir (Suba of Kashmir) by Ahmad Shah.

== Domestic conflict ==
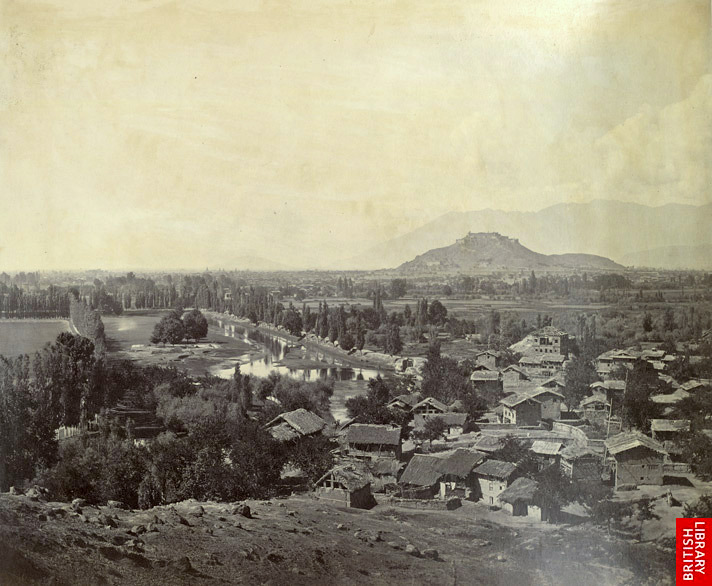
City of Srinagar in the 1860s

The royal army of Kashmir was organized into different units and was trained at barracks situated throughout the valley. The economy escalated, and state affairs were re-established in Srinagar and Anantnag. The rice and saffron fields were well-regulated, and the textile and shawl industry boosted its production. All this was due to the advantageous outcomes of the Kashmiri independence. Ahmad Shah resented these outcomes, and to overcome the passionate Kashmiris, he freed his old enemy Mir Muqim Kanth from prison and sent him to Srinagar as an agent.

Mir Muqim Kanth was an educated individual and was given a job in Srinagar by Sukh Jiwan despite him knowing Kanth's background. Kanth tried to create a rift between Sukh Jiwan and Bandey and was successful in doing so after Bandey was blamed for an assassination attempt against Sukh Jiwan and was also accused for charges of arson after a big fire broke out in Srinagar which took thousands of lives and devastated state arms, ammunition dump and residential houses in 1757. Bandey was imprisoned while his property was forfeited. Kanth succeeded Bandey as the prime minister.

It was only after a year that the hidden activities of Kanth were brought to light. Kanth was imprisoned, and Bandey was reinstated, and his assets were given back to him, but he lost the respect and trust he had put on Sukh Jiwan and vowed to take revenge.

With the internal conflicts "solved," Sukh Jiwan in mid-1758 decided to expand his dominion. On 21 March 1758, the combined forces of Maratha and Sikh under Raghunath Rao and Jassa Singh Ahluwalia took Sirhind from the Afghans. The vulnerable city of Sialkot was left in the hands of Afghan governor Yar Khan. Sukh Jiwan redeemed this opportunity by attacking the cities of Akhnoor, Bhimber, and Sialkot. He left Srinagar with an army of 10,000 and took the fort of Akhnoor from the Jammuites easily. In Bhimber, the Chibs led by Sulaiman Khan gave a tough fight but were defeated. It was in the Battle of Sialkot that Sukh Jiwan faced his first defeat after coming to power as Yar Khan, with the help from Ranjit Dev, defeated and forced him to retreat.

On the other hand, the Bombas of Jhelum revolted and attacked the northern areas of Kashmir. Bandey at once restricted their movement and successfully crushed their leaders. In the absence of Sukh Jiwan, Bandey found the prime time to raise the banner of revolt himself while establishing his army on the right bank of the Jhelum River. Sukh Jiwan went straight for the rebels and defeated them with Bandey fleeing to Poonch. He committed suicide by either self-immolating or self-poisoning himself in the same year after he was surrounded by Sukh Jiwan's men.

Bandey was replaced by a Kashmiri Pandit and an intellectual Pandit Mahanand Dhar from the Dhar family of Srinagar, which has risen to glory in the Kanth–Bandey tussle.

== Religious persecution ==
According to R. K. Parmu, Dhar was a rightist conservative and held extremist views. He changed the secular mindset of Sukh Jiwan and asked him to take anti-Islamic initiatives. The Islamic call to prayer Adhan was banned along with the slaughter of cow. These laws were issued in every city and town of Kashmir, and strict actions were taken against the one who breached the laws. Sukh Jiwan also called Brahmins from Punjab to settle in Kashmir to solidify his position against the agile Muslims. Jia Lal Kilam, the author of A History of Kashmiri Pandits denies the accusations on Dhar's extremist policies but says nothing on the change of laws.

R. K. Parmu, in his book A History of Muslim Rule in Kashmir 1320-1819 writes about Dhar:

The leading Pandit Mahanand Dhar was raised to the rank of the principal noble and prime minister. Under his influence, the raja committed his second blunder. He changed his secular policy, and acting like a bigoted Hindu, banned the azan and the cow-slaughter and thereby offered a direct affront to Muslim sentiments. The Muslim soldiery, in particular, objected and rebelled. But the raja's Sikh and Sansi troops were able to put them down.

After the Muslim uprising, Sukh Jiwan was subjected to another assassination attempt when a prince from Balkh with the help of a Muslim commander, Agha Hussain, and his group entered his house and attacked him with a dagger. Sukh Jiwan was minorly injured while the group, along with both the masterminds, were executed.

== Cessation and aftermath ==
After the Battle of Panipat on 14 January 1761, Ahmad Shah had enough time to divert his attention towards the kingdom of Kashmir. He consulted his close aides and deputed Nur-ud-Din Khan Bamzai, a renowned general and a kinsman of his Wazir, Shah Wali Khan, with a force of 30,000 in June 1762. They were initially repelled as all the passes leading to Kashmir were heavily guarded. The Afghan army returned in October of the same year and this time was further assisted by Ranjit Dev who had sent his son Braj Dev on the insistence of Haji Nawab Khan and Sher Muhammad Khan, the sons of Shah Wali Khan. The combined Afghan-Dogra army then camped at the lower plateau of Tosa Maidan.

Sukh Jiwan and Dhar called all their troops from the frontier districts and gathered them in Srinagar. The amassed troops constituted a total of 50,000 to 60,000.

Both the armies met at Chera Har where a fierce battle broke out between both rival factions. At the outset of the battle, a large part of Sukh Jiwan's army, the majority of which were Muslims deserted under the command of his commander-in-chief, Bakht Mal and joined the enemy. This left a sharp blow on Sukh Jiwan's position as the battle ended shortly in the favour of the Afghans.

Sukh Jiwan and Mahanand Dhar were taken prisoners. While Mahanand Dhar was pardoned, Sukh Jiwan was blinded and sent to Lahore, where he was trampled to death by an elephant, the capital punishment for treason. Bamzai later entered Srinagar and replaced Sukh Jiwan as the governor of Kashmir. Sukh Jiwan ruled for a total of 8 years, 4 months and 8 days. In January 1763, Nur-ud-Din departed from the valley, entrusting its governance to Buland Khan Bamzai.
