= Muqarrab Khan Gakhar =

Sultan of Pothohar

- Nawab; Sultan
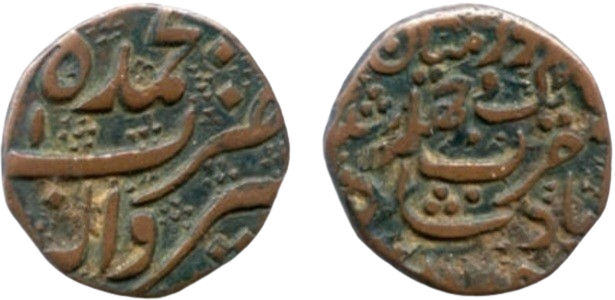
- Falus coin minted in the name of Muqarrab Khan, c. 1755, Sultanpur

Sultan of Pothohar
- Reign: 1739 – 1767
- Predecessor: Mu'azzam Khan Gakhar (Note: As Mansabdar of Kohat, Bannu, and Mianwali and Sardar of Pharwala and Dahan Gali)
- Successor: Position abolished (Note: Himmat Khan assumed the chieftaincy of the tribe, Saadullah Khan and Nadir Ali Khan took Pharwala while Mansur Khan and Shadman Khan took Dahan Gali)

Sardar of Gujrat
- Reign: 1741 – December 1765
- Predecessor: Zakariya Khan Bahadur (Note: As Subahdar of Lahore)
- Successor: Gujjar Singh Bhangi
- Born: Mukarram Khan c. 1705; Pharwala, Pothohar, Lahore Subah, Mughal Empire (modern-day Punjab, Pakistan)
- Died: c. 1767; Domeli, Pothohar, Afghan Empire (modern-day Punjab, Pakistan)
- Burial: Bagh Jogian; 33.6177°N 73.2950°E
- Issue: Saadullah Khan; Nadir Ali Khan; Mansur Ali Khan; Shadman Khan
- House: Admal Decendents of Sultan Adam Khan
- Dynasty: Gakhar
- Father: Mu'azzam Khan
- Mother: Bibi Shukar Bano
- Religion: Sunni Islam (Hanafi)
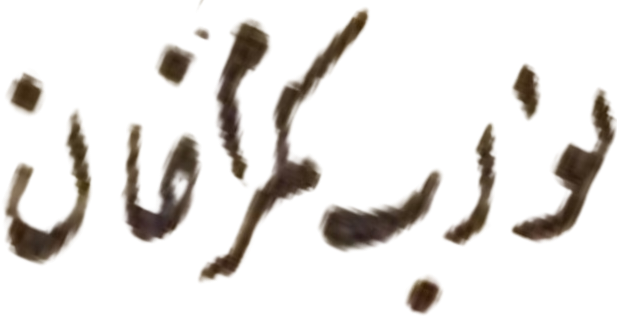
- Signature

Muqarrab Khan Gakhar (Punjabi: مقرب خان گکھڑ) was a Punjabi Muslim general and a tribal chief who rose to power and became the Sultan of Pothohar from 1739 until 1767 succeeding his father Mu'azzam Khan. He also captured the city of Gujrat in 1741 and made it his capital until 1765 when it was conquered by the Sikhs. Muqarrab was succeeded by his sons in the remaining territories of Pharwala and Dahan Gali

== Early life ==
Muqarrab Khan was born as Mukarram Khan in 1705 in Pharwala to Mu'azzam Khan Gakhar the chief of the Gakhar tribe and a noble lady Bibi Shukar Bano. Muqarrab Khan's father, Mu'azzam Khan, and grandfather Dulu Murad Khan were the mansabdar of the cities of Kohat, Bannu, and Mianwali and were appointed by Emperor Aurangzeb himself as the Gakhar chiefs were trusted allies of the Mughal Empire. The jagirs of Pharwala and Dahan Gali were the ancestral lands of the Gakhars since Emperor Babur's reign. Muqarrab, being the eldest of his siblings, was made heir to the Gakhar estate by his father. In December 1738, Nader Shah of Iran crossed the Indus River where Mu'azzam Khan submitted to him. By the following year, Mu'azzam Khan died and was succeeded by Muqarrab Khan.

== Reign ==
The hereditary title of Sultan was passed down to Muqarrab after his ascendancy. Muqarrab Khan was acknowledged by Nader Shah during his invasion of the Mughal Empire.

Mu'azzam Khan's sudden death led to an anarchy in Pothohar. Muqarrab Khan immediately called Diwan Ahmed Khan Gakhar of Mirpur and Mahabat Hayatullah Khan Gakhar of Akbarabad-Takhpari for a Panchayat and a tripartite alliance was made. Jang Quli Khan Khattak, also known as Khojam Quli Khan utilising the dire state of the Gakhars, laid siege to the fortress of Rawalpindi. Muqarrab Khan at once came to the defence of Amir Khan Firuzal of Rawalpindi and defeated and forced Jang Quli Khan out of Rawalpindi. Muqarrab Khan also helped Diwan Ahmed Khan in subduing the Andarhal hills centred around Mirpur from the Chibs led by Asalat Khan Chib of Mauza Punir. Muqarrab then continued his expedition against Malik Khan Mangrial of Saila Kotla, Jammu, a rival of Diwan Ahmed Khan. Malik Khan's forces were routed, and he himself was killed.

After Nader Shah's invasion, the influence of the Mughal Empire in Punjab was practically diminished. Thus, in 1741, Muqarrab Khan took the city of Gujrat and made it his capital. He also built a Baradari in the city and used it as his primary residence. This Baradari was renovated by Ranjit Singh in 1835. After the Fall of Punjab, it was given to the deputy commissioner of Gujrat. Muqarrab Khan was again challenged in Pothohar, but this time by Himmat Khan Gakhar of Domeli, one of his kinsmen. His main objective was to kill Muqarrab's commander-in-chief and was successful in doing so in an ensuing conflict. Muqarrab, in retaliation, pillaged and burned many villages and killed many of the perpetrators while the rest were pardoned through the intervention of Nawazish Ali Khan Gakhar of Khanpur.

An invasion was made by Yusufzai Afghans eying for land and property in the Pothohar plateau. The tripartite alliance came into effect as the Yusufzais were defeated and expelled. Muqarrab Khan then clashed with Chaudhry Mehr Qassar, a Zamindar of Badshahani (a village in Jhelum) for forcibly carrying off some of his men who had found asylum in Muqarrab's dominion. The Chaudhry was ambushed, defeated, and killed.

=== Allegiance to Ahmad Shah Durrani ===
In December 1747, Ahmad Shah Durrani crossed the Indus River and razed the Gakhar town of Mu'azzam Nagar to ground. He also ordered the sacking of the Tilla Jogian Temple complex. This forced the Gakhar chiefs to submit to him, and so did Muqarrab Khan, who was guaranteed his previous holdings in Pharwala, Dahan Gali, and Gujrat. Likewise, the Sindh Sagar Doab and Chaj Doab were allocated to Muqarrab as well in return for Durrani suzerainty.

Around this time, Muqarrab Khan gathered his troops and invaded the Chibhal territory. Sulaiman Khan Chib, the Raja (King) of Chibhal, put up a tough fight but was eventually defeated, and Gakhar forces raided and plundered the country even coming to the suburbs of the capital ‘Bhimber’.

In 1756, Ahmad Shah Durrani crossed the Indus River for his fourth invasion and was joined by Muqarrab Khan's sons Nadir Ali Khan and Saadullah Khan along with a contingent of Gakhar soldiers. Both of his sons were present in the Sack of Delhi and were greatly rewarded for that.

In 1758, the Afghan influence in the region was at its peak, and to challenge their authority, the Marathas and their Peshwa Balaji Baji Rao contacted various local leaders and rulers. Many of them like Sukh Jiwan Mal of Kashmir, Adina Beg Khan of Punjab, Ghulam Shah Kalhoro of Sindh and Nasir Khan I Ahmadzai of Kalat were already fighting against the Afghans. Muqarrab Khan called a Panchayat to discuss the matter, but in the end, decided to remain loyal to Durrani.

In the winters of 1761–1762, Ahmad Shah Durrani invaded India again, but this time his primary focus were the Sikhs. Muqarrab Khan helped Ahmad Shah and gave him the command of his forces. The Sikhs were defeated in the Battle of Kup in 1762, which was followed by the Vadda Ghalughara. Muqarrab Khan was awarded for his actions in this campaign and received a renewed title of Nawab.

=== Invasion of Gujjar Singh Bhangi ===
Gujjar Singh Bhangi, and Lehna Singh Bhangi of the Bhangi Misl and Sobha Singh Kanhaiya of the Kanhaiya Misl took Lahore in 1765 and divided it among themselves. Gujjar Singh was invited by Chaudhry Rehmat Khan Warraich of Jalalpur Jattan to attack Gujrat. Gujjar Singh set out at once from Lahore and capturing a total of 150 villages including Wazirabad, Eminabad and Sodhra reached Gujrat in December 1765 where he was joined by Rehmat Khan. Muqarrab Khan put up a tough fight but lost the battle and sought refuge in the Gujrat Fort, which was besieged afterwards. Muqarrab Khan fled Gujrat towards Rohtas Fort on the back of an elephant while the surrounding area was captured by Gujjar Singh and added to his domain.

Muqarrab Khan losing all power in his traditional stronghold resorted to Rawalpindi and fortified it. In 1767, a Sikh mercenary, Milkha Singh Thehpuria, with assistance from Gujjar Singh Bhangi and Charat Singh Sukerchakia ousted Muqarrab Khan out from Rawalpindi and became the Sardar of the city. Milkha Singh was given the entire governorship of the area between Indus River and Chenab River by Gujjar Singh. He established himself in Rawalpindi and came to be known as Milkha Singh Pindivala (Milkha Singh of Pindi) afterwards. The credibility of the presence of Muqarrab in this battle is often debated by modern historians who believe that it was his sons who lost Rawalpindi to Thehpuria.

== Death ==
The circumstances of Muqarrab Khan's death are debated.

One account holds that he was captured and killed by Gujjar Singh Bhangi after the fall of Gujrat. Another, more widely accepted by historians, suggests that his rival Himmat Khan of Domeli captured him after he had lost most of his power and had him put to death.

The later theory is more favourable among the historians as many reports say that Muqarrab was successful in fleeing Gujrat. His tomb is, however, situated in Bagh Jogian, a town just beside the Pharwala Fort, and a mausoleum has been built over it. He was succeeded by Saadullah Khan and Nadir Ali Khan in Pharwala and Mansur Khan and Shadman Khan in Dahan Gali while the chieftaincy of the tribe was seized by Himmat Khan.
