= Sikh conquest of Rawalpindi (1767) =

- Part of the expansion of the Bhangi Misl in the Pothohar region
Date	Winter 1767
Location	Rawalpindi, between Rohtas and Attock, Pothohar region
Result	Sikh victory
Territorial changes	Rawalpindi, Pothohar, and adjoining tracts brought under the authority of Gujjar Singh Bhangi

Belligerents
Bhangi Misl	Gakhars; Awans; Janjuas; Dhunds; Ghebas

Commanders and leaders
Gujjar Singh Bhangi; Sahib Singh Bhangi; Milkha Singh Thepuria	Sultan Muqarrab Khan of Pharwala (surrendered); Karmullah Khan of Dhani (surrendered); Mansur Khan of Gheb (surrendered)

The Sikh conquest of Rawalpindi (1767) was the occupation of Rawalpindi by forces of Gujjar Singh Bhangi during the winter of 1767. The conquest formed part of a wider expansion into the tract between Rohtas and the Indus River, including the subjugation of local strongholds and the organization of Sikh administration in the region.

== Background ==
The country between the Jhelum and the Indus was arid and broken by ravines. Between Rohtas and Rawalpindi, the principal strongholds were held by the Gakhars at Jhera or Jherar, Jagatpur, Pharwala or Perwala, and Pakoke Sarae. Sultan Mukarram Khan of Pharwala or Perwala, Karmullah Khan of Dhani, and Mansur Khan of Gheb submitted to Gujar Singh during his advance into the region.

The surrounding districts also contained other tribal groups, including the Awans, Dhunds, and Gulers or Guleras. In the Jhelum district, the Awans occupied Awan Kari across the river Gabir. In the Rawalpindi district, Awan strongholds were located at Chilian or Chihan, Jand Bugdial, and Sarwala. A Guler clan lived to the north of Rawalpindi, while the Dhunds inhabited the hilly country between Hazara and Murree, with citadels at Dewal, Kahuta, and Murree.

Before the conquest of Rawalpindi, Gujjar Singh Bhangi extended his authority over Pothohar, including the parganahs of Wangli and Pharwala or Perwala. Wangli comprised eight tappas, with its headquarters at Kalra. By 1767, Gujjar Singh had begun the systematic subjugation of the tribes of the Salt Range and Rawalpindi, and the Gakhars, Janjuas, and Awans yielded before him.

== Conquest and Administration ==
Rawalpindi was a small place at the time, consisting of a few huts associated with Rawal Hindu mendicants. Gujar Singh regarded it as strategically important because it lay at the junction of the routes from Kabul to Lahore and from Kabul to Kashmir.

Gujjar Singh Bhangi, accompanied by his son Sahib Singh, conquered Rawalpindi in the winter of 1767. The occupation formed part of a broader campaign in which the surrounding tribal territories were brought under his control.

After the conquest of Rawalpindi, Gujjar Singh placed Milkha Singh Thepuria in charge of the town. He then advanced to Hasan Abdal, about 46 kilometres from Rawalpindi, and entrusted it to Kala Singh Bhangi, who established his seat at Kali Sarae. Gujar Singh then moved onward to Attock, about 53 kilometres beyond Hasan Abdal, and assigned the intervening country between Hasan Abdal and Attock to Ran Singh Pada or Pidah, a Brahman whose headquarters were also at Kali Sarae.

This arrangement functioned as a shared military command. Kala Singh and Ran Singh were individually responsible for their own jurisdictions and jointly responsible for defence. Milkha Singh's wife supervised them and, in Milkha Singh's absence, commanded Sikh forces in suppressing local rebellions between Rawalpindi and Attock. Milkha Singh exercised authority over the tract from Rohtas to Attock.

Further appointments followed. Sadhu Singh was charged with provisioning the Sikh troops, while Budh Singh supervised the collection of revenue. Tappa Tarali and Qila Rotala were assigned to Chait Singh, a brother of Gujjar Singh. Kalra and Pothohar were entrusted to Jodh Singh Atariwala. Rawalpindi was also granted to Milkha Singh as a jagir, while Narli and the fortress of Rutala were conferred upon Chet Singh. Jodh Singh Attariwala held Kalar as thanedar and Pothohar as tehsildar.

== Significance ==
The conquest of Rawalpindi formed part of the extension of Bhangi authority from Rohtas toward Attock. It marked one stage in Gujjar Singh's campaign to subdue the tribes of the Salt Range and Rawalpindi and to incorporate their territories into his domain.

== Bibliography ==
- Gupta, Hari Ram (1999a). History Of The Sikhs: The Sikh Commonwealth Or Rise And Fall Of Sikh Misls, Vol. IV (3rd illustrated ed.). Munshiram Manoharlal Publishers. ISBN 9788121501651.
- Gupta, Hari Ram (1999b). History of the Sikhs: Evolution of Sikh Confederacies, 1708–1769 (3rd illustrated ed.). Munshiram Manoharlal Publishers. ISBN 978-81-215-0248-1.
- Singh, Dalbir (2010). Rise, Growth And Fall Of Bhangi Misal.
- Siṅgha, Bhagata (1993). A History of the Sikh Misals. Punjab (India): Publication Bureau, Punjabi University.
