= Milkha Singh Thepuria =

Sardar of Rawalpindi
- Reign: 1767 – 1804
- Predecessor: Muqarrab Khan
- Successor: Jiwan Singh
- Born: Kaleke, near Kasur, Lahore Subah, Mughal Empire
- Died: 1804; Rawalpindi, Bhangi Misl, Sikh Confederacy
- Issue: Jiwan Singh
Posthumous name
- Milkha Singh Pindiwala
- Misl: Bhangi
- Religion: Sikhism
- Occupation: Sardar; Misaldar

Milkha Singh Thepuria (died 1804), also known as Milkha Singh Pindiwala (lit. 'Milkha Singh of Pindi'), was a Sikh sardar of the Bhangi Misl who held Rawalpindi and adjoining north-western territories during the later eighteenth century. A native of Kaleke near Kasur, he founded the village of Thepur in Lahore district, from which his epithet derived. After the Bhangi conquest of Rawalpindi in 1767, he was placed in charge of the town by Gujjar Singh Bhangi, made it his headquarters, and extended Sikh authority across parts of Pothohar and the frontier between Rohtas and Attock. He later took part in Sikh resistance to Afghan invasions and remained active during the political realignments that accompanied the rise of Ranjit Singh.

== Early life and background ==
Milkha Singh was a native of Kaleke, near Kasur. He later founded the village of Thepur in Lahore district, from which he acquired the appellation Thepuria or Thehpuria. Before establishing himself in Rawalpindi, he seized villages in the districts of Firozpur, Lahore, Gujranwala and Gujrat.

=== Rise to prominence ===
Milkha Singh emerged as one of the notable Bhangi sardars attached to Gujjar Singh Bhangi. On the north-western side of Bhangi expansion, he formed part of the advanced line of chiefs operating beyond Lahore and Gujrat. After Gujjar Singh captured Rawalpindi in the winter of 1767, he placed Milkha Singh in charge of the town and its surrounding tract.

== Governorship of Rawalpindi ==
When Milkha Singh assumed control, Rawalpindi was little more than a modest settlement. He chose it as his headquarters, overseeing the construction of new houses and the fortification of the town, while extending his authority over the surrounding countryside, which generated an annual revenue of approximately three lakhs of rupees.

Milkha Singh's domain stretched across the tract between Rohtas and Attock, and his position on this frontier formed part of a broader Bhangi defensive arrangement, with nearby commanders holding Hasan Abdal, Kali Sarai, and the plains approaching Attock. His wife, whose name is not recorded in the sources, exercised considerable supervisory authority along this frontier, and in his absence personally commanded Sikh forces in operations against local rebellions.

To manage his administration, Milkha Singh appointed Sadhu Singh to oversee the provisioning of troops with rations and clothing, and Budh Singh to superintend revenue collection. He further extended jagirs to local Gakhar chiefs in exchange for nominal tribute, seeking to consolidate Bhangi rule through a carefully balanced combination of military strength and negotiated accommodation.

Milkha Singh was equally attentive to the town's economic vitality. He actively encouraged commercial growth by inviting traders from Bhera, Chakwal, Miani, and Pind Dadan Khan, granting them land to establish themselves, and providing employment to large numbers of poor Muslims in his building projects. Such was his standing in the region that neighbouring tribes came to regard him with respect, knowing him by the affectionate epithet Milkha Singh Pindiwala.

== Military campaigns ==
=== Pothohar Campaigns in 1770s ===
The region around Rawalpindi and the Salt Range was contested by a number of entrenched local powers, including Gakhar chiefs and tribal groupings such as the Awans, Guleras and Dhunds. In the course of the Bhangi advance, these groups were gradually subdued or brought into tributary relations. The broader campaign unfolded under Gujjar Singh Bhangi, but Milkha Singh was the chief entrusted with administering and defending the conquered belt.

By around 1770, following the subjugation of the Gakhars, a substantial portion of the conquered villages in the parganah of Fatahpur Baoarh was placed under Milkha Singh's supervision. Some 192 villages were assigned to his authority on light tribute terms, while the remainder was kept under direct management. His role in this region was therefore not limited to raiding, it formed part of a deliberate effort to secure long-term Bhangi control over the frontier through jagir distribution and military oversight.

=== Attempted advance toward Kashmir ===
One of the few clearly recorded independent operations attributed to Milkha Singh was an attempt to push toward Kashmir. Operating from Rawalpindi, he advanced beyond Murree as far as Kohala on the Jhelum River, where the Winter season caused heavy casualties forcing him to Withdraw.

=== Operations during Shah Zaman's invasions ===
During the Durrani invasions under Zaman Shah Durrani, Milkha Singh played an active part in the Sikh response. In the campaign of 1796–1797, he assisted in the recovery of Rohtas Fort, and when Shah Zaman sent forces toward Hasan Abdal, he moved to confront the Afghan advance in that sector. After an engagement lasting several hours, with casualties on both sides, he was forced to fall back toward Rohtas.

In April 1797, following the death of Ahmad Khan Shahanchibashi, the Durrani governor at Rohtas, Milkha Singh recovered his position and re-established his outpost at Kali Sarai near Panja Sahib. The Hazara chiefs subsequently acknowledged his nominal authority, confirming that despite these temporary reverses he remained a significant frontier commander in the upper Pothohar-Hazara zone.

=== Hazara and nominal frontier suzerainty ===
After the recovery of his territory in 1797 and the re-establishment of his outpost at Kali Sarae near Panja Sahib, several chiefs of Hazara district acknowledged nominal allegiance to Milkha Singh. These included Sadat Khan, head of the Swathis; Jafar Khan, chief of the Khanpur Gakhars; Gulsher Khan, head of the Pallal Tanolis; Najibullah Khan, the Tareen chief who governed much of the Hazara plain until 1799; and, after his death, his widow Bari Begam, who managed affairs with the help of Muqaddam Musharraf.

=== Campaign of 1798–1799 ===
Milkha Singh's military activity increased with the concerns Shah Zaman's last invasion of 1798–1799, during which he commanded 2,000 horse. When Shah Zaman crossed the Indus at Attock, local chiefs rose against the Sikhs, and Milkha Singh fought two engagements with the Mullukia zamindars at Sarai Kali and Rawalpindi. The outpost at Sarai Kali had to be evacuated, and Milkha Singh, together with Ran Singh Pada and Kala Singh, withdrew from the frontier line.

During the retreat, two of his assistants left behind to collect baggage were overtaken by the Afghan advance guard, defeated, captured, and later executed at Attock after ransom had already been accepted. Milkha Singh himself fell back to Rohtas, where he joined other Sikh chiefs, including Ranjit Singh, before reaching Amritsar on 24 December 1798 with 500 horse to take part in the broader Sikh concentration there.

When Shah Zaman resolved to retire from Lahore, Milkha Singh and Chait Singh Bhangi moved from Amritsar during the night of 3–4 January 1799 and encamped near the city. After the Durrani withdrawal across the Ravi, they entered Lahore and re-established Sikh authority there, placing Milkha Singh among the chiefs who participated directly in the recovery of the city following the Afghan retreat.

== Death and legacy ==
Milkha Singh died in 1804. At the time of his death, his territory was said to yield an annual revenue of three lakhs of rupees and he commanded 2,000 horse. Ranjit Singh is described as having addressed him as Baba out of respect.

He was succeeded by his son Jiwan Singh, who served under Ranjit Singh and held the office of thanedar of the fort of Rawalpindi. Jiwan Singh accompanied the Kashmir expedition of 1814 and died in 1815. After his death, the Lahore state absorbed the family's territory; Jiwan Singh's troops were incorporated into the Lahore army, and his son Anand Singh continued in service under Ranjit Singh.

Milkha Singh's historical significance lies in his role in extending Bhangi power into the north-western Punjab and in the early development of Rawalpindi as a fortified and commercially active Sikh centre on the frontier.

== Bibliography ==
- Gupta, Hari Ram (1999). History of the Sikhs, Vol. II: Evolution of Sikh Confederacies (1708–69). New Delhi: Munshiram Manoharlal Publishers Pvt. Ltd.
- Gupta, Hari Ram (1999). History of the Sikhs, Vol. IV: The Sikh Commonwealth or Rise and Fall of Sikh Misls. New Delhi: Munshiram Manoharlal Publishers Pvt. Ltd.
- Singh, Dalbir (2010). Rise, Growth And Fall Of Bhangi Misal.
