= Pharwala Fort =

15th-century fort in Rawalpindi, Pakistan

- قلعہ پھروالہ
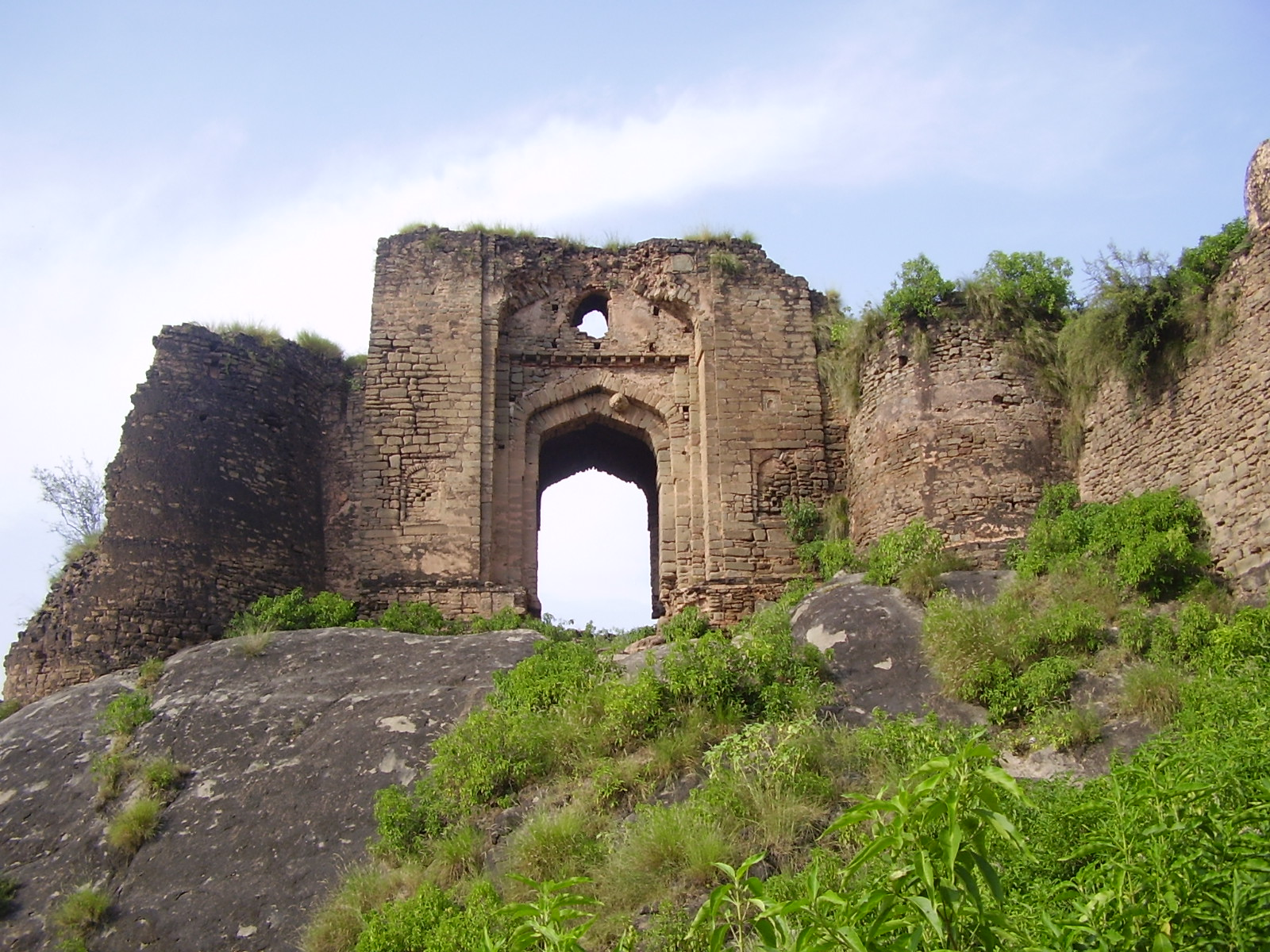
- The Pharwala Fort as seen from the eastern bank of the Soan River

General information
- Location: Rawalpindi District, Pakistan
- Coordinates: 33.61944°N 73.29917°E
- Completed: 15th Century
- Owner: Department of Archaeology and Museums

Technical details
- Grounds: 1.8 km2

Pharwala Fort (Punjabi:قلعہ پھروالہ) is a 15th-century fort located near Kahuta Tehsil, about 40 km from Rawalpindi in Punjab, Pakistan. The fort is naturally defended on one side by the Himalayan range and on the other by the Soan River. It is spread over an area of 1.8 square kilometres (450 acres), and was once the capital of the Pothohar Chieftaincy.

It is located near the Mai Qumro Mosque in Bagh Juggian, considered the oldest mosque in Islamabad. The mosque is located on the west bank of the Soan River.

== Gates ==
The fort originally had six gates, but only five exist now. They are made of sandstone blocks. The gates were named the Hathi Gate ('Elephant Gate', towards the north-eastern corner), the Begum Gate (towards the south-western corner), the Fort Gate, the Lashkari Gate, the Ziarat Gate, and the Bagh Gate.

== Uses ==
The fort served as a defence headquarters, and could house 500 soldiers, 100 horses, and 50 elephants. Moreover, around 10 to 15 graves of Gakhar rulers of the time also exist inside the complex.

== History ==
The fort was originally built in the 11th century by Sultan Kaigohar Gakhar, who was an associate of Mahmud of Ghazni. In 1205, Muhammad of Ghor attacked it during his first invasion of the area. Two years later, in 1207, Qutb ud-Din Aibak attacked it.

During the invasion of Timur in 1398, it was under the control of Khokhar or Gakhar chieftain Jasrat, who possibly re-fortified it. The Mughal Emperor Babur conquered the fort in March 1519, but afterwards the Gakhars under the leadership of their chieftain Sarang Khan Gakhar reconciled with him. As a result, their lands were given back to them.

The Gakhars hence joined Humayun's cause when he was overthrown by Sher Shah Suri, who built the Rohtas Fort around 100 km south of the Pharwala Fort overlooking the Pothohar Plateau in order to subdue the unruly Gakhars. Sher Shah Suri attacked the Pharwala Fort in 1540, as the Gakhars continuously attacked the Rohtas Fort. After Sher Shah died in 1545, his son, Islam Shah Suri, carried on the war effort, leading to a series of attacks against the Gakhars at Pharwala Fort. The ownership of the fort changed hands several times during these years, but the Gakhars were never completely defeated during this time. The Suris were eventually expelled from the region when Humayun's army arrived in February 1555 to reclaim his throne. Due to their support and loyalty, the Gakhars under Sultan Adam were reinstated to their previous positions by the Mughals.

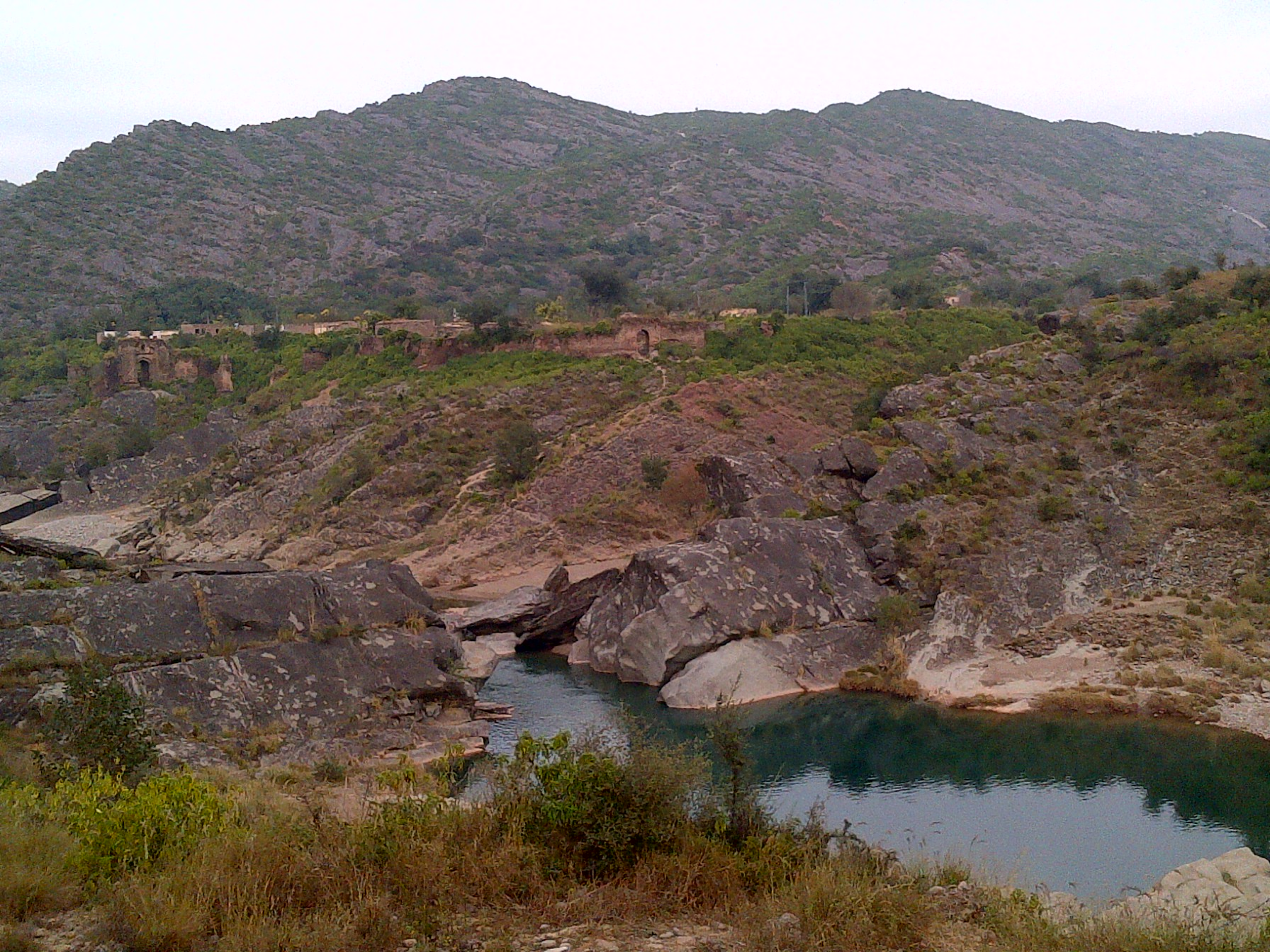
Pharwala Fort as seen from the western bank of the Soan River

The Gakhars under Muqarrab Khan faced their next threat from Gujjar Singh Bhangi, one of the Sikh rulers of Lahore. He was able to subdue them and gain their territories in the surrounding areas, but the Pharwala Fort continued to be under the control of the Gakhars.

The Gakhars' command over the fort ended in 1818, when a Sikh force led by Maharaja Ranjit Singh seized all of their lands. However, in 1928, some of their property rights in Pharwala were given back to them.

In 1857, the fort came under British rule and remained under them until 1947. The fort was then handed over to the Government of Pakistan. In 1980, the Federal Department of Archaeology and Museums declared the fort a “protected” site.

However, over the years, the fort suffered from neglect and disrepair. Several parts of the fort, including the fortification walls, had collapsed with time. Encroachments by nearby houses also affected the structure.

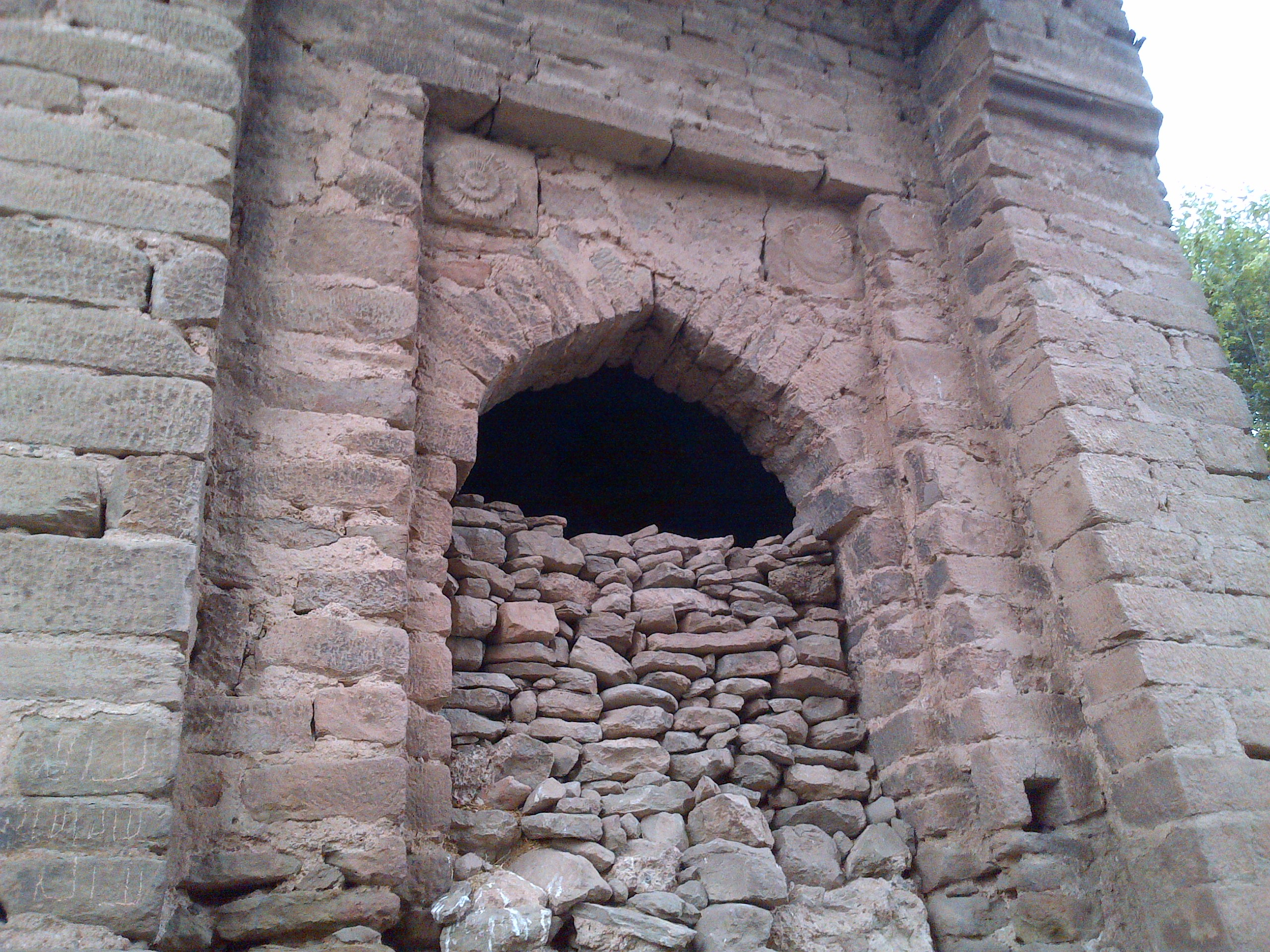
Wall and gate of the fort

== Conservation efforts ==
In October 2009, the Federal Department of Archaeology and Museums announced that it was planning to protect the fort from further decay and destruction caused by the natural climate factors.

In September 2023, the Department of Archaeology and Museums started conservation and preservation works on the once-neglected fort. This included clearing dense foliage from the surrounding area, excavating two-feet-deep debris, engaging the local community to ensure security arrangements, and establishing various facilities to support the conservation efforts. The renovated fort was declared open to the public in January 2024.

== See also ==
- List of World Heritage Sites in Pakistan
- List of forts in Pakistan
- List of museums in Pakistan
- Sar Jalal
- Rohtas Fort
- Rawat Fort
- Manikyala Stupa
