= Sukh Jiwan Mal =

Raja of Kashmir from 1754 to 1762

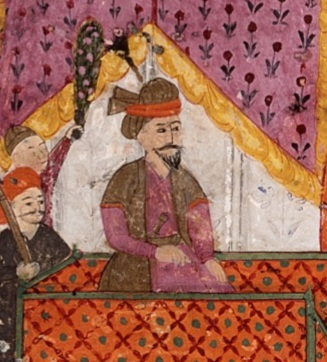
- "A King Enthroned on a Terrace", folio from a Shahnama (Book of Kings). Kashmir, 18th century

Raja of Kashmir
- Reign: June 1754 – October 1762
- Predecessor: Position established
- Successor: Position abolished
- Prime Minister: Abu'l Hasan Bandey (1754–1757, 1758); Mir Muqim Kanth (1757–1758); Pandit Mahanand Dhar (1758–1762)

Governor of Kashmir
- In office 1753 – June 1754
- Monarch: Ahmad Shah Durrani
- Deputy: Khwaja Kijak Khan
- Preceded by: Abdullah Khan Kabuli
- Succeeded by: Nur-ud-Din Khan Bamzai (1762)

Deputy Governor of Kashmir
- In office 1752–1753
- Monarch: Ahmad Shah Durrani
- Governor: Abdullah Khan Kabuli
- Preceded by: Abdullah Khan Kabuli
- Succeeded by: Khwaja Kijak Khan

Personal details
- Born: c. 1720 Bhera, Lahore Subah, Mughal Empire (present-day Punjab, Pakistan)
- Died: 1762 Lahore, Durrani Empire (present-day Punjab, Pakistan)
- Occupation: Soldier; officer; advisor; politician
- Religion: Hinduism

Military service
- Allegiance: Durrani Empire; Kingdom of Kashmir
- Branch/service: Durrani Army; Kashmiri Army
- Rank: Lieutenant; Faujdar; Naib-Sipahsalar; Subedar
- Battles/wars: Mughal–Afghan Wars; Siege of Srinagar (1748); Battle of Shopian (1752); Afghan–Kashmir War; Battle of Chera Har (1762); Afghan–Maratha War; Third Battle of Panipat

Sukh Jiwan Mal was the ruler of Kashmir from 1754 to 1762. He quickly rose from the rank of a soldier in the Durrani Army to a Dewan in the government of Ahmad Shah Durrani. He became the governor (amir) in 1753 after a successful coup and subsequent execution of his predecessor Abdullah Khan, finally becoming an independent ruler in 1754 after shifting his allegiance to the Mughal Empire.

He was deposed after campaign by the Afghan forces in 1762 and executed in the same year. He is regarded as the last independent, as well as the last Hindu, monarch of Kashmir.

== Early life ==
Sukh Jiwan Mal was born and raised in the city of Bhera, then in the Subah of Lahore, into a Punjabi Hindu Khatri family.

== Rise to power ==
Kashmir under Afghan rulers was in a state of ruin. Its people faced torture and murder during the reign of Afghans. The very first Afghan chief Abdullah Khan Isk Aquasi appointed by Ahmad Shah Abdali would line up all Kashmiris whom he considered rich and would ask them to either part with their wealth or to face death. The Afghan army would often raid and loot common Kashmiri houses.

After the loot and plunder, Abdullah Khan Isk Aquasi returned to Kabul leaving Kashmir under the charge of Abdullah Khan Kabuli. Kabuli appointed Sukh Jiwan as his chief advisor. A local leader of the Kashmiri Muslims, Abu'l Hasan Bandey wanted to get rid of the cruel Afghan rulers. Bandey convinced Sukh Jiwan to kill Kabuli and become independent. Subsequently, Kabuli was assassinated and Sukh Jiwan became the independent ruler after formally getting the title of raja from the Mughal emperor.

== Reign ==
As the ruler of Kashmir, Sukh Jiwan appointed Bandey as his prime minister. To suppress the rebellion, Ahmad Shah Abdali sent Khwaja Kijak and Abdullah Khan Isk Aquasi to Kashmir. They were both defeated. In another occasion, Afghan prisoners of war were paraded in the streets with Kashmiri crowds spitting at them. The locals of Kashmir were at large happy with the smooth and efficient administration, but it did not last very long. A devastating famine occurred in 1755 followed by a locust attack. These natural calamities forced the locals to desperately eat dead locusts. Sukh Jiwan distributed 80 lakh kilogrammes of rice for free among the poor people.

According to Schwartz, "Kashmir's only respite from economic and political pressures during the Afghan and Sikh rule occurred during the reign of Sukh Jiwan Mal, marked by a flowering of literacy activity attached to patronage." Sukh Jiwan held weekly symposiums to which he invited all the poets. He also employed poets to produce history of Kashmir in the style of Book of Kings. Under the advice of Mahanand Dhar, Sukh Jiwan in order to facilitate his work imported many Khatri Hindus from Punjab to Kashmir.

== Death ==
When force did not work, Abdali used wit to get control of Kashmir. He attempted to destroy the good relations between Sukh Jiwan and Bandey by putting a wedge against them. Taking advantage of this situation, Abdali sent an army led by Nur-ud-Din Khan Bamzai to Kashmir. A major portion of Raja Sukh Jiwan's army including his commander-in-chief Bakht Mal betrayed him. Eventually, he was captured, blinded and sent to Abdali in Lahore where he was killed by being trampled under an elephant.

== See also ==
- Kabuli Mal
- Kaura Mal
