= Battle of Poonch =

Battle of Poonch may refer to the following battles fought in Poonch, India:

- Military operations in Poonch (1948), during the India–Pakistan war of 1947–1948
- Battle of Poonch (1971), during the India–Pakistan war of 1971
