= Dahan Gali =

Dhaan Gali
- Village
- Location within Pakistan
- Coordinates: 33°20′5″N 73°33′32″E
- Country: Pakistan
- UC: MANYANDA
- Tehsil: Kallar Syedan
- District: Rawalpindi
- Time zone: UTC+5 (PST)

Dhaan Gali is a village in MANYANDA Union Council of Kallar Syedan Tehsil, Rawalpindi District in the Punjab Province of Pakistan.

== Schools in Dhaan Gali ==
- Government Elementary School Dhaan Gali
