= Chibhal =

Former Kingdom in India

Chibhal or Bhimber state was a region in modern day Azad Kashmir.

== History ==
The inhabitants of the state were known as Chibhalis.

Meanwhile, conspiracies were reaching new heights in the Punjab plains following the conquest of all other Sikh Misls by the chief who went by the name Ranjit Singh was consolidating his rule over the various Sikh misls and absorbing them into his Sikh Empire. This Sikh chief was able to conquer a large part of Bhimber but was ultimately unable to defeat Raja Sultan Khan, the ruler of Bhimber. These conquered areas were given to a distant relative of Raja Sultan Khan. Raja Sultan was able to retake most of the lost territories after defeating and executing the treacherous relative. This angered the Sikhs. The resulting Sikh invasion was led by Kharak Singh, son of Ranjit Singh. Kharak Singh was militarily humiliated by Raja Sultan Khan and was forced to retreat. Sultan Khan devised an ingenious strategy to lead his forces to the hilltop, an area where the opposing armies were unaccustomed to fighting in mountainous terrain. This led to a fierce battle which resulted in a great Muslim victory against the Sikhs in which Greater Bhimber defeated the armies of famous Sikh Maharaja of Punjab. Later on the state's territories were reduced to no more than twenty five kilometres due to constant invasions from the Sikh Empire. The state was then referred to as the state of Bhimber. At that time it included the towns of Bhimber, Samhani and Mangal Devi. The Chibhalis were known to fiercely resist the Sikhs. They were seen as a threat by Maharaja Ranjit Singh. The son of Maharaja Ranjit Singh i.e. Prince Kharak Singh, had called Raja Sultan Khan of Bhimber to Jammu to sign a peace treaty but there Raja Sultan Khan was treacherously put in jail, his kingdom was invaded and annexed into the Sikh Empire.
