= Karnal Sher Khan Shaheed Road =

Road from Islamabad to Rawalpindi, Pakistan

IJ Principal Road
- Karnal Sher Khan Shaheed Road
- Native name: سڑکِ آئی جے پی (Urdu)
- Maintained by: Capital Development Authority
- Length: 10.2 km (6.3 mi)
- Nearest Rawalpindi-Islamabad Metrobus station: IJP Station
- West end: N-5 National Highway
- East end: Faizabad Interchange

Karnal Sher Khan Shaheed Road (Urdu: سڑکِ کرنال شیر خان شہید), previously known as the IJP Road (Urdu: سڑکِ آئی جے پی), or the Inter-Junction Principal Road, is one of the busiest roads in the Islamabad–Rawalpindi metropolitan area in Pakistan, connecting Islamabad to Rawalpindi. It also serves as a route for traffic coming from Punjab and Azad Kashmir going towards Taxila, Attock, and onwards to Khyber Pakhtunkhwa. It is named IJ Principle Road because it is the road that was going to be between the never-built Sector J and Sector I of Islamabad.

It starts at N-5 National Highway in the west and ends at Faizabad Interchange in the east, where it meets the Islamabad Expressway and Murree Road. The total length of the road is 10.2 kilometers.

== Repairs and renovation ==
Over the years, several potholes had appeared on the road due to the heavy volume of trucks (from the Islamabad wholesale market and Sabzi Mandi) and buses (from the Pirwadhai bus stand) using it. Regular maintenance and repairs were not carried out in time by the Capital Development Authority. Triple surface treatment repair work was done in 2016–17, but major repairs were still needed.

IN December 2017, the Development Working Party of the Capital Development Authority approved the project concept-II for the uplift of the road. It then launched a tender to hire a consultant who would prepare a rehabilitation plan for the road. Four firms responded to the tender: Zeerak International, National Engineering Services Pakistan (NESPAK), EA Associates, and ACC Consultants, out of which the former was hired in April 2020. It presented its plan in October 2020, which had an estimated cost of Rs. 5.322 billion.

In 2021, the government launched a plan to rebuild and widen the dual carriageway by adding two additional lanes on either side at a cost of Rs. 4.9 billion, while Rs. 120 million was earmarked for environmental protection and conservation. The renovation project also envisaged two flyovers, two bridges (at Katarian and Pirwadhai), and seven culverts as well. The National Logistics Cell was awarded the contract for the project. It is planned to be completed by April 2023.
