= Transport in Islamabad =

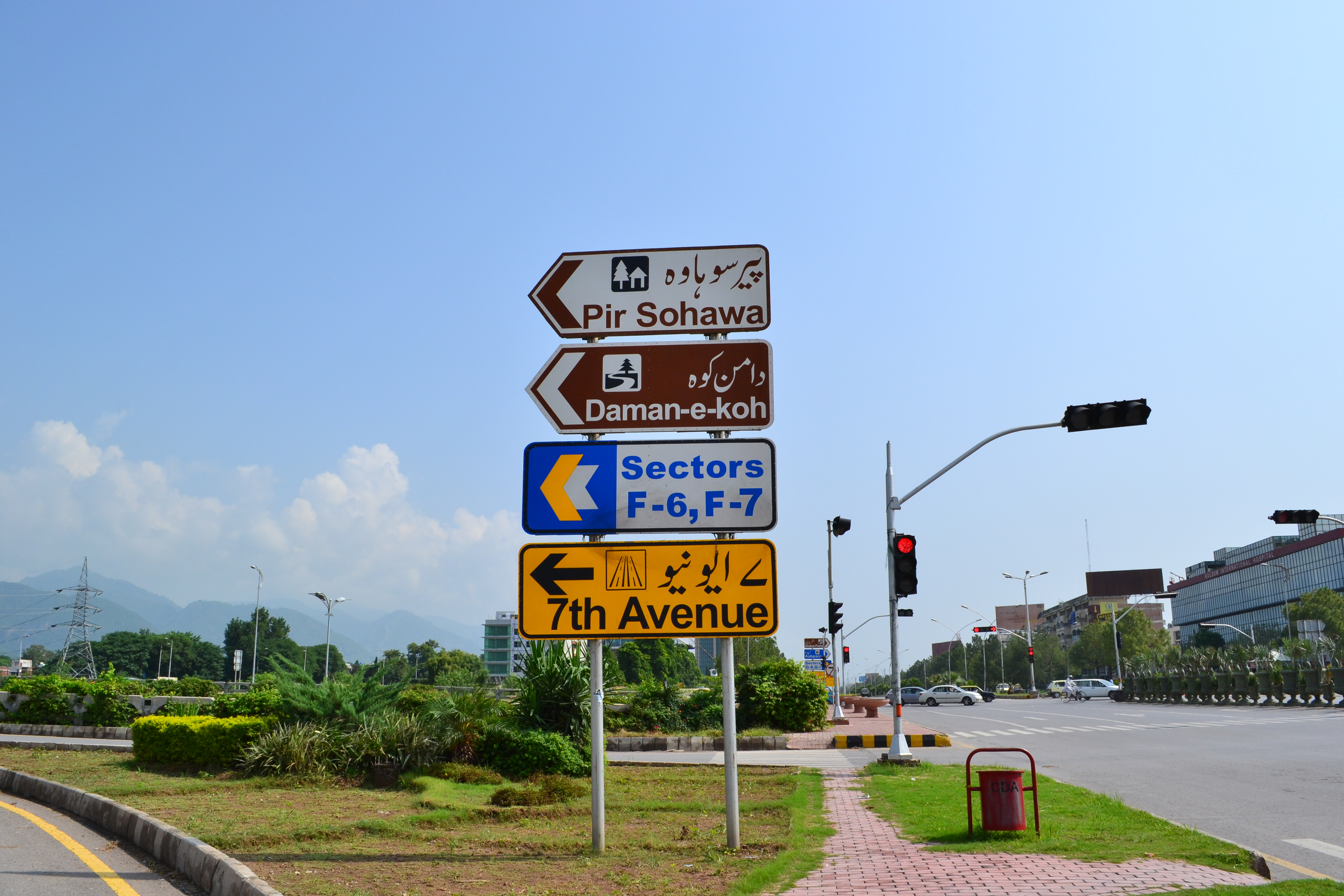
A road sign in Islamabad

The transport system in Islamabad, the capital of Pakistan, connects it with all major cities and towns via regular trains and bus services running mostly from the neighbouring city of Rawalpindi.

Lahore and Peshawar are linked to Islamabad through a network of motorways which has resulted in a significant reduction in travelling times between these cities. M-2 Motorway is 367 km long and connects Islamabad with Lahore, whereas M-1 Motorway connects Islamabad with Peshawar and is 155 km long. Islamabad is linked to its twin city Rawalpindi through the Faizabad Interchange, the first cloverleaf interchange in Pakistan, with a daily traffic volume of about 48,000 vehicles (2011).

== Road transport ==
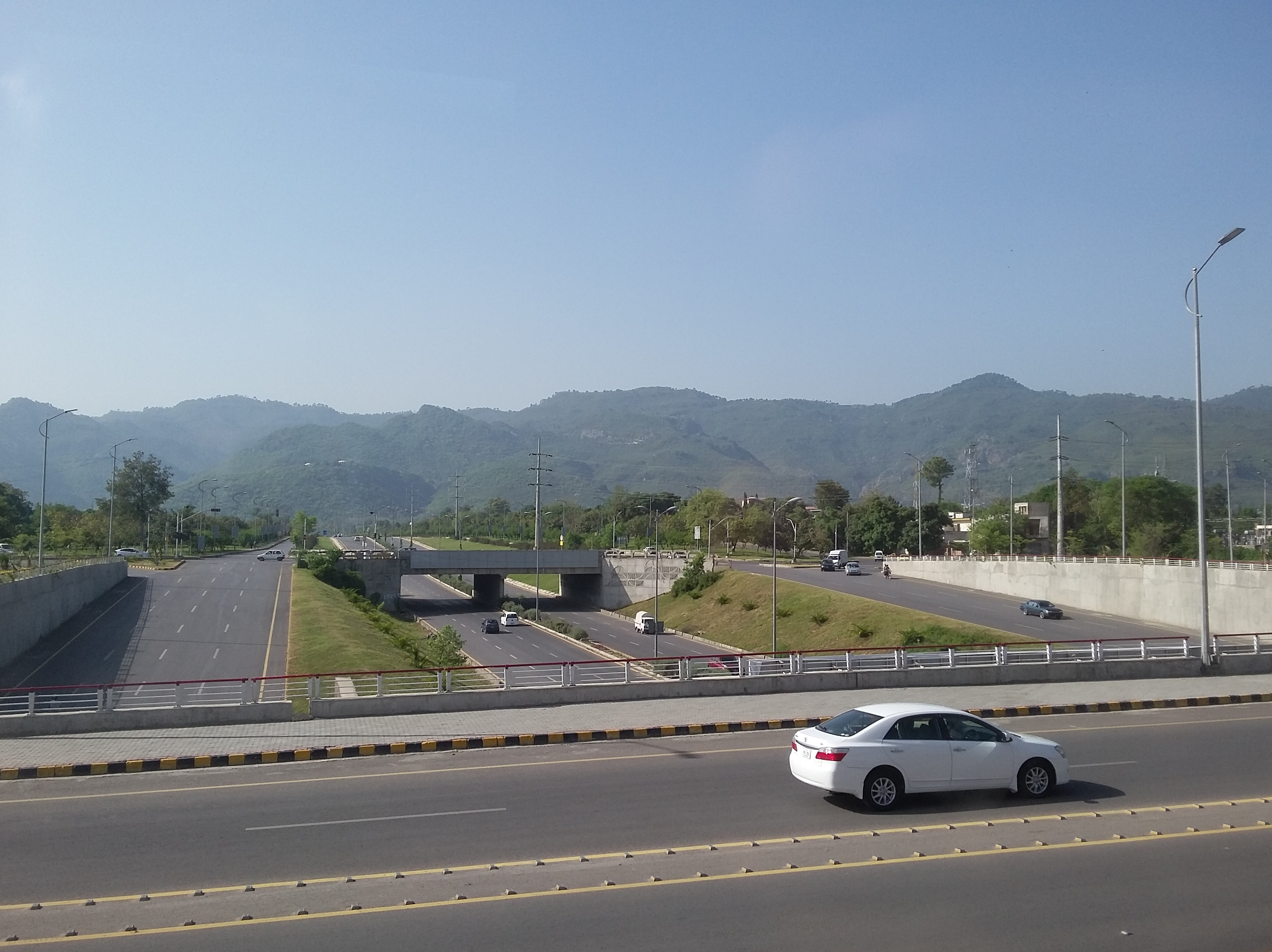
7th Avenue Islamabad

=== Motorways ===
M-2 Motorway is 367 km long and connects Islamabad with Lahore. M-1 Motorway connects Islamabad with Peshawar and is 155 km long.

=== National Highways & Expressways ===
- Islamabad Expressway
- E-75 Expressway
- Margalla/Iran Avenue
- N-5 National Highway
- N-80 National Highway

== Public transport ==
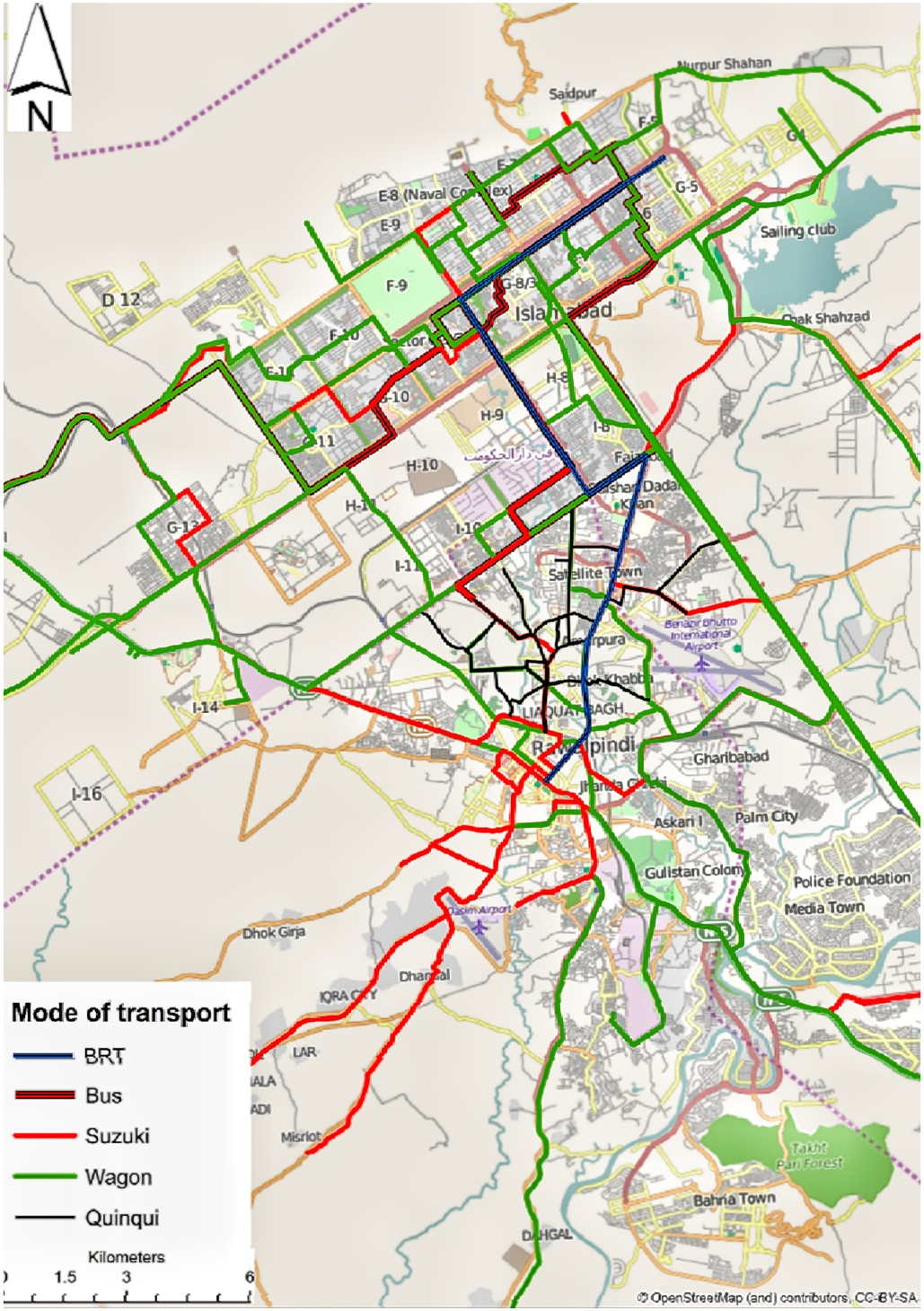
Public transport network in Islamabad–Rawalpindi metropolitan area

=== Local buses and wagons ===
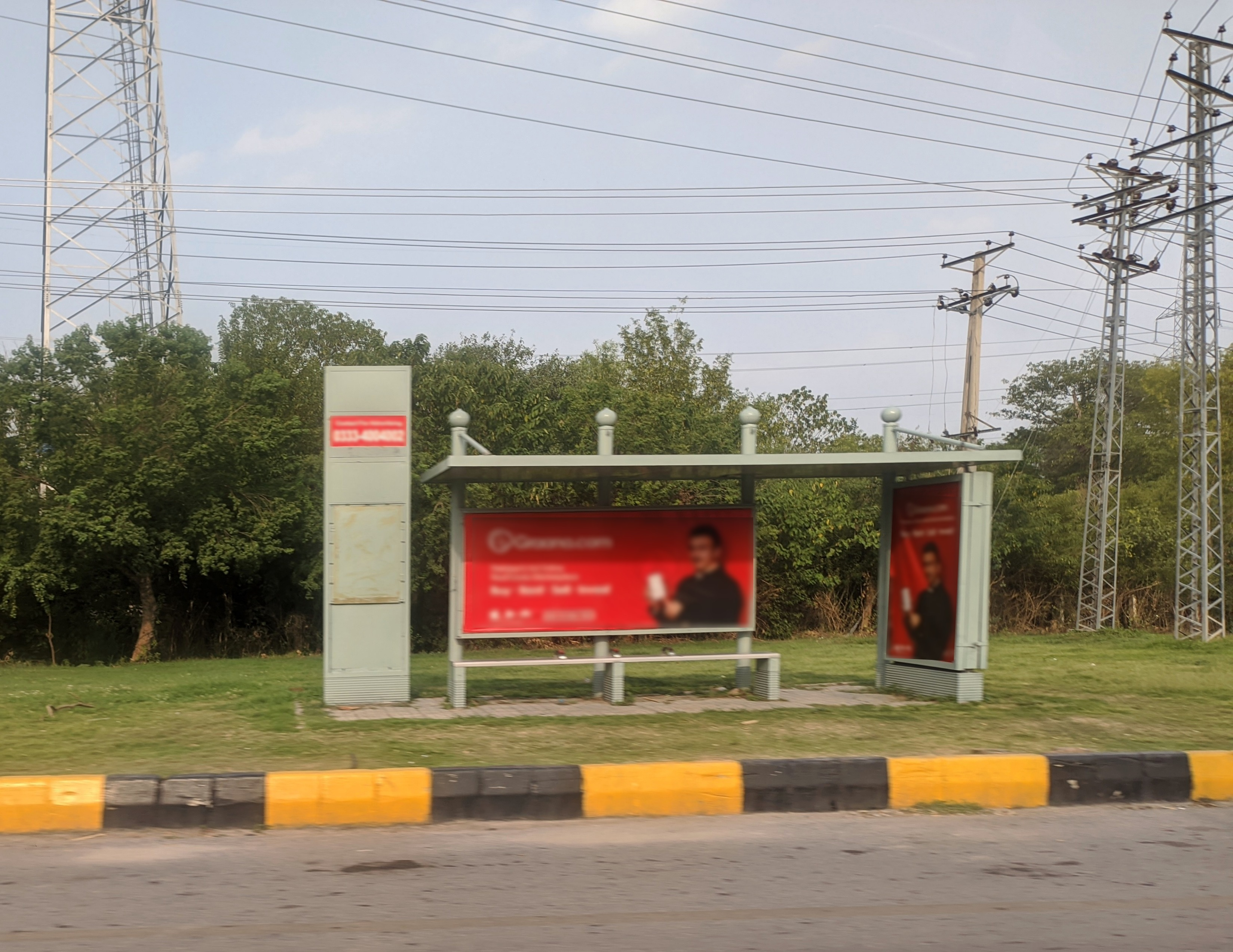
A model bus stop at Kashmir Chowk (Adjacent to Islamabad Club)

The Islamabad Capital Territory Administration operates buses to serve the local community. As of 2021, there are 15 operational routes along which the buses and wagons operate.

=== Metrobus ===
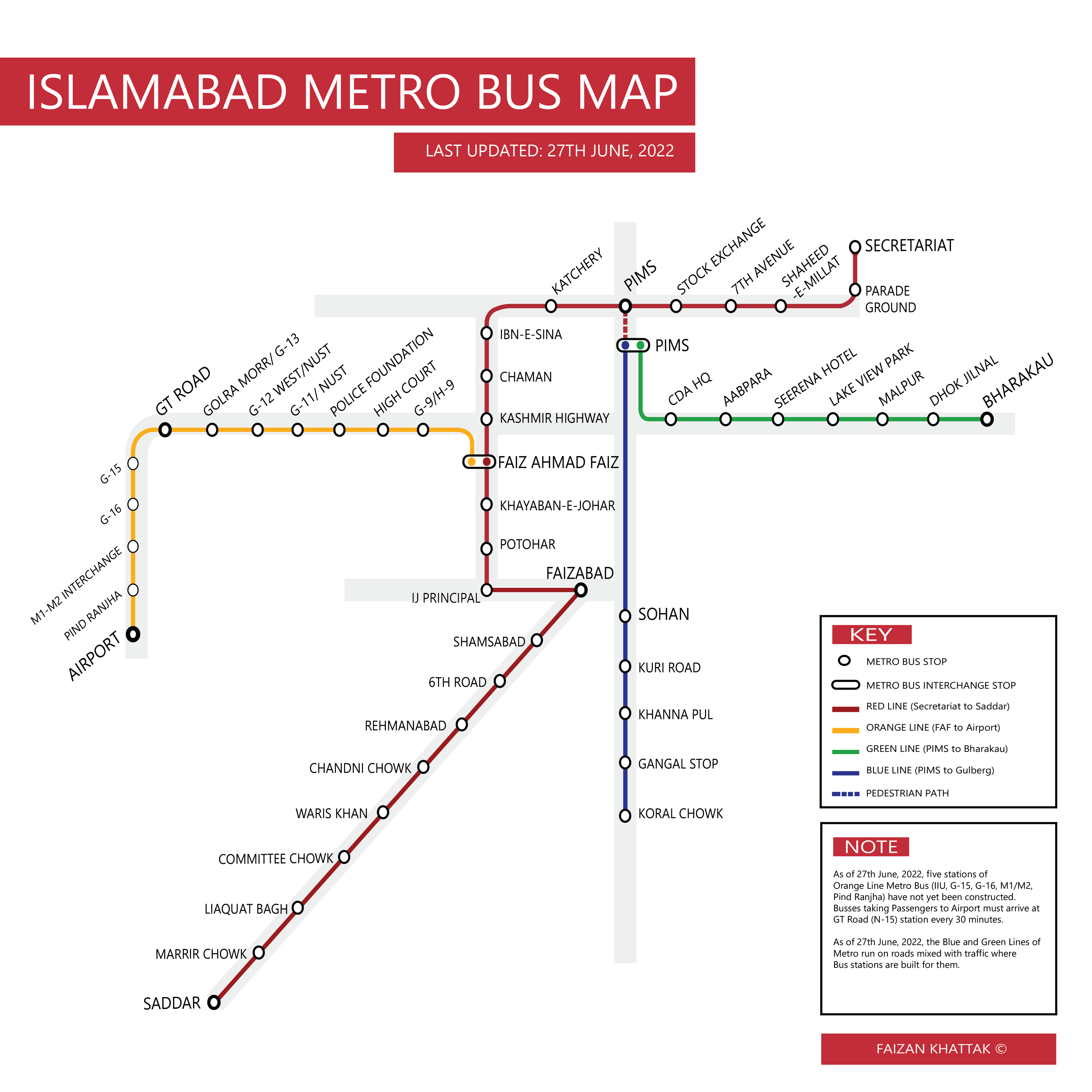
Map of Rawalpindi - Islamabad Metro Bus

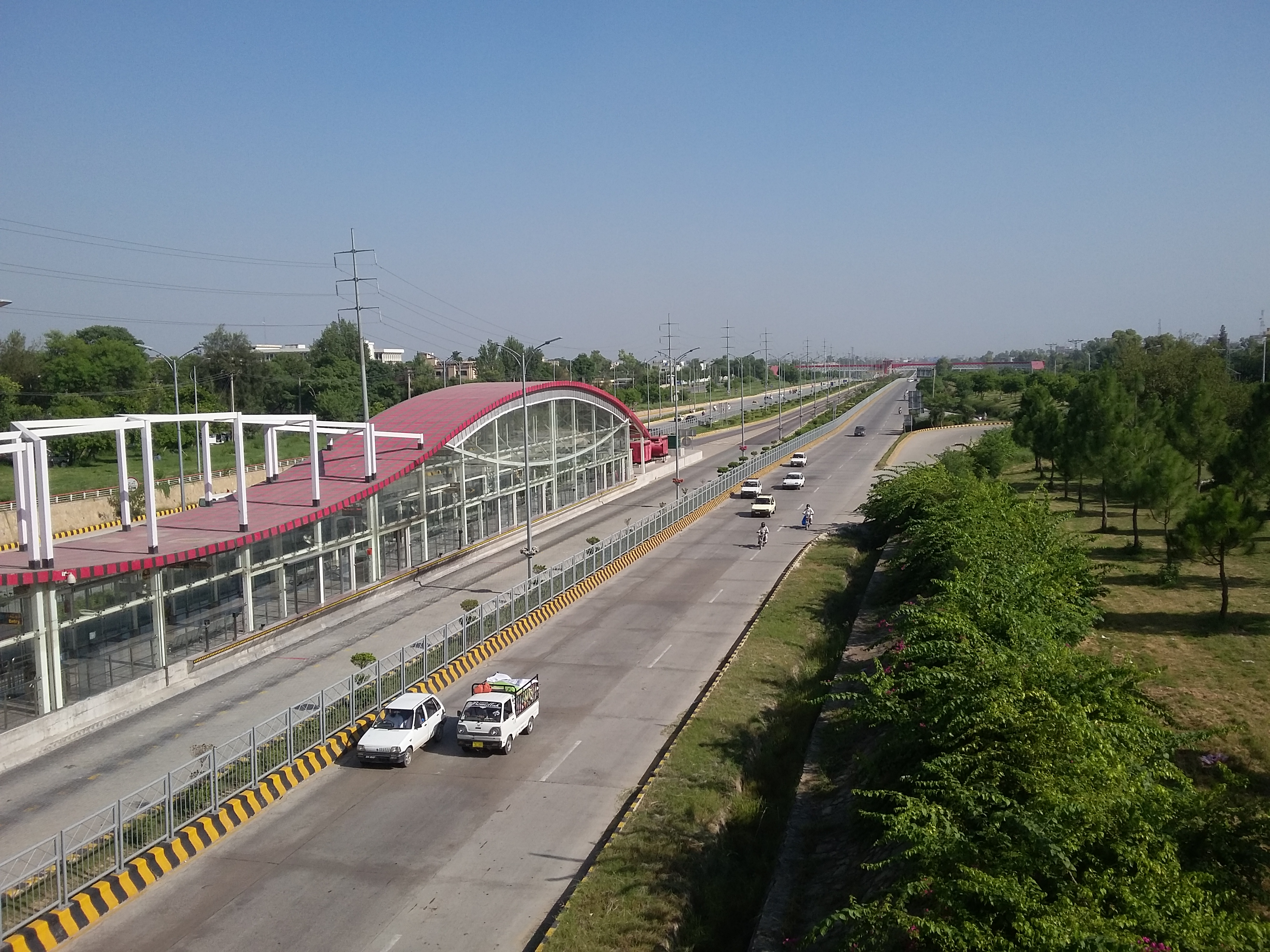
Metrobus Station Islamabad

The Rawalpindi-Islamabad Metrobus is a 48.1 km (29.9 mi) bus rapid transit system operating in the Islamabad–Rawalpindi metropolitan area of Pakistan. It consists of four routes, namely the Red, Orange, Blue, and Green Lines. The Red and Orange Lines have dedicated lanes with proper stations built along them, while the Blue and Green Lines currently run along the Islamabad Expressway and Srinagar Highway respectively, with regular traffic.

Line	Operator	Opening date	Length	Route	Number of stations	Number of buses	Frequency	Journey time (end to end)	Notes
Red	PMA and CDA	4 June 2015	22.5 km (14.0 mi)	Pak Secretariat – Saddar	24	68	Every 4 to 8 minutes during daytime hours (06:00-20:00)		
Orange	CDA	18 April 2022	25.6 km (15.9 mi)	Faiz Ahmed Faiz Station (H-8/2) – Airport	7	15	Every 5 minutes		
Blue	CDA	7 July 2022	20 km (12 mi)	PIMS – Gulberg	13	10		One hour	
Green	CDA	7 July 2022	15.5 km (9.6 mi)	PIMS – Bharakau	8	5			

=== Sightseeing buses ===
The Tourism Development Corporation Punjab operates tourist buses from Allama Iqbal Park and Shamsabad bringing tourists to Constitution Avenue via Shakarparian. The main attractions on the bus route include Faisal Mosque, Marghrzar Zoo, Daman-e-Koh, Constitution Avenue, Lok Virsa, Pakistan Museum of Natural History, Shakarparian, Rose and Jasmine Garden, Allama Iqbal Park, and Rawalpindi Cricket Stadium.

=== Light rail transit and monorail proposals ===
Some Chinese firms have shown keen interests on constructing a monorail and light rail system in the federal capital Islamabad.

=== Public transportation issues ===
Surveys conducted in 2012 for the Pre-Feasibility Study of the Bus rapid transit have shown that more than 90% of residents of the city are unhappy with the current public transportation system of the city.

The lack of a better public transport system and low emphasis on walkability has led to rapid growth in the vehicle population and has made the city planning more automobile-centric to cope with increasing traffic. The accompanying petroleum consumption and the now car-centric city planning - accompanying the rapid expansion of city have also caused environmental pollution and damage.

== Private transport ==
=== Ride hailing ===
People use private ride hailing services like Careem, Uber, Bykea, and InDriver for their local journeys. In March 2016, Careem introduced its service in Islamabad and Rawalpindi. In September 2019, Swvl expanded its operations to Islamabad.

Pakistan's first electric scooter sharing service, ezBike, is headquartered in Islamabad.

=== Taxicabs ===
Most of the registered taxicabs in Islamabad were introduced during 1990s through loan packages from Yellow Cab Scheme. There are also some privately owned taxicab services such as those offered by Albayrak and Metro Radio Cab.

=== Bus companies ===
Daewoo Express and several other bus transport companies also operate in Islamabad.

== Rail transport ==
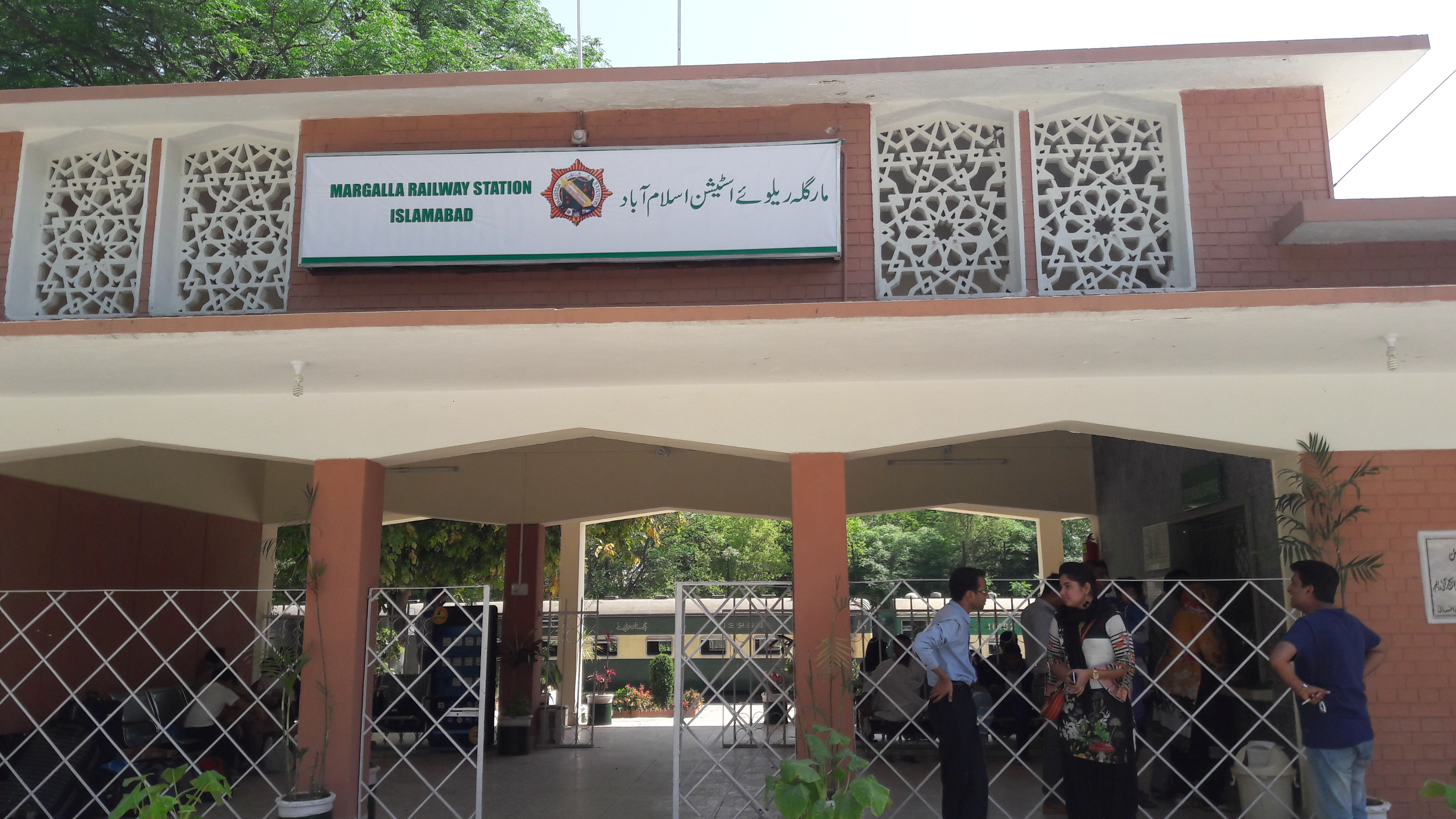
Islamabad railway station

The following stations serve Islamabad by rail:

- Rawalpindi railway station, located in Saddar, Rawalpindi, is one of several major railway stations on the Karachi–Peshawar Railway Line. The nearest Saddar Metrobus Station, part of the Rawalpindi-Islamabad Metrobus is 20 minutes (1.5 km) walk away.
- Margalla railway station is located in sector I-9 Islamabad, Capital Territory, Pakistan.
- Golra Sharif Station, also known as Pakistan Railways Heritage Museum, is a railway museum located near the Sector F-13 of Islamabad, the capital of Pakistan. It is a junction station in Rawalpindi Division of the Pakistan Railways, located at 1,994 feet above sea level, in the southeast of the Margalla Hills and east of the cradle of Gandhara civilization, the ancient city of Taxila.
- Tarnol railway station, located in a suburb of Islamabad, is nearest to the Islamabad International Airport.

== Air transport ==
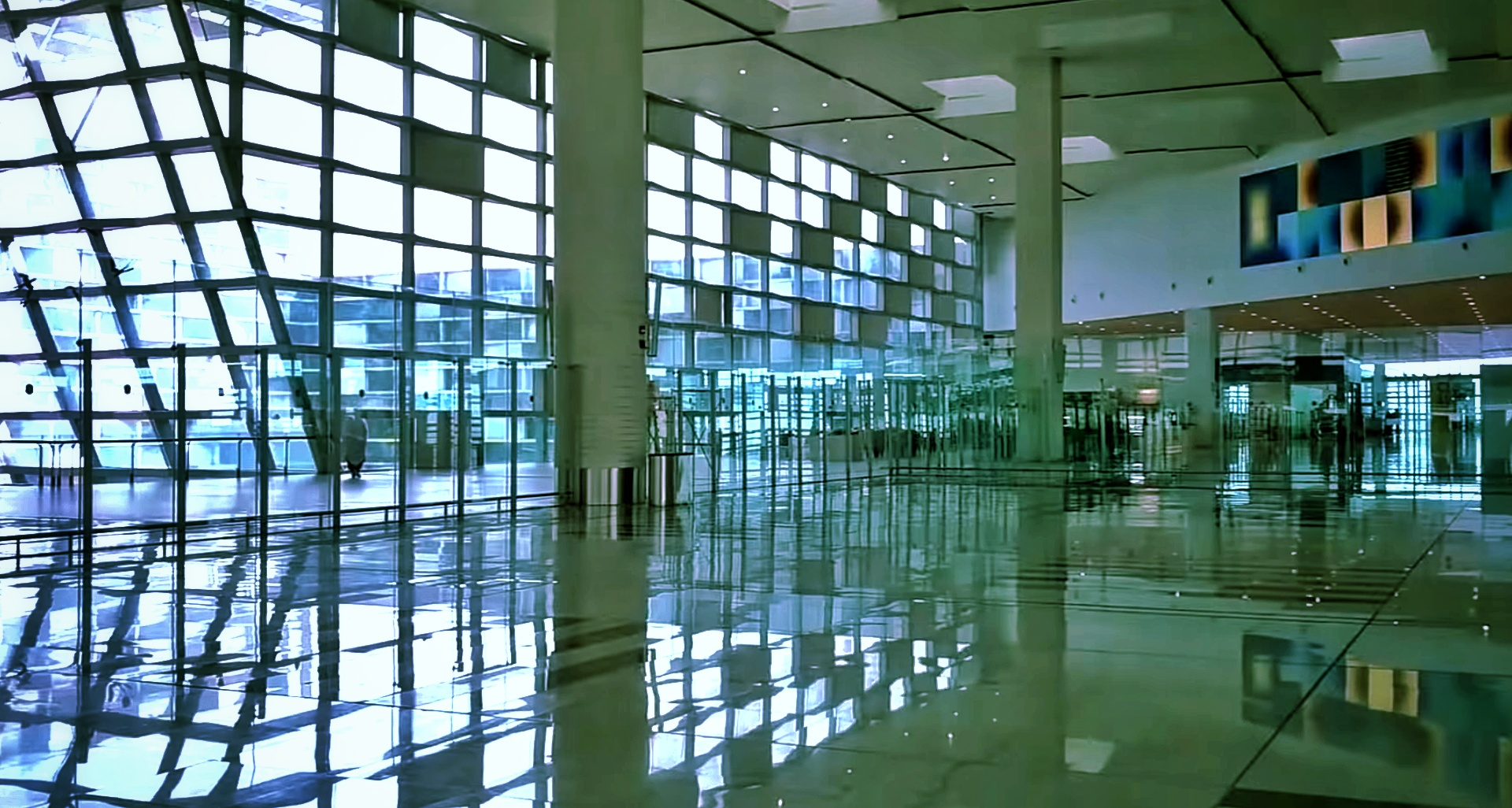
Islamabad International Airport

Islamabad is connected to major destinations around the world through the Islamabad International Airport, which replaced the old Benazir Bhutto International Airport in April 2018. The new airport is the largest in Pakistan. It is the first green field airport in Pakistan and has an area of 3,600-acre (15 km^{2}).

== See also ==
- Transport in Pakistan
- Transport in Karachi
- Transport in Lahore
