= Rawalpindi-Islamabad Circular Railway =

Railway line in Pakistan

Overview
- Service type: Circular Railway
- Status: Under construction
- Locale: Rawalpindi and Islamabad, Pakistan

Route
- Termini: Rawalpindi; Islamabad
- Distance travelled: 100 km

Rawalpindi Islamabad Circular Railway is a mega project aimed at improving the socio-economic conditions of the local people. The project is expected to solve various problems, especially traffic jams.

== Overview ==
The project includes the construction of a circular railway track for Rawalpindi which will also be included in the Leh Expressway project. The track will be 100 km long connecting Islamabad and Rawalpindi. The project was expected to be completed in 2023 but has not yet been completed.

=== Execution ===
China Civil Engineering Construction Corporation (CCECC) has been entrusted with the task of carrying out the feasibility study of the project. In 2020, a ten-member team of CCECC visited various points of the Leh Nala as part of the project feasibility study along with the Leh Expressway project. The company signed a memorandum of understanding with the Rawalpindi Development Authority (RDA) and Capital Development Authority (CDA) in May 2020, and the feasibility study is likely to be completed within 8 months.
