= Pirwadhai Mor Flyover and Underpass =

- Islamabad Capital Territory
- Interactive map of Pirwadhai Mor Flyover and Underpass

Location
- Rawalpindi, Punjab, Pakistan
- Coordinates: 33.61479991362977°N 72.99372259091163°E
- Roads at junction: Peshawar Road; I. J. Principal Road

Construction
- Type: Flyover and Underpass
- Lanes: 2 x 2
- Constructed: by National Logistics Cell and Habib Construction Services
- Opened: 16 March 2013

The Pirwadhai Mor Flyover and Underpass is a flyover and underpass in Rawalpindi in Punjab, Pakistan. Its construction started on 23 October 2012, and it was completed on 16 March 2013.

The flyover was built at Peshawar Road, where the traffic from Peshawar heads towards Saddar. While the underpass connects I.J. Principal Road with Peshawar Road, the flyover facilitates thousands of commuters coming in and going out of Rawalpindi and Islamabad, and the residents of the densely populated localities of the twin cities daily.

The length of the two-lane underpass is 436 m while the three-lane bridge is 380 m long, and the length of ramps ranges from 95-96 m. The cost of the project was Rs. 1.45 billion.
