= Defence Housing Authority Valley =

Subdivision in Pakistan

Defence Housing Authority Valley (abbreviated DHA Valley) is a real estate development project of Defence Housing Authority, Islamabad.

== Details ==
DHA Valley is a joint venture between Defence Housing Authority Islamabad–Rawalpindi, Bahria Town, and Habib Rafiq. The plan includes a secure community with parks, utilities, commercial shopping, schools, mosques, and a hospital. The project's master plan was designed by the California-based company OJMR Architects. Habib Rafiq is responsible for the transportation infrastructure, while construction of DHA Homes was awarded to the Turkish company AREA. The master plan includes the following projects DHA Valley, DHA Valley (Overseas Block), DHA Homes and DHA Commercial Avenue The project launched in November 2008 and should have been completed by the end of 2014. Plots will be given to alloties in December 2022 as per new plan given by administration after paying up fee of Development charges.

== Controversies ==
=== Kamran Kayani ===
Kamran Kayani, brother of former Chief of Army Staff Ashfaq Parvez Kayani, is allegedly involved in a number of land scams including DHA Valley. The corruption watchdog National Accountability Bureau (NAB) investigated Kamran Kayani and later issued his arrest warrants.

=== Corruption allegations ===
On 2 February 2011, a complaint was lodged with National Accountability Bureau (NAB) against the management of DHA Valley. The complainant Lt. Col. Tariq Kamal accused the management of DHA Valley of embezzlement in sale, development, and purchase of land in the subdivision. On the directions of Supreme Court of Pakistan, NAB submitted a list of 179 cases before the court. The list also included the DHA Valley case. Later, the same list was uploaded on NAB's website. The status of the DHA Valley case in NAB is "inquiry under progress", as of 27 January 2017.

=== Dadhocha Dam ===
On 3 August 2015, a report was submitted to the Supreme Court on behalf of the Punjab Irrigation Department. The submitted report assured the Supreme Court that Dadhocha Dam would be built at the original site. The original site of Dadhocha dam had been included in the master plan of DHA Valley. On 27 January 2016, the district administration of Rawalpindi told the Punjab Irrigation Department to start constructing the stalled Dadhocha Dam to end its tussle with the Defence, Islamabad-Rawalpindi.

== See also ==
- Defence Housing Authority
- Bahria Town
- Capital Development Authority
- Developments in Islamabad
