= Murree Road =

Road in Pakistan

Murree Road سڑکِ مری
- Reza Shah Pahlavi Road (since 1960s)
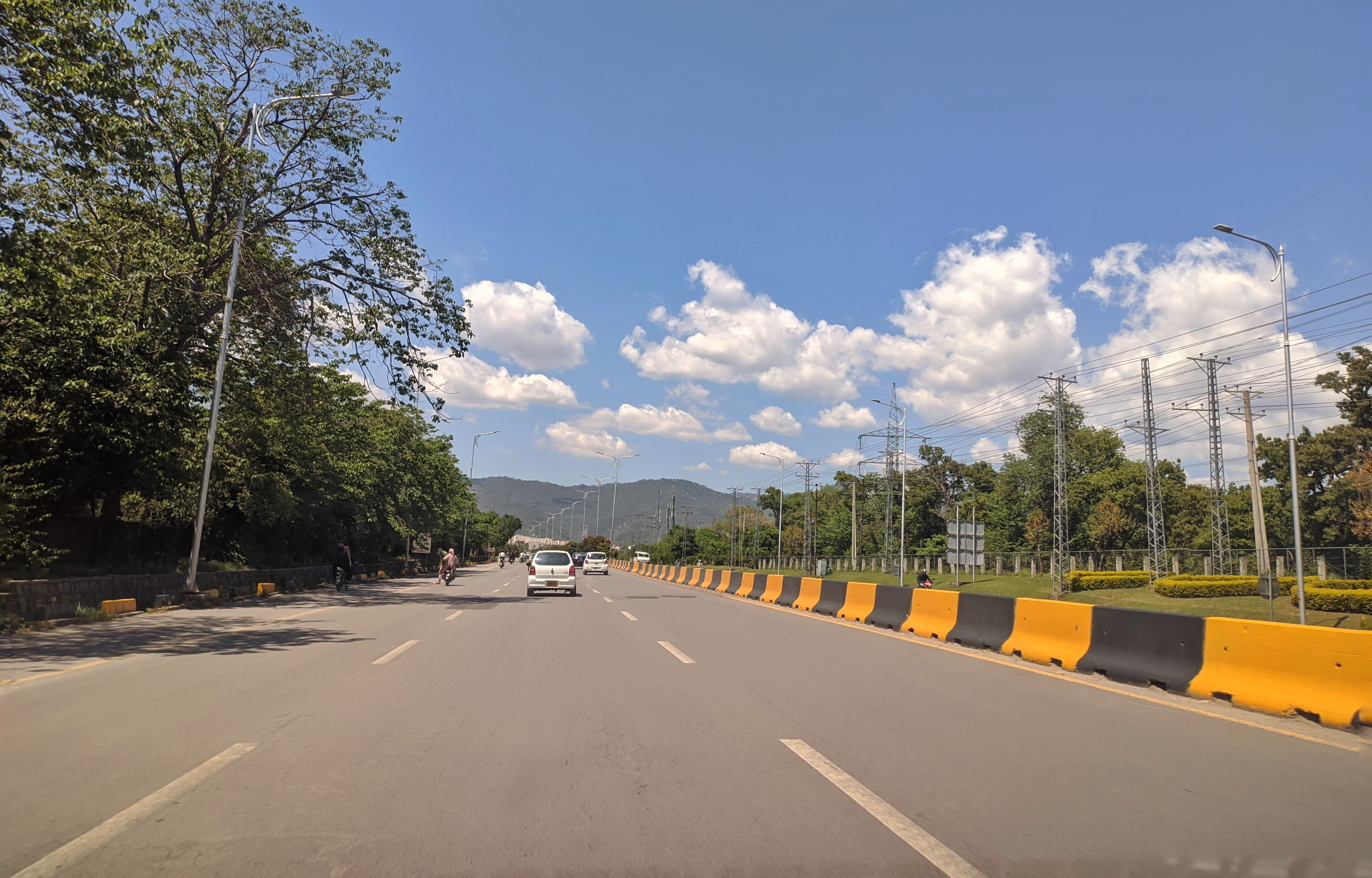
- View of Murree road towards Kashmir Chowk in Islamabad

Route information
- Length: 28 km (17 mi)

Major junctions
- North end: E75 (Diverts to Kashmir road and Murree expressway at Satra Meel Chowk)
- Kashmir Chowk; Rawal Dam Interchange; Faizabad Interchange; 6th road Flyover; Chandni Chowk Flyover; Committee Chowk
- South end: T.M Chowk (Continues as Sharif road after crossing Peshawar road)

Location
- Country: Pakistan

Highway system
- Roads in Pakistan

Murree Road (Urdu: سڑکِ مری , romanized: sarhak-e-murri), formerly known as Reza Shah Pahlavi Road, is a major road that runs from Islamabad and Rawalpindi to Murree in Pakistan. It passes through Rawalpindi's downtown area, and has been a hotspot for various political and social events.

== Names ==
It was originally named Raza Shah Pehlavi Road in the 1960s, after Mohammad Reza Pahlavi, the last Shah of Iran, who was the first head of state to visit Pakistan. However, it has always been known as Murree Road since it eventually led to the nearby hill station of Murree.

On 20 May 2008, Prime Minister Yousaf Raza Gillani announced that the federal government had decided to rename the road after Benazir Bhutto, who was assassinated at the nearby Liaqat National Bagh on 27 December 2007. However, the city officials claimed that the change of name had not been notified, and was, therefore, not official. In spite of this, residents and shopkeepers started referring it with its new name.

== Route ==
Nala Lai is located along the road in Rawalpindi. History describes that Nala Lai's water was pure enough to wash clothes, but now it has become polluted with waste water from all sources including factories and houses. Liaquat National Bagh, famous place for political gatherings as well as being the site of the assassinations of two former prime ministers and bystanders, is also located along the Murree Road.

Nine Rawalpindi-Islamabad Metrobus stations also lie along Murree Road.

== Gallery ==
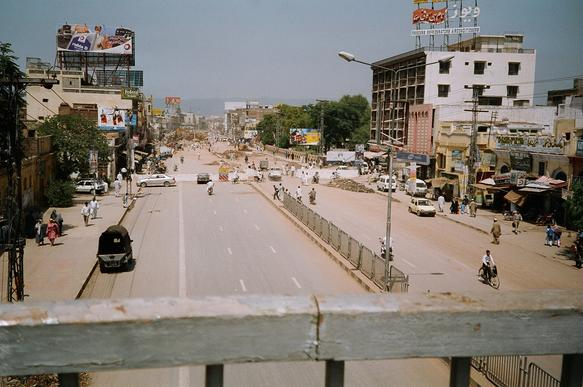
The Murree Road in Rawalpindi, as viewed from a footbridge while the construction work on Committee Chowk Underpass is being carried out in the background

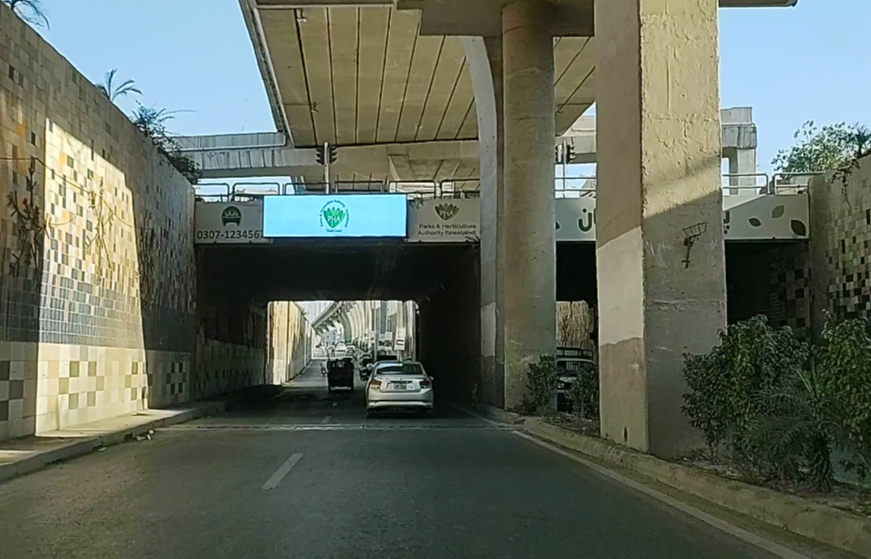
Committee Chowk Underpass with the elevated track of Rawalpindi-Islamabad Metrobus visible above

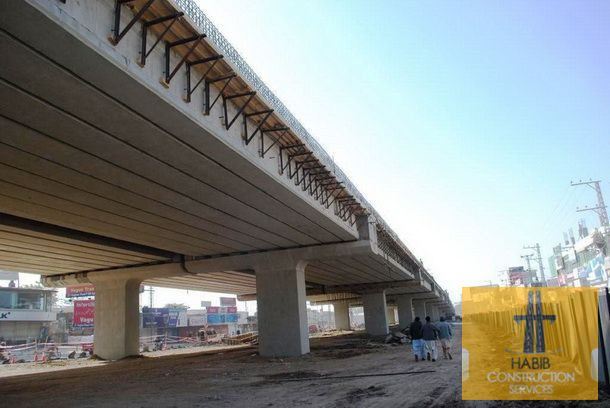
Chandni Chowk Fly over

== See also ==
- Lai Expressway
