= Liaquat National Bagh =

Public park in Rawalpindi, Pakistan

Liaqat National Bagh
- لیاقت باغ
- Interactive map of Liaqat National Bagh
- Type: Urban park
- Location: Murree Road, Rawalpindi, Punjab, Pakistan
- Coordinates: 33°36′22″N 73°03′52″E
- Area: 4.0 ha
- Operator: PHA Rawalpindi
- Status: Operational
- Public transit: Metrobus: Liaquat Bagh Station

Liaqat National Bagh, formerly known as Company Bagh, usually just referred to as Liaqat Bagh, is a park on Murree Road in the city of Rawalpindi, Punjab, Pakistan. It is close to 'Arya Mohalla' and Government Gordon College, which are two well-known residential and commercial areas of Rawalpindi.

== History ==
It was founded as Company Bagh (East India Company's Garden) by East India Company, but was renamed Liaqat National Bagh after the assassination of Liaquat Ali Khan in 1951. It is known as a place for political gatherings and for speeches. Benazir Bhutto was assassinated on 27 December 2007 while leaving an election rally at the park and a suicide bomb was detonated immediately following the shooting.

Even in the 20th century, this park was a ground for wrestlers.

On 1 March 2016, a mass gathering of people for the funeral prayer of Mumtaz Qadri, who assassinated Punjab Governor Salman Taseer, was also seen here after Qadri's execution. This funeral prayer was attended by an estimated 100,000 people, the majority of whom were clerics and youth.

== See also ==
- List of parks and gardens in Pakistan
