= Allama Iqbal Park, Rawalpindi =

Public park in Rawalpindi, Pakistan

Allama Iqbal Park
- علامہ اقبال پارک
- Interactive map of Allama Iqbal Park
- Type: Urban park
- Location: Murree Road, Shamsabad, Rawalpindi, Punjab, Pakistan
- Coordinates: 33.636°N 73.041°E
- Area: 28 acres (11 ha)
- Operator: Parks and Horticulture Authority Rawalpindi
- Status: Open

Allama Iqbal Park, formerly known as Nawaz Sharif Park, is a public urban park in Rawalpindi, Punjab, Pakistan. It is administered by the Parks and Horticulture Authority (PHA) Rawalpindi and is located on Murree Road near the Rawalpindi Cricket Stadium.

The park is spread over an area of 28 acres and is one of the largest public park in Rawalpindi.

== History ==
It was inaugurated by Prime Minister Nawaz Sharif during his second term in office and was initially named after him.

In April 2016, police assessed the site as unsafe and the PHA temporarily closed the park pending security measures.

In August 2019, the PHA Rawalpindi board renamed the park as Allama Iqbal Park.

In October 2025, the PHA submitted development schemes for the 2025–2026 fiscal year, which included proposals for a major remodeling of the park. Surveying and design planning for these renovations commenced in December 2025.

== Facilities ==
The park functions as a recreational space featuring jogging tracks and children's play areas. In April 2018, an electronic library was established on the premises, providing digital access for students and the general public.

The site is utilized for civic programming, including horticultural exhibitions. It also serves as a location for government-administered price relief markets. Temporary "Sasta Ramazan Bazaars" and wholesale commodity markets were established at or near the park in May 2019, March 2024, and August 2024.

Due to its proximity to the Rawalpindi Cricket Stadium, the park is subject to periodic closures for security purposes during international cricket matches, as occurred in March 2022.
