= Lai Nullah =

Stream in Rawalpindi, Pakistan

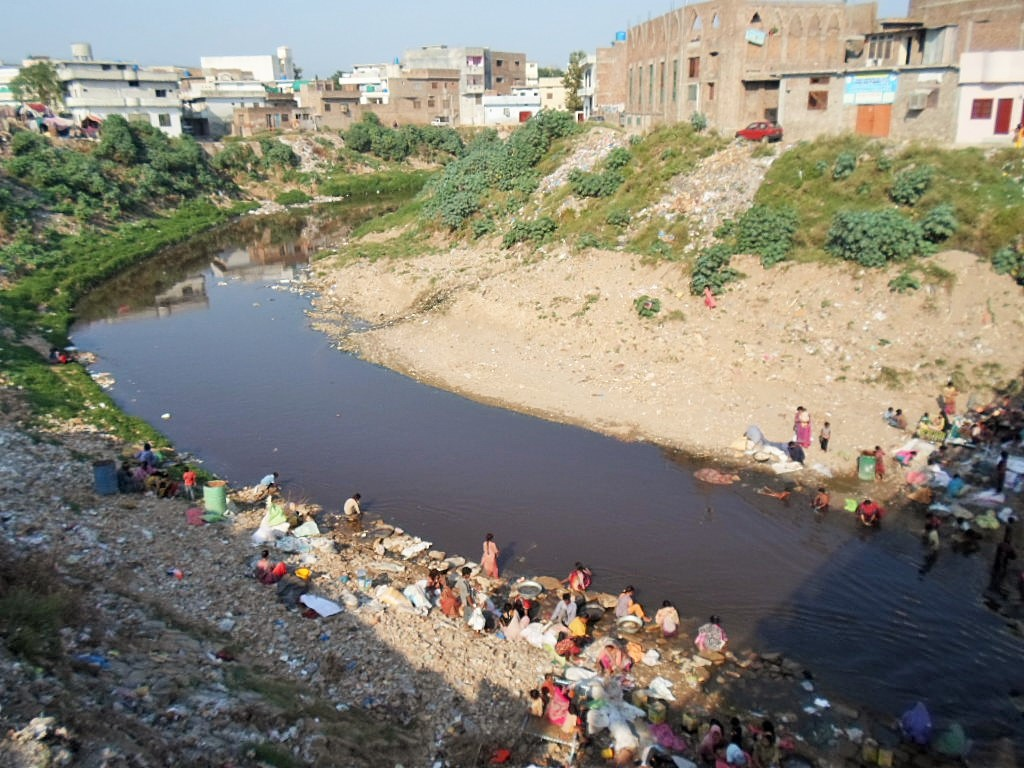
A view of Lai Nullah from Sheikh Rasheed bridge Rawalpindi

Lai Nullah (Urdu: نالہ لئی), commonly called Nullah Lai, is a rain water fed natural stream flowing through the city of Rawalpindi. Every monsoon season the stream floods after being fed by its catchment basin in the Margalla Hills bordering Islamabad, Pakistan.

The Lai Nullah Basin has a catchment area of 234.8 km^{2}, extending to the twin cities of Islamabad and Rawalpindi.

A record level of 620 mm of rainfall fell in Islamabad, Pakistan one in just 10 hours brought in its wake huge urban storm flooding in the famous Lai Nullah flowing through the twin cities on 23 July 2001., Islamabad and Rawalpindi are situated along the Margallah hills. In this paper severe rainfall spell 4–9 July 2008 is analyzed. Our main focus is the flooding which occurred on 5 July due to 104mm rainfall received in only 100 minutes; 162 mm rainfall was recorded only in 5 hours at PMD Headquarters Islamabad. Densely populated low-lying areas along Lai Nullah faced flood like situation causing massive destruction of property and life. Three people died in the flash flood. It was the heaviest short period rainfall in last six years, reminding the cloud burst of 23 July 2001. Temporal coincidence of July 2001 and July 2008 shows that both the events occurred between 00-09 UTC. The Nai Nullah river has six major tributaries, three originating in the foothills of Islamabad in the higher plain area; it then flows down through the lower lying city of Rawalpindi, where another three tributaries join the river.

Lai Nullah starts from the IJP Road in Islamabad at the administrative boundary between the twin cities of Rawalpindi and Islamabad. Apart from flow from Islamabad area, 11 main drains of Rawalpindi City also contributes to Nullah Lai. REF RDA DOC

The Lai Nullah combined with its tributaries such as Saidpur Kasi, Kanitwali, Badarwali Kasi and Tenawali Kasi, originating from Margala Hills enter in Rawalpindi city from CDA area at IJ principal Road and Khayaban-e- Sir Syed. The additional tributaries including Niki Lai, Dhoke Hassu Nullah, Dhoke Ellahi Bakhash and PAF Colony Nullah join the main stream of Lai Nullah within Rawalpindi City. REF RDA DOC

== Physical features ==
=== Climate ===
The climate of the Lai Nullah Basin area is classified as “Subtropical Triple Season Moderate Climate Zone”, which is characterized by single rainfall season from July to September and its moderating influence on temperature. The case Study area has hot summers and cold winters. In June the daily maximum temperature reaches to 40 °C, while the daily minimum temperature falls near to 0 °C in December and January. Between July and September, the temperature is slightly moderate due to humidity. The case Study area receives rains in all seasons but monsoon rain is pronounced and constitutes a definite rain season but monsoon between July and September. The total rainfall during the rain season is about 600 mm, accounting to 60% of the annual rainfall of about 1,000mm.

=== Topography ===
The Basin could be broadly divided into the following four areas in view of topography:

i) Margalla Hill Range: It stands behind Islamabad City area as a wall, which forms the North boundary of the Lai Nullah Basin. The foot of the Margalla range stands at elevations of about 620 m, while top of the mountain, which is only 3 km from the foot is at about 1,200m. Among several, four major tributaries originate from here. They are Saidpur Kas, Tenawali Kas, Bedarawali Kas and Johd Kas and are as steep as nearly 10%.

ii) The Higher Plain: The Higher Plain expands over the built-up area of Islamabad city with a gradual slope from North to South.

iii) The Lower Plain: The Lower Plain is the upper part of Rawalpindi area upstream of Chaklala Bridge. The area forms a bowl-shaped topography.

iv) The Valley area in the North to South direction. After Chaklala Bridge, the topography changes very much a definite valley. The river/Nullah turns steeper with many cascades, fully down to Soan River, which is a tributary river of mighty river Indus- the largest river among major rivers in Pakistan.

=== Hydrology ===
In the jurisdiction are of Islamabad the river system is composed of three major tributaries, namely (i) Saidpur Kas, (ii) Tenawali Kas and (iii) Bedarawali Kas. They originate from the Margalla Hills and flow into the mainstream of Lai N ullah just upstream from Kattarian Bridge, at I.J. Principal Road forming the administrative boundary between Islamabad and Rawalpindi.

Below Kattarian Bridge, in the jurisdiction area of Rawalpindi, the main stream meets other three major tributaries; namely (i) Nikki Lai, (ii) Pir Wadhai Kas and (iii) Dhok Ratta Nullah one after another, then flows down through the center of Rawalpindi City and finally pours into Soan River. In addition to these major tributaries, there are six (6) other tributaries or drainage channels/sewage channels, which join the main stream between the confluences of Dhok Ratta Nullah and Soan River.

=== Geology ===
In the upper reaches, Lai Nullah cuts through the surficial deposits, which generally consists of Potwar loessic silt. In deposits forming a thick mantle over. In lower reaches of Lai Nullah, the surficial deposits are found to be present directly over older formation, where the Lai Conglomerate has been removed by degradation.

The Lai Nullah Basin receives heavy rainfall averaging 500 mm in the monsoon season (July September) every year leading to heavy flood discharge. During the 1944 - 2004 period, a total of 19 floods had occurred averaging a flood every 3 years. On July 23, 2001, an unprecedented rainfall occurred over Islamabad Rawalpindi resulting in 620 mm of rain in a span of about 10 hours. The flood had caused the worst damage in the basin including death of 74 people and the complete or partial destruction of about 3,000 houses.

== Flooding ==
Lai Nullah – Extreme Flood Years

Year	Date
1944	August 13
1957	
1966	July 31
1970	
1972	
1976	
1977	
1978	
1981	
1982	August 10
1985	
1988	
1990	
1994	July 3
1995	July 24
1996	July 29
1997	August 27
2001	July 23
2002	August 13
2003	August 3
2008	July 6
2012	September 4
2013	August 13

Extreme flood years were 1981, 1988, 1997 and 2001, the latter having been the largest among the recorded events (considered as a national disaster). The intensity and amount of rainfall caused the water level of Lai Nullah and its tributaries to rise remarkably and flooding Rawalpindi (where the damages were several times larger than in Islamabad). A total of 74 people died, about 400,000 people were affected, 742 cattle head perished, 1,087 houses were completely and 2,448 partially damaged. Estimates indicate a damage/loss of more than US$250 million to infrastructure, Government and private property.

== See also ==
- Lai Expressway
