= Lai Expressway =

Proposed road in Pakistan

Lai Expressway لئی بزرگرہ

Route information
- Maintained by Rawalpindi Development Authority
- Length: 17 km (11 mi)

Major junctions
- From: IJP Road
- To: GT Road

Location
- Country: Pakistan

Highway system
- Roads in Pakistan

Lai Expressway is a 17km long proposed alternative road to connect Islamabad's IJP Road with GT Road. The initial cost of the project is estimated at PKR.70 billion. It will be built with the participation of government and private institutions. The Asian Development Bank will provide 10 billion rupees for the installation of sewage treatment plant associated with this project.

== See also ==
- Islamabad Expressway
- Expressways of Pakistan
