= Fayzabad Interchange =

Cloverleaf interchange in Islamabad, Pakistan

Fayzabad Interchange فیض آباد ادلا بدلی
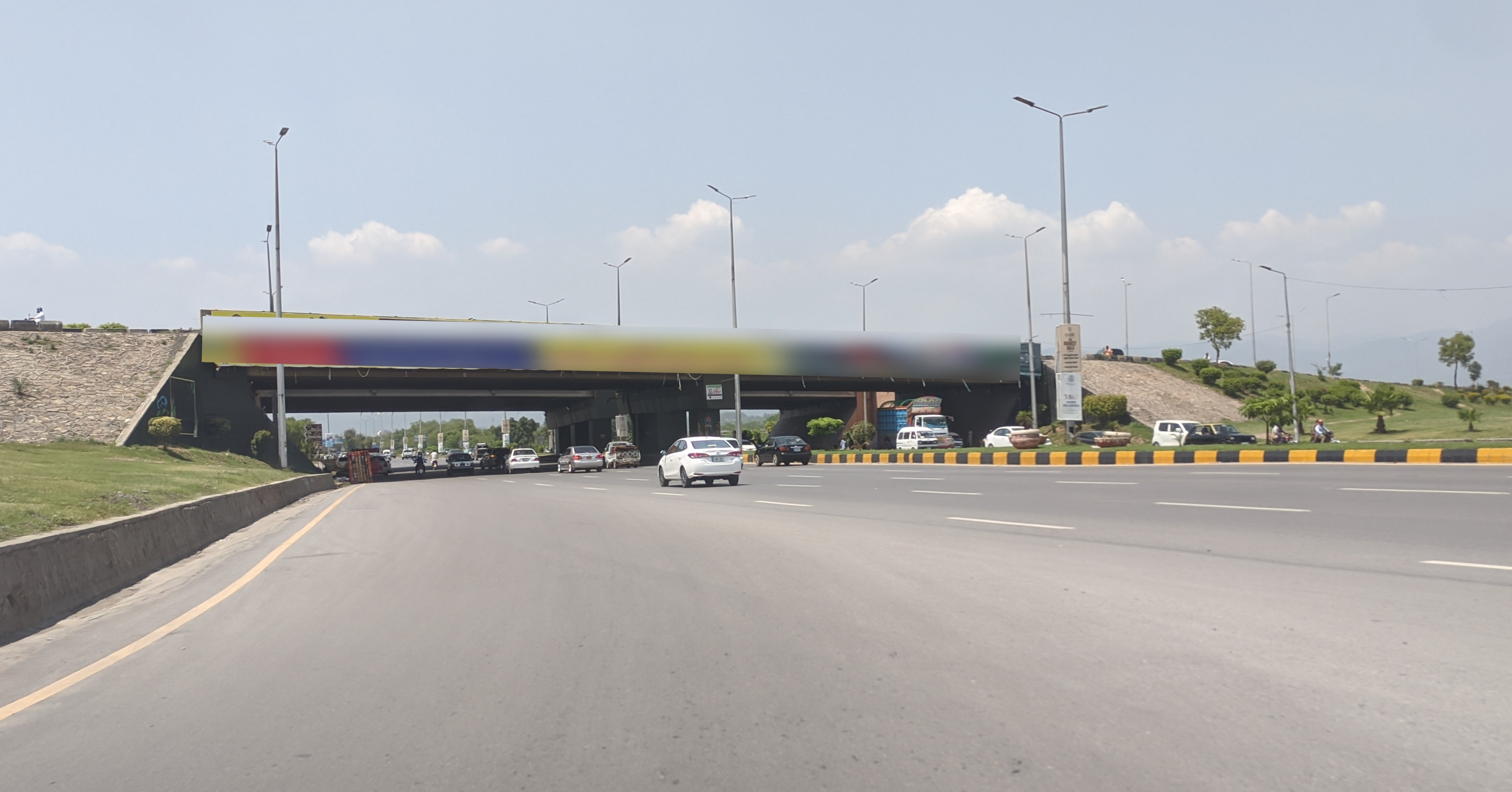
- View of Fayzabad Interchange bypass bridge from Islamabad Expressway

Location
- Islamabad and Rawalpindi
- Coordinates: 33°39′52″N 73°5′13″E
- Roads at junction: Murree Road; Islamabad Highway

Construction
- Type: Cloverleaf interchange
- Opened: January 1998; 27 years ago

Fayzabad Interchange (Urdu: فیض آباد ادلا بدلی) is a cloverleaf interchange which serves as a junction between Islamabad Highway and Murree Road in Islamabad, Pakistan.

Constructed by NESPAK at a cost of Rs 130 million (£745,000), the interchange was completed in January 1998, making it the first modern cloverleaf interchange in Pakistan. Over 100,000 vehicles use this interchange daily and serves a major entry and exit point to Islamabad and Rawalpindi. The interchange is only a few cloverleaf interchanges in the world where three roads have been joined rather than two, linking the Islamabad Expressway, Murree Road, and the Karnal Sher Khan Shaheed Road.
