= Defence Housing Authority Islamabad–Rawalpindi =

Residential neighbourhood in Islamabad, Pakistan

Defence, Islamabad
- Location: Islamabad, Pakistan
- Groundbreaking: May 1992
- Website: www.dhai-r.com.pk

Companies
- Developer: Habib Rafiq (Pvt.) Limited
- Owner: Pakistan Armed Forces

Technical details
- Size: 50 km2

The Defence Housing Authority, Islamabad–Rawalpindi (DHAI-R) (Urdu: اداره خانه سازی ڈیفنس اسلام آباد-راولپنڈی) is an affluent residential neighbourhood or a gated community located within Islamabad–Rawalpindi metropolitan area of Pakistan. The neighbourhood is divided into five parts and straddles the Punjab provincial border. This neighbourhood was primarily established for military personnel in 1992 by the Armed Forces of Pakistan Welfare Department, however, currently both civilian and military families reside there. Today, DHA Islamabad–Rawalpindi serves as one of the twin cities' most posh residential neighbourhoods.

== Subdivisions ==
Defence Phase I	Most ideally located phase of Defence, positioned between Potohar Avenue and Bahria Town Islamabad.
Defence Phase II	Largest of all subdivisions, located between Potohar Avenue and Expressway.
Defence Phase III	Previously Bahria Serene City, located east of Bahria VIII.
Defence Phase IV	Located adjacent to Orchard Area, DHA Phase 1 along Soan River.
Defence Phase V	Located on Expressway.
Defence Valley, Islamabad	On hold, located adjacent to Defence II on Expressway.

== Administration ==
Defence is headed by a serving brigadier of the Pakistan Army under the Welfare and Rehabilitation Directorate.

== Locations ==
=== Defence Phase I ===
Defence I is located within the Islamabad–Rawalpindi metropolitan area between Potohar Avenue and Bahria Town Phase VII & VIII. On its southwest, it borders the Soan River. Just beyond Phase I, the larger area known as Sector F (formerly Phase 1 Extension) spans 8.47 km^{2}, making DHA Phase I one of the city's most sought-after addresses.

=== Defence Phase II ===
Located near the Kahuta Triangle, with Potohar Avenue on its south end and Islamabad Expressway on its North. The project was commenced in February 1994.

=== Defence Valley ===
Launched on 18 August 2008, DHA Valley is located adjacent to Defence Phase II.

== Commercial zones ==
All phases have commercial zones.

== Real estate ==
DHA is regarded as one of the most expensive communities in the twin cities of Islamabad and Rawalpindi. Real estate in Pakistan underwent a boom during the early and mid 2000s when Overseas Pakistanis started sending substantial amounts of their savings back home. As of 2019, statistics reveal that an average 418 square metre plot in DHA Islamabad is priced between ₨ 20–25 million. Pakistan's leading property portal "Zameen" reported in February 2013 that property for rent and sales in Defence have performed phenomenally well.

== See also ==
- Defence Housing Authority, Karachi
- Defence Housing Authority
