= Islamabad–Rawalpindi =

Metropolitan area in Pakistan

Islamabad-Rawalpindi Metropolitan Area اسلام آباد-راولپنڈی میٹروپولیٹن علاقہ
- Metropolitan area
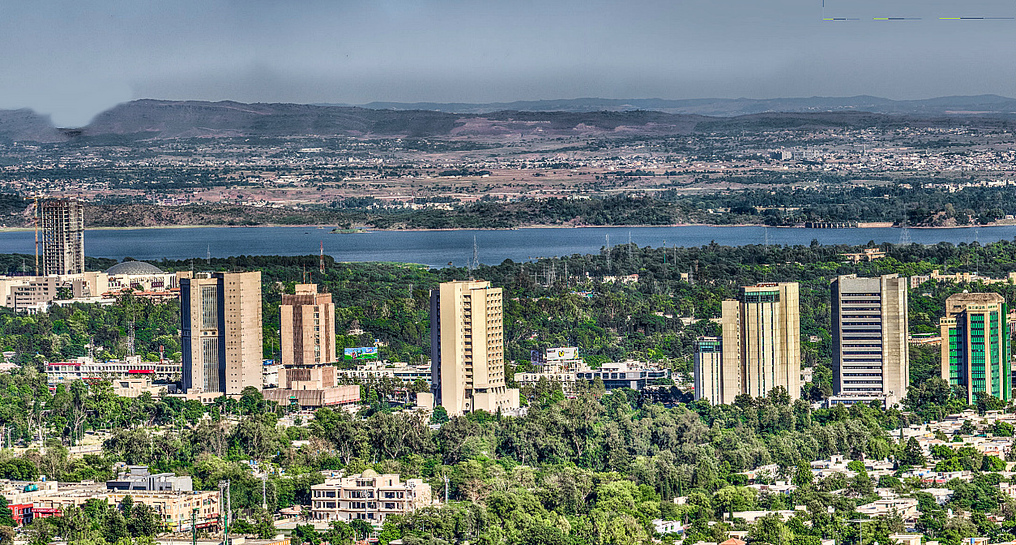
- Skyline of Islamabad
- Interactive map of Islamabad-Rawalpindi Metropolitan Area
- Coordinates: 33.64835585418554°N 73.06637710972826°E
- Country: Pakistan
- Region: Punjab (Note: The area of Islamabad Capital Territory is part of the Punjab region, despite being administratively separate from the Province of Punjab since 1967.)
- Subdivisions: Islamabad Capital Territory; Province of Punjab
- Districts: Islamabad Capital Territory; Rawalpindi District
- Cities: Islamabad; Rawalpindi

Area
  - Total: 1,385.5 km^{2} (534.9 sq mi)
- Rawalpindi: 479 km^{2} Islamabad: 906.5 km^{2}

Population (2023)
  - Total: 5,721,475
  - Density: 4,129.5/km^{2} (10,695/sq mi)
- Rawalpindi Metropolitan: 3,357,612; Islamabad Metropolitan: 2,363,863
- Time zone: Pakistan Standard Time

The Islamabad–Rawalpindi metropolitan area, (Note: Punjabi, Urdu: اسلام آباد-راولپنڈی میٹروپولیٹن علاقہ) commonly referred to as Islamabad–Rawalpindi or the Twin Cities, is the third-largest metropolitan area of Pakistan, after Karachi, and Lahore. With a population of over 5.7 million, it is the second-most populous metropolitan area in the Punjab region, the largest in northern Punjab, and third in the entire country. It consists of the twin cities of Islamabad and Rawalpindi; administratively within the Islamabad Capital Territory and the province of Punjab.

The area includes the Pothohar Plateau in northern Punjab, with and the colonial-era city of Rawalpindi, as well as the modern planned city of Islamabad. The region received a major boom with the construction of Islamabad as the capital city of Pakistan in the 1960s.

== Geography ==
Islamabad and Rawalpindi are located in the Potohar Plateau in the north of Punjab, against the backdrop of the Margalla Hills.

== Economy ==
Islamabad contributes 1% to the gross domestic product of the nation, despite comprising only 0.8% of the total population. Islamabad Stock Exchange was founded in 1989 and is the third-ranked stock exchange in Pakistan after the Karachi Stock Exchange and Lahore Stock Exchange. The exchange had 118 members with 104 corporate bodies and 18 individual members. The stock exchange averages a daily turnover of over a million shares.

As of 2012, Islamabad LTU (Large Tax Unit) was responsible for Rs 371 billion in tax revenue, which amounts to 20% of all the revenue collected by Federal Board of Revenue. Islamabad has seen an expansion in information and communications technology with the addition two Software Technology Parks, which house numerous national and foreign technological and information technology companies. The tech parks are located in Evacuee Trust Complex and Awami Markaz. Awami Markaz houses 36 IT companies while Evacuee Trust houses 29 companies.

The economy of Rawalpindi and the surrounding district has a diverse industrial base, but remains mainly service based. According to the general survey of industry conducted by the Directorate of Industries and Mineral Development Punjab, there are 939 industrial units operating in the district. This district is not famous for industrial goods like other districts. The progress has been mostly in the private sector. The existing industrial units provide employment to about 35,000 people, i.e., about 1.6% of the district's population is directly employed in large, medium, and small industrial units. The Technical/Vocational Training Institute operating in the district turns out about 1,974 technicians/artisans annually, trained in engineering, air conditioning, drafting, metallurgy, welding, automated knitting, telecom and commerce, etc. Jinnah Road, formerly known as City Saddar Road, is one of the busiest business markets. It could be considered as the business headquarters of northern Pakistan; including retailers, wholesalers, distributors, and manufacturers. There are more than nine banks on the road, and more are expected to open soon. This shows how important Jinnah Road is to the country. Being an expensive city, the prices of most fruits, vegetable, and poultry items increased in Islamabad during the years 2015–2020.

== Infrastructure ==
The metropolitan area is connected by a network of highways to the rest of the country. Within the area, the Islamabad Highway and Srinagar Highway provide the primary link between Islamabad and Rawalpindi. The area is divided by the Grand Trunk Road, which connects the region with Lahore and Peshawar. The area is connected to the rest of the country via the freeway network of Pakistan. The M-1 freeway connects in the north to Peshawar, while the M-2 freeway connects it southwards to Lahore, from where the network eventually connects it to the port city of Karachi.

The area is also connected to the Pakistan Railways' national railway network. The area is served by Islamabad International Airport, which is one of the largest airports in Pakistan. It has a capacity of serving 9 million passengers per year, which can be increased to up to 25 million if required. The Civil Aviation Authority has plans to acquire more land for the development of a third runway. It is one of the two airports in Pakistan capable of landing the Airbus A380 along with the New Gwadar International Airport which is also capable of landing the Airbus A380

The Rawalpindi-Islamabad Metrobus is a 24 km (14.9 mi) bus rapid transit system that serves the twin cities of Rawalpindi and Islamabad within the larger metropolitan area. It uses dedicated bus lanes for all of its routes, covering 24 bus stations.

== Politics ==
The capital of Pakistan is Islamabad, which serves as the seat of the federal government and is the countries political center. Pakistan's military headquarters are located in Rawalpindi, which has been important historically. Rawalpindi also temporarily served as the federal capital when Islamabad was being built in the 1960s, to replace Karachi as the capital.

== Demographics ==
Urban Area	Province	Population	Type
Islamabad	Islamabad Capital Territory	1,014,825	Capital city
Golra Sharif	Islamabad Capital Territory	143,000	Town
Nilore	Islamabad Capital Territory	132,000	Town
Defence	Islamabad Capital Territory (part), Punjab (part)	-	Gated community
Rawalpindi	Punjab	2,098,231	Major city
Bahria Town	Punjab	120,000	Gated community
Wah Cantonment	Punjab	350,000	Garrison Town /Cantonment Board
Taxila	Punjab	677,951	Town
Gujar Khan	Punjab	678,503	Town
Murree	Punjab	233,471	Hill station
Kahuta	Punjab	220,000	Town

== See also ==
- List of twin towns and sister cities in Pakistan
