= Pir Wadhai =

- Location within Pakistan
- Coordinates: 33.36°N 72.59°E
- Country: Pakistan
- Province: Punjab
- District: Rawalpindi District
- Time zone: UTC+5 (PST)
- Postal code: 46350

Pir Wadhai, is a town and a Union Council Of Rawalpindi City in Rawalpindi District, Pakistan. It has the largest public intercity bus terminal where buses are operated to across every corner of Pakistan.

== Banks and post office ==
- MCB Bank Limited, (Muslim Commercial Bank) Aziz Bhatti road (Old name: Clyde Road)
- National Bank.
- Post office, bus stop
