= National Logistics Corporation =

Pakistani state-owned logistics company

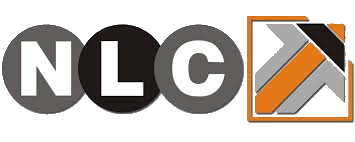
- Company type: Private
- Industry: Logistics; Freight transport
- Founded: July 20, 1978; 47 years ago
- Headquarters: Rawalpindi, Punjab, Pakistan
- Area served: Pakistan; Afghanistan (formerly)
- Key people: Maj Gen. Farrukh Shahzad Rao (director-general)
- Services: Logistics, freight forwarding, dry ports, border terminals, engineering, construction, tolling, express freight trains, polymers, and sea freight
- Number of employees: 8,000
- Website: www.nlc.com.pk

The National Logistics Corporation (Urdu: نیشنل لاجسٹکس کارپوریشن), formerly known as the National Logistics Cell, is a Pakistani state-owned logistics company based in Rawalpindi, Pakistan. It is considered as the logistics arm of Pakistan Army and operates under its indirect control.

As of 2011, NLC was responsible for transporting approximately 50 percent of Pakistan's domestic crude oil, amounting to about 76,000 barrels per day.

== History ==
The National Logistics Corporation was founded following the 1977–1978 wheat crisis in Pakistan, due to insufficient railway capabilities to transport wheat from the Karachi seaport inland. Initially, the Pakistan Army was asked to address the crisis, which ultimately led to the formation of the NLC as an independent entity. Later, it was given the role of supplying military equipment to Mujahideen fighting the Soviet Union during the presidency of Muhammad Zia-ul-Haq. During this period, NLC also acquired the freight business of Pakistan Railways. In the early stages of the Afghan refugee crisis, the NLC used the Pakistan Army's transport capabilities to provide logistical support to approximately three million Afghan refugees between 1982 and 1989.

In the fiscal year 1994-1995, the NLC was allocated approximately Rs 245 million by the Government of Pakistan to invest in stock markets and bonds, aimed at funding vehicle replacements and other infrastructural developments. The government was the sole financer of the NLC's infrastructure development during this period.

By 2004, the NLC had evolved into a major logistics organization, boasting a carriage capacity of 50,000 tons of dry cargo and 9 million liters of fluid cargo, with a fleet of 2,000 vehicles. Its assets were valued at around Rs 5 billion. Since its establishment, NLC had also diversified into the construction industry, undertaking various military and civilian infrastructure projects in Pakistan, including roads and bridges.

In July 2011, the Government of Pakistan allowed the NLC to participate in the bidding process for the acquisition of a state-owned construction company, which was a change from its original charter. The decision was made to refocus the NLC and align its activities with its statutory framework. The NLC sought to acquire international assets owned by the National Power Construction Company.

As of 2011, NLC was responsible for transporting approximately 50 percent of Pakistan's domestic crude oil, amounting to about 76,000 barrels per day.

In 2014, NLC was awarded the contract to construct the Rawalpindi section of Rawalpindi-Islamabad Metrobus at 1.04 per cent higher than the estimated cost.

== Controversies ==
In 2010, a corruption scandal was unearthed that involved two Pakistan Army generals, (Maj Gen Khalid Zaheer Akhtar and Lt Gen Muhammad Afzal), and caused a loss of Rs. 1.8 billion to the company through speculative investments between 2004 and 2008. In 2015, both of them were convicted by the military court of Pakistan.
