= Rawalpindi Development Authority =

Pakistani municipality organisation

- راولپنڈی ڈویلپمنٹ اتھارٹی
- Formation: May 1989
- Headquarters: Rawalpindi
- Chairman: Minister For Finance, Government of the Punjab
- Parent organization: Government of Punjab
- Website: www.rda.gop.pk

The Rawalpindi Development Authority (RDA) (Urdu: راولپنڈی ڈویلپمنٹ اتھارٹی) is a government corporation responsible for overseeing municipal and town Services in Rawalpindi, a city in the Punjab, Pakistan. Established in May 1989, the RDA aims to improve, develop, and implement the city's growth and development plans.

== History ==
Rawalpindi Development Authority (RDA) was established in May 1989 under the Act of the Development of cities by the Punjab Government. In 1976, an autonomous governing body replaced Rawalpindi Improvement Trust (RIT) with Rawalpindi Development Authority (RDA). The Rawalpindi Development Authority started functioning in March 1992.

== Purpose ==
Rawalpindi Development Authority seeks to be a principal planning, development and improvements organization in Rawalpindi city. The aim of the Rawalpindi Development Authority (RDA) is facilitating and enabling provision and improvement of metropolis-wide development works, facilities, services and incentives for Residential and Commercial outlets in Rawalpindi city.

== Territory ==
Rawalpindi Development Authority is spread over the Rawal Town and 64 other Revenue and Land Estates of Potohar Town, except Cantonment Board. The controlled area of Rawalpindi Development Authority is around 311 km^{2} (120 sq mi).

== Governing body ==
The members of the Governing Body for the Rawalpindi Development Authority consist of the following.

- Finance Minister, Govt of the Punjab.
- Chairman P & D Board.
- Secretary of the Finance Department.
- Secretary of the LG and RD Department.
- Secretary of the HUD and PHE Department.
- Commissioner Rawalpindi
- Managing Director WASA Rawalpindi
- Mayor of the Rawalpindi
- District Coordination Officer

== Directorates ==
There are four directorates for the Rawalpindi Development Authority.

- Directorate of the Metropolitan and Traffic Engineering
- Directorate of the Land and Estate Management.
- Directorate of the Engineering.
- Directorate of the Administration and Finance.

== Services ==
There are the main and prominent incentives and services from Rawalpindi Development Authority.

- Building and used Land Control and Urban areas development plan.
- Launch new and state of the art housing slandered schemes.
- Preservation and improvement for the Green-friendly and public-friendly environment.
- Development of Estate and Land Management.
