= Islamabad Expressway =

Major road in Islamabad, Pakistan

- Islamabad Highway اسلام آباد گزرگاہ
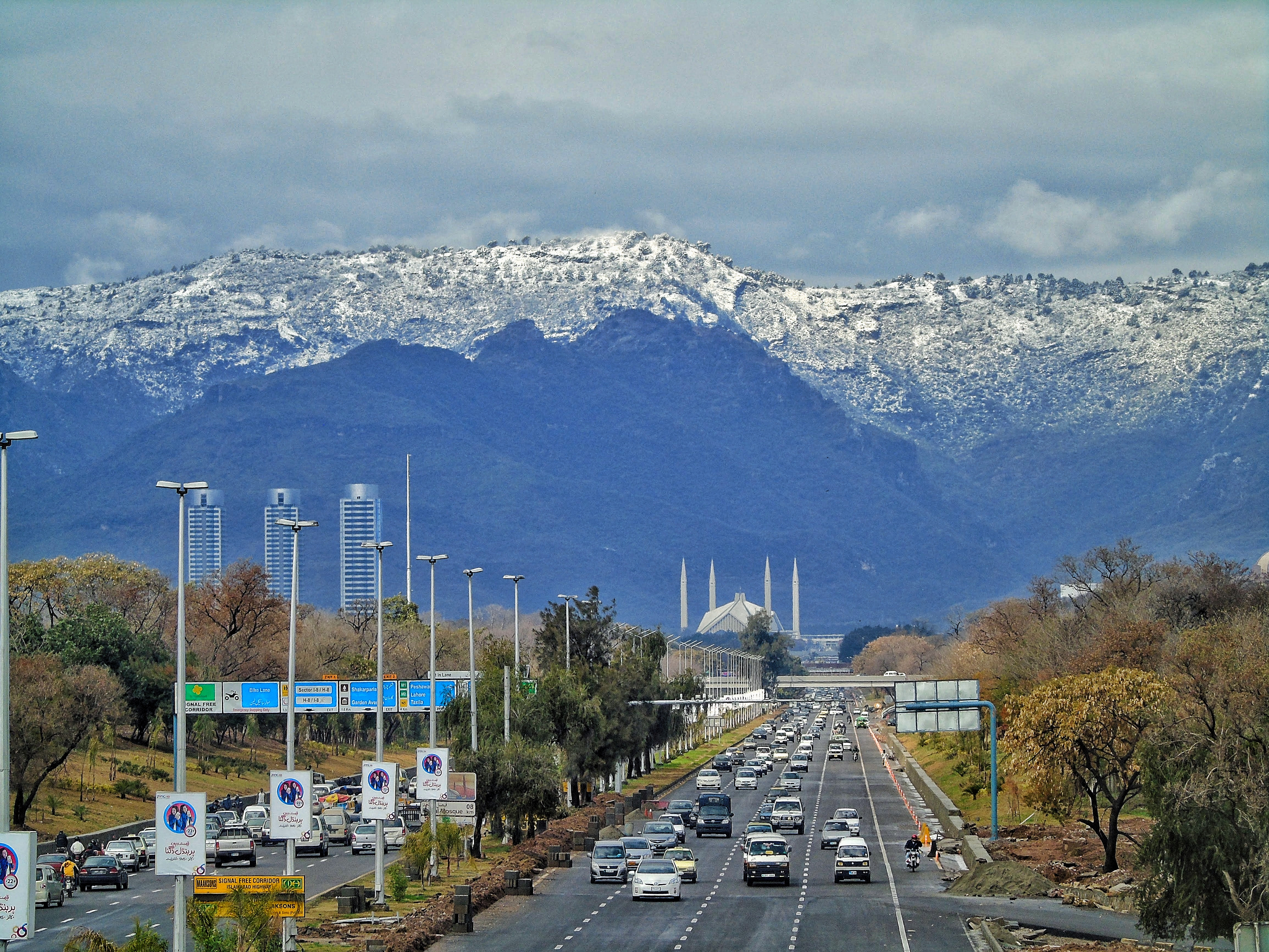

Route information
- Maintained by Capital Development Authority
- Length: 28 km (17 mi)
- Existed: 1968–present

Major junctions
- North end: Zero Point Interchange
- Shakarparian Interchange; Faizabad Interchange; Sohan Interchange; Khanna Interchange; Koral Interchange; Gulberg Greens Interchange
- South end: at T Chowk, Rawat

Location
- Country: Pakistan

Highway system
- Roads in Pakistan

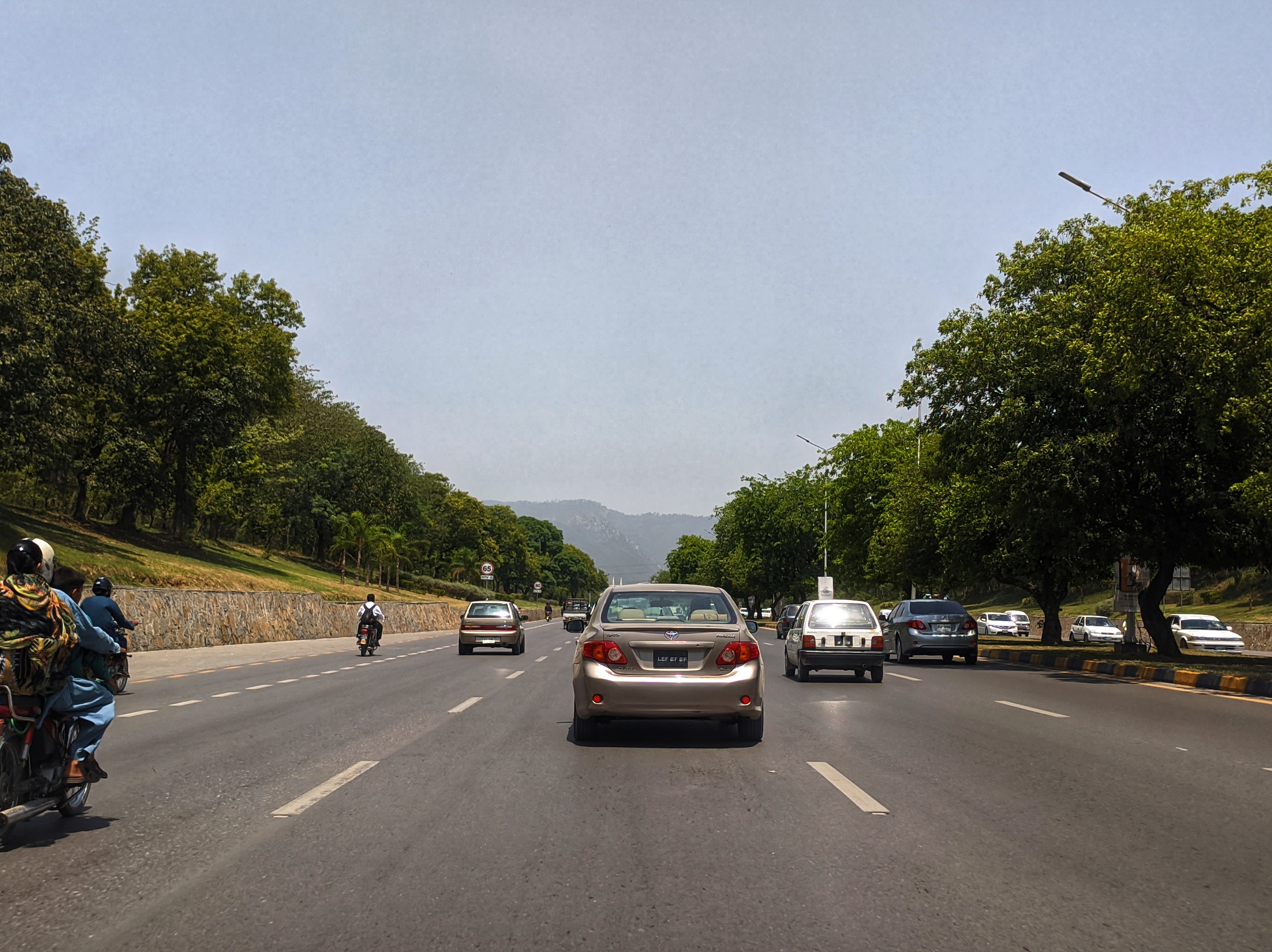
Islamabad Expressway along its designated bike lane on the left

The Islamabad Expressway (Urdu: اسلام آباد گزرگاه), sometimes also referred to as Islamabad Highway, is a major north–south expressway in Islamabad, Capital Territory, Pakistan. The expressway provides quick access between Islamabad and Rawalpindi, Punjab, connecting the national capital with the N-5 National Highway. It stretches from Zero Point Interchange with the Srinagar Highway in Islamabad to Rawat, Islamabad Capital Territory on the N-5 National Highway. The total length of the expressway is 28 kilometres (17 mi), with lanes varying from six to ten.

In 2007, the Capital Development Authority proposed to build three new interchanges on the highway at Koral Chowk, Lehtrar Road and Dhok Kala Khan Road to make it signal free. However, expansion work was delayed until 2014. The expansion later included a dedicated bike lane on the highway as well.

== Interchanges and exits ==
Exits	Interchanges
Srinagar Highway Serena Hotel, Murree, Muzzaffarabad, Srinagar (East); Islamabad Intn'l Airport, Motorways M1, M2 and N-5/ GT Road (West)	Zero Point Interchange
Garden Avenue, Shakarparian (East); Sectors H-8/I-8 (West)	Shakarparian Interchange
Rawal Lake, Murree, Muzaffarabad, Srinagar (East); IJP Road (West)	Faizabad Interchange
Sohan (East); Rawalpindi-Dhok Kala Khan (West)	Sohan Interchange
Khanna East, Lehtrar, Kotli Sattian (East); Rawalpindi-Khanna West (West)	Khanna Interchange
Karaal, Ghouri Town (East); Rawalpindi-Chaklala Cantonment (West), PAF Base Nur Khan (West)	Koral Interchange
Gulberg Greens (East); Rawalpindi-Gulbahar (West)	Gulberg Interchange
Soan Gardens, PWD Employees Cooperative Housing Society, National Police Foundation O-9 Housing Society (West)	PWD Interchange
Naval Anchorage (East)	Naval Interchange
Japan Road (East); River Gardens (West)	Japan Road Interchange
Kahuta Road, Humak Model Town (West); Sihala, Kahuta, Rawlakot (West)	Sihala Interchange
DHA Phase 5 Gate 1 (East); DHA Phase 2 Gate 7 & 8 (West)	DHA North Interchange
DHA Expressway (East); DHA Phase 2 Gate 5 (West)	DHA South Interchange
N-5 National Highway Rawalpindi (North), Jhelum, Kharian, Gujrat, Gujranwala, Lahore, Multan, Karachi (South)	T Chowk/Rawat Chowk

== See also ==
- Jinnah Avenue
- Faizabad Interchange
- Seventh Avenue (Islamabad)
- Developments in Islamabad
- Transport in Islamabad
- Expressways of Pakistan
