= Rawalpindi–Islamabad Metrobus =

Pakistani public transit system

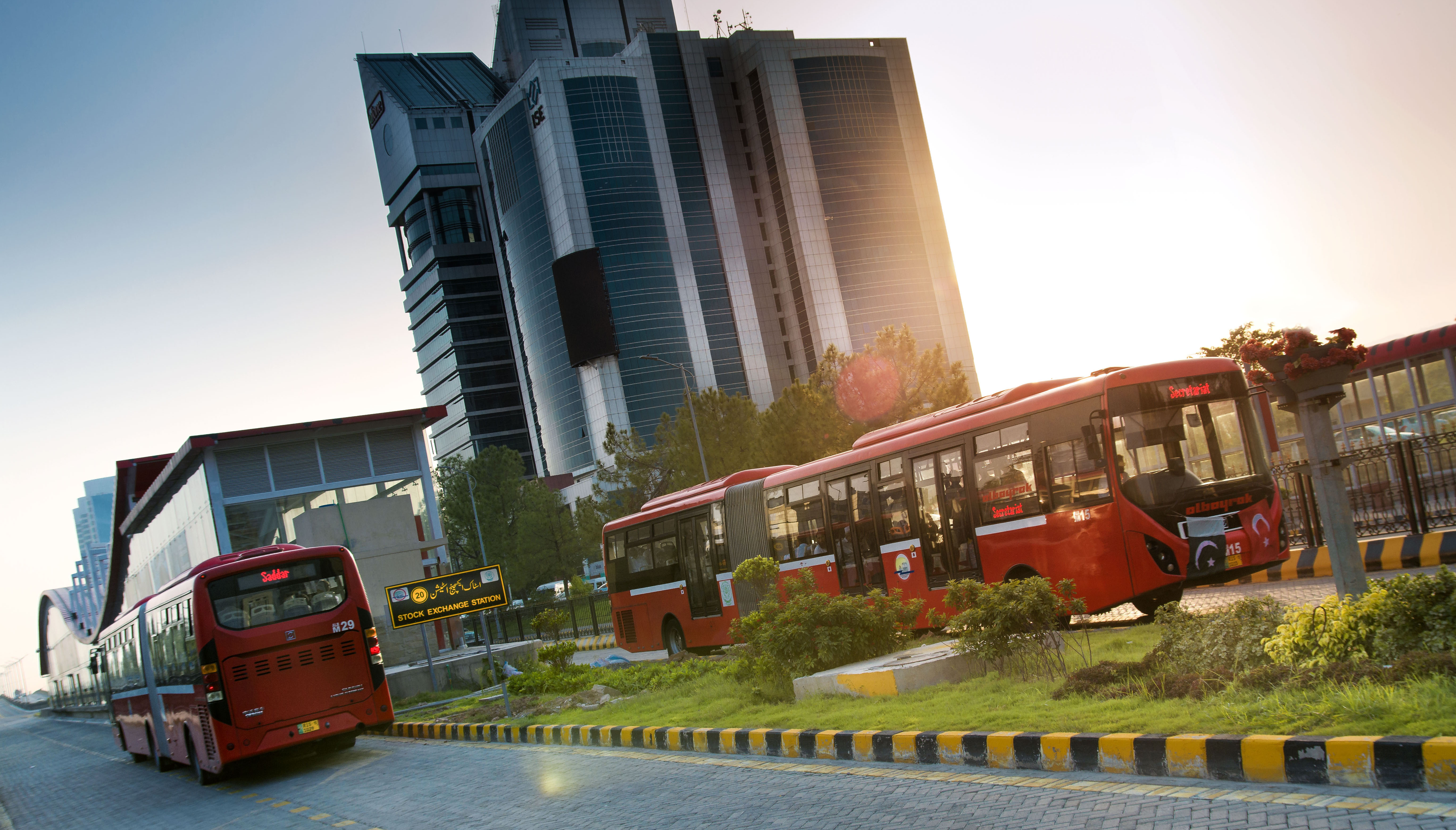

Overview
- System: Rawalpindi–Islamabad Metrobus
- Operator: Punjab Mass Transit Authority, Capital Mass Transit Authority and Capital Development Authority (Islamabad); Government of Pakistan
- Vehicles: 99
- Status: Active
- Began service: 4 June 2015; 11 years ago

Routes
- Routes: 4
- Locale: Islamabad–Rawalpindi metropolitan area
- Stops: 50 Saddar, Rawalpindi – Pak Secretariat Peshawar Morr Interchange – New Islamabad International Airport

Service
- Level: Daily
- Frequency: Red Line BRT: 3 Minutes Orange Line BRT: 5–10 minutes Green and Blue Lines: 6 minutes Islamabad Feeder Routes: 10 minutes
- Operates: 06:15 – 22:00
- Ridership: 100,558 (Red Line) + 20,000 (Orange Line)
Route map
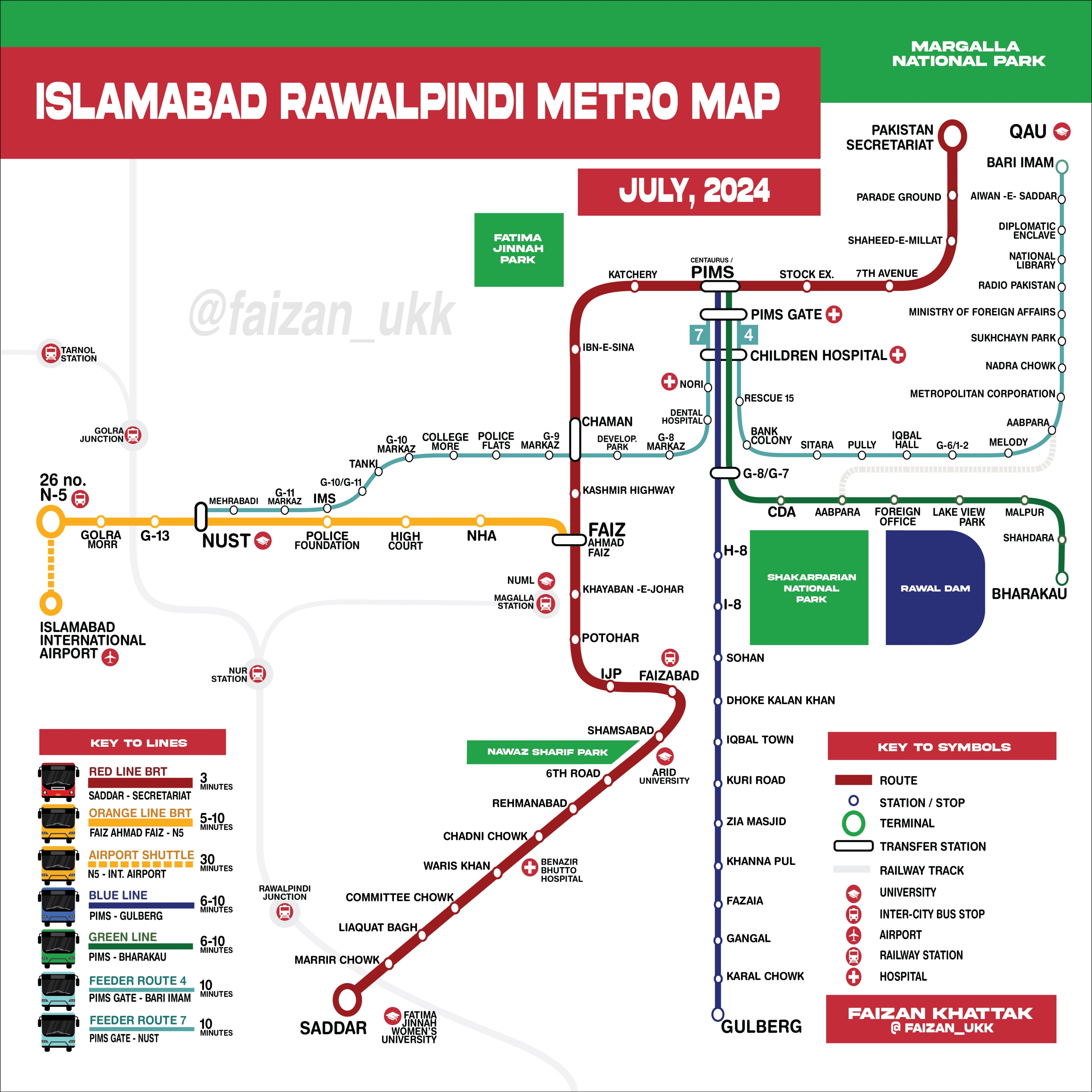
Islamabad Rawalpindi Metro Map

The Rawalpindi–Islamabad Metrobus is an 83.6-kilometre (51.9-mile) bus rapid transit system operating in the Islamabad–Rawalpindi metropolitan area of Pakistan. It consists of four routes: the Red, Orange, Blue and Green Lines. The Red and Orange Lines have dedicated lanes with purpose-built stations built along them, while the Blue and Green Lines run alongside regular traffic on the Islamabad Expressway and Srinagar Highway respectively.

The Red Line was the first to be opened, on 4 June 2015, and stretches 22.5 kilometres between Pak Secretariat in Islamabad and Saddar in Rawalpindi. The second route, the Orange Line, stretches 25.6 kilometres between the Peshawar Morr Interchange and Islamabad International Airport, and was inaugurated on 18 April 2022. The Green and Blue lines were added to the network on 7 July 2022.

The system uses e-ticketing and is managed through an Intelligent Transportation System (ITS). The Red Line is managed by the Punjab Mass Transit Authority (PMTA), while the other lines are managed by the Capital Development Authority (CDA).

On 25 November 2023, the CDA announced that it would import 160 buses from China to operate on routes defined by the CDA and operated by the NRTC. On 7 January 2024 the first batch of 30 buses arrived in Islamabad. On 1 April, a batch of 30 buses from China was scheduled to be received at Karachi and from there reach Islamabad within three weeks. On 22 May, a batch arrived in Karachi. On 4 June, a batch of 30 buses was received in Islamabad.

== History ==
Before the Metrobus project, public transport in Islamabad and Rawalpindi was rarely a viable option for commuting as many parts of the city were not connected to the center of the Rawalpindi–Islamabad metropolitan area. Therefore, after the completion of the Lahore Metrobus, plans for a similar project in the Rawalpindi–Islamabad metropolitan area were made.

=== Phase One: Red Line ===
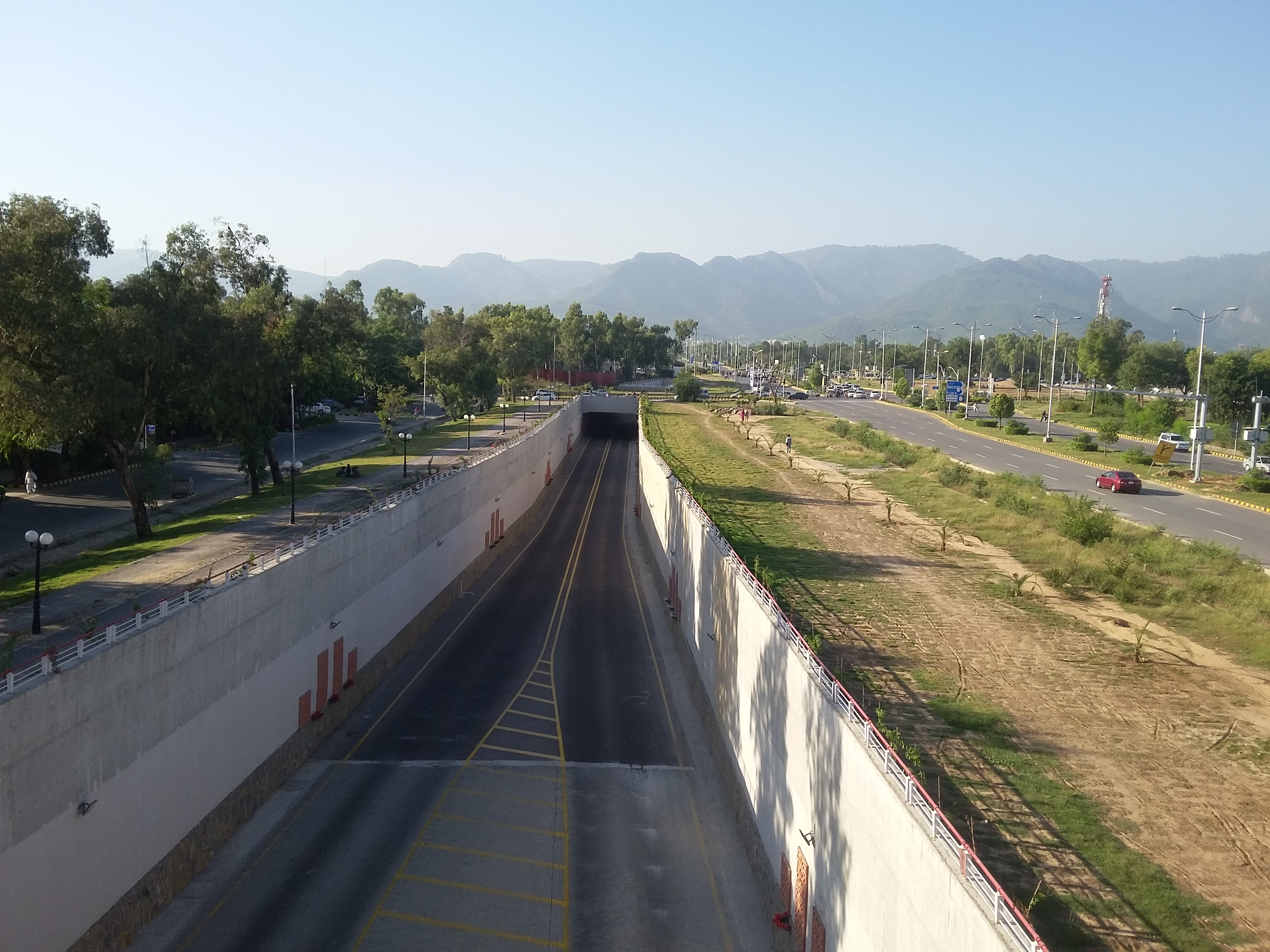
The Red Line is partially underground.

Construction of the bus rapid transit system began on 28 February 2014 and was completed by June 2015, with 60 buses initially travelling the route. The Rawalpindi Development Authority was tasked with overseeing the project at a cost of approximately Rs. 44.31 billion (US$160 million), which was split between the federal government and the Punjab provincial government.

The construction was divided into five packages. The project was started on 23 April 2014 and completed on 27 March 2015 at a total cost of Rs. 33.5 billion (US$120 million) as quoted by the contractor of the project. The construction project was awarded to Habib Construction Services, one of the largest construction companies in Pakistan who had worked on several other large projects previously.

In February 2023, PMTA announced the creation of an express route for Red Line, operating from Monday to Thursday. It ran from Saddar to Faizabad and from Faiz Ahmad Faiz to Rehmanabad.

=== Phase Two: Orange, Green and Blue Lines ===
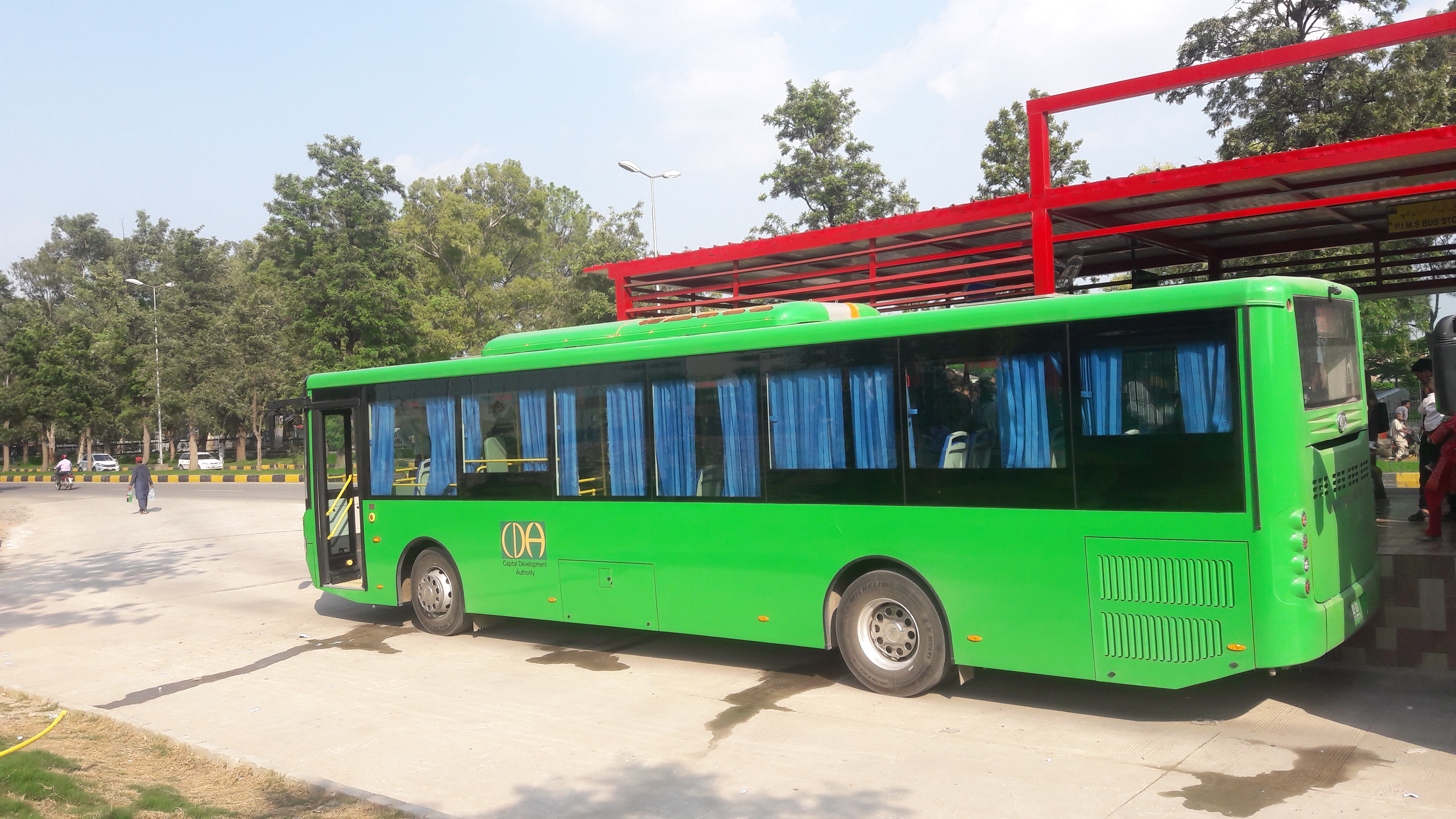
Islamabad Green Line Metrobus

The 25.6 km Orange Line route from Peshawar Morr to New Islamabad International Airport, costing Rs. 16 billion (US$57 million), was started by the PML-N government in 2017 and was originally scheduled for completion in 2018. After a delay of five years, it was inaugurated on 18 April 2022 by Prime Minister Shehbaz Sharif. Thirty buses were expected to arrive from China for this route, but they faced delays due to the closure of the Port of Shanghai as a result of the COVID-19 pandemic. Consequently, the CDA started operations on this route by borrowing 15 buses from the Red Line. The Faiz Ahmad Faiz station of the Red Line was turned into an interchange station between the Red Line and Orange Line. For the first month of Ramadan, the Orange Line was free to ride.

The new PML-N government also began work on the Blue Line and Green Line routes. Initially, the Blue Line route ran between the PIMS and Koral Chowk while the Green Line route ran between the PIMS and Bhara Kahu. More stops were added to these routes later on. 30 buses were ordered from China for the new routes, of which 15 were placed on the Orange Line route, with the rest placed on the Blue and Green Line routes.

For these new routes, the federal government created the Capital Mass Transit Authority (CMTA) to run the operations of the Orange, Green and Blue Lines, as well as of all future Metrobus routes.

=== Phase Three: Feeder Routes ===
In late 2022, the CDA approached the National University of Sciences & Technology (NUST) to carry out a feasibility study to identify new potential routes. The study identified 13 potential new bus routes. These routes are intended to connect the existing Metrobus network to all corners of Islamabad. Upon his arrival in Islamabad, the new CDA Chairman Noorul Amin Mengal announced the starting of work on these new routes.

Out of 13 marked feeder routes, four are operational: FR-4 (Bari Imam to PIMS), FR-7 (PIMS to NUST), FR-3A (PIMS to Pak Sect via Faisal Masjid) and FR-9 (Faizabad to Pirwadhi Mor). A shuttle service from Bari Imam to QAU (numbered FR-4A) was also introduced to facilitate QAU students.

== Lines ==
Line	Operator	Opening date	Length	Dedicated track	Route	Number of stations	Number of buses	Frequency	Journey time (end to end)	Notes
Red	Punjab Masstransit Authority and Capital Development Authority	4 June 2015	22.5 km (14.0 mi)	Yes	Pak Secretariat – Saddar	24	68	Every 3 to 6 minutes during daytime hours (06:00–20:00)		
Orange	Capital Development Authority	18 April 2022	25.6 km (15.9 mi)	Yes	Faiz Ahmed Faiz Station (H-8/2) – Airport	7	15	Every 10 minutes		
Blue	Capital Development Authority	7 July 2022	20 km (12 mi)	Shared	PIMS – Gulberg	13	10	Every 6 minutes	One hour	
Green	Capital Development Authority	7 July 2022	15.5 km (9.6 mi)	Shared	PIMS – Bharakau	8	5	Every 6 minutes		

== Feeder routes ==
Line	Operator	Opening date	Length	Dedicated track	Route	Number of stations	Number of buses	Frequency	Journey time (end to end)	Notes
FR-4	Capital Development Authority	5 July 2024		Shared	PIMS Gate – Bari Imam	19	15	Every 10 minutes	45 Minutes	
FR-7	Capital Development Authority	5 July 2024		Shared	PIMS Gate – NUST Station	17	15	Every 10 minutes	35 Minutes	
FR-8	Capital Development Authority	25 December 2024		Shared	PIMS Gate – Taramari Chowk	18	15	Every 10 minutes	40 minutes	

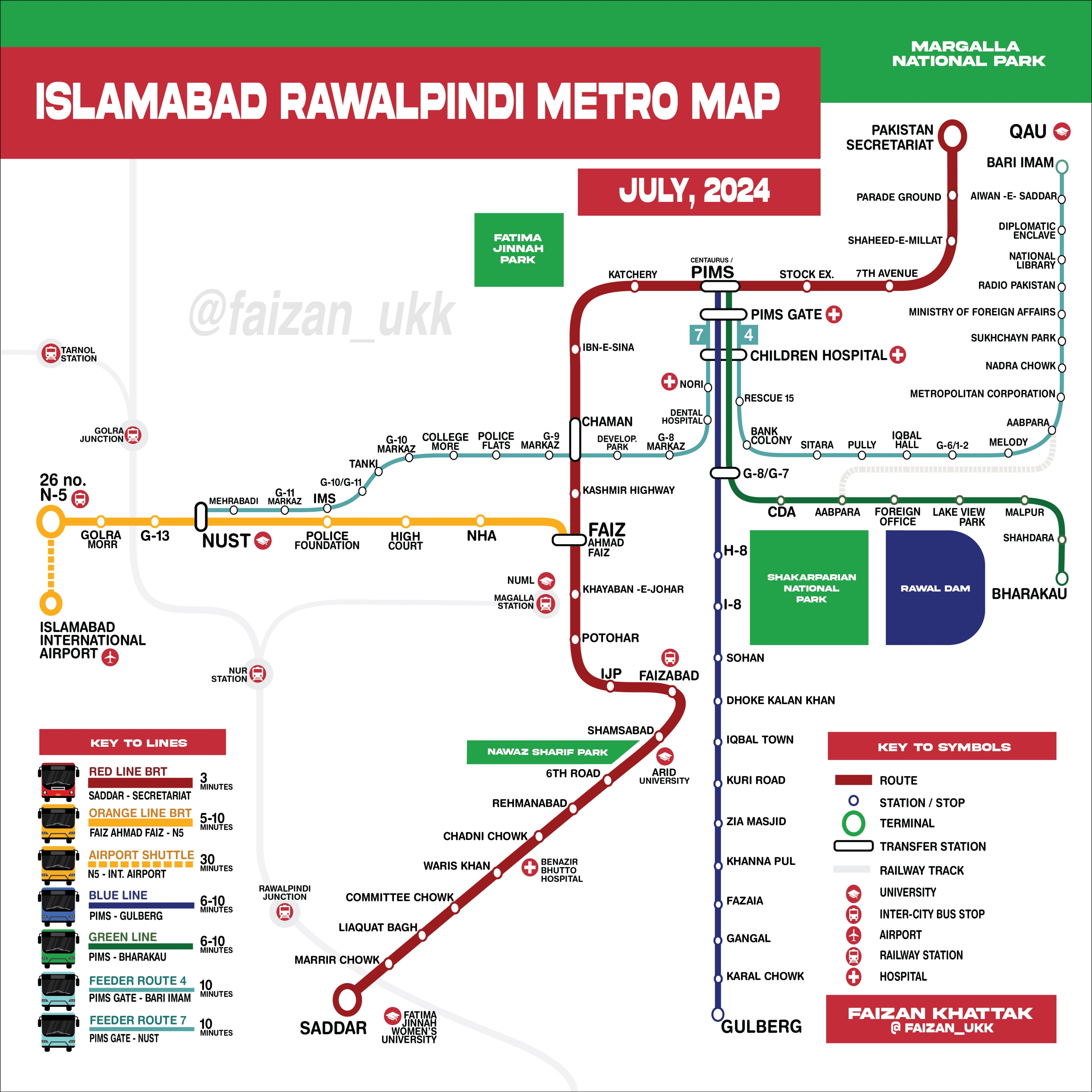
Islamabad Rawalpindi Metro Map

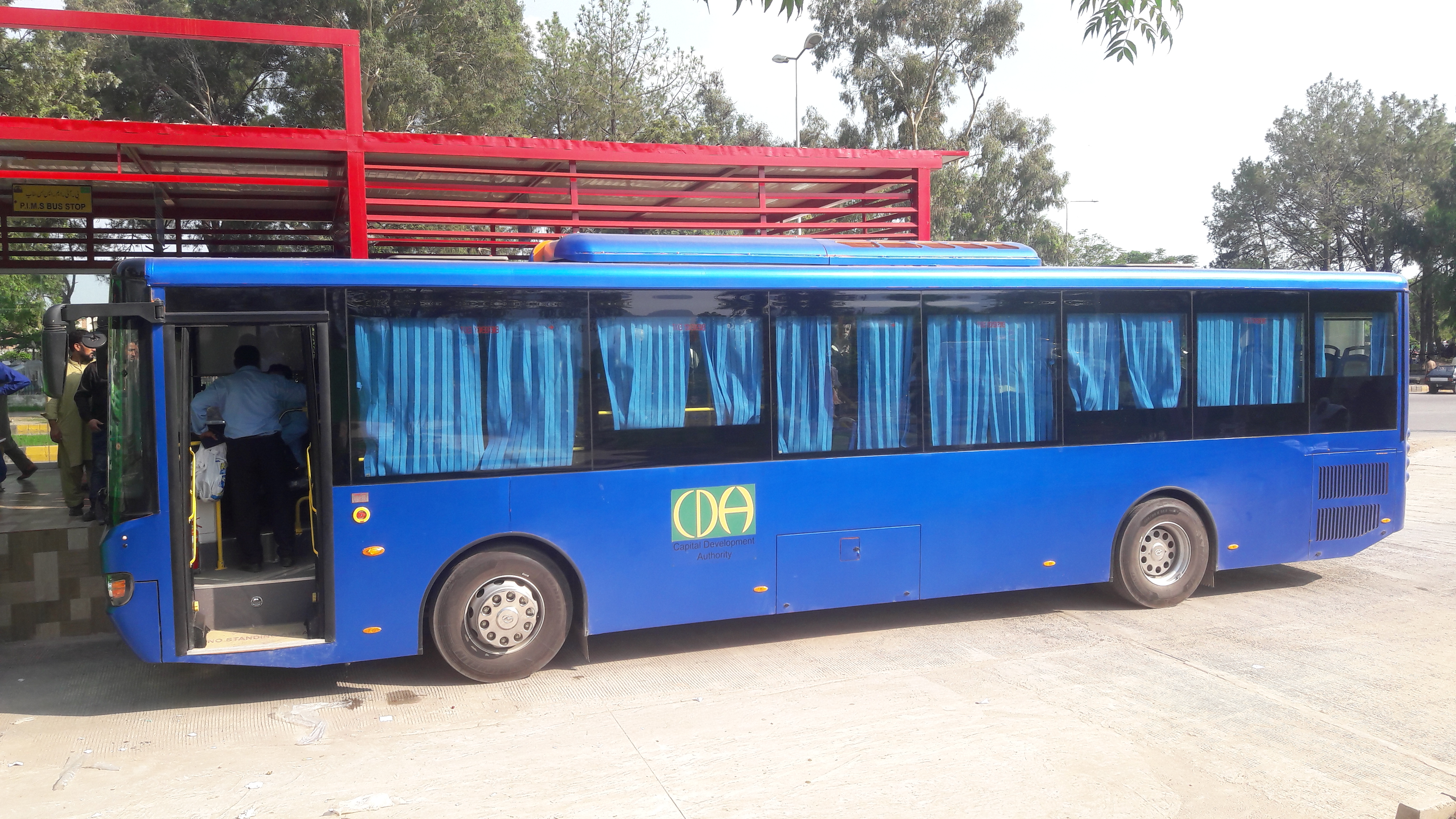
Islamabad Blue Line Metrobus

== Stations ==
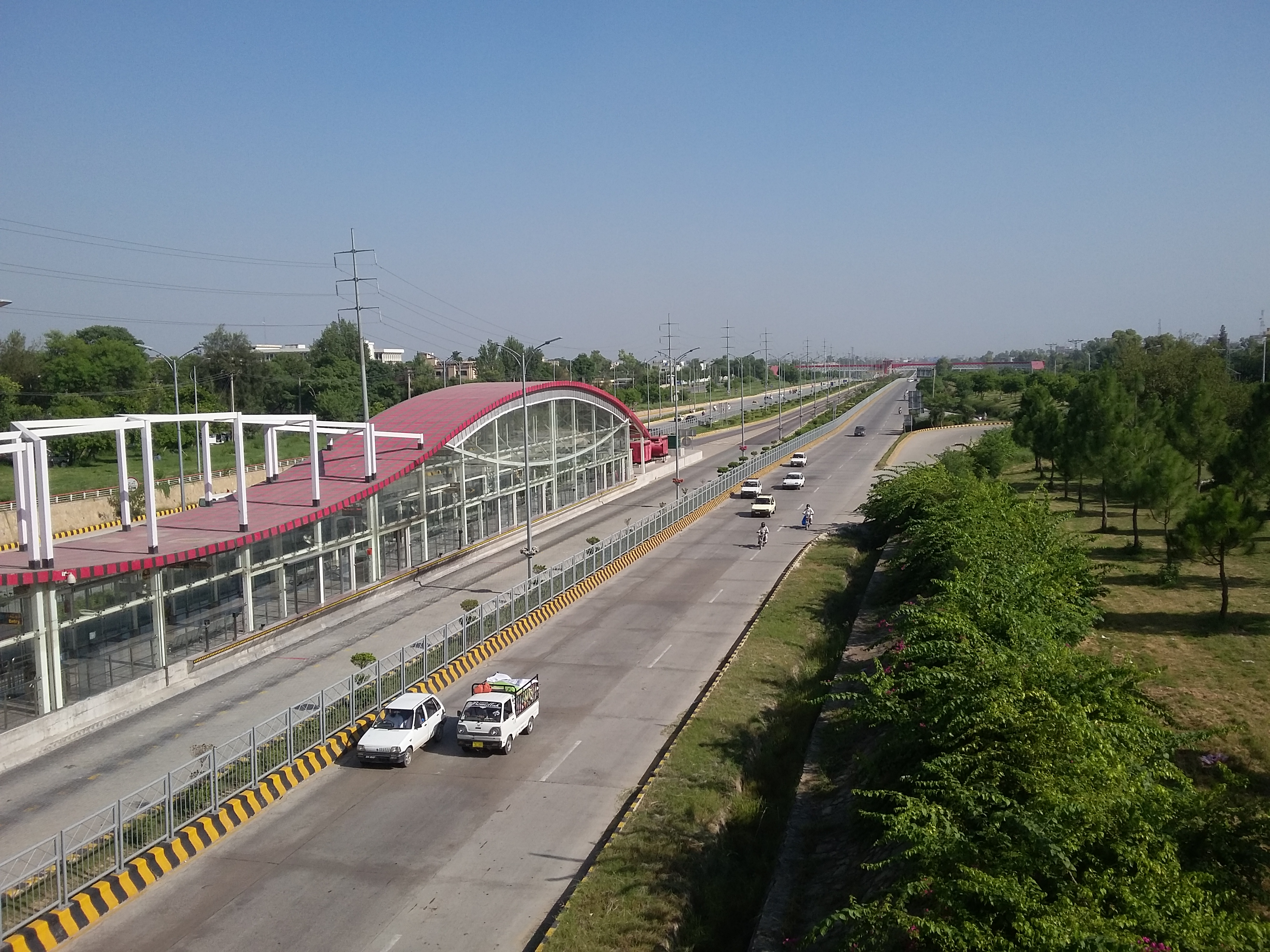
Red Line Metrobus station Islamabad

The stations of the Red and Orange Lines include ticketing booths, concourse level passenger transfer, escalators, platform screens, public toilets, doors, turnstiles for automatic fare collection and other amenities for passenger convenience. A central ITS control room is also included in the project to control the operation of the whole Metrobus system.

Stations of the Green and Blue Lines are at ground level. At many stations, there are no pedestrian crossings on main highways such as the Kashmir Highway. This can put commuters at risk and reduce the appeal of the service.

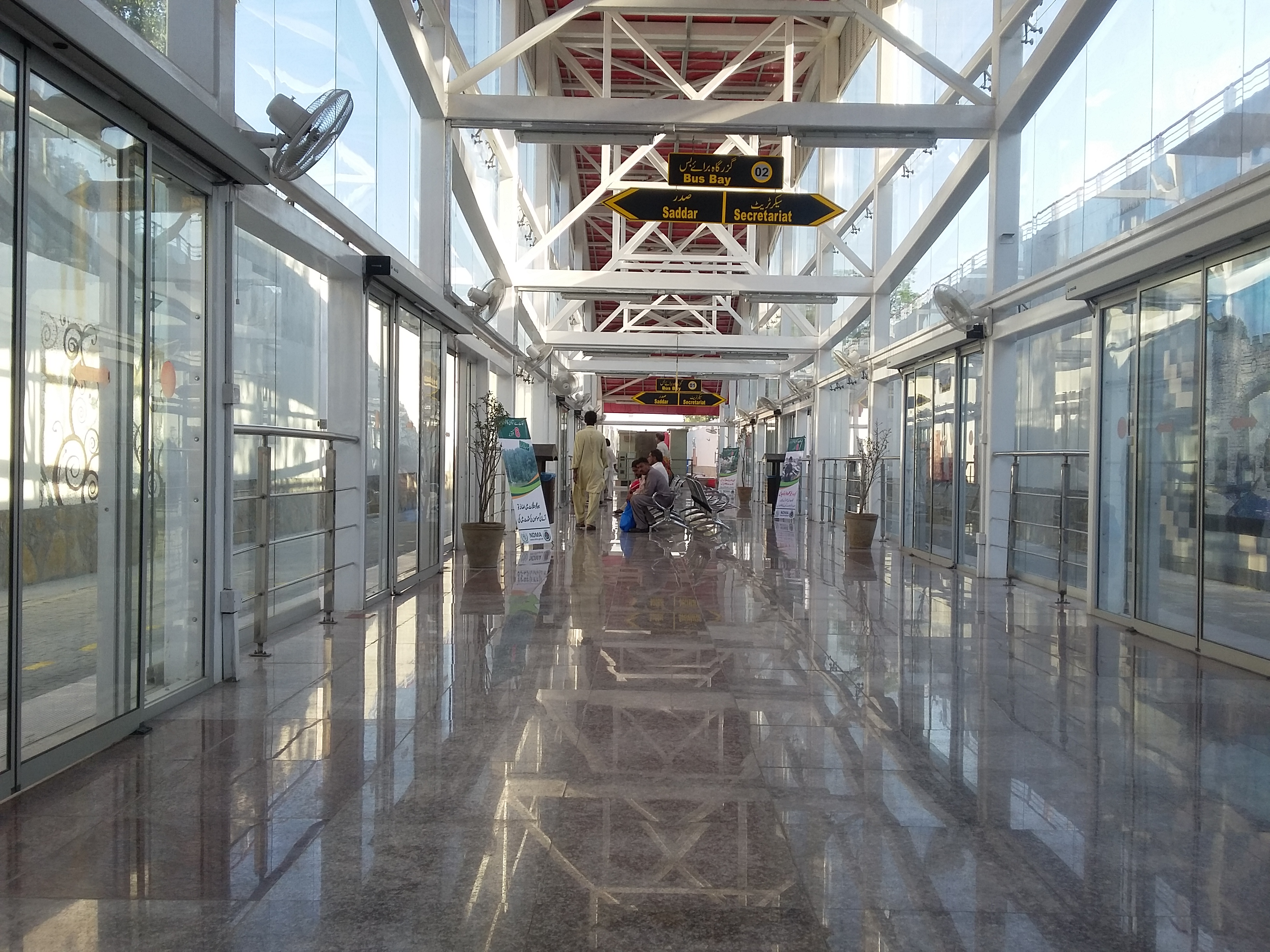
Islamabad Metro Station interior

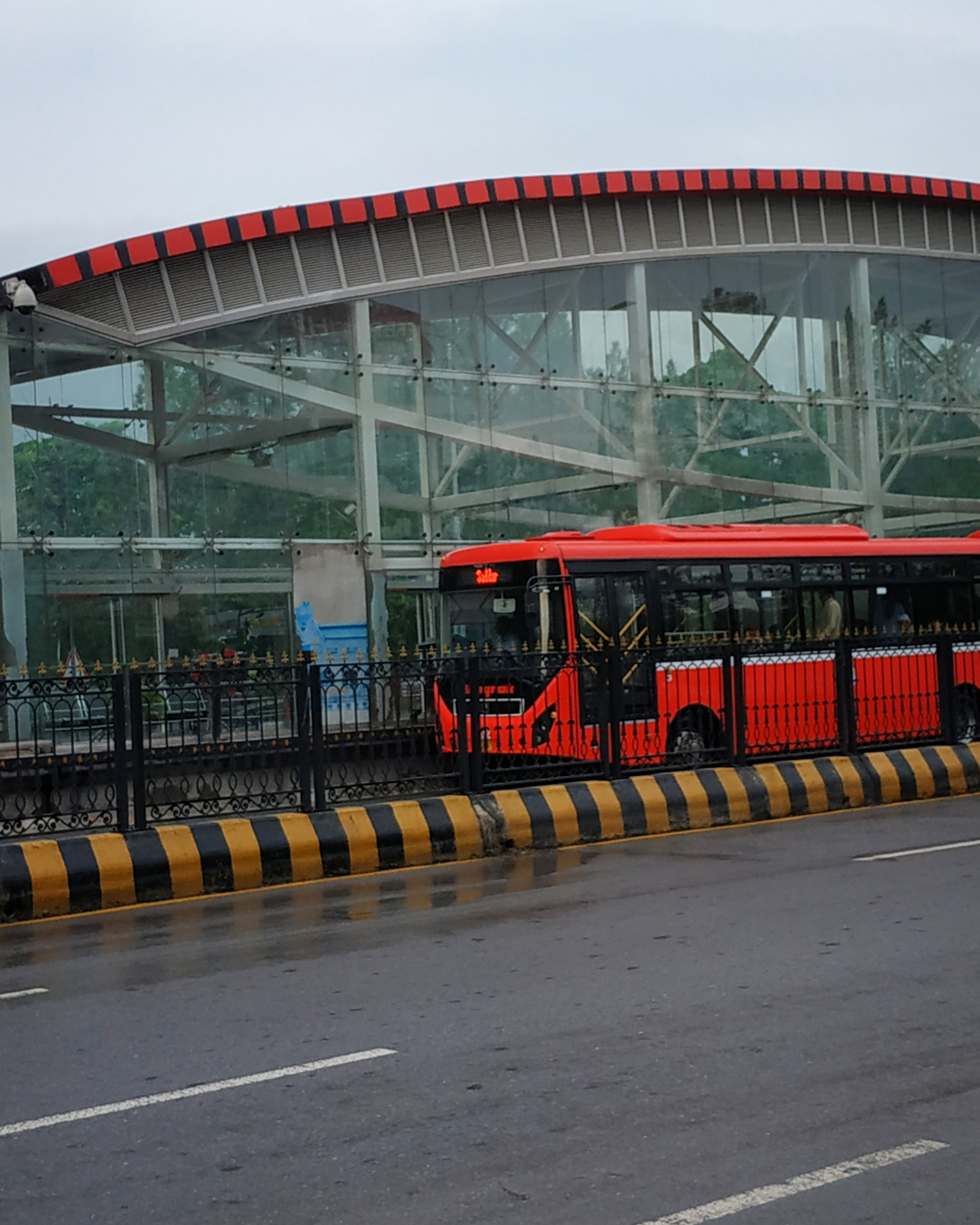
A station of the Islamabad-Rawalpindi Metrobus (Red Line) in Blue Area

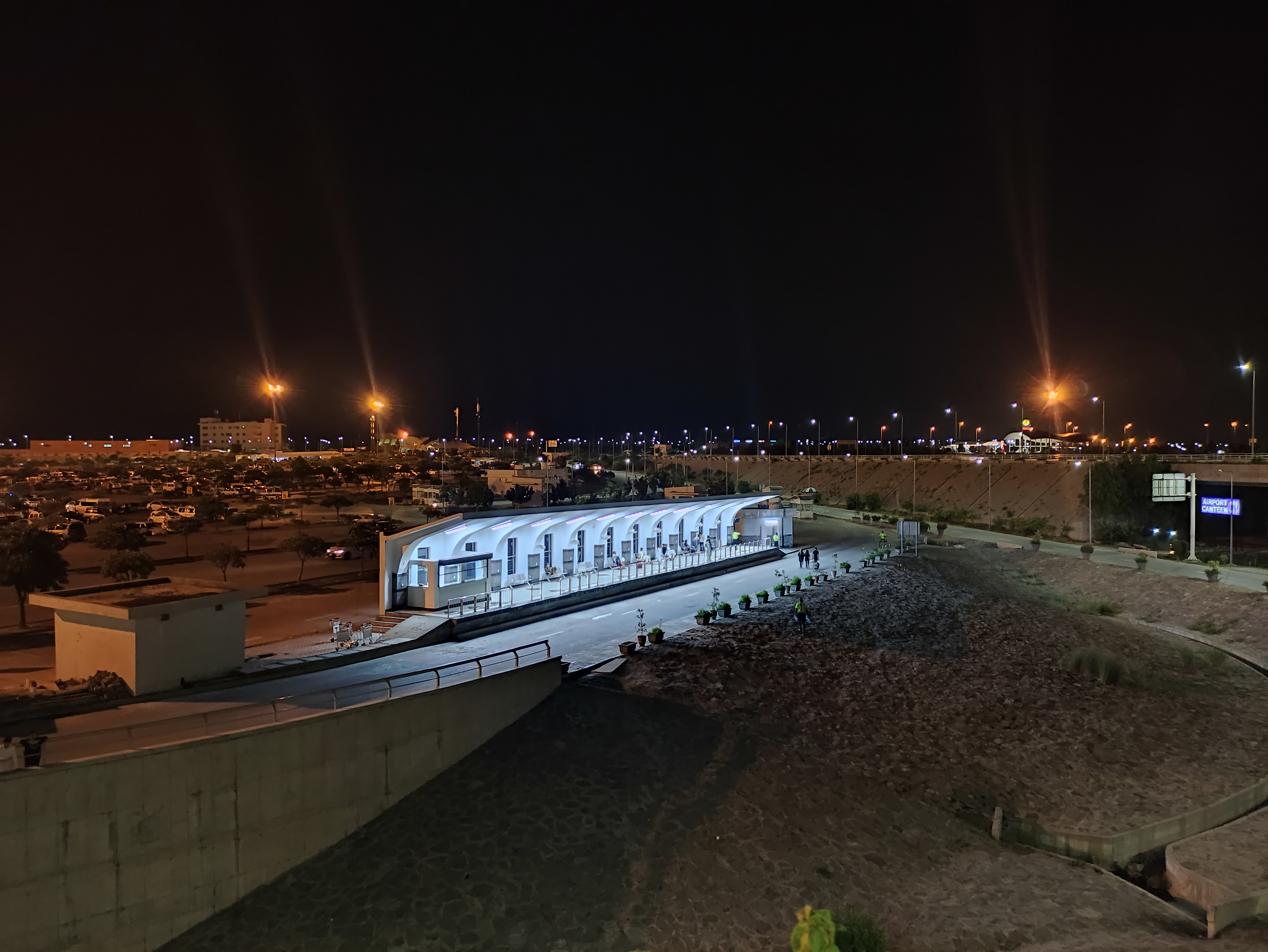
Islamabad International Airport station on the Orange Line route

== Ticketing and fares ==
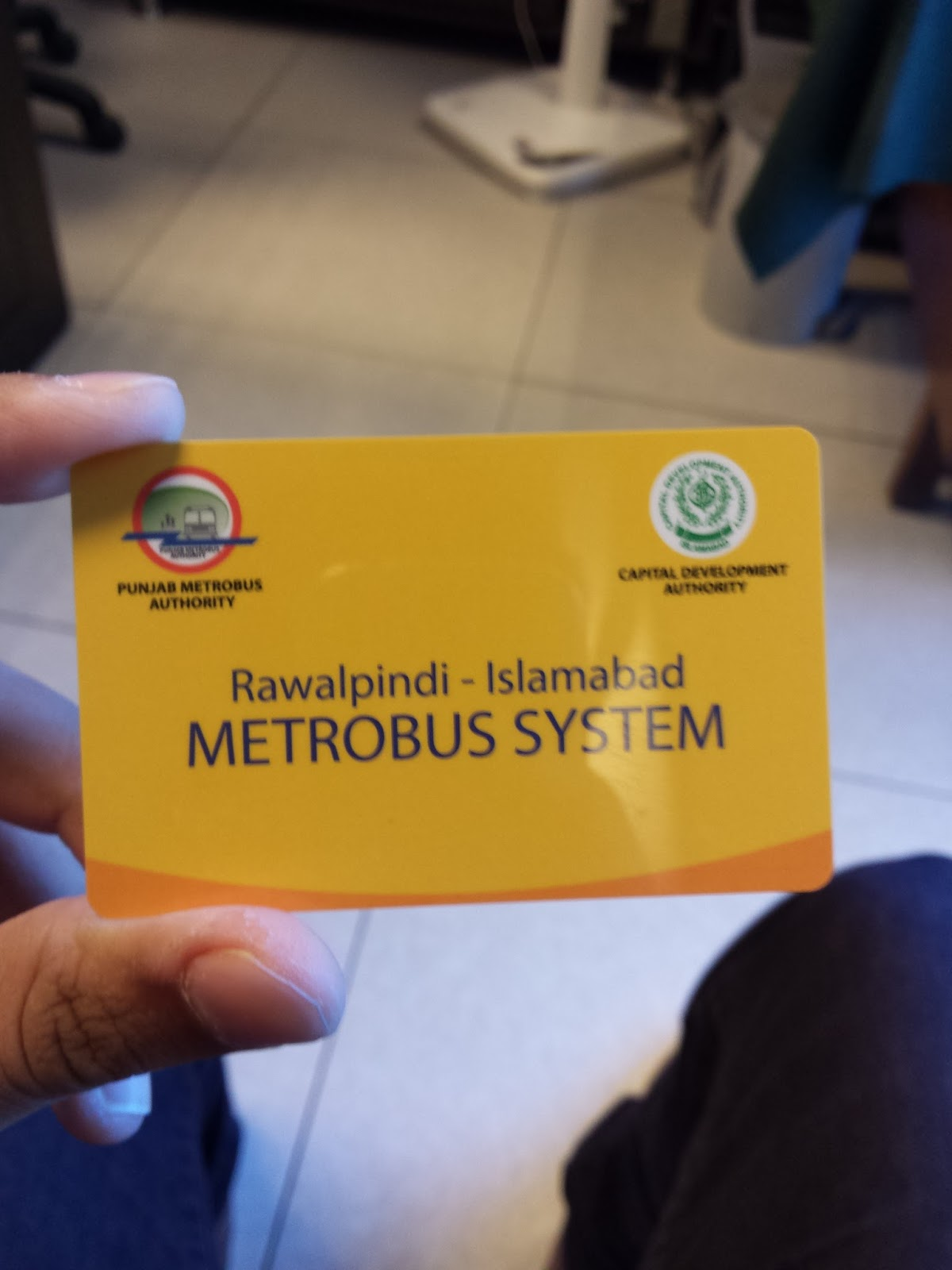
Rawalpindi – Islamabad Metrobus card

The Red and Orange Lines use e-ticketing and an Intelligent Transportation System wand influenced by the Peshawar BRT. The ticketing options include a single-ride token and a refillable Metrobus card.

The Green and Blue Lines do not have a similar standardized ticketing system. As of October 2024, the CDA is working on creating a streamlined ticketing system for the feeder routes using KentKart-based ticket solutions which support card payment, online payment through an app, and one-time paper-based tickets. However, these solutions have not been launched.

== Fleet ==
The initial fleet consisted of 68 articulated, 18 metre-long, high-floor buses for the Red Line route. These buses were imported and supplied by VPL Limited from the China-based company Sunwin Bus, which is a joint venture formed between the SAIC Motor Corporation Limited and the Sweden-based Volvo Bus Company. VPL Limited is also the sole after-sales distributor for both Volvo Buses and Sunwin Buses in Pakistan, among other products.

In 2022, 30 buses were imported from China for the Orange Line route. Twenty of these buses are traveling on the Orange Line route. Moreover, 20 low-floor buses were also procured for the Blue and Green Lines (10 each).

Electric buses for feeder routes

About 160 HIGER model electric buses have been handed over to the NRTC in China for onward dispatch to Islamabad. These new buses will be used on the Metrobus feeder routes in Islamabad.

== Controversies ==
The rainy season of 2015 exposed significant problems with the drainage systems of the network. One of the worst affected stations was the PIMS station, where operations were severely affected by flooding. Similarly, cracks appeared after a minor earthquake in Rawalpindi, which raised questions over the structural integrity of the project's infrastructure.

The long-term financial model used to underpin the project has become a matter of controversy. Reports show that although 150,000 passengers were expected, the lack of feeder routes, led to the network having only 80,000 passengers in the long run. The high cost of fuelling for 68 buses led to the number of buses in use being reduced to 35. This led to overcrowding during peak travelling hours.

The lengthy delay in completing the Orange Line route was also controversial. Although meant to be inaugurated in August 2018, the route was not completed until April 2022. Even after its completion, electrical and civil works continued on sections of the line's route. Furthermore, there was a dispute between the CDA, NHA and Punjab MetroBus Authority over who would operate the route. It was decided that the CDA would run it until a Metro Bus Authority for Islamabad was created.

In 2015, a controversy surrounding the project's annual losses emerged. According to official numbers, a single bus trip costs Rs. 9,100 (US$33) to operate, while generating only Rs. 2,600 (US$9.30) of revenue, resulting in a loss of Rs. 6,500 (US$23) on each trip. These losses were initially subsidised by the Punjab government, but it was decided in 2016 to divide the losses between the Punjab government and the CDA on the basis of length in Rawalpindi and Islamabad. However, the CDA refused to pay for these losses, attributing it to a lack of funds in 2016. The federal government provided funds to the CDA to help shoulder the burden of the Punjab Mass Transit Authority in 2016, however, in 2017 the problem surfaced again, raising questions on the long-term losses and the financial burden of the project.

== See also ==
- Rapid transit in Pakistan
- Lahore Metrobus
- Multan Metrobus
- Karachi Metrobus
- TransPeshawar
