= 2015 Islamabad local elections =

Pakistani capital territory elections

2015 Islamabad local government elections
- 30 November 2015

77 seats of the Islamabad Metropolitan Corporation 39 seats needed for a majority
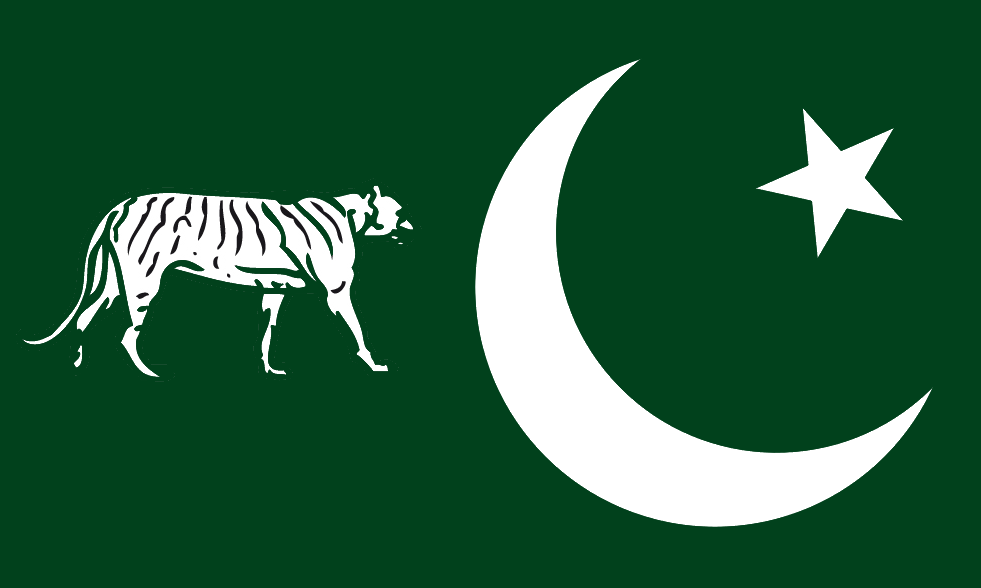

	Majority party	Minority party
Leader	Sheikh Ansar Aziz	Khurram Shehzad Nawaz
Party	PML(N)	PTI
Leader since	13 March 2018	25 April 1996
Leader's seat	Technocrat	UC-8 Tumair
Seats won	50	27
- Results by Union Council Chairmen Elected
Mayor of Islamabad before election
N/A
Elected Mayor of Islamabad
Sheikh Ansar Aziz
PML(N)

Local elections were held in Islamabad on November 30, 2015. The Pakistan Muslim League (N) (PML(N)) obtained a landslide victory, winning 50 of the 77 seats in the Islamabad Municipal Corporation (IMC), while the Pakistan Tehreek-e-Insaf (PTI) won the remaining 27 seats.

There were 676,795 eligible voters. Tight security measures were enforced on polling day. No incidents of violence were reported.

== Results ==
=== Islamabad Metropolitan Corporation ===
Party	UC Chairmen	Reserved seats					
Party	UC Chairmen	Women	Minorities	Peasants/Workers	Youth	Technocrat	Total
Pakistan Muslim League (N)	32	11	2	2	2	1	50
Pakistan Tehreek-e-Insaf	18	6	1	1	1	0	27
Total:	50	17	3	3	3	1	77

Following the election, twelve UC Chairmen who were elected as independents joined the PML(N), while two joined the PTI increasing their numbers to 32 and 18, respectively. After the allocation of reserved seats, the PML(N)‘s number of seats increased to 50 and the PTI’s number of seats increased to 27. Following this, Sheikh Ansar Aziz of the PML(N), who was elected on the reserved technocrat seat, defeated Khurram Shehzad Nawaz of the PTI, who was elected to UC-8 Tumair, to become Islamabad’s first Mayor. Aziz received 49 votes while Nawaz received 26 votes.

=== Results by Union Council ===
Union Council	Elected Chairman	
Union Council	Name	Party
Saidpur	Shiraz Kiyani	PTI
Noorpur Shahan	Pir Adil Shah	IND
Mal Pur	Chaudhry Mushtaq Ahmed	PML(N)
Kot Hathial North	Ishtiaq Ahmed Malik	PML(N)
Kot Hathial South	Muhammad Wahid	PML(N)
Phulgran	Waqar Ahmed	PML(N)
Pind Begowal	Raja Qaiser Ghaffar	PTI
Tumair	Khurram Shehzad Nawaz	PTI
Charah	Raja Zulqurnain Haider	IND
Kirpa	Zahid Hussain	IND
Mughal	Adil Aziz Qazi	IND
Rawat	Azhar Mehmood	IND
Humak	Qazi Faisal Naeem	PML(N)
Sihala	Chaudhry Naeem Akhter	IND
Loi Bher	Malik Ikhlaq Ahmed Awan	PTI
Pahg Panwal	Chaudhry Muhammad Hanif	IND
Koral	Qaiser Javed Bhatti	IND
Khana Dak	Waseem Sana Malik	PML(N)
Tarlai Kalan	Chaudhry Manzoor Hussain	PML(N)
Ali Pur	Syed Ibrar Hussain	IND
Sohan Dehati	Malik Amir Ali	PTI
Chak Shahzad	Chaudhry Matloob Hussain	PML(N)
Kuri	Muhammad Jamil	IND
Rawal Town & Margala Town	Syed Zaheer Ahmed Shah	PML(N)
F-6	Attique Ullah Khan Khattak	PTI
G-6/1	Chaudhry Allah Ditta	PML(N)
G-6/2, G-6/3 & G-6/4	Anjum Shahzad Tanoli	PTI
F-7, F-8 & Jinnah Park F-9	Fawzia Arshad	PTI
F-10 & F-11	Khurram Bakhtiar	PTI
G-7/3 & G-7/4	Muhammad Naeem Ali	IND
G-7/1 & G-7/2	Ahmad Khan	PTI
G-8/3 & G-8/4	Muhammad Munir Ashraf	PML(N)
G-8/1 & G-8/2	Raja Waheed Ullah Hasan	PML(N)
G-9/1, G-9/3 & G-9/4	Malik Sajjad	PML(N)
G-9/2	Muhammad Rafiq	PTI
G-10/3 & G-10/4	Faisal Nadeem	PTI
G-10/1 & G-10/2	Malik Sajid Mehmood	PTI
G-11	Tanveer Hussain	PTI
Maira Sumbal Jaffar	Sajid Mehmood	PML(N)
I-8	Ali Nawaz Awan	PTI
I-9	Sardar Mehtab Ahmed Khan	PML(N)
I-10/1 & I-10/4	Farman Ali Mughal	PML(N)
I-10/2 & I-10/3	Muhammad Ishfaq	PML(N)
Bokra	Muhammad Aftab	PML(N)
Jhangi Saydan	Gulfaraz Khan	IND
Badhana Kalan	Hafeez Ur Rehman Tipu	PML(N)
Tarnol	Malik Rizwan Ahmed	IND
Sarai Kharbooza	Muhammad Azam Khan	IND
Shah Allah Ditta	Syed Zeeshan Ali Naqvi	PML(N)
Golra Sharif	Shoaib Khan	PTI
