= Islamabad District Court =

Pakistani courts

Islamabad is served by two district courts. Appeals from these courts are heard in Islamabad High Court. The Court currently sits in F-11, while separate Judicial Complex buildings are under plan.

== History ==
From 1980 to 2011, District Judiciary was under the control of supervision of Lahore High Court, Lahore. Under the 18th amendment of the Constitution, the Islamabad High Court was established and it was also given the supervision over District Judiciary Islamabad.

In 2012, two Judicial districts were divided into East and West:

=== Islamabad West ===
- All sectors of Islamabad
- Union council Shah Allah Ditta, Saidpur, and Noorpur Shahan.

=== Islamabad East ===
- 11 Union Councils: Rawat, Sihala, Koral, Tarlai, Bharakahu, Kirpa, Chirah, Sohan, Kurri, Tumair, and Phulgran
- The villages Ojri and Malpur.

== See also ==
- Islamabad High Court
- District courts of Pakistan
- Capital Development Authority
