= Maira Begwal =

Coordinates: 33°44′N 73°16′E

Maira Begwal [Urdu: میرا بیگوال] is a village located on Simly Dam Road in Zone-IV, Islamabad Capital Territory, Pakistan and is administered by the Pind Begwal Union Council. Its geographical coordinates are 33.74 N,73.25 E and its original name (with diacritics) is Maira Begwal.

A hillside village with picturesque landscapes, Maira Begwal is home to approximately 2000 residents with most of them employed in either agricultural farming or small family-owned businesses around the village. Also a large number are providing their services outside the country all over the world.

== Farmhouses ==
Maira Begwal encompasses the following farmhouse schemes;

- Pakistan Naval Farms
- ANZA Zephyr Dale

Note: Generally the land ownership registration and transfer process is achieved through Registry (Intiqal) with Land Registrar (Tehsildar) Islamabad through a Village accountant (Patwari) for the respective Union Council.

== Development ==
- A model Polytechnic Institute is being established by the Allama Iqbal Open University (AIOU) with the collaboration of the Capital Administration and Development Division. AIOU will introduce Diploma and Associate Diploma Courses in various disciplines and other skilled and job-oriented programmes.
- Under "E-Village Project of Pakistan", the Multi-purpose Computer Telecentre (MCT) was established in May 2009 as a Not-for-profit project. With the support of the Universal Service Fund, Maira Begwal became the first E-Village in Pakistan with Broadband Internet provided by Nayatel Islamabad enabling Internet access to the rural population of the entire area.

== Events ==
- On 8 March 2014 on the occasion of International Women’s Day, the NUST Community Service Club (NCSC) team visited the E-village facilities in Maira Begwal for the Fundraiser in collaboration with TABA Youth Chapter and E-village coordinators. E-Village is a Non-governmental organization (NGO), working for Empowerment through ICT's in Pakistan.

== See also ==
- Islamabad Union Councils
- Developments in Islamabad
- Union councils of Pakistan
- Pind Begwal
- Siwerah Village
- Jagiot Village
- Malot Village
- Bain Nala Village
- Darmiyana Mohallah
