= Bagga Shaikhan =

Pakistani village

- Village
- Location within Pakistan
- Coordinates: 33.46°N 73.19°E
- Country: Pakistan
- Capital Territory: Islamabad
- District: Islamabad
- Union council: Rawat
- Elevation: 570 m (1,870 ft)
- Time zone: UTC+5 (PST)

== Notable people ==
- Muhammad Shoaib (also known as Ch Shoaib) is a Pakistani software engineer and iOS developer who resides in Bagga Shaikhan.(https://www.linkedin.com/in/shoaib-iosdeveloper/)

Bagga Shaikhan is a beautiful village in Rawat, on Chak Beli Khan Rawat road within Islamabad Capital Territory. It is located at 33.4659° N, 73.1925° E with an altitude of 570 meters (1870 ft).

== Telecommunication ==
The PTCL provides the main network of landline telephone. Many ISPs and all major mobile phone, Wireless companies operating in Pakistan provide service in Bagga Shaikhan.

== Languages ==
Punjabi is the main language of Bagga Shaikhan, other languages are Urdu Pothohari, and rarely spoken language Pashto.
