= Charah =

Charah may refer to:

- Charah, Islamabad, a neighbourhood of Islamabad, Pakistan
- Cheraw, also known as Charáh, a Native American tribe that was adopted into the Catawba Indian Nation

== See also ==
- Çarah, a village in Azerbaijan
- Chahar (disambiguation)
