= Malot =

Malot may refer to:

== People ==
- Hector Malot (1830–1907), French writer
- Leah Malot (born 1972), Kenyan runner

== Places ==
- Malot, Islamabad, Pakistan
- Malot Fort, Pakistan
