= Sohan (Islamabad) =

Union Council in Islamabad sohan distric , Pakistan

- Union Council
- Location within Pakistan
- Coordinates: 33.66°N 73.0974°E
- Country: Pakistan
- Province: (Islamabad Capital Territory) Islamabad C.T
- Elevation: 457 m (1,499 ft)
- Time zone: UTC+5 (PST)

Sohan is a village and Union Council situated in Islamabad Capital Territory of Pakistan. The first Union Council Chairman of this village was Malik Khuadad Khan, who was a well known person of this area and a well known farmer. Sohan's geographical coordinates are 33° 39' 0" North, 73° 6' 0" East. It is a place where mostly livestock farms are situated, such as BizWhiz Livestock Private Limited Farms.
