= Tumair =

- Coordinates: 33°41′N 73°16′E
- Country: Pakistan
- Province: Islamabad Capital Territory

Tumair Sharif (in Urdu تمير شریف) is Town and Union Council (UC) situated in the Islamabad Capital Territory of Pakistan.

Simly Dam, the main source of water supply to the capital city is situated in the east of Tumair.

== Introduction ==
Tumair Sharif is located in Zone-IV of the Islamabad, the zone is the largest in term of its area and is mainly designed for farm houses and the main income source is property dealing and farming.
