= High courts of Pakistan =

Courts in pakistan

There are five high courts of Pakistan, of which four are based in the capital cities of the four provinces, and the fifth in the federal capital, Islamabad. Articles 192 to 203 of the Constitution of Pakistan outline the constitution of the courts, appointment of the judges, their oath of office, and jurisdiction of the high courts.

== History ==
At the time of partition of India in August 1947, the Lahore High Court, the Dacca High Court, the Chief Court of Sind and the Judicial Commissioner's Court in the North-West Frontier Province were deemed to be the four high courts of Pakistan.

In 1955, the Dacca High Court and the Lahore High Court became the High Court of East Pakistan and the High Court of West Pakistan, respectively. The West Pakistan High Court had benches at Karachi and Peshawar as well as circuit courts at Quetta (replacing the Judicial Commissioner in Balochistan) and Bahawalpur (replacing the High Court of Judicature at Baghdad-ul-Jadid).

As the province of West Pakistan was dissolved in 1970, three high courts were established: Lahore High Court, Peshawar High Court, and Sind and Balochistan High Court (with its principal seat at Karachi).

In 1976 the Sindh and Balochistan High Court was split into the High Court of Sind (Karachi) and the High Court of Balochistan (Quetta).

In 1985 the Lahore High Court had Benches at Bahawalpur, Multan and Rawalpindi; the High Court of Sind at Sukkur; the Peshawar High Court at Abbottabad and Dera Ismail Khan and the High Court of Baluchistan at Sibi.

In 2007, the government proposed a fifth high court to cover the Islamabad Capital Territory. This proposal was blocked by the Lahore High Court, but the decision was overturned by the Supreme Court of Pakistan on 24 December 2007. As a result of the 18th constitutional amendment, the Islamabad High Court was established in 2010. The amendment also established the Mingora Bench of the Peshawar High Court and the Turbat Bench of the High Court of Baluchistan.

== List of high courts ==
High court	Province	Principal seat	Benches	Established
Lahore High Court	Punjab	Lahore	Bahawalpur, Multan, Rawalpindi	1866
Sindh High Court	Sindh	Karachi	Sukkur, Hyderabad, Larkana, Mirpurkhas	1866
Peshawar High Court	Khyber Pakhtunkhwa	Peshawar	Abbottabad, Mingora, Dera Ismail Khan, Bannu	1901
Balochistan High Court	Balochistan	Quetta	Sibi, Turbat	1976
Islamabad High Court	Capital Territory	Islamabad		2010

=== Autonomous territories high courts ===
High court	Territory	Principal seat	Benches
Azad Kashmir High Court	Azad Kashmir	Muzaffarabad	Kotli, Mirpur, Rawalakot
Gilgit-Baltistan Chief Court	Gilgit-Baltistan	Gilgit	Skardu

== See also ==
- District courts of Pakistan
- Anti Terrorism Court of Pakistan
