= Phulgran =

- Union Council
- Location within Pakistan
- Coordinates: 33.45°N 73.13°E
- Country: Pakistan
- Province: Islamabad Capital Territory
- Time zone: UTC+5 (PST)

Phulgran is a village and union council situated in the Islamabad Capital Territory of Pakistan. Its geographical coordinates are 33° 45' 0" North, 73° 13' 0" East and its original name (with diacritics) is Phulgrān.

The jurisdiction of Phulgran includes the following towns:

- Phulgran
- Shahpur
- Sakrila
- Dohala
- Babbri Petha
- Athal
- Maira Begwal
- Chattar
- Karlot
- Hotran
- Kathar
- Mangal
- Pind Begwal
- Chaniari
- Rakh Maira A & B
