= Jagiot =

Jagiot جگیوٹ
- Location within Pakistan
- Coordinates: 33.40°N 73.12°E
- Country: Pakistan
- Province: Islamabad Capital Territory
- Elevation: 555 m (1,821 ft)
- Time zone: UTC+5 (PST)

Jagiot,(ٗUrdu جگیوٹ) is a village located in the Islamabad Capital Territory of Pakistan. It is located with an altitude of 555 m (1,821 ft).
