= District courts of Pakistan =

Courts of Pakistan

The district courts of Pakistan are courts that operate at the district level. They are supervised and controlled by their respective high courts.

District courts exist in every district of each province, with civil and criminal jurisdiction. In each district headquarters, there are numerous additional district and session judges who usually preside over the courts. District and sessions judges have executive and judicial power all over the district under their jurisdiction. Session court is also a trial court for heinous offences such as murder, rape (Zina), Haraba offences (armed robbery where a specific amount of gold and cash is involved), it is also appellate court for summary conviction offences and civil suits of lesser value. Each town and city now has a court of additional district and sessions judge, which possesses equal authority over its jurisdiction. When it is hearing criminal cases it is called sessions court and when it is hearing civil cases it becomes a district court. Executive matters are brought before the relevant district and sessions judge.

- The high court of each province has appellate jurisdiction over the lower courts.
- The Supreme Court has exclusive jurisdiction over disputes between and among provincial governments, and appellate jurisdiction over high court decisions.

== See also ==
- Islamabad District Court
