= Badhana Kalan =

Coordinates: 33°37′N 72°55′E

Badhana Kalan-UC-46
- Union Council
- Interactive map of Badhana Kalan-UC-46
- Country: Pakistan
- Province: (Islamabad Capital Territory) Islamabad C.T
- Time zone: UTC+5 (PST)

Badhana Kalan is a union council in the Islamabad Capital Territory of Pakistan. The Division Code is 04 (Punjab).
