= Lohi Bhair =

- Union Council
- Interactive map of Lohi Bhair
- Coordinates: 33.582°N 73.163°E
- Country: Pakistan
- Province: (Islamabad Capital Territory) Islamabad C.T
- Time zone: UTC+5 (PST)

Lohi Bhair is a union council in the Islamabad Capital Territory of Pakistan.
