= Islamabad Capital Territory =

Federal territory of Pakistan

Islamabad Capital Territory اسلام آباد وفاقی دارالحکومت
- Federal territory
- Islamabad Capital Territory
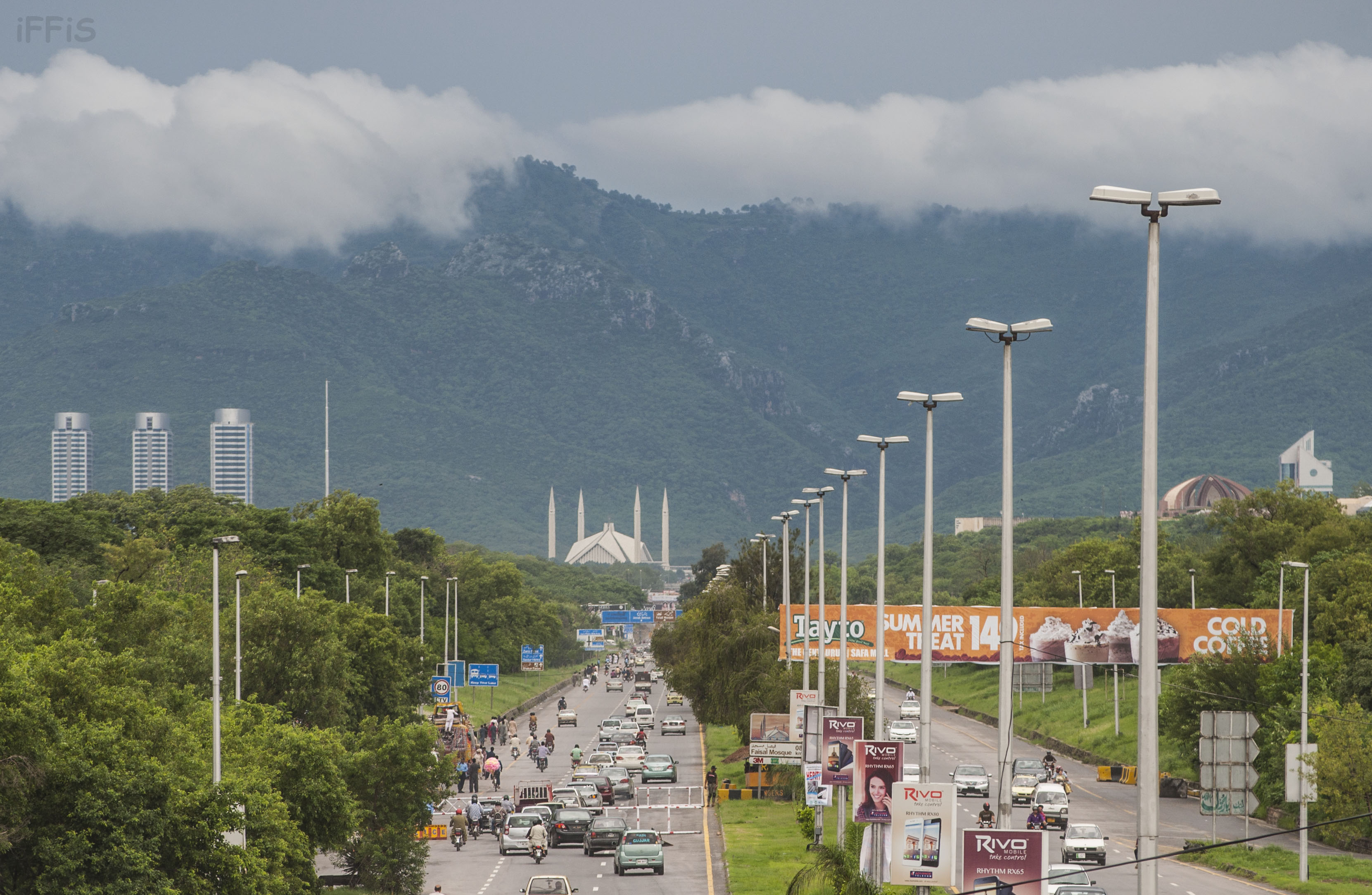
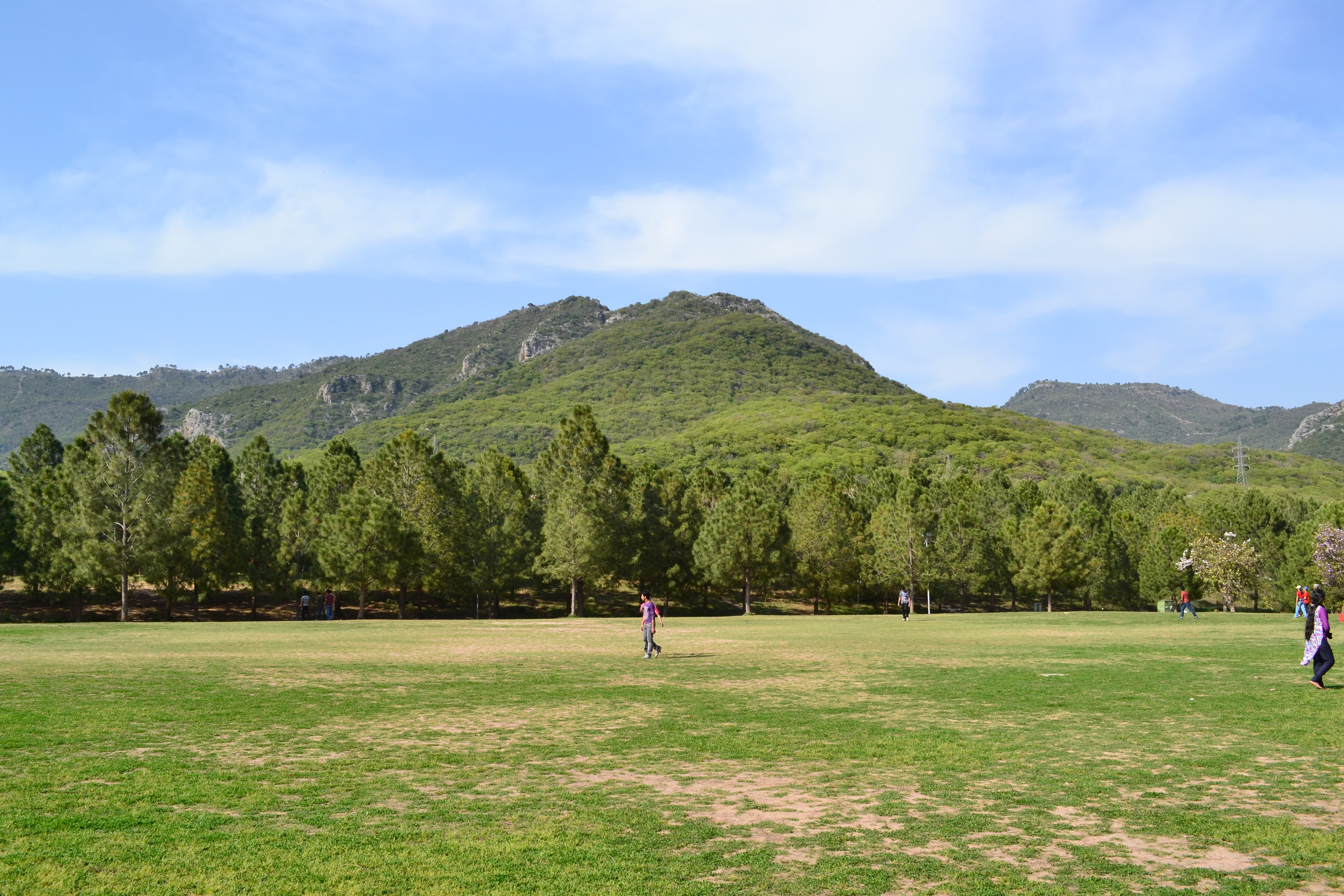
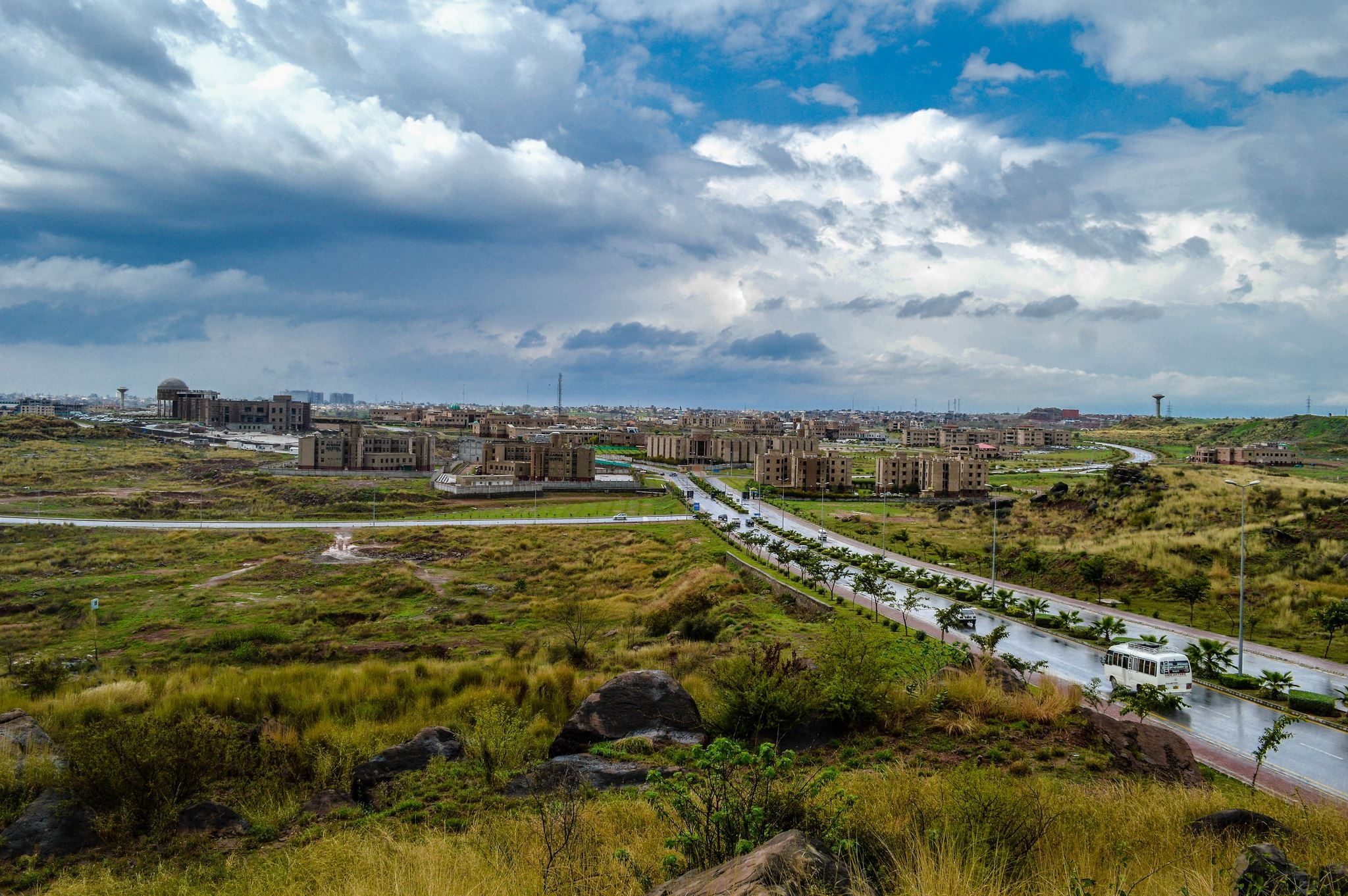
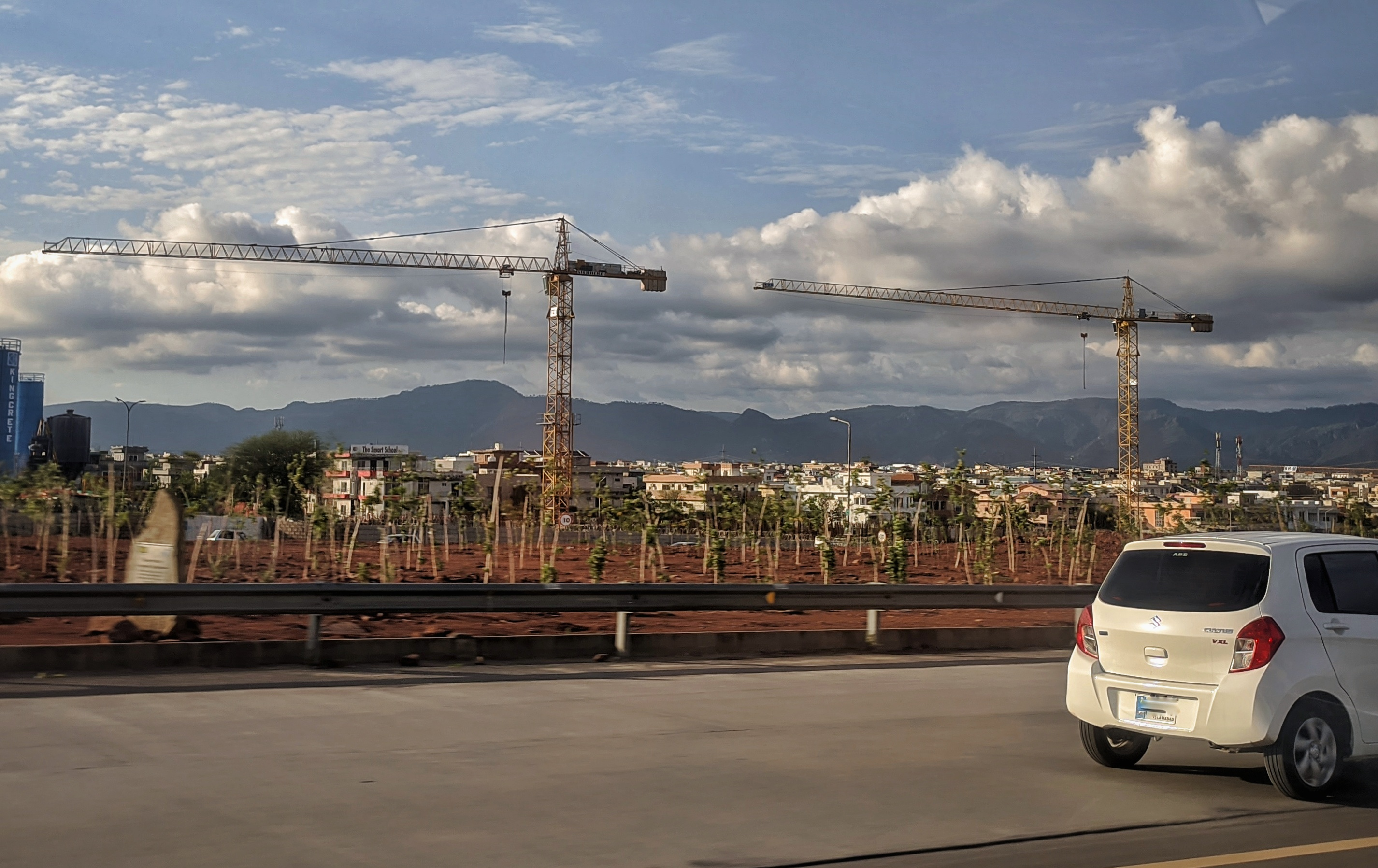
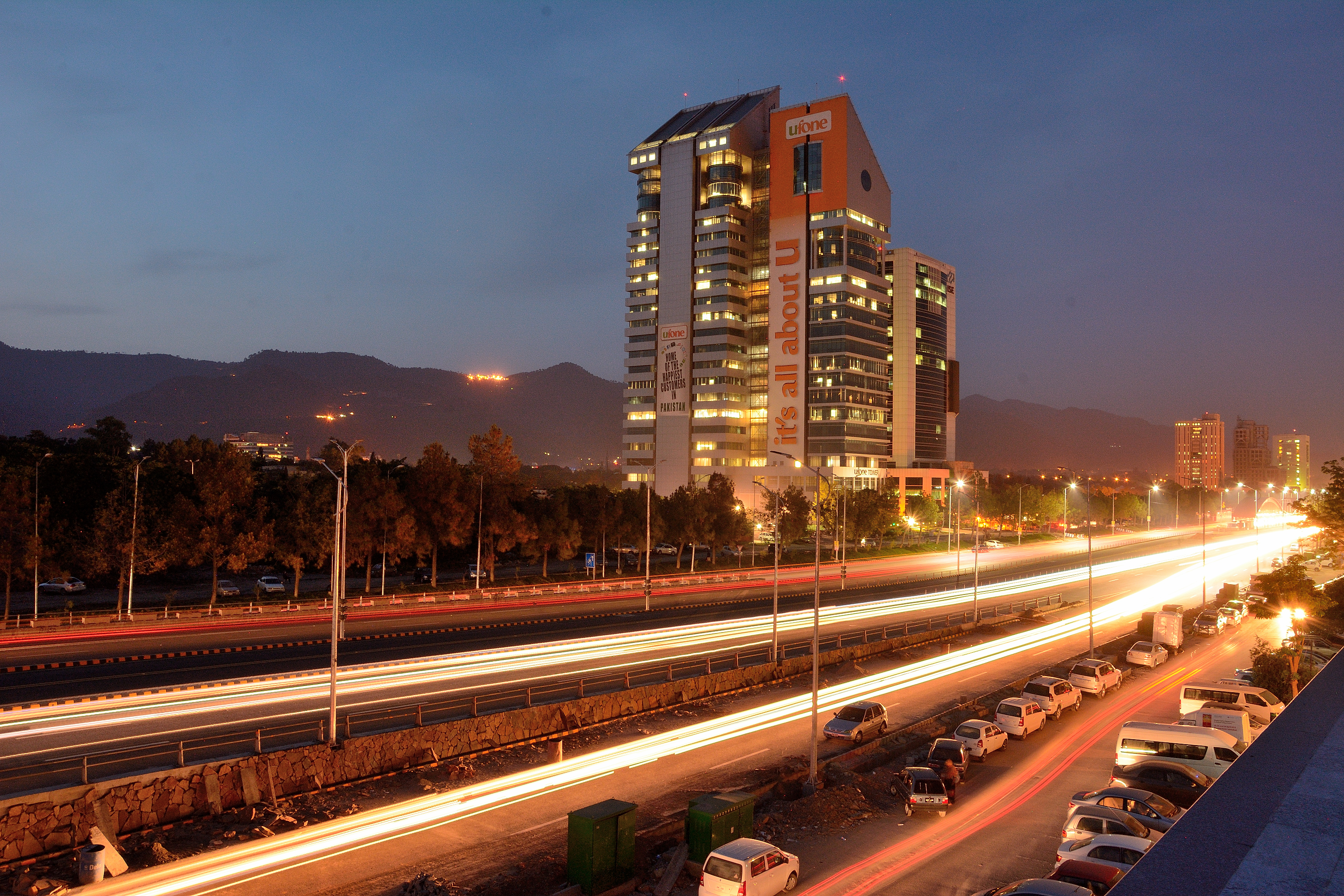
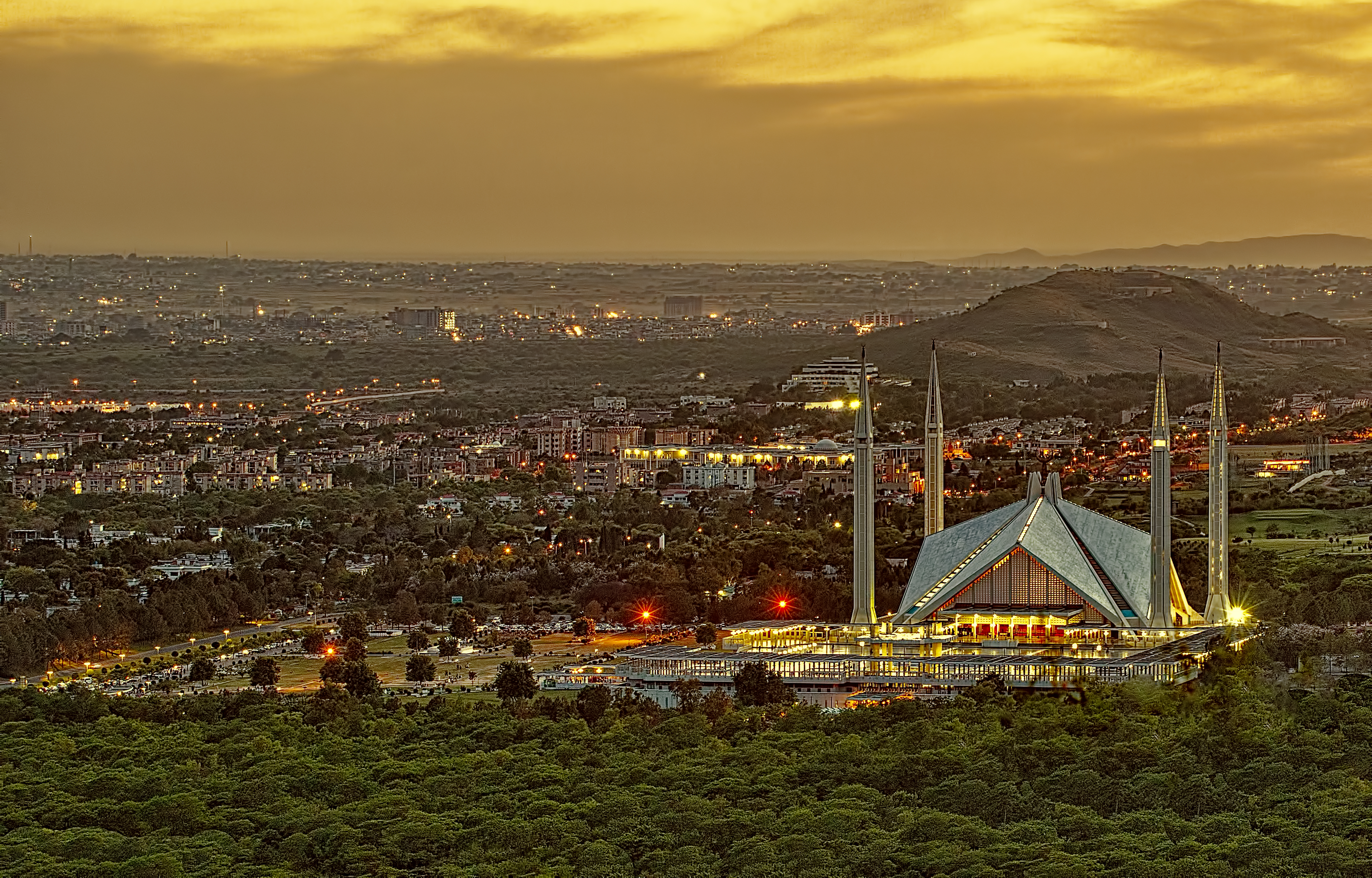
- Islamabad Expressway Margalla Hills Sector H-12 Sector G-13 Blue Area Cityscape of Islamabad

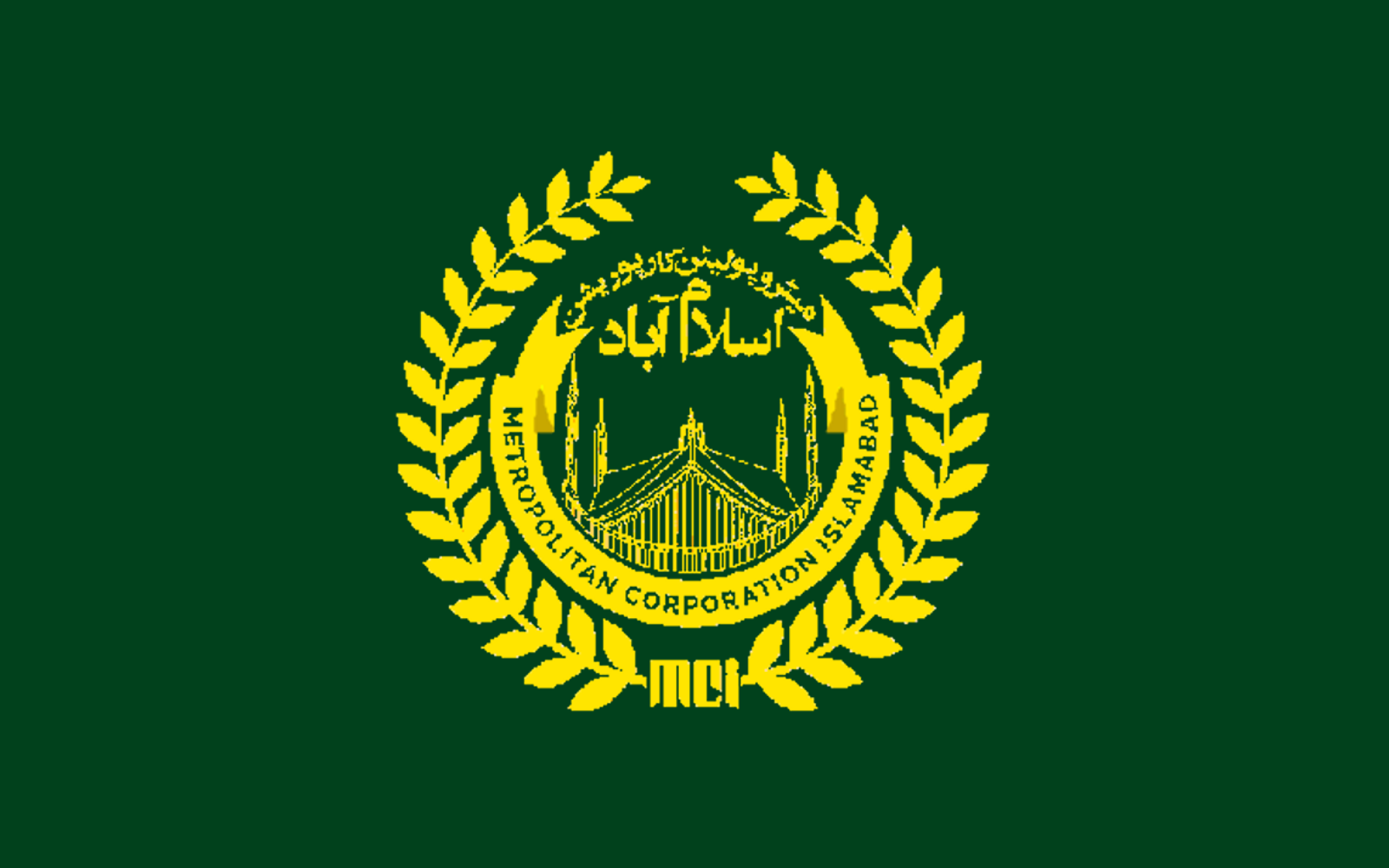
- Flag

- Location within Pakistan

- Location within Islamabad Capital Territory
- Coordinates: 33°44′15″N 73°08′51″E
- Country: Pakistan
- Established: 14 August 1967; 59 years ago
- Capital: Islamabad

Government
  - Type: Federally-administered territory
  - Body: ICT Administration; Government of the ICT
  - Chief Commissioner: Shehbaz Sharif (PAS)
  - Deputy Commissioner: Irfan Nawaz Memon
  - CDA Chairman: Amer Ali Ahmed
  - High Court: Islamabad High Court

Area
  - Federal territory: 906.50 km^{2} (350.00 sq mi)
- Highest elevation: 1,500 m (4,900 ft)
- Lowest elevation: 490 m (1,610 ft)

Population (2023)
  - Federal territory: 2,363,863
  - Density: 2,609.1/km^{2} (6,758/sq mi)
  - Urban: 1,108,872 (46.91%)
  - Rural: 1,254,991

GDP
  - Federal territory of Pakistan: $12.8 billion (2024)
- Time zone: UTC+05:00 (PKT)
- Postcode: 44000
- Area code: 051
- ISO 3166 code: PK-IS
- HDI (2025): 0.924; Very High (1st) (Note: Within Pakistan, ICT has the highest HDI of all subdivisions of the country.)
- Literacy rate (2025): 97.97%
- Seats in National Assembly: 3
- Main language(s): Official languages: Urdu; English; Other spoken-languages: Punjabi; Pashto; Kashmiri; Sindhi; Balti; Shina; Kohistani; Balochi
- Notable sports teams: Islamabad United, Islamabad Jinns
- Zones: 5
- Sectors: 81
- Union Councils: 50
- Website: ictadministration.gov.pk

The Islamabad Capital Territory (Note: ICT; Urdu: اسلام‌آباد وفاقی دارالحکومت, romanised: Islāmābād Vafāqī Dār-alhakūmat) is a federal territory of Pakistan, centred around Islamabad, the capital of Pakistan. It is located on the northern edge of the Pothohar Plateau, at the foot of the Margalla Hills, in the northwestern Punjab region. (Note: Punjab here means the historic region of Punjab, of which the territory is a part.) The Territory shares borders with the province of Khyber Pakhtunkhwa in the west and the other districts of the province of Punjab in the remaining directions. It covers an area of 906.5 square kilometres (350.0 mi^{2}) and, according to 2023 census, has a population of over 2.3 million.

Islamabad Capital Territory has been a part of Punjab Province ever since, though federally administered. The latest official political map of Pakistan released in 2020, as well as many older official maps, shows it as part of Punjab Province.

The area was separated from Rawalpindi District in 1967 to form a separate territory administered by the federal government. The territory is represented in the National Assembly by NA-52, NA-53, and NA-54 constituencies and by four seats in the Senate.

== History ==
In 1960, land was transferred from the Rawalpindi District of Punjab province to replace the Karachi Federal Capital Territory and establish Pakistan's new capital. According to the 1960s master plan, the territory included much of what was Rawalpindi, and composed of the following parts:

- Rawalpindi, 259 square kilometres (100 sq mi)
- Islamabad Urban, 220.15 square kilometres (85.00 sq mi)
- Margalla Hills, 220.15 square kilometres (85.00 sq mi)
- Islamabad Rural, 466.20 square kilometres (180.00 sq mi)

However, Rawalpindi was eventually excluded from the Islamabad master plan in the 1980s.

== Geography ==
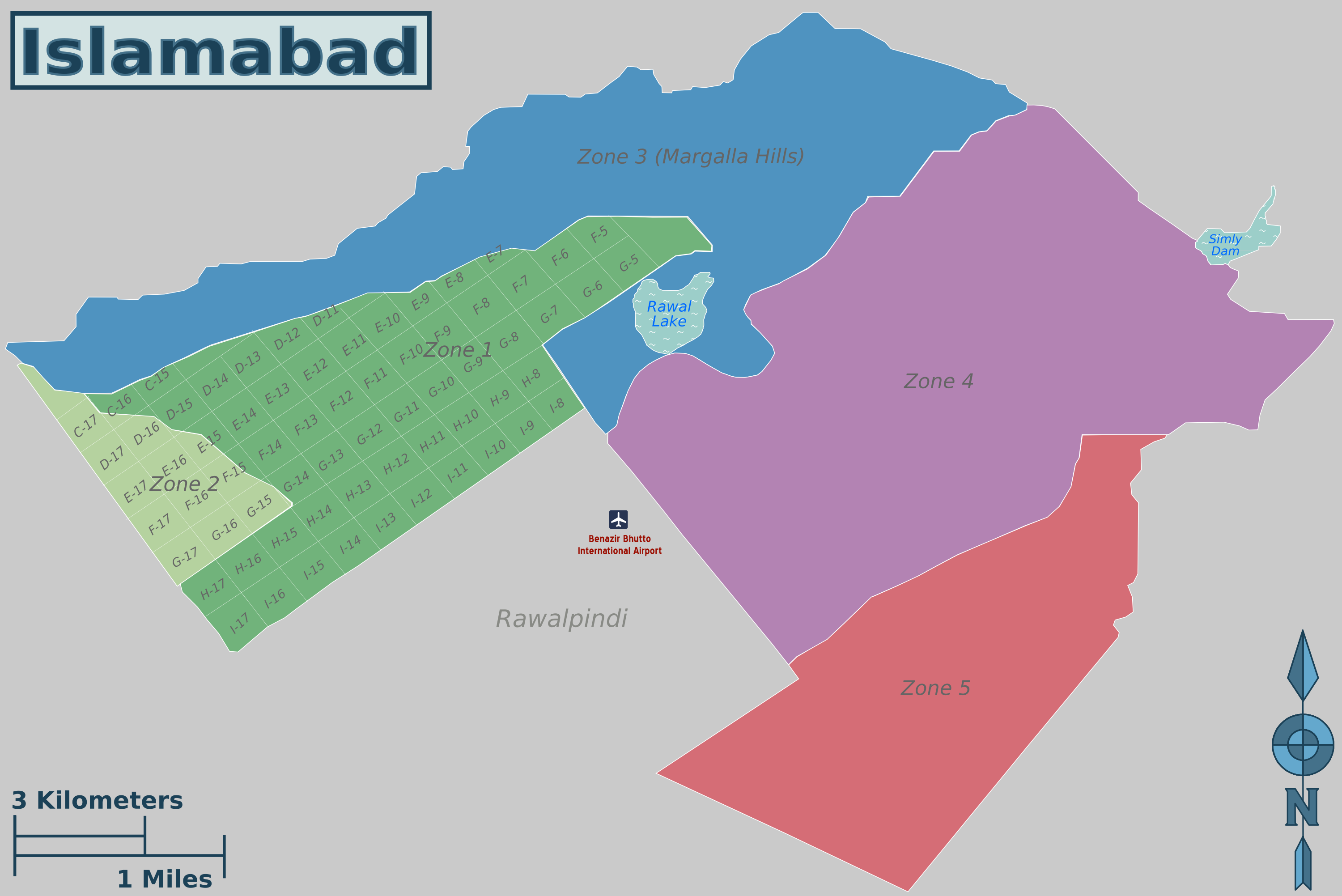
The five zones and sectors of Islamabad

The Islamabad Capital Territory is composed of eight types of areas: administrative, commercial, diplomatic, educational, green, industrial, residential, and rural.

=== Zones ===
Map showing the five zones of the Islamabad Capital Territory

The territory is divided into five zones in two groups:

- Zone I: for urban development and federal government institutions
- Zone II: for urban development
- Zone III: for rural development
- Zone IV: for rural development
- Zone V: for rural development

Zone I consists mainly of all the developed residential sectors, while Zone II consists of the under-developed residential sectors. Each residential sector is identified by a letter of the alphabet and a number, and covers an area of approximately 4 square kilometres. The sectors are lettered from A to I, and each sector is divided into four numbered sub-sectors. Zone IV is the largest in area.

=== Sectors ===
Series A, B, and C are still underdeveloped. The D series has seven sectors (D-11 to D-17), of which only sector D-12 is completely developed. This series is located at the foot of Margalla Hills. The E Sectors are named from E-7 to E-17. Many foreigners and diplomatic personnel are housed in these sectors. In the revised Master Plan of the city, CDA has decided to develop a park on the pattern of Fatima Jinnah Park in sector E-14. Sectors E-8 and E-9 contain the campuses of Bahria University, Air University, and the National Defence University. The F and G series contains the most developed sectors. F series contains sectors F-5 to F-17; some sectors are still under-developed. F-5 is an important sector for the software industry in Islamabad, as the two software technology parks are located here. The entire F-9 sector is covered with Fatima Jinnah Park. The Centaurus complex will be one of the major landmarks of the F-8 sector. G sectors are numbered G-5 through G-17. Some important places include the Jinnah Convention Center and Serena Hotel in G-5, the Red Mosque in G-6, and the Pakistan Institute of Medical Sciences, the largest medical complex in the capital, located in G-8.

The H sectors are numbered H-8 through H-17. The H sectors are mostly dedicated to educational and health institutions. National University of Sciences and Technology covers a major portion of sector H-12. The I sectors are numbered from I-8 to I-18. With the exception of I-8, which is a well-developed residential area, these sectors are primarily part of the industrial zone. Currently two sub-sectors of I-9 and one sub-sector of I-10 are used as industrial areas. CDA is planning to set up Islamabad Railway Station in Sector I-18 and Industrial City in sector I-17. Zone III consists primarily of the Margalla Hills and Margalla Hills National Park. Rawal Lake is in this zone. Zone IV and V consist of Islamabad Park, and rural areas of the city. The Soan River flows into the city through Zone V.

== Climate ==
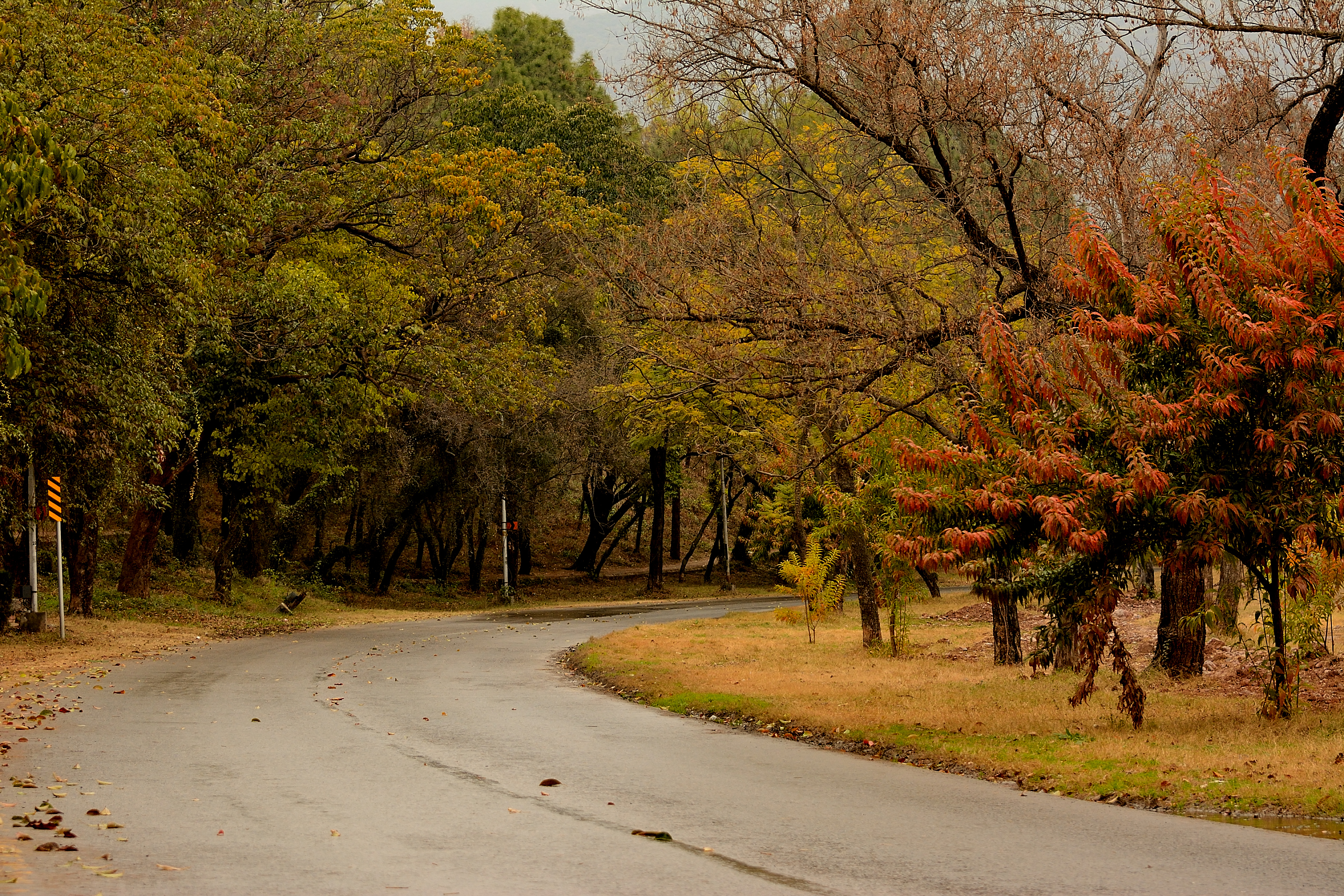
Islamabad's deciduous trees colours in autumn, Atatürk Avenue

=== Seasons ===
The climate of Islamabad has a humid subtropical climate (Köppen: Cwa), with five seasons: winter (November–February), spring (March and April), summer (May and June), rainy monsoon (July and August), and autumn (September and October).

=== Temperatures ===
The temperatures range from 13 °C (55 °F) in January to 38 °C (100 °F) in June. The hottest month is June, where average highs routinely exceed 38 °C (100.4 °F), while the coolest month is January. The highest recorded temperature was 46.6 °C (115.9 °F) on 23 June 2005 while the lowest temperature was −6 °C (21.2 °F) on 17 January 1967. Winters generally feature dense fog in the mornings and sunny afternoons. In the city, temperatures stay mild, with snowfall over the higher elevations points on nearby hill stations, notably Murree and Nathia Gali.

=== Precipitation ===
The wettest month is July, with heavy rainfalls and evening thunderstorms with the possibility of cloudburst and flooding. Highest monthly rainfall of 743.3 millimetres (29.26 in) was recorded during July 1995. On 23 July 2001, Islamabad received a record breaking 620 millimetres (24 in) of rainfall in just 10 hours. It was the heaviest rainfall in Islamabad in the past 100 years and the highest rainfall in 24 hours as well. The city has also experienced snowfall on a number of occasions. Islamabad's micro-climate is regulated by three artificial reservoirs: Rawal, Simli, and Khanpur Dam. The latter is located on the Haro River near the town of Khanpur, about 40 kilometres (25 mi) from Islamabad. Simli Dam is 30 kilometres (19 mi) north of Islamabad.

=== Vegetation ===
Around 220 acres (89 ha) of the city consists of the Margalla Hills National Park, while the Loi Bher Forest is situated along the Islamabad Highway, covering an area of 1,087 acres (440 ha).

Climate data for Islamabad (1991–2020 normals)
Month	Jan	Feb	Mar	Apr	May	Jun	Jul	Aug	Sep	Oct	Nov	Dec	Year
Record high °C (°F)	30.1 (86.2)	30.0 (86.0)	37.0 (98.6)	44.0 (111.2)	45.6 (114.1)	46.6 (115.9)	45.0 (113.0)	42.0 (107.6)	38.1 (100.6)	38.0 (100.4)	32.2 (90.0)	28.3 (82.9)	46.6 (115.9)
Mean daily maximum °C (°F)	17.7 (63.9)	20.0 (68.0)	24.8 (76.6)	30.6 (87.1)	36.1 (97.0)	38.3 (100.9)	35.4 (95.7)	33.9 (93.0)	33.4 (92.1)	30.9 (87.6)	25.4 (77.7)	20.4 (68.7)	28.9 (84.0)
Daily mean °C (°F)	10.7 (51.3)	13.4 (56.1)	18.1 (64.6)	23.6 (74.5)	28.7 (83.7)	31.4 (88.5)	30.1 (86.2)	29.1 (84.4)	27.6 (81.7)	23.3 (73.9)	17.3 (63.1)	12.5 (54.5)	22.2 (72.0)
Mean daily minimum °C (°F)	3.6 (38.5)	6.8 (44.2)	11.4 (52.5)	16.6 (61.9)	21.5 (70.7)	24.5 (76.1)	24.9 (76.8)	24.2 (75.6)	21.7 (71.1)	15.6 (60.1)	9.1 (48.4)	4.7 (40.5)	15.4 (59.7)
Record low °C (°F)	−6 (21)	−5.0 (23.0)	−3.8 (25.2)	2.1 (35.8)	5.5 (41.9)	13.0 (55.4)	15.2 (59.4)	14.5 (58.1)	13.3 (55.9)	5.7 (42.3)	−0.6 (30.9)	−2.8 (27.0)	−6.0 (21.2)
Average precipitation mm (inches)	55.2 (2.17)	93.4 (3.68)	95.2 (3.75)	58.1 (2.29)	39.9 (1.57)	78.4 (3.09)	310.6 (12.23)	317.0 (12.48)	135.4 (5.33)	34.4 (1.35)	17.7 (0.70)	25.9 (1.02)	1,261.2 (49.65)
Average precipitation days (≥ 1.0 mm)	4.7	6.3	7.3	6.1	5.2	6.0	12.3	11.9	6.4	2.9	2.0	2.0	73.1
Average relative humidity (%)	67	63	62	52	42	44	68	76	67	62	63	66	61
Mean monthly sunshine hours	195.7	187.1	202.3	252.4	319.0	300.1	264.4	250.7	262.2	275.5	247.9	195.6	2,952.9
Mean daily sunshine hours	6.3	6.6	6.5	8.4	10.1	10.0	8.5	8.1	8.7	8.9	8.3	6.3	8.1
Source 1: NOAA (sun, 1961-1990), Deutscher Wetterdienst (humidity 1973-1990, daily sun 1961-1990)
Source 2: PMD (extremes)

== Government ==
The government of the Islamabad Capital Territory is provided by the federal Government of Pakistan and by a number of territorial bodies. Article 258 of the Constitution of Pakistan stipulates that the President of Pakistan is responsible for establishing the government of the federal capital and the Parliament of Pakistan makes laws for the territory. Although the federal government retains strategic power over the territory, the day to day government is carried out by a number of bodies, which have been established over the years.

The Capital Development Authority (CDA), established on 14 June 1960, was responsible for building the capital and continues to have some government roles. The Islamabad Capital Territory Administration (ICTA) was established in 1980, and is led by a Chief Commissioner, who holds powers similar to a provincial government. The Islamabad High Court, established in 2007 (dissolved in 2008, re-established in 2010) is the senior court of the territory and is equivalent to the four provincial high courts. The Islamabad Metropolitan Corporation (MCI), established in 2015, is the municipal authority and is equivalent to a district government, as the upper tier of the local government in the territory. The CDA has been gradually transferring many of its roles to the MCI.

At the most local level, there are 101 union councils, though this is due to increase to 125 councils.

=== Union councils ===
At the most local level, the Territory comprises 101 union councils, though this is due to increase to 125 Union councils.

Incomplete list of union councils
UC #	Chief locality	Localities within jurisdiction
1	Saidpur	Said Pur, Gokina, Talhar
2	Noorpur Shahan	Noorpur Shahan, Ratta Hutar
3	Mal Pur	Mal Pur, Romali, Nariyas, Phadu, Shahdrah Khurd, Shahdrah Kalan, Mandala, Jang Begial, Subban Syedan, Mangial, Quaid-e-Azam University
4	Kot Hathial (Shamal)	Kot Hathial, Bhara Kahu, Nayiabadi, Muhallah Alnoor, Muhallah Ban, Muhallah Malkan, Dhok Syedan
5	Kot Hathial (Janoob)	Kot Hathial, Nainsukh, Barakahu, Behra Syedan, Muhallah Ghousia, Sharak-e-Madina, Dhok Jilani, Muhallah Malikabad
6	Phulgran	Phulgran, Phul Garan, Dhok Kuch, Abbasiabad, Dhok Badhan, Muhallah Kangar, Mahallah Ranjpuran, Shahpur, Bobry, Karlot Chattar, Mohra Rajpoota, Muhallah Sumbul, Bani Gala
7	Pind Begwal	Pind Begwal, Bainala, Maira Biguwal, Atthal, Dhok Sajjal, Dhok Nanda Sihali, Jandala, Simli
8	Tumair	Tumair, Pihont, Chakhtan, Darkalam, Kanjnah
9	Charah	Charah, Dhok Maira, Dhok Las, Kiani, Dhok Haveli
10	Kirpa	Kirpa, Ladhiot Syedan, Pind Malikan, Dhok Ban, Bhimbar Tarar, Mahallah Haveli Rajgan, Mehfozabad, Chaniol, Muhallah Chaudrian, Ara, Gora Mast, Dhok Jogian Harnu, Chauntra Sogran
11	Mughal	Mughal, Hardoghar, Kangota Gujjran Sihala, Hondamial, Nara Syedan, Chuchkal Chakiyan, Chak Kamdar
12	Rawat	Rawat, Bhangrial Kalan, Banni Saran, Mohra Nagial, Sawan, Bagga Shaikhan
13	Humak	Humak, Kaniyal, Gora Syedan, Niazian
14	Sihala	Sihala Khurd, Maira Dakhli, Bhandar Sihala, Jarki Sihala, Gagri Sihala, Jhundla, Kangota Syedan, Gura Mistriyan
15	Lohi Bhair	Lohi Bhar, Shahrak-e-Korang, Bagh-e-Sawan, Shahrak-e-Pakistan
16	Darwala	Darwala, Dhaliala, Panwal, Chucha Sheikhiyan, Bhair, Kanghar, Sher Ghamial, Dhok Kavgar, Kathrial, Chucha, Dhok Kashimiriya, Harn maira, Malali, Bun koutha, Pahg Panwal, Farash, Bangiyal
17	Koral	Koral, Tarlai Khurd, Gangal, Chaklala, Shareefabad, Gohra Sardar, Tarlai
18	Khana Dak	Khana Dak, Dhok Jabba, Pindorian, Shahrak-e-Bilal, Shahrak-e-Barma, Shahrak-e-Madina, Muhallah Wahid Abad, Shahrak-e-Masih)
19	Tarlai Kalan	Tarlai Kalan, Irfanabad, Chappar Meer Khanal, Sahana
20	Ali Pur	Ali Pur, Alipur, Jhang Syedan, Partal, Khadrapar, Farash,
21	Sohan	Sohan Dehati, Khana Kak, Shakrial, Shakrial (Sharki)
22	Chak Shahzad	Chak Shahzad, Chak Bihra Shigh, Jaba Teli, Sohana, Pandori, Chhatta Bakhtawar, Bohan, Dhoke Sharaf, Mujuhan
23	Kuri	Kuri, Malot, Rakh Bani Gala, Rihara, Mohra Jujan
24	Shahrak-e-Rawal	Shahrak-e-Rawal, Shahrak-e-Margala, Sumbal Korakh, Puna Faqeeran, Mohrian
25	Sector F-6	F-6/1, F-6/2, F-6/3, F-6/4, Farooqi Bazar, Madni Masjid, Dhobi Gat
26	Sector G-6/1	
27	Sector G-6	Sector G-6/2, Sector G-6/3 & Sector G-6/4
28	Sector F-7, F-8, F-9	
29	Sector F-10, F-11	
30	Sector G-7/3, G-7/4	
31	Sector G-7/1, G-7/2	
32	Sector G-8/3, G-8/4	
33	Sector G-8/1, G-8/2	
34	Sector G-9	Sector G-9/1, G-9/3, G-9/4
35	Sector G-9/2	
36	Sector G-10/3, G-10/4	
37	Sector G-10/1, G-10/2	
38	Sector G-11	Sector G-11/1, G-11/2, G-11/3, G-11/4
39	Maira Sumbal Jaffar	Maira Sumbal Jaffar, Golra Sharif, Badia Rusmat Khan, Maira Akku, Dhareek Mohri, Shahrak-e-Effaq
40	G-13	
40	Sector I-8	Sector I-8/1, I8/2, I8/3, I8/4
41	Sector I-9	
42	Sector I-10/1	
43	Sector I-10	Sector I-10/2, I-10/3, I-10/4
44	Bokra	Bokra, Haji Complex, Soria Harboza, Mouza Sorain, Peer Wadhai, Shahrak-e-Iqbal
45	Jhangi Saydan	
46	Village Noon	Badhana Kalan, Dhoke Makhan, ETC
47	Tarnol	
48	Sarai Kharbooza	
49	Shah Allah Ditta	
50	Golra Sharif	

== Demographics ==
=== Population ===
Historical population
Year	Pop.	±% p.a.
1951	95,940	—
1961	117,669	+2.06%
1972	237,549	+6.59%
1981	340,286	+4.07%
1998	805,235	+5.20%
2017	2,003,368	+4.91%
2023	2,363,863	+2.80%

According to the 2023 Census, Islamabad Capital Territory had a population of 2,363,863.

=== Language ===
Languages of Islamabad Capital Territory (2023 Pakistani census)
1. Punjabi (50.6%)
2. Pashto (18.2%)
3. Urdu (15.7%)
4. Hindko (6.16%)
5. Kashmiri (2.27%)
6. Saraiki (2.02%)
7. Sindhi (0.93%)
8. Balti (0.34%)
9. Shina (0.31%)
10. Kohistani (0.21%)
11. Balochi (0.19%)
12. Others (2.92%)

According to 2023 Pakistani census, there are 1,154,540 Punjabi, 415,838 Pashto, 358,922 Urdu, 140,780 Hindko, 51,920 Kashmiri, 46,270 Saraiki, 21,362 Sindhi, 10,315 Balti, 7,099 Shina, 5,016 Koshistani, 4,503 Balochi, 1,095 Mewati, 668 Brahvi, 182 Kalasha and 64,734 others, of total 2,283,244 speakers.

After Islamabad's establishment, people from all around Pakistan shifted here which led to a diverse demographics. Punjabis constitute the largest ethnolinguistic population in the territory, with many having settled here from Punjab province as well. Pothwari dialect, which has been regarded by many as the dialect of Punjabi, has historically been the indigenous language of the region; and Punjabi still continues to be the most-widely spoken first language in Islamabad, with Punjabi-speakers forming a majority of the population. Punjabi is spoken in the form of many dialects and varieties, including the Majhi, Dhani, Shahpuri, Jhangvi, and Doabi dialects.

=== Religion ===
Religion in Islamabad Territory, Pakistan
1. Islam (97.1%)
2. Christianity (2.80%)
3. Ahmadiyya (0.10%)
4. Others (0.08%)

Islam is the largest and most practiced religion in the territory, with just over 97% of the population adhering to the faith. Christianity is the second largest religion and forms 2.8% of the population. Ahmadis make up 0.11% of the population. Other minorities, like Sikhs and Hindus, form just 0.2% combined.

Hindu population in Islamabad is very small as per census, around 900, but other sources estimates it to be around 3000. The territory also hosts the historic important and sacred Ram mandir.

== Islamabad-Rawalpindi metropolitan area ==
When the master plan for Islamabad was drawn up in 1960, Islamabad and Rawalpindi, along with the adjoining areas, was to be integrated to form a large metropolitan area called Islamabad/Rawalpindi Metropolitan Area. The area would consist of the developing Islamabad, the old colonial cantonment city of Rawalpindi, and Margalla Hills National Park, including surrounding rural areas. However, Islamabad city is part of the Islamabad Capital Territory, while Rawalpindi is part of Rawalpindi District, which is part of province of Punjab.

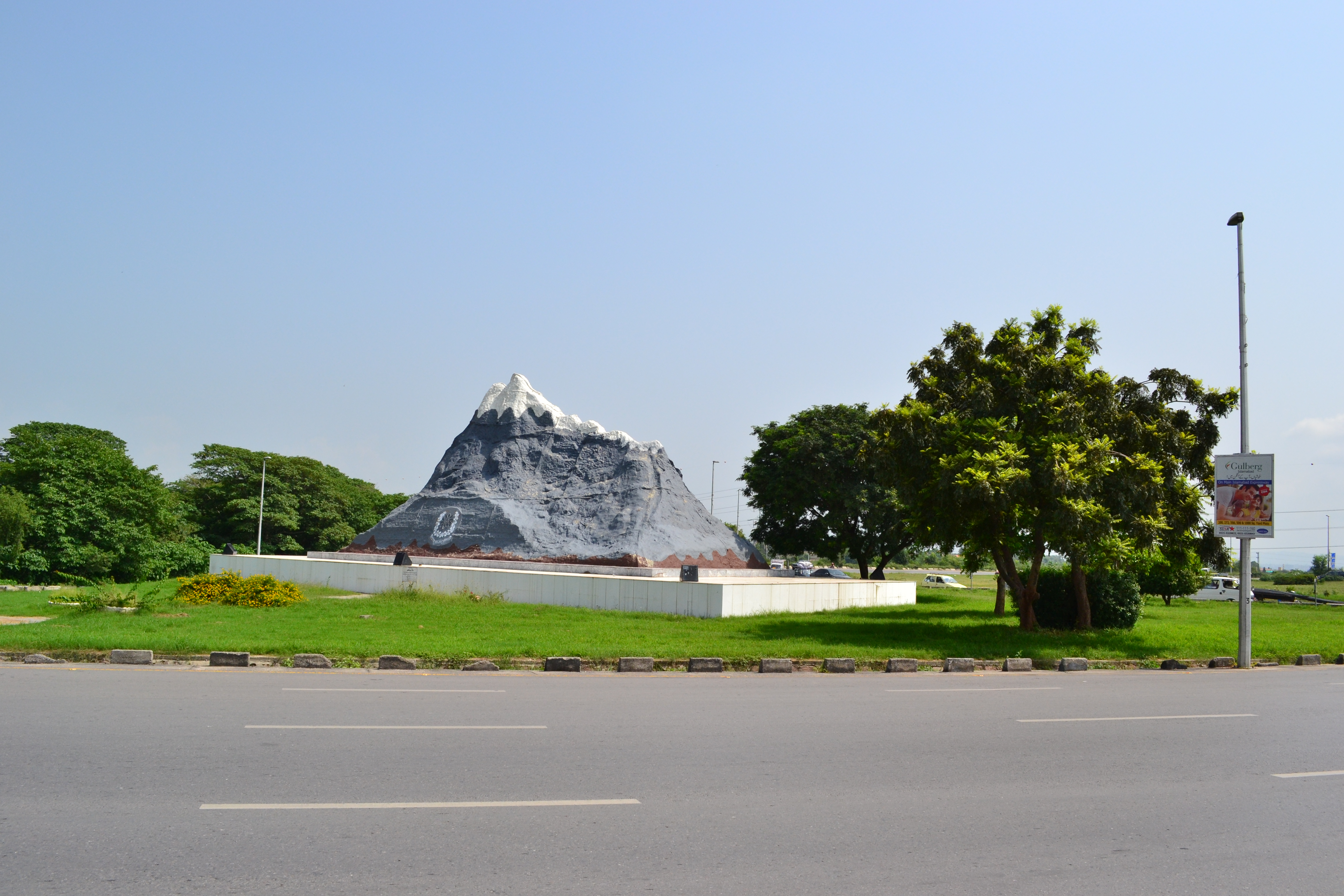
Chaghi Monument

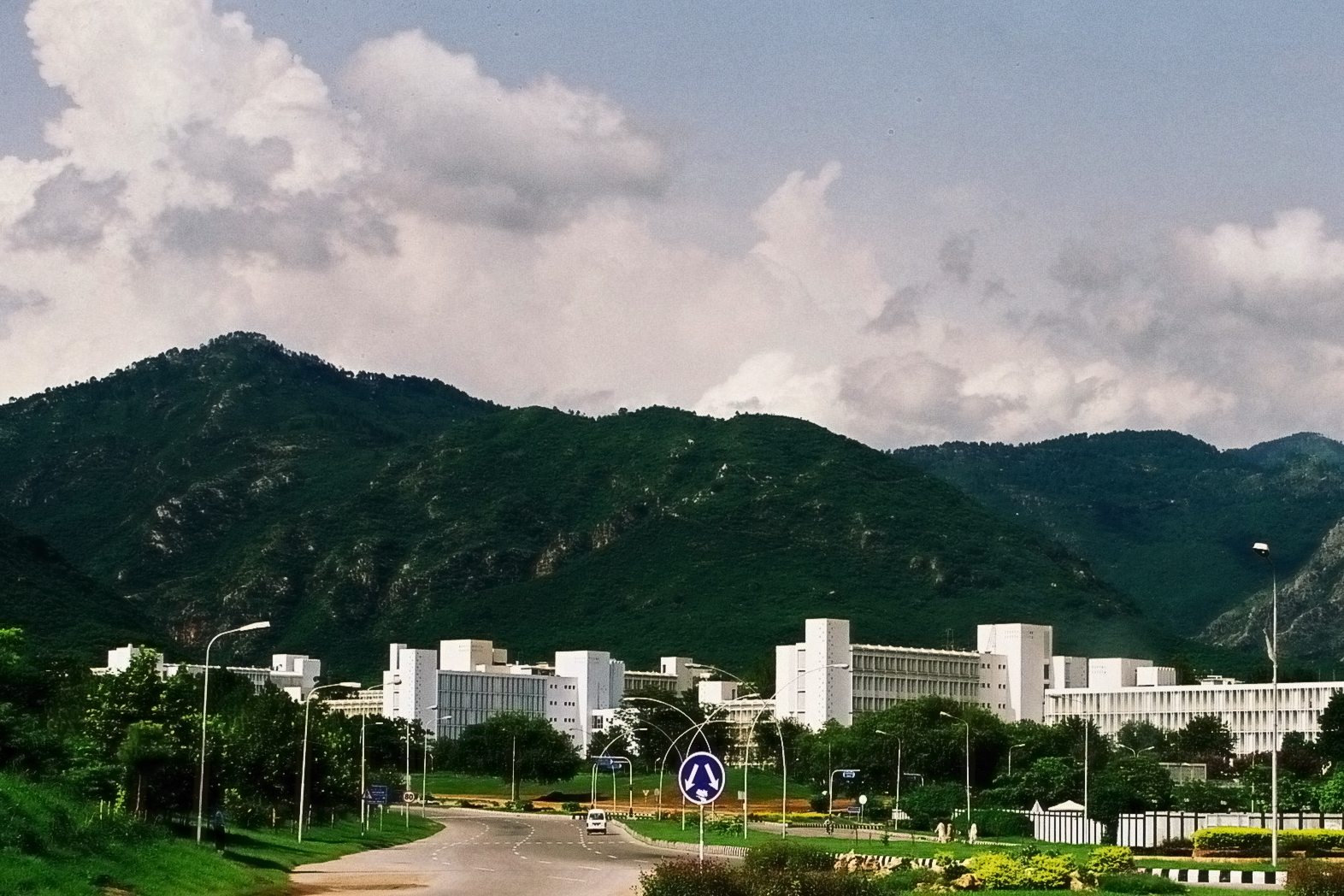
Pakistan Secretariat

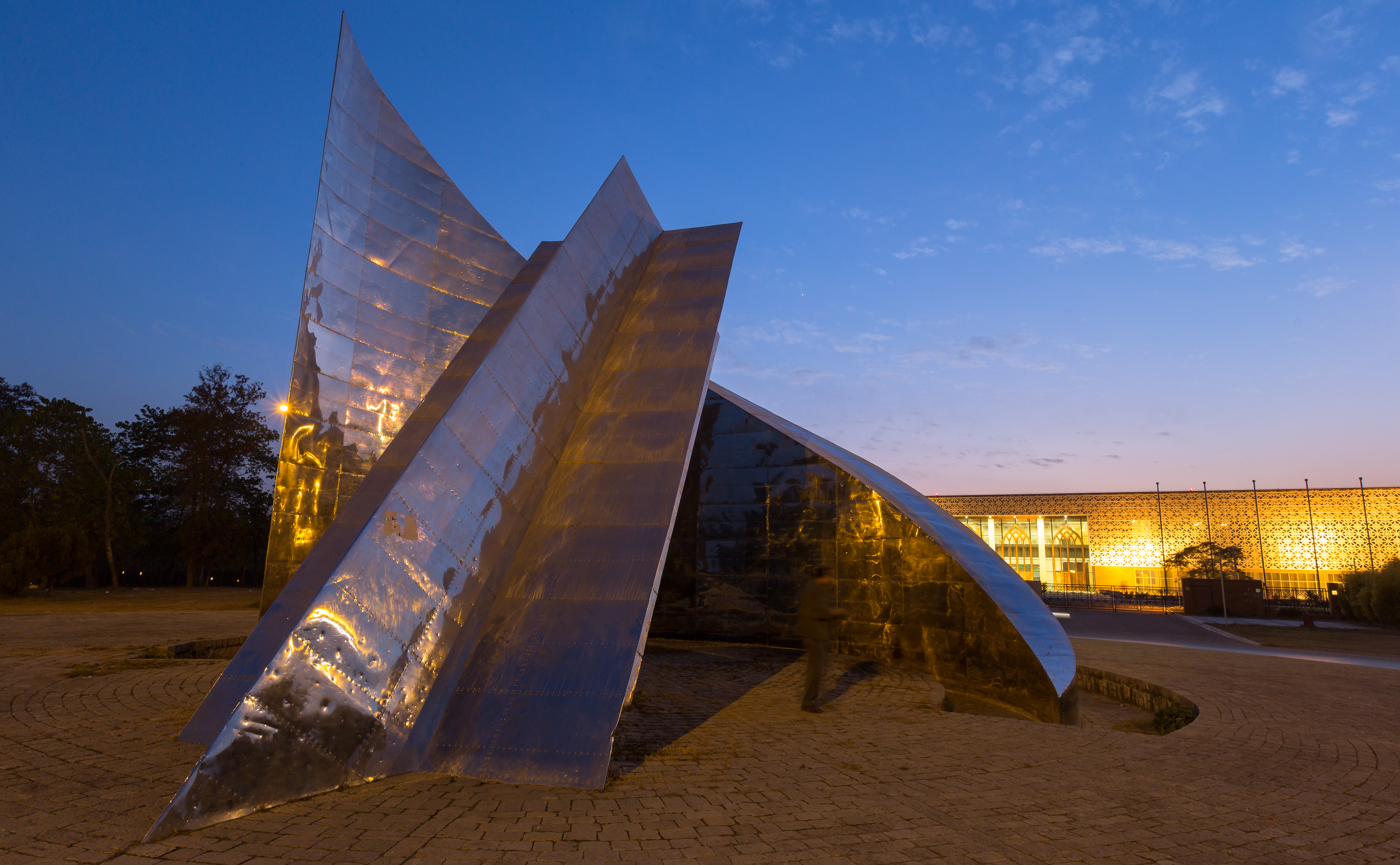
Star and Crescent Monument near the start of Shakarparian

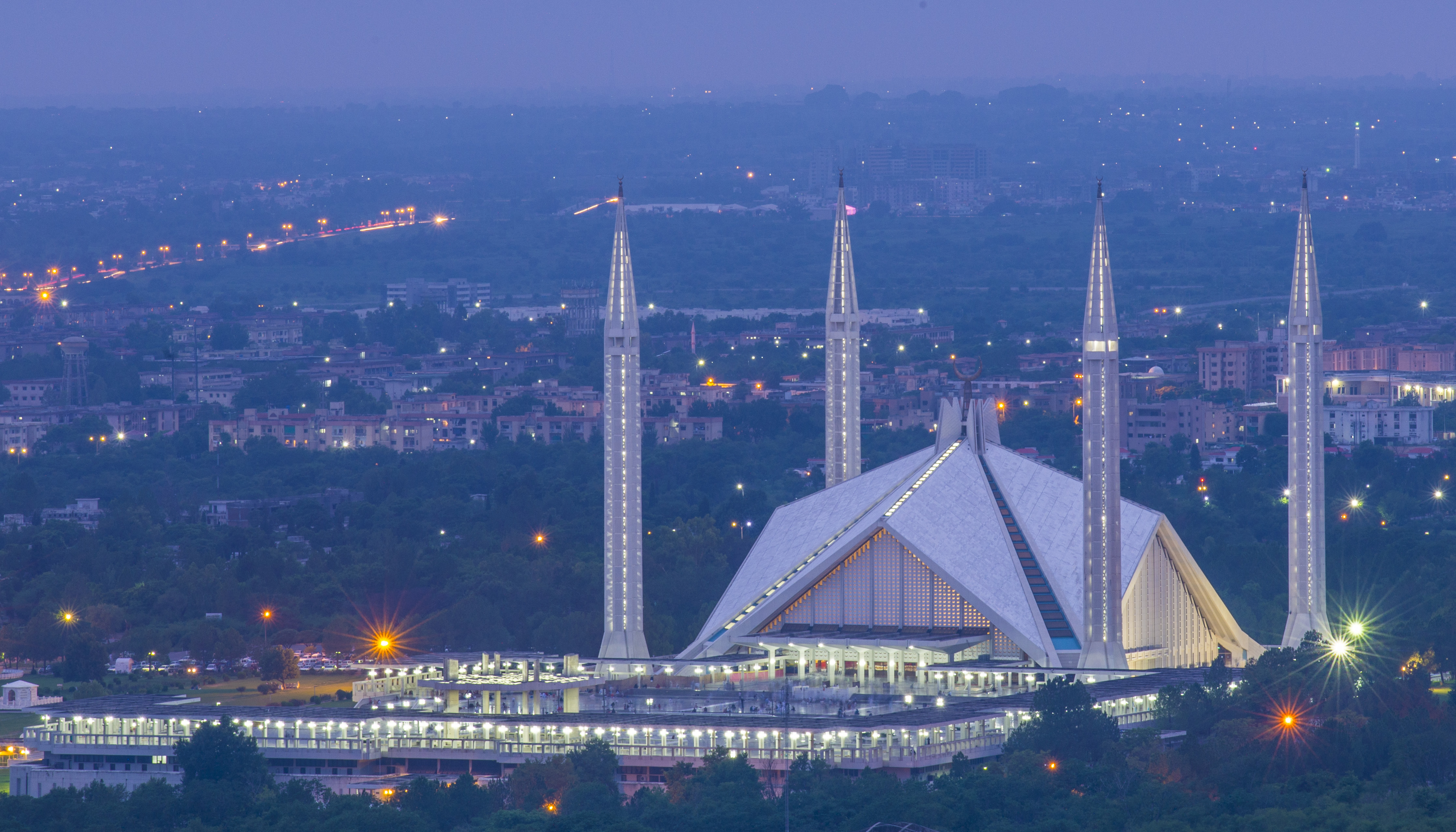
Faisal Mosque

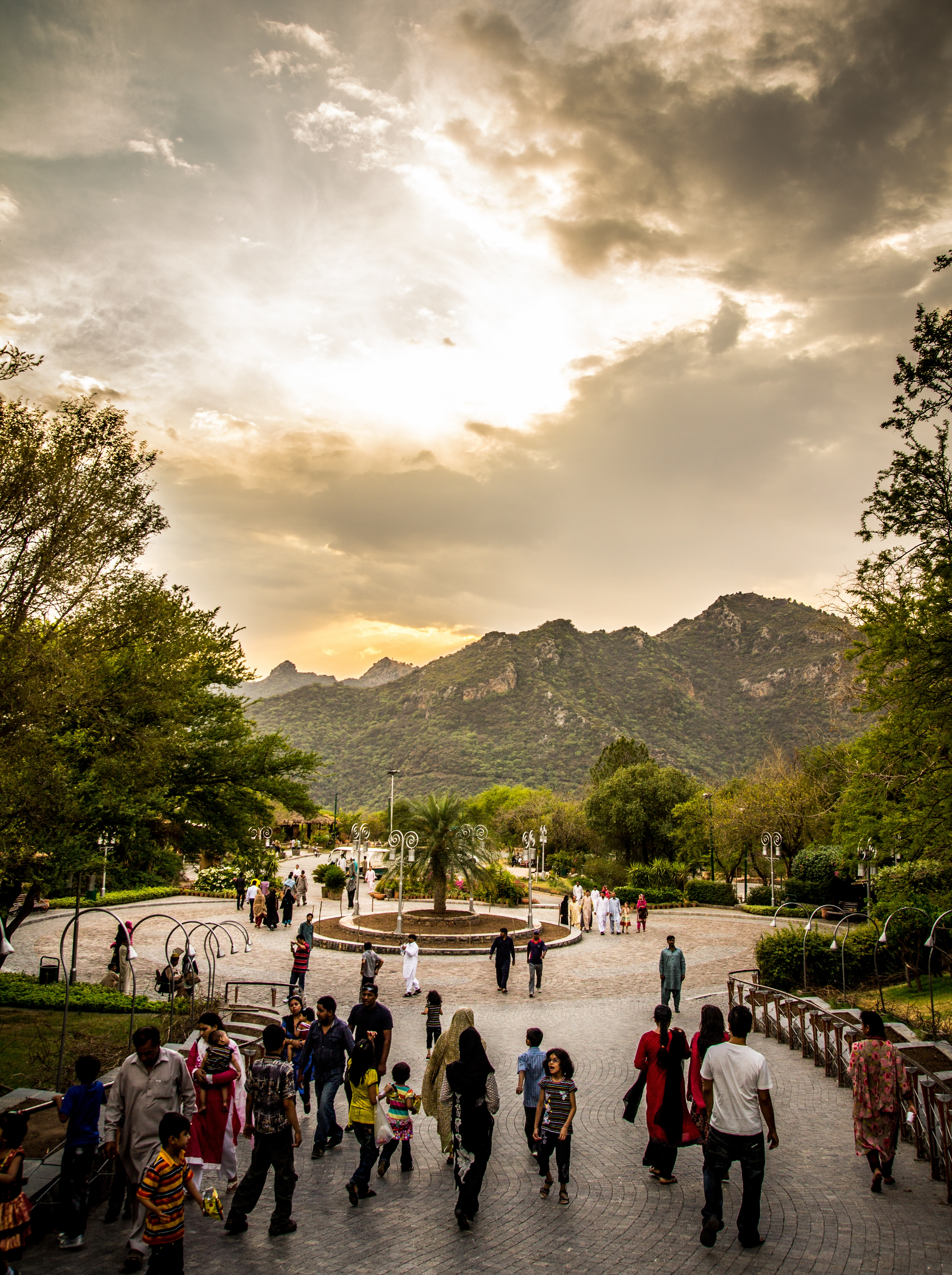
Daman-e-Koh Park

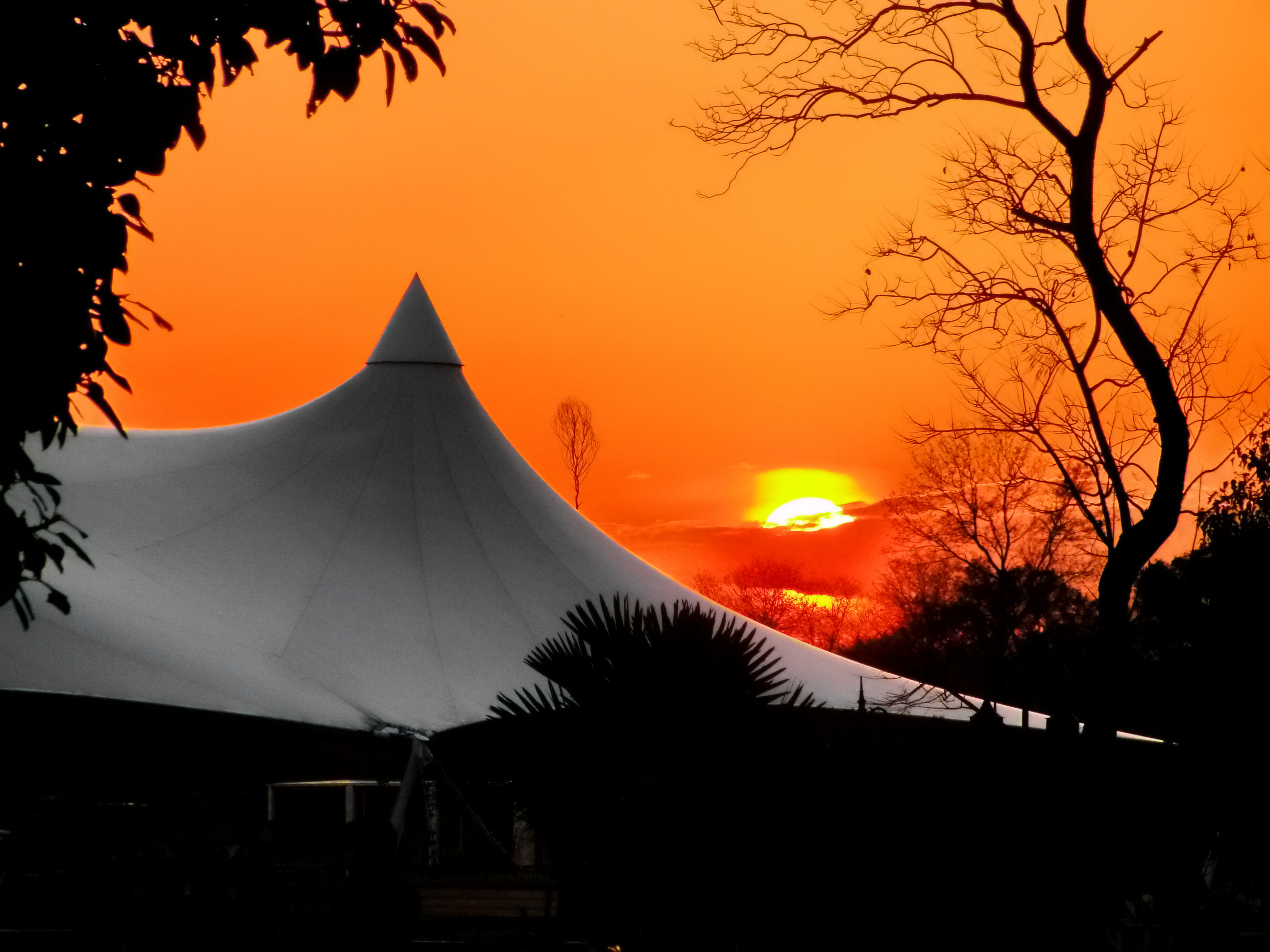
Sunset over the Lake View Park

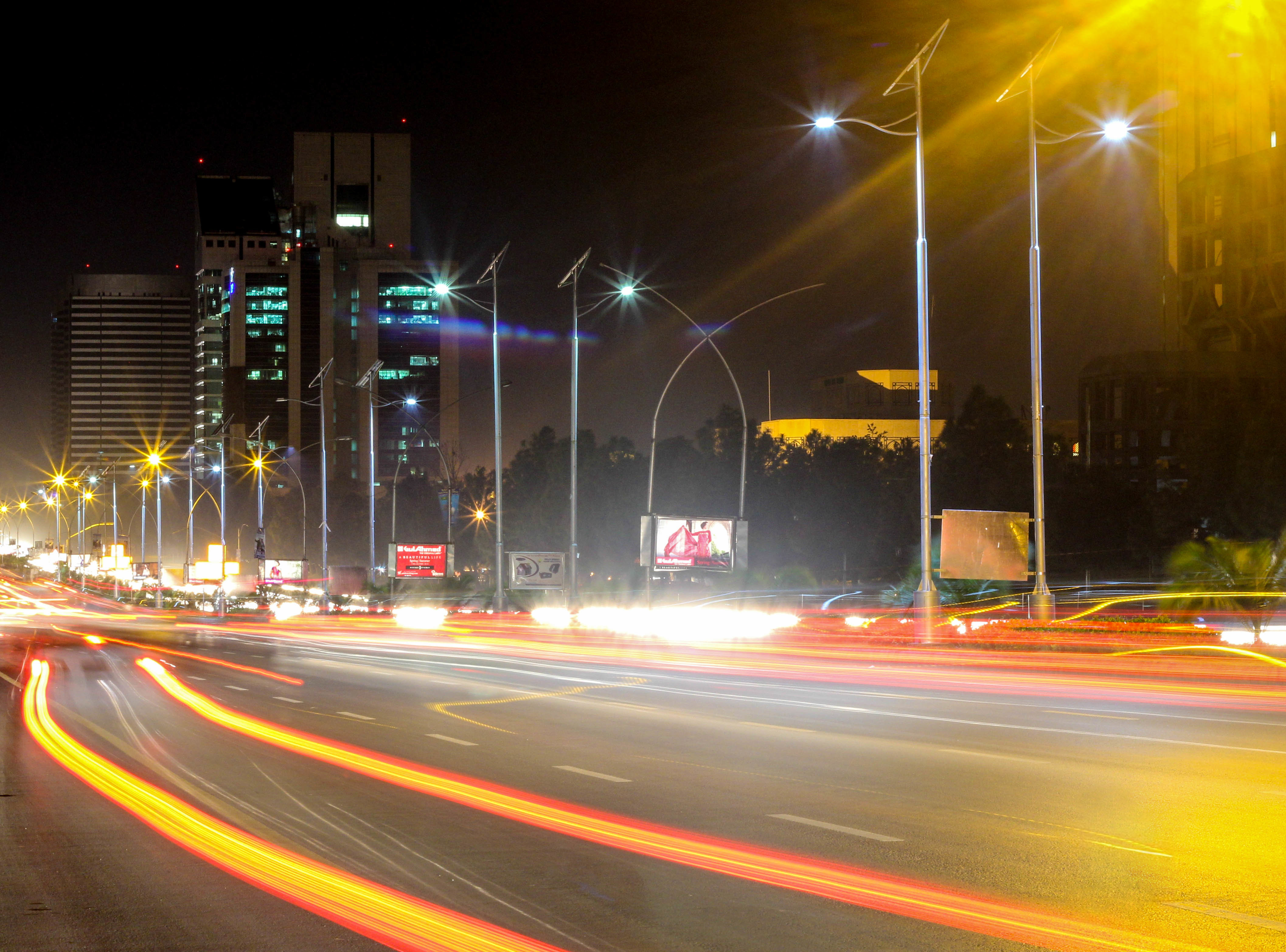
View of Blue Area, the commercial hub of the city.

== Economy ==
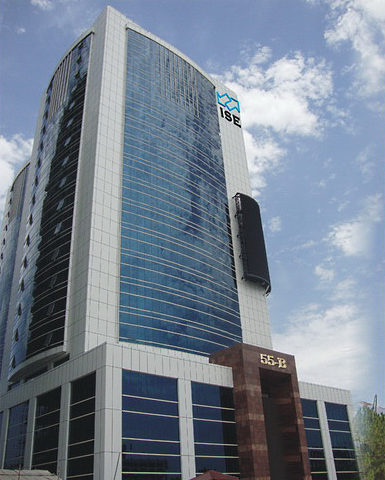
Islamabad Stock Exchange

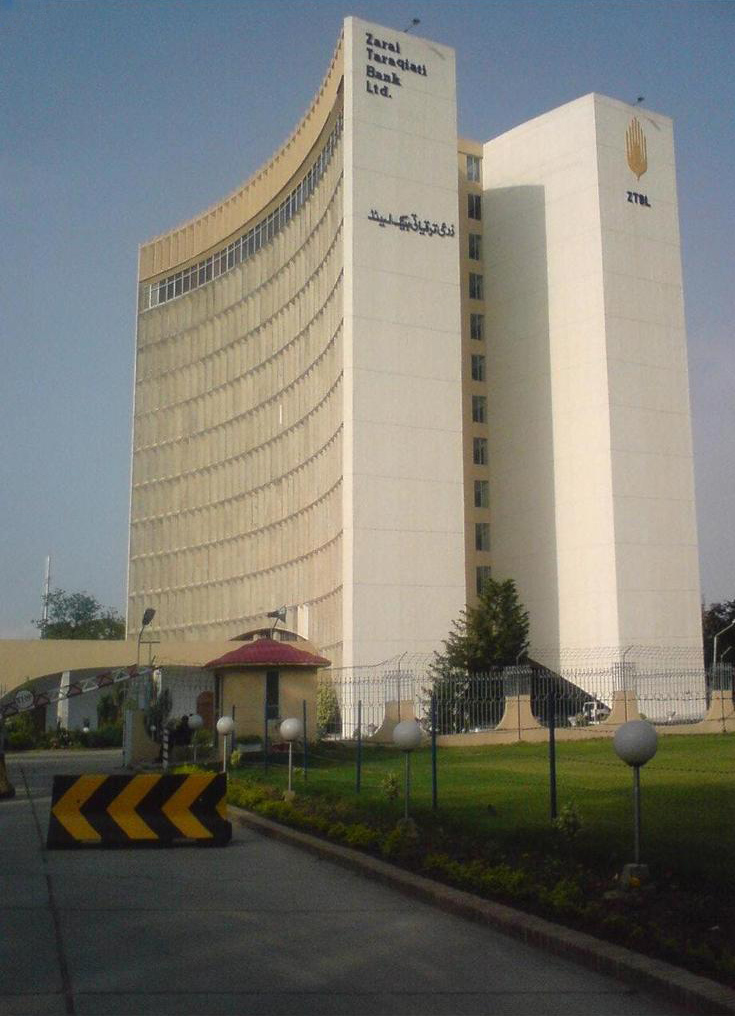
Zarai Taraqiati Bank Limited

Islamabad is a net contributor to the Pakistani economy, as whilst having only 0.8% of the country's population, it contributes 1% to the country's GDP. Islamabad Stock Exchange, founded in 1989, is Pakistan's third largest stock exchange after Karachi Stock Exchange and Lahore Stock Exchange. The exchange has 118 members with 104 corporate bodies and 18 individual members. The average daily turnover of the stock exchange is over one million shares. As of 2012, Islamabad LTU (Large Tax Unit) was responsible for Rs 371 billion in tax revenue, which amounts to 20% of all the revenue collected by Federal Board of Revenue.

Islamabad has seen an expansion in information and communications technology with the addition two Software Technology Parks, which house numerous national and foreign technological and information technology companies. The tech parks are located in Evacuee Trust Complex and Awami Markaz. Awami Markaz houses 36 IT companies while Evacuee Trust house 29 companies. Call centres for foreign companies have been targeted as another significant area of growth, with the government making efforts to reduce taxes by as much as 10% to encourage foreign investments in the information technology sector. Most of Pakistan's state-owned companies like Pakistan International Airlines, Pakistan Television Corporation, Pakistan Telecommunication Company, Oil & Gas Development Company and Zarai Taraqiati Bank are based in Islamabad. Headquarters of all major telecommunication operators such as PTCL, Mobilink, Telenor, Ufone, and China Mobile are located in Islamabad. Being an expensive city, the prices of most of fruits, vegetable and poultry items increased in Islamabad during the year 2015-2020

== Transport ==
=== Airport ===
Islamabad is connected to major destinations around the world through the Islamabad International Airport. The airport is the largest in Pakistan, handling 9 million passengers per annum. The airport was built at a cost of $400 million and opened on 3 May 2018, replacing the former Benazir Bhutto International Airport. It is the first greenfield airport in Pakistan with an area of 15 square kilometres (3,600 acres).

=== Metrobus ===
The Rawalpindi-Islamabad Metrobus is a 24 km (14.9 mi) bus rapid transit system that serves the twin cities of Rawalpindi and Islamabad in Pakistan. It uses dedicated bus lanes for all of its route covering 24 bus stations.

=== Motorways ===
All major cities and towns are accessible through regular trains and bus services running mostly from the neighbouring city of Rawalpindi. Lahore, Yarik, Dera Ismail Khan and Peshawar are linked to Islamabad through a network of motorways, which has significantly reduced travelling times between these cities. M-2 Motorway is 367 km (228 mi) long and connect Islamabad and Lahore. M-1 Motorway connects Islamabad with Peshawar and is 155 km (96 mi) long. Islamabad is linked to Rawalpindi through the Faizabad Interchange, which has a daily traffic volume of about 48,000 vehicles. M-14 Motorway connects Islamabad to Dera Ismail Khan and Yarik. It is 285 km (177 mi) long.

== Education ==
Islamabad has the highest literacy rate of Pakistan at 95%. Islamabad also has some of Pakistan's major universities, including Quaid-i-Azam University, the International Islamic University, and the National University of Sciences and Technology and Pakistan Institute of Engineering and Applied Sciences

Quaid-e-Azam University has several faculties. The institute is located in a semi-hilly area, east of the Secretariat buildings and near the base of Margalla Hills. This Post-Graduate institute is spread over 6.90 square kilometres (1,705 acres). The nucleus of the campus has been designed as an axial spine with a library as its center. Other universities include the following:

- Bahria University
- Air University
- Quaid-e-Azam University
- Allama Iqbal Open University (AIOU)
- Alkauthar Islamic University
- COMSATS Institute of Information Technology (CIIT)
- Capital University of Science & Technology (CUST)
- Federal Urdu University of Arts, Science & Technology (FUUAST)
- National University of Sciences and Technology (NUST)
- National Defense University, Islamabad (NDU)
- National University of Modern Languages (NUML)
- Institute of Space Technology
- International Islamic University
- Institute of Cost and Management Accountants of Pakistan (ICMAP)
- Institute of Chartered Accountants of Pakistan (ICAP)
- Pakistan Institute of Development Economics (PIDE)
- Pakistan Institute of Engineering and Applied Sciences (PIEAS)
- Shifa College of Medicine
- Foundation University Islamabad (FUI)
- National University of Computer & Emerging Sciences (FAST-NUCES)
- Riphah International University
- University of Lahore
- Center for Advanced Studies in Engineering
- Preston University Islamabad Campus
- Iqra University Islamabad Campus
- Shaheed Zulfiqar Ali Bhutto Institute of Science and Technology (ZABIST)
- Hamdard University Islamabad Campus

== Sports ==
Islamabad United became the first ever team to win Pakistan Super League in 2016. And now the federal team Is participating in the Pakistan Cup. In 2025, Islamabad United has won 3 Pakistan Super Leagues and earned 3 titles They won PSL: 1, PSL: 3, PSL: 9 which solidifies their number 1 rank as the team with the most victories.

== See also ==
- Federal Capital Territory (Pakistan), a former federal territory
- Islamabad Capital Territory Administration
- List of cultural heritage sites in Islamabad Capital Territory
- Developments in Islamabad
- Model Town Humak
