= Gokina =

Gokina گوکینہ
- Village
- Location within Islamabad Capital Territory
- Coordinates: 33.768937036466035°N 73.06580848180079°E
- Time zone: UTC+5 (Pakistan Standard Time)

Gokina is a valley settlement situated on the leeward side of the Margalla Hills, 21 km from Islamabad, Pakistan. It borders the Hazara Division in the north.

The hamlet is known for its scenery, green meadows, and terrace farming, and attracts tourists due to its views. The area is filled with pine trees and a natural spring arising from the mountains. The spring, running parallel to the mountains, separates the area into two parts. Its water in some places is stored in local reservoirs for home use.

It sits in a valley near Monal Restaurant and Talhaar, in Haripur District.

== Climate ==
Gokina's climate differs from Islamabad's. The weather is cool to cold in winter and moderate in summer, with ample sunshine during the warm season.

== Source of income ==
Gokina’s residents mostly earn their living through farming and livestock, mainly cattle and water buffalo. Schools in the area are scarce, so many younger residents have migrated to other cities. Tourism is another major source of income; residents run small shops and sell trinkets to visitors. Nowadays most of the residents have government jobs as live stock and agriculture sector do not meet with the needs of the people. Due to scarcity of educational institutions, most of the students both boys and girls got admitted in Islamabad city.

== Transportation ==
The area's mountainous roads are steep, sloppy in bad weather, and narrow, making the valley sometimes difficult to reach. The allure of such surroundings, though, makes the town a tourist draw. Roads are mostly cut out of the mountains, and landslides blocking roads are common. The higher altitudes allow only higher-powered vehicles like pickup trucks to traverse the area. Inhabitants mostly use motor bikes to visit the main cities.

== Infrastructure ==
Most of the people live in cement houses, while some live in mud huts built near their farms. Electricity is provided by the government, but there is no supply of gas, and people burn wood to cook and for heat. Many mosques exist in the village. A medical center with limited services is situated on the outskirts of the village, but the area has no proper hospital, so people must go to the cities for emergencies. There is a high school for boys and girls.

On 23 February 2023, Asia-Pacific region's first smart village was inaugurated in Gokina. The project, part of the Smart Village Pakistan programme, aims to digitally transform the village by providing access to the Internet and other digital services such as EHealth. The project was jointly launched by the Ministry of Information Technology and Telecommunication, Huawei, International Telecommunication Union, and Universal Service Fund.
