= Jhangi Sayedan =

Union council in Pakistan

- Union Council - 45
- Location within Pakistan
- Coordinates: 33.37°N 72.57°E
- Country: Pakistan
- Province: Islamabad Capital Territory
- Time zone: UTC+5 (PST)

Jhangi Sayedan is a village and union council situated in the Islamabad Capital Territory of Pakistan. Its geographical coordinates are 33° 37' 32 North, 72° 57' 6 East. The village is named after the Sayyid tribe, who make up the majority of the population.
