= Sarai Kharbooza =

Caravanserai in Islamabad

Sarai Kharbuza
- سرائے خربوزہ
- Interactive map of the Sarai Kharbuza area

General information
- Type: Caravanserai
- Location: Sarai Kharbuza village, Islamabad Capital Territory, Pakistan
- Coordinates: 33.68110°N 72.90306°E
- Construction started: 16th century (before 1605)

Technical details
- Material: Brick and sandstone
- Floor count: 1

Sarai Kharbuza is a caravanserai situated in Islamabad, Pakistan. The caravanserai is situated in a village of the same name, along the old Grand Trunk Road.

The caravanserai functioned as a resting place for a variety of travelers, including merchants, pilgrims, and officials.

== History ==
The Gakhars, who ruled the Pothohar region during the Mughal period, are credited with building Sarai Kharbuza. The exact construction date is unknown, but such inns were typically spaced about every 20 kilometers along the Grand Trunk Road, established by emperor Sher Shah Suri.

Mughal emperor Jahangir documented his stay there in 1605 in his autobiography, Tuzk-e-Jahangiri.

The structure, originally a square with each side measuring 400 feet, was built from bricks and sandstone. It included separate living quarters and courtyards for men and women, a mosque, a market, and a hamam (bathhouse). The primary courtyard featured a spring well for water supply.

The most significant remains of the hamam are a water heater and a round water tank constructed from small bricks, with an interior copper lining. The mosque within the complex has expanded over time, reflecting the area's population growth. The sarai's architecture, consisting of cells (khanahas), stalls, and storage spaces, catered to the diverse needs of its travelers.

== Architecture ==
The layout of the sarai includes separate living quarters and courtyards for men and women, a mosque, a market, and a hamam (bathhouse), with a spring well in the main courtyard for water. The hamam's remains include a water heater with a copper-lined tank. The mosque, initially a small part of the complex, has expanded due to the area's growing population.

Architecturally, Sarai Kharbuza is square, each side measuring about 400 feet, and constructed with bricks and sandstone. It comprises a series of cells (khanahas), stalls, and storage spaces to accommodate travelers.
