= Mal Pur =

- Union Council
- Country: Pakistan
- Province: (Islamabad Capital Territory) Islamabad C.T
- Time zone: UTC+5 (PST)

Mal Pur is a union council in the Islamabad Capital Territory of Pakistan.

== History ==
Malpur is an old village near Rawal Lake and Murree Road, in the area that later became part of Islamabad. Archaeological research indicates that the area was inhabited centuries before the development of modern Islamabad. The Department of Archaeology and Museums records an archaeological settlement mound on the northern side of Malpur, near Rawal Lake, dating approximately to the 1st–5th century CE. Archaeological finds from the site reportedly include pottery fragments, a stone pestle, human bones, and a copper coin.

== Jinnah's connection with Malpur ==
According to a report published by Business Recorder, local representative Syed Bukhari stated that Quaid-e-Azam Muhammad Ali Jinnah and his sister Fatima Jinnah stopped at Malpur while returning to Rawalpindi from Srinagar and addressed a gathering there.

The account is reported by Business Recorder and is attributed to a local representative. Further primary-source documentation would be needed to establish the precise date and details of the visit.
