= Fawzia Arshad =

Pakistani politician

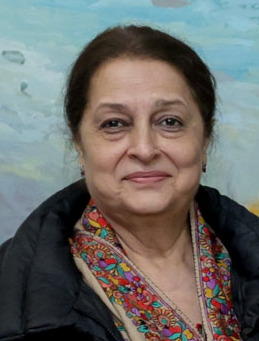

Member of the Senate of Pakistan
- Incumbent
- Assumed office March 2021
- Constituency: Islamabad, Pakistan

Personal details
- Party: PTI (2015-present)

Fawzia Arshad (Urdu: فوزیہ ارشد) is a Pakistani politician who is currently serving as a member of the Senate of Pakistan from Islamabad since March 2021. She belongs to Pakistan Tehreek-e-Insaf.
