= Mughal, Islamabad Capital Territory =

Mughal
- Union Council
- Country: Pakistan
- Province: (Islamabad Capital Territory) Islamabad C.T
- Time zone: UTC+5 (PST)

Mughal is a union council in the Islamabad Capital Territory of Pakistan.
