= Maira Sumbal Jaffar =

- Location within Pakistan
- Coordinates: 33.39°N 72.58°E
- Country: Pakistan
- Province: (Islamabad Capital Territory) Islamabad C.T
- Elevation: 547 m (1,795 ft)
- Time zone: UTC+5 (PST)

Maira Sumbal Jaffar is a town and union council in the Islamabad Capital Territory of Pakistan. It is located at 33° 39' 41N 72° 58' 29E with an altitude of 547 metres (1797 feet). The village of Maira Sumbal Jaffar has a population of around 500. Maira Sumbal Jaffar is UC # 39 of Isamabad and Its Villages are Maira Sumbal Jaffar, Badia Rusmat Khan, Maira Akku, Dhareek Mohri, Eteffaq Town. The first chairman UC # 39 village Maira Sumbal Jaffar is Sajid Mehmood Malik and first vice chairman is Naik Muhammad Iqbal Khokhar.
