= Kirpa, Islamabad Capital Territory =

Kirpa
- Union Council
- Country: Pakistan
- Province: (Islamabad Capital Territory) Islamabad C.T
- Time zone: UTC+5 (PST)

Kirpa is a union council in the Islamabad Capital Territory of Pakistan.

Located on a long thin hill range of the margalla Hills its hill is often called the Chirah or kirpa hill, it is also a viewing spot where all of islamabad's sectors and Rawalpindi are visible Kirpa has a road running through it which connects to the Lehtrar road Kirpa has 3 divisions or sub villages. Main kirpa Chanool Kirpa Bangial Kirpa All of these villages come under union council kipra
