= Malot, Islamabad =

Malot is a rural area in Islamabad. But with the advent of private Societies, the population has urbanized. It is located near Bhara Kahu between Kuri and Simly Dam roads. There are many societies in the current village whose name is Bahria enclave and Park view city. An old road passes through this village whose name is Kuri Road. Right along with this village Old City of برصغیر Its name is Kuri city.

== Population ==
The population of Malot is approximately 10,000 to 12,000. The majority of the population is Muslim and consists of Abbasi and Kiyanis families. In total population, 2% are Danyal, 17% are Syed, 29% are Kiyanis and 52% are Abbasis.

== Languages ==
Different languages are spoken here which include Potohari, Hindko, and Urdu.

== Employment ==
Some people are mid level employs in public or private organizations, but most locals earn money through agriculture, livestock and farming. People are also connected to real estate and property business.

=== Culture ===
Punjabi culture dominates this area. Eid festivals are celebrated. Crops cultivated here include wheat, maize and barley. In the southern part of Malot, Bahria started their 2nd real estate society named Bahria Enclave. On the northern side, there is a hill which is located for Botanic Zoo from CDA. Now the hill area is totally reserved for Park View society by Aleem Khan (IPP member).
