= Model Town Humak =

Model Town Islamabad - IMT
- Suburb town
- Islamabad Model Town, Malot Road
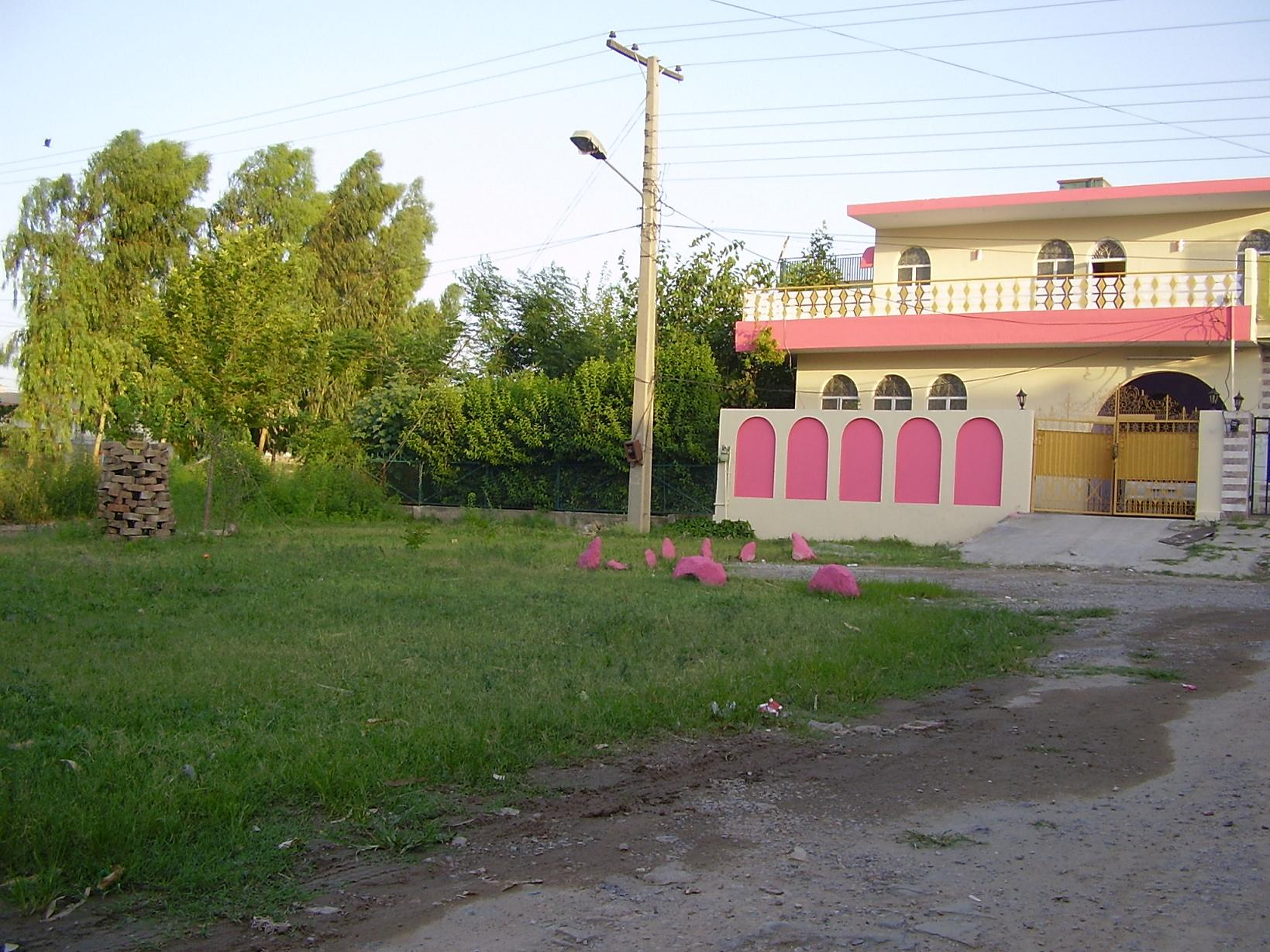
- A home in Model Town
- Interactive map of Model Town Islamabad - IMT
- Coordinates (Community centre*): 33.539851°N 73.152021°E
- Country: Pakistan
- Province: Islamabad Capital Territory
- District: Islamabad
- Started: 1984
- Subdivisions: Sectors: Humak Sharqi; Humak Gharbi; Humak Zimni

Government
  - Type: Union Council
- Time zone: UTC+5 (PST)

Model Town Humak is a suburb of Islamabad, Pakistan started in 1984. Located in Islamabad Capital Territory on Kahuta Road, Model Town is situated on Humak village land near the Soan River.

The area was formerly a jungle. According to the District Rawalpindi gazette of 1893, Humak was on the main railway line from Jhelum to Rawalpindi; those lines have since been relocated. The community now has more than 1500 homes laid out in an organised way, following the map provided by Capital Development Authority.

== Sectors ==
Model Town Humak has three sectors:

- Humak Sharqi (Eastern Humak)
- Humak Gharbi (Western Humak)
- Humak Zimni (Humak extension)

Schools and mosques are abundant throughout the town, with one in Humak Zimni being particularly prominent due to its large graveyard.

"Children Welfare School" is one of the government schools responsible for educating and training of children up to age seven.

=== Humak Sharqi ===
Humak Sharqi is located on the eastern entrance to the town and is the oldest sector. It is considered as the heart of Model Town Humak. The area is mostly residential, having main and the most important commercial areas like Ghee Mill Bazar, Rehmaniya Market, Raja Market and some main shops are Baba G Cook, Good Well Bakery, Madani Bakey, Ahsan cloth House, Hafiz Muhammad Waseem house, Chaudary Hardware store etc.

=== Humak Gharbi ===
The western region of Humak is mostly commercial. There are also two government schools. There is also main Quba market in Humak Gharbi sector. Some main shops in Quba Market are, Al Madina Cloth House, Waleed General Store, and Masha Allah General Store.

=== Humak Zimni ===
This sector was developed after the above-mentioned sectors as an extension of Humak. Its back coincides with the "Defence Housing Authority phase II" (DHA-II). In addition to the graveyard, there is a community centre with a municipal park in development. Zayneb Hospital is a private hospital of the area providing all health amenities including lab, operation theater and women-child healthcare facilities. There is a public park known as Humak park.

== Businesses in Model Town Humak ==
There are huge number of businesses in Model Town Humak

- Baba G Cook
- Madani Bakery
- Good Well Bakary
- Ahsan Cloth House
- Falcon Bakery
- Fazl E Rabi Pulao
- Mr Cook
- Khan Restaurant
- Usman Technologies
- Suffah Technologies
- Shah G Pan shop
- Touseef Electronics
- Fair Price Book Depo
- Al Faisal Uniform

== Humak industrial area ==
A separate area of Humak constitutes several industrial anchors.5%factory are increased. Some of the Humak industries are as follows:

- Swana International (Pvt) Ltd.
- AMSON Vaccines & PHARMA
- Ampak Enterprises
- Pepsi factory
- Malik ice factory
- Punjab Oil Mills
- Suzuki Motors
- Sheena textile (pvt) Ltd.
- Hico Icecram's warehouse.
- Creative Electronics & Automation
- East West Infiniti (pvt) Ltd.
- Patrotrade operations office
- Ageco (Pvt) Ltd. (Economia)
- Bio Labs (pvt) Ltd
- Global Pharmaceuticals (pvt) Ltd
- Imtiaz Store Warehouse

== Demographics ==
Most of Humak's residents are Muslims. However, non-Muslims also live in the region. A large number of residents are educated and are professionals in different fields.

== Nature ==
=== Birds ===
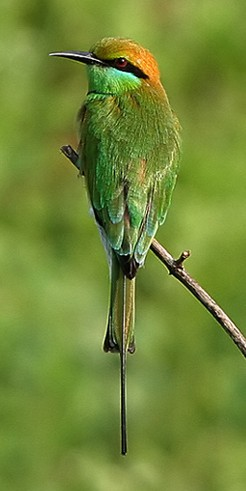

Pied kingfisher
House sparrow
Common myna
Common kingfisher
Common buzzard
Black drongo
House crow
Common babbler
Oriental magpie robin
Red-vented bulbul
Hoopoe
Rose-ringed parakeet
Spotted dove
Eurasian collared dove
Cattle egret
Little egret
Common swift
Little green bee-eater

=== Plants ===
Cannabis sativa (Bheng)
Ficus pumila

=== Insects ===
Dragonfly

== Politics ==
First Union Council election in Model Town was held in 2017, chaired by Qazi Faisal Naeem.

== Problems ==
One of the biggest problems was the damaged Kahuta/Sehala road. The road has been constructed but it only consists of a singly two lane road. Due to industrial area, the biggest emerging problem is constant parking of trucks and trailers on both side of road which makes it congested.

== See also ==
- Pakistan
- Islamabad Capital Territory
- Capital Development Authority
