= Koral, Pakistan =

Koral
- Union council
- Country: Pakistan
- Province: Islamabad Capital Territory

Government
  - Nazim: None
  - Naib Nazim: None

Koral is a village and Union Council (an administrative subdivision) located in Islamabad Capital Territory, Pakistan.

== History ==
The Union Council Koral was created following the establishment of Islamabad District in 1979. Prior to this the village Koral was part of Union Council Chaklala which was part of Rawalpindi District.

After the establishment of Koral Union Council it gained villages from Kirpa Union Council, and in 1986 some more villages were included in Union Council Koral.

== Development ==
Union Council Koral is the biggest union council of Pakistan and the most developed union council of District Islamabad.

== Geography ==
Union Council Koral is about 15 km from Islamabad city, on left side of Islamabad Highway. Union Council Sihala is on its eastern side, Kirpa and Tarlai Union Councils on its western side, Kahuta (Tehsil) to the north, and Rawalpindi District to the south.

== Area and population ==
Union Council Koral is spread over an area of 14,685 acres (59.43 km^{2}). Its total population according to the 1998 census is 24,008.

== List of chairmen ==
Raja Said was chairman from 1979 until his death in 1993. After his death, his vice chairman, Raja Ishiq Hussian, became acting chairman until the dissolution of local bodies in 1993. From 1993 to onwards, Koral has been administered by district administration officers.

== List of administrators ==
1. Raja Abdul Hameed (ADLG)Dhoke Raja Muhammad khan
2. JAWAD PAUL (AC Rural)
3. Joudat Ayaz (AC Rural)
4. Malik Muhammad Afsar (Magistrate Rural)
5. Amir Ali Ahmed (AC Rural, Now ADCG Islamabad)
6. Saeed Ramzan (AC City& Saddar)
7. Dr Ehtasham Anwer Mahar (AC UT, AC City &AC Rural)
8. Zaid Bin Maqsood (AC R)
9. Nadir Chatha (AC R)
10. MS Asia Gul (AC R)
11. Ms Naila Baqir (director excise)
