= Pind Begwal =

- Village
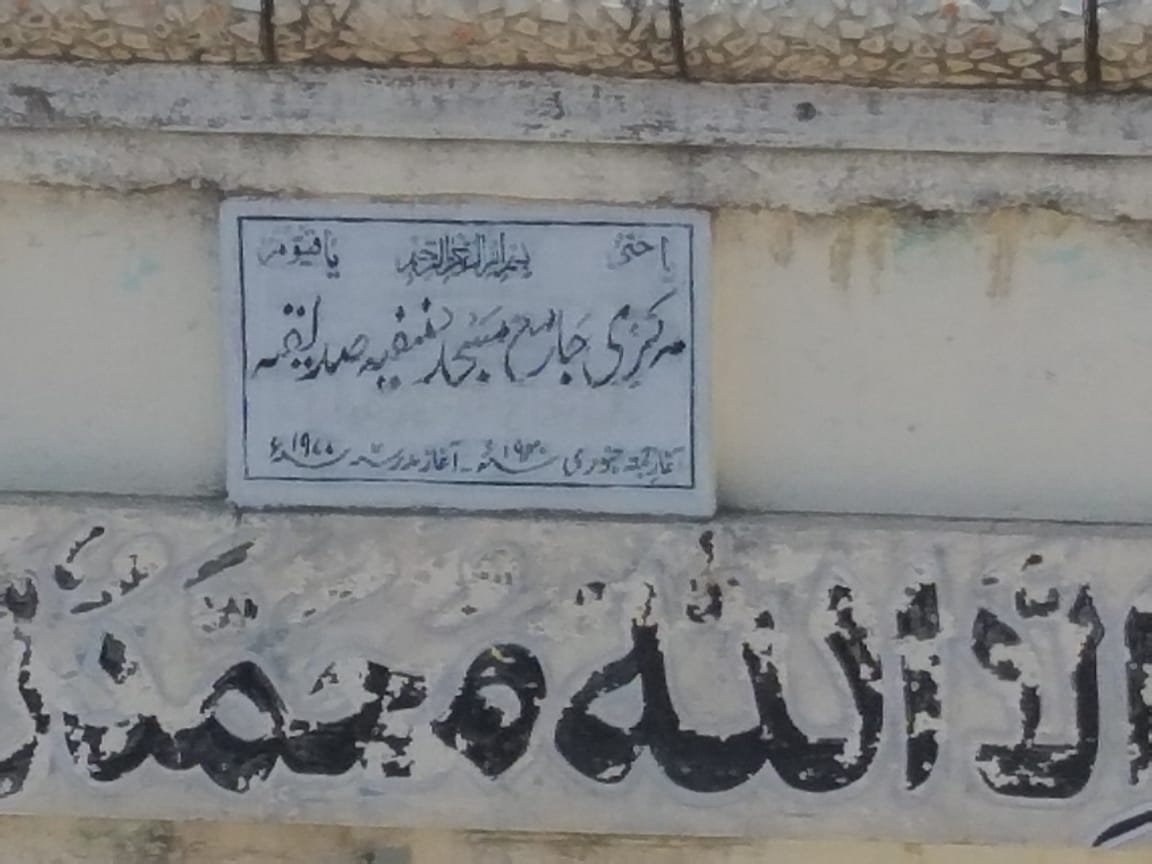
- Jami Mosque in 2019

- Location within Pakistan
- Coordinates: 33.42°N 73.14°E
- Country: Pakistan
- Province: Islamabad Capital Territory
- Time zone: UTC+5 (PST)

Pind Begwal is a village located on Simly Dam road in the Islamabad Capital Territory of Pakistan and administered by Pind Begwal Union Council.
