= Kuri, ICT =

Kuri
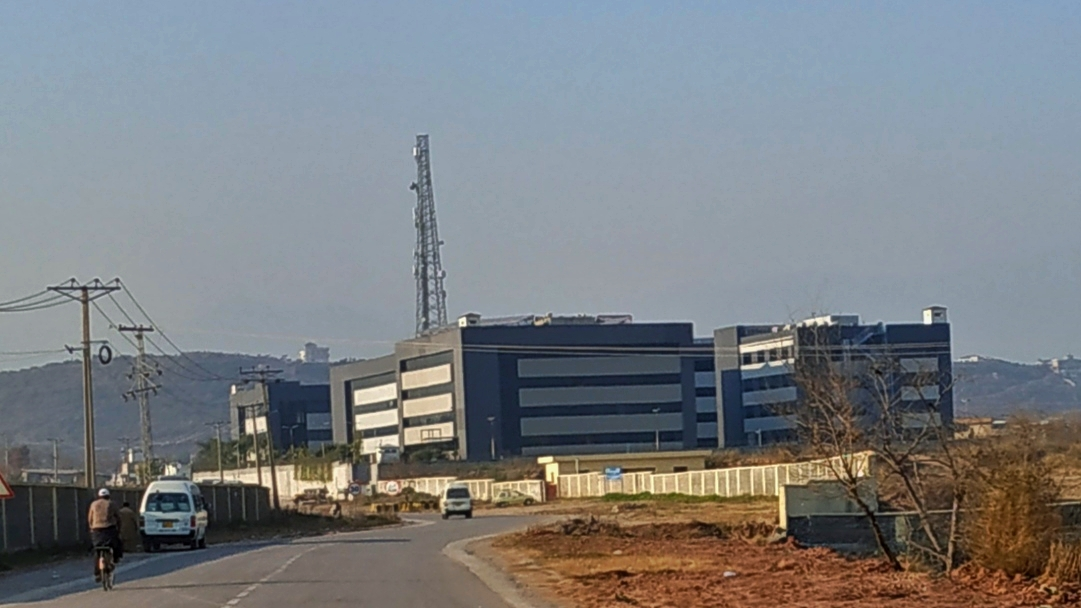
- Zong Headquarters in Kuri, Islamabad, Pakistan

- Location within Pakistan
- Coordinates: 33.40°N 73.10°E
- Country: Pakistan
- Province: Islamabad Capital Territory
- Elevation: 512 m (1,680 ft)
- Time zone: UTC+5 (PST)

Kuri, is a village located in the Islamabad Capital Territory of Pakistan. It is located at 33°40'0N 73°10'0E with an altitude of 512 m (1,680 ft).
