= Sohan =

Coordinates: 33°3′25″N 73°26′30″E

Sohan Literally 'soft' in Sanskrit
- Village and union council
- Interactive map of Sohan
- Country: Pakistan
- Province: Punjab
- District: Jhelum
- Tehsil: Jhelum
- Time zone: UTC+5 (PST)

Sohan is a village and union council of Jhelum District in the Punjab Province of Pakistan. It is part of Jhelum Tehsil, and is located at 33°3'25N 73°26'30E with an altitude of 303 metres (997 feet). Most of the population belong to the Panhwar Sohlan Rajputs.
