= Rawat, Islamabad =

Town near Islamabad, Pakistan

Rawat
- Union council
- Location within Pakistan
- Coordinates: 33.495955°N 73.196726°E
- Country: Pakistan
- Province: Islamabad

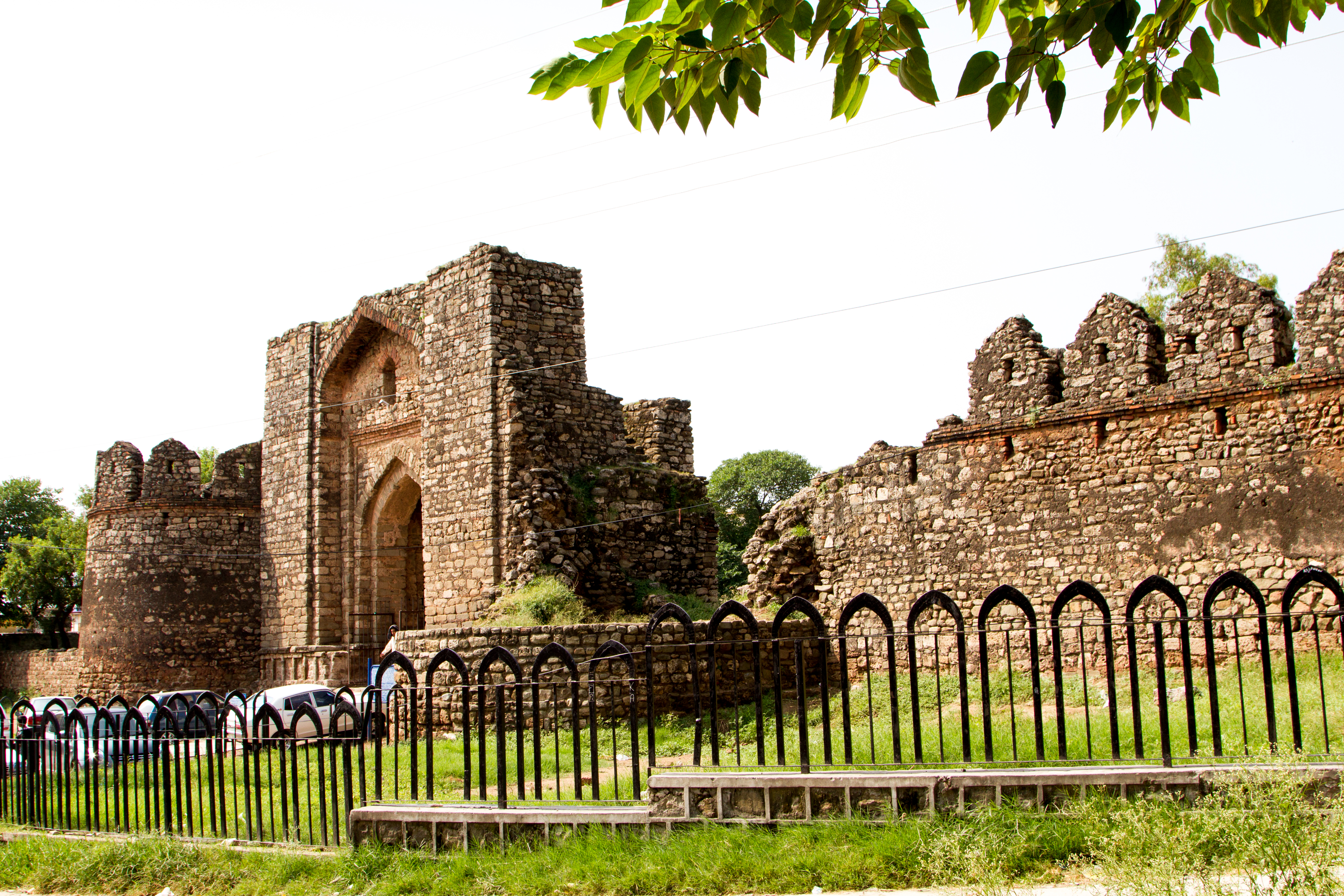
Rawat Fort

Rawat (Urdu: روات) is a town and union council of the Islamabad Capital Territory in Pakistan.

Rawat, Islamabad had 14,684 total voters in 2018.

== See also ==
- Islamabad Model Special Economic Zone
