= Simly Dam =

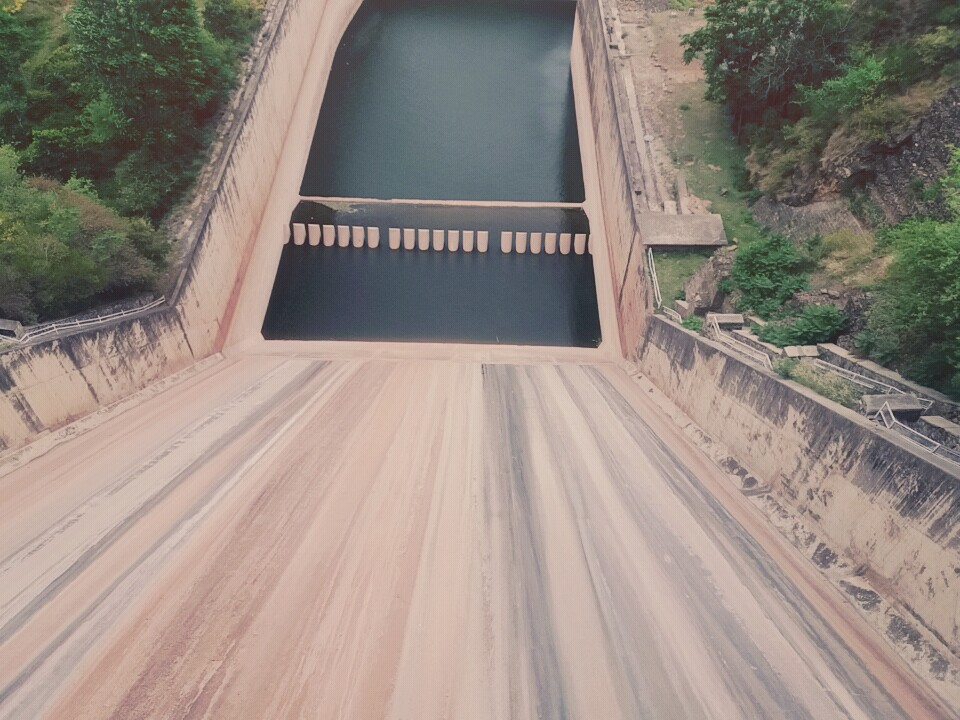
- Spillway of Simly dam

- Location within Pakistan
- Country: Pakistan
- Location: Islamabad
- Coordinates: 33°43′08″N 73°20′25″E
- Purpose: Water supply, irrigation
- Status: Operational
- Opening date: 1983

Dam and spillways
- Type of dam: Embankment
- Impounds: Soan River
- Height: 80 m (262 ft)
- Length: 313 m (1,027 ft)
- Dam volume: 1,977,000 m^{3} (2,585,818 cu yd)
- Spillway type: Ogee overflow
- Spillway capacity: 34,405 m^{3}/s (1,215,001 cu ft/s)

Reservoir
- Total capacity: 35,463,000 m^{3} (28,750 acre⋅ft)
- Active capacity: 24,669,000 m^{3} (19,999 acre⋅ft)
- Inactive capacity: 10,793,000 m^{3} (8,750 acre⋅ft)
- Catchment area: 153 km^{2} (59 mi^{2})
- Surface area: 1.7 km^{2} (1 mi^{2})
- Maximum length: 11.2 km (7 mi)

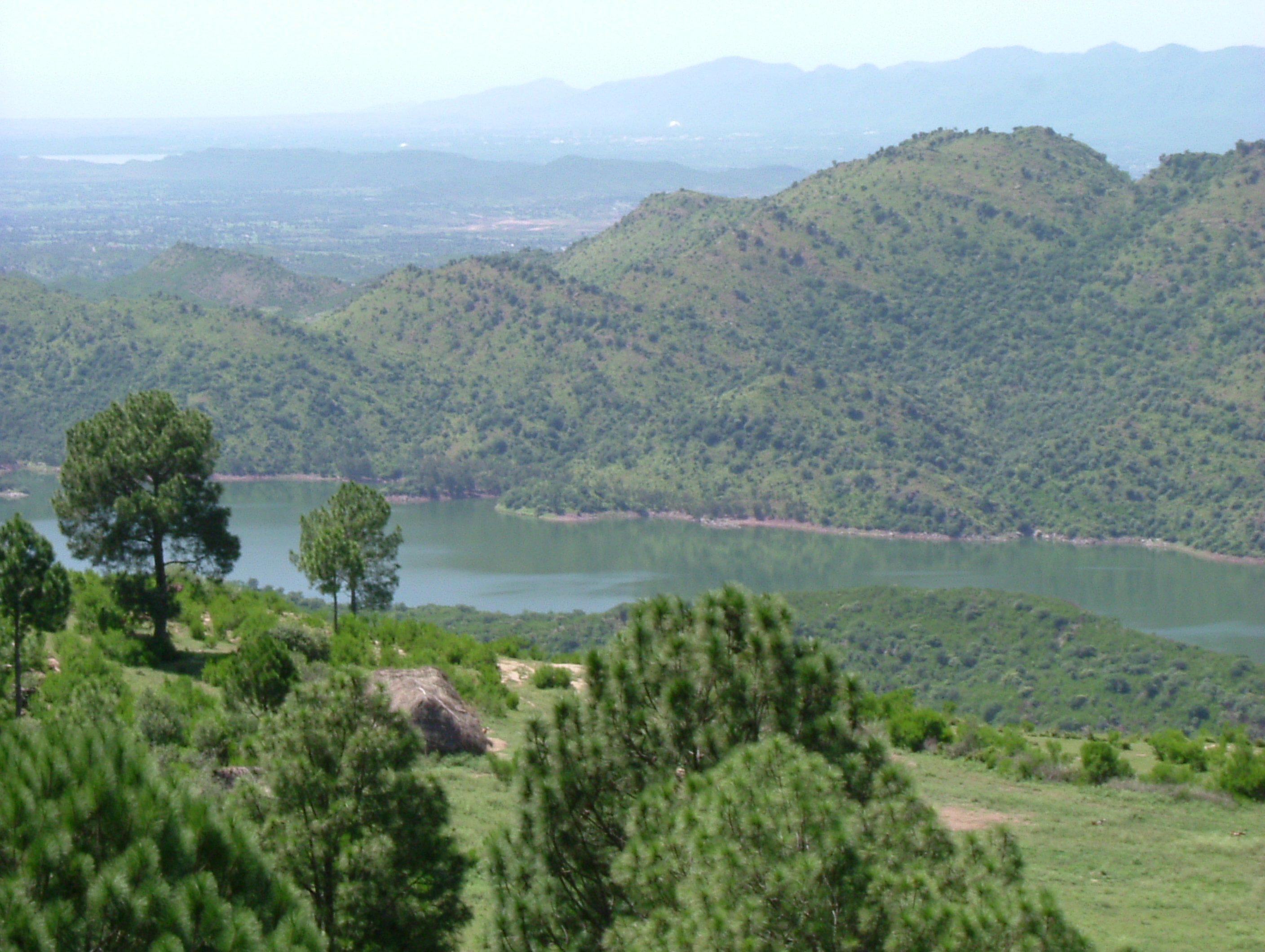
Lake of Simly dam

Simly Dam is an 80 meters (260 ft) high earthen embankment dam on the Soan River, 30 kilometers (19 mi) east of Islamabad and Rawalpindi in Rawalpindi District, Punjab, Pakistan. It is the largest reservoir of drinking water to people living in Islamabad, the capital of Pakistan. The water stored in this dam is fed by the melting snow & natural springs of Murree hills. It was developed by the Capital Development Authority. Planning for the dam began in 1962 and it was not completed when expected in 1972 due to project delays. It was completed in 1983.

== Recreation ==
Boating and Fishing are two main activities here. For fishing, you need to have license (permission) from Capital Development Authority.

== Native Wild Life ==
- Asiatic leopard
- Wild boar
- Golden Jackal
- Rhesus Macaque
- Leopard cat
- Gray Goral sheep
- Barking deer
- Chinkara gazelle
- Red fox
- Pangolin
- Porcupine
- Yellow throated marten
- Fruit bats
