= Gagri =

Gagri is a village in the Sihala union council of the Islamabad Capital Territory in Pakistan. The village is divided into eight dhoks: Gagri Mirzian, Gagri Jatal, Dhoke Shian, Pind Gagri, Dhoke Rajput, Hussain Abad (Dhoke Andya). The biggest of these dhoks is Dhoke Shiyan, which is located almost in the centre of the village.

Gagri is located near Japan Road, about half a kilometre from the Bhandar U-turn on the Islamabad Highway. Japan Road was constructed in the late 1980s by the Japanese Government as part of the Pak-Japan Friendship and stretches from Bhandar to Chakkian village.

== People ==
The main tribes living in the area are:

No	Village	Tribes
1	Gagri Mirzian	Mirza, Khakhar, Sohal Rajput
2	Gagri Jatal	Jutt, Jatal
3	Dhoke Shian	Gaffari, Mughal, Satti
4	Pind Gagri [Pind of Awan's]	Awan, Mathyal, Syed, Satti, Butt
6	Dhoke Rajput	Saohal Rajjput
7	Hussain Abad	Mughal

== Occupation ==
Many people in this area have served & serving in the Pakistan Army few of them served as commissioned officer in Forces, many other are serving in other defense departments such as the Khan Research Laboratories, PAEC, education department. Agricultural jobs are very common. Nowadays business of Real State is a common business. In Old days likely before 20–30 years due unemployment and insufficient source of incomes peoples were self employed in many different occupations like shoemaking, selling of home made items, Khadi, dairy, Barber, selling of Vegetable.

== Area ==
This village is accessed by Japan Road crossing a village named Bhandar. House Structure and looking of the village and its Dhoks is of ruler type. Now Jinah Garden has been developed in the area and land was purchased from peoples of area. Most area of the Jinah Garden was purchased from peoples of Hussain Abad, Dhoke Shian. Most of the area of the village being used for Agriculture since long but from few years the agricultural land adjacent to Japan road are commercialized. Small factories like Concert Blocks, Concrete Pipes are installed.

== Transportation ==
A railway line passes through the village and there is a heavy railway bridge constructed by the British government in 1860 that crosses the Soan River on the southern side of Dhoke Shian. On the southern side of Gagri there are many famous places such as CUST and the Kak Pul.

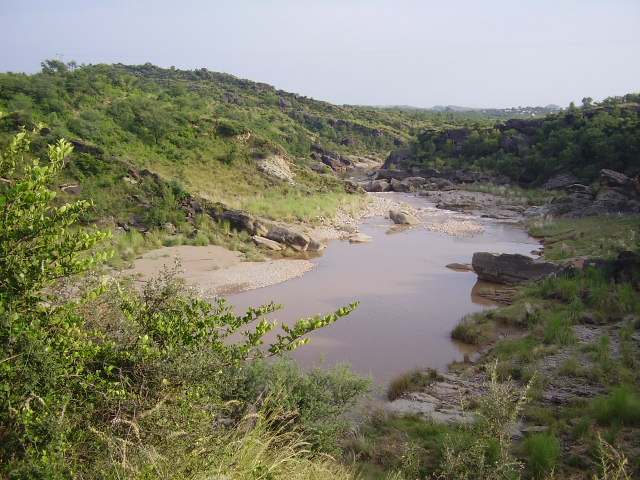
The Soan river cutting through Pothohar

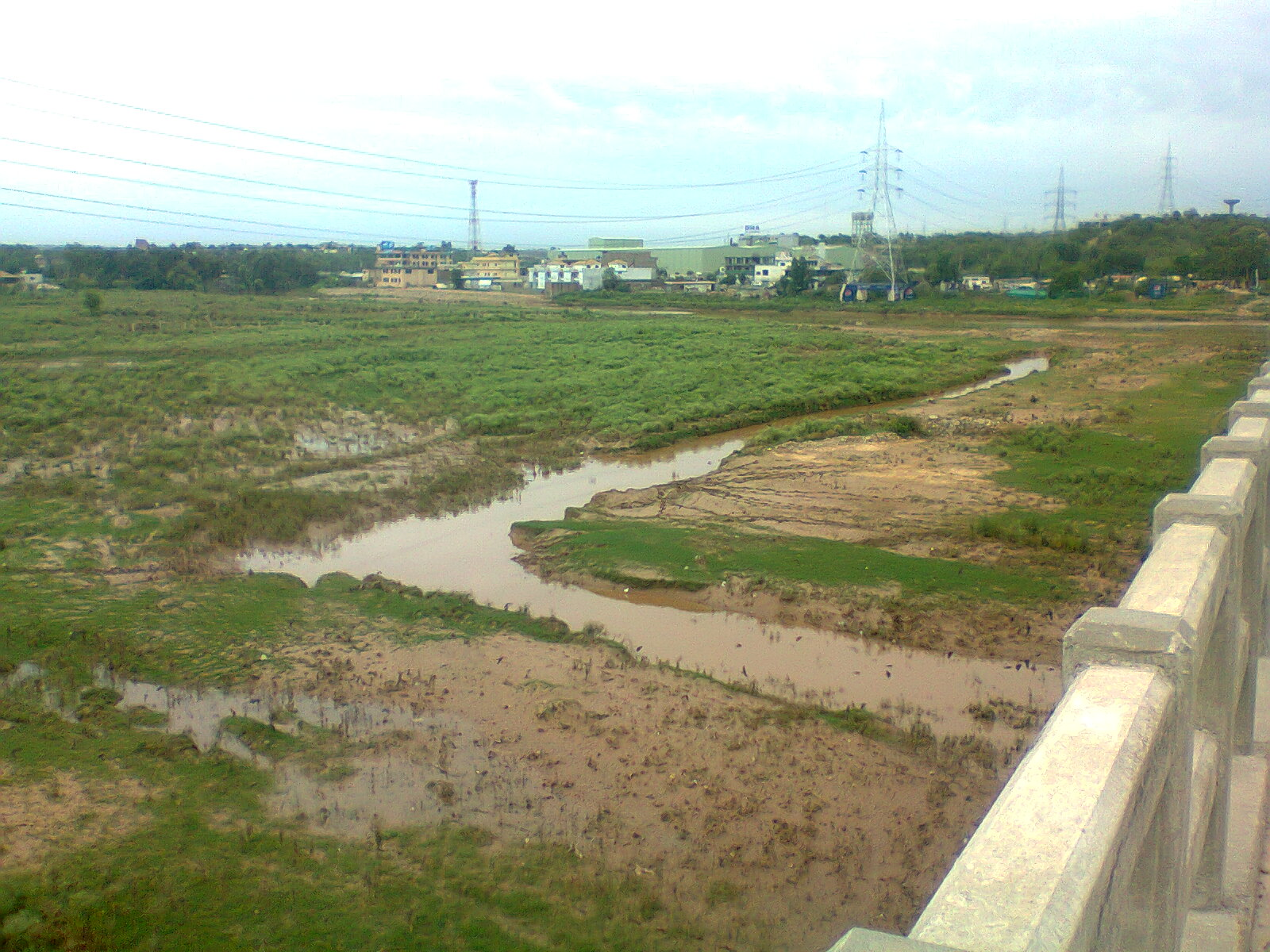
The Kak Pul

== Soan River flooding ==
In recent years, the Soan River has flooded often. The largest floods occurred in 1974, 1992, 1998 and 2010, when rains in the hills caused heavy flooding. 1992 was the worst flood in the Soan River's history, with floodwaters passing over the Kak Pul.

== Weather ==
The weather is similar to the rest of the Punjab region. In the summer months the temperature reaches 45 °C. However, during the winter months the temperature can drop below 5 °C, thanks to the heavy fog that gets created by the Soan River and Ling Stream. The period of rain is during late July and early August - rain is rare but can cause heavy flooding if it occurs.

== Gallery ==
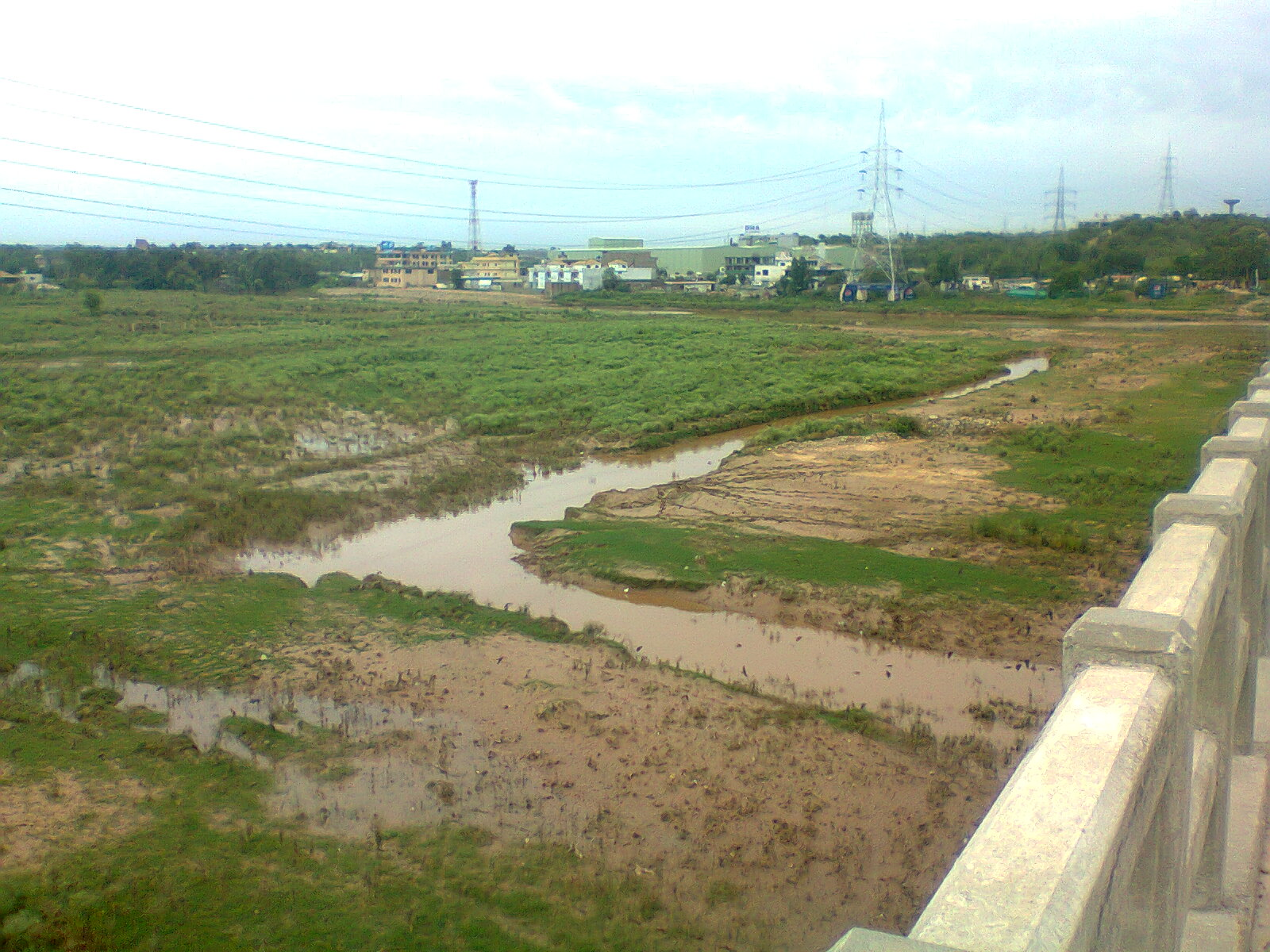
A view of the Soan river

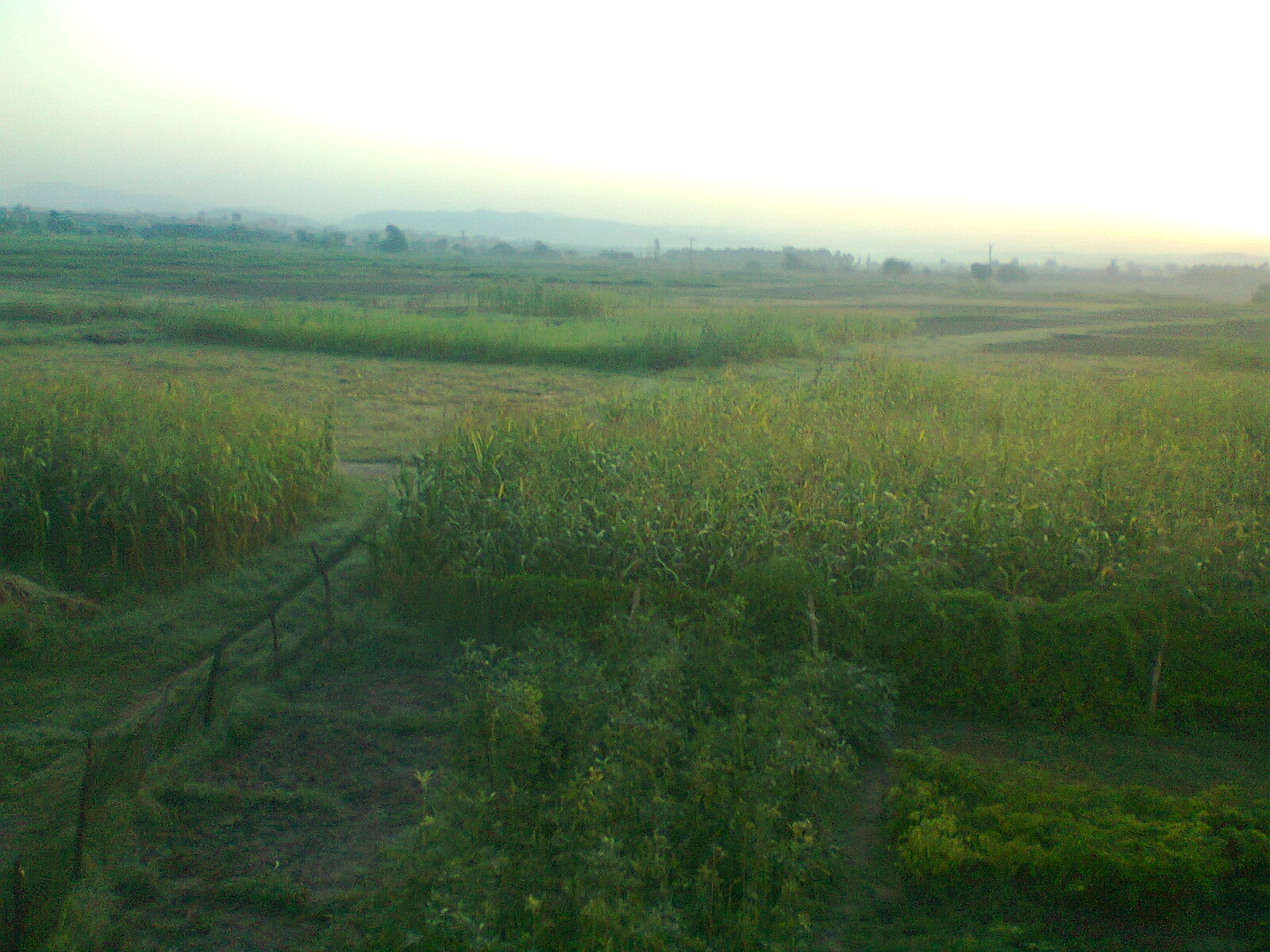
A typical morning view

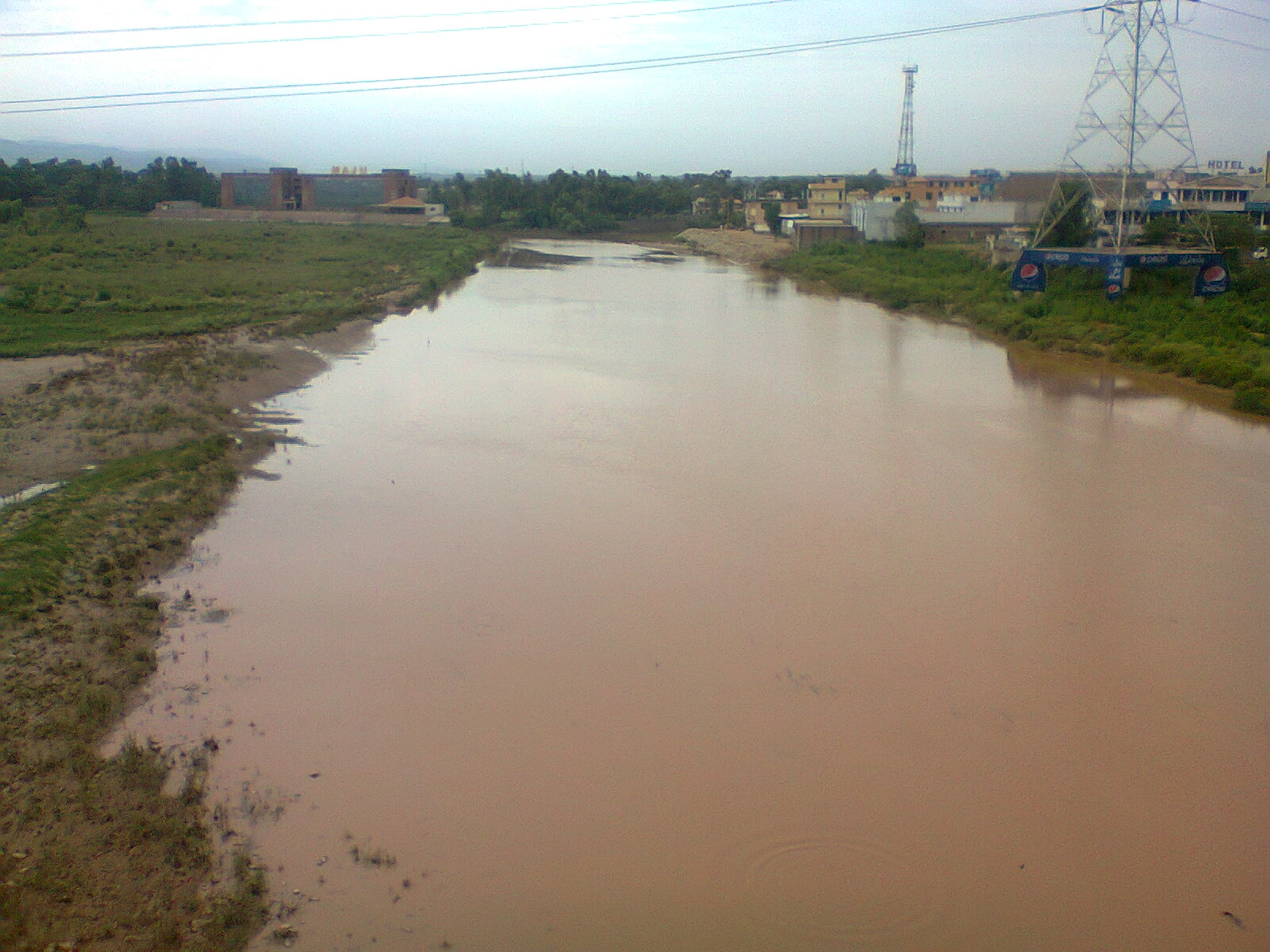
Soan River
