= Her-do-Gher =

Coordinates: 33.5685385°N 73.2409572°E

Her do Gher ہردوگہر
- Village
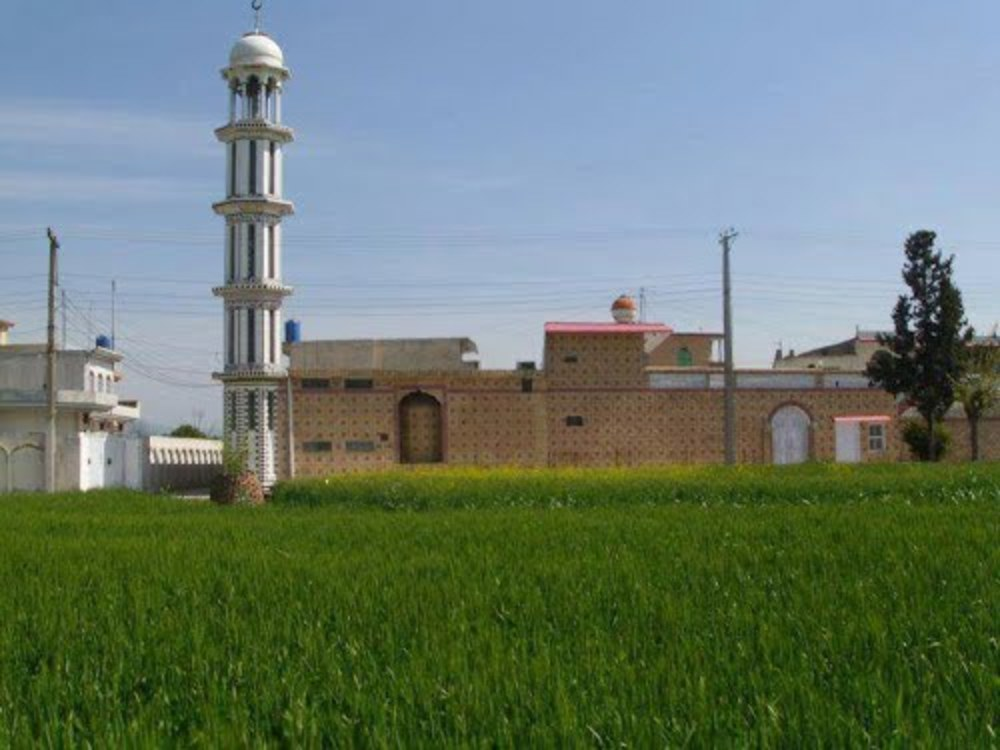
- Scenic View Masjid Dhoke Qazian, located in the Dhoke Qazian neighbourhood.
- Interactive map of Her do Gher
- Country: Pakistan
- District: Islamabad
- Time zone: UTC+5 (PST)

Her-do-Gher (Urdu/Pothwari: ہردوگہر) is a village to the east of Sihala, Pakistan. It lies beside Kahuta Road and is split into two parts by the Soan River.

It comprises 07 mohallahs (neighbourhoods): Nai Abadi, Dhoke Qazian, Gher Rajgan, Paran Gher, Chhal, Gharhi and Dandi. The main crops cultivated here are wheat and maize.
