= Geography of Islamabad =

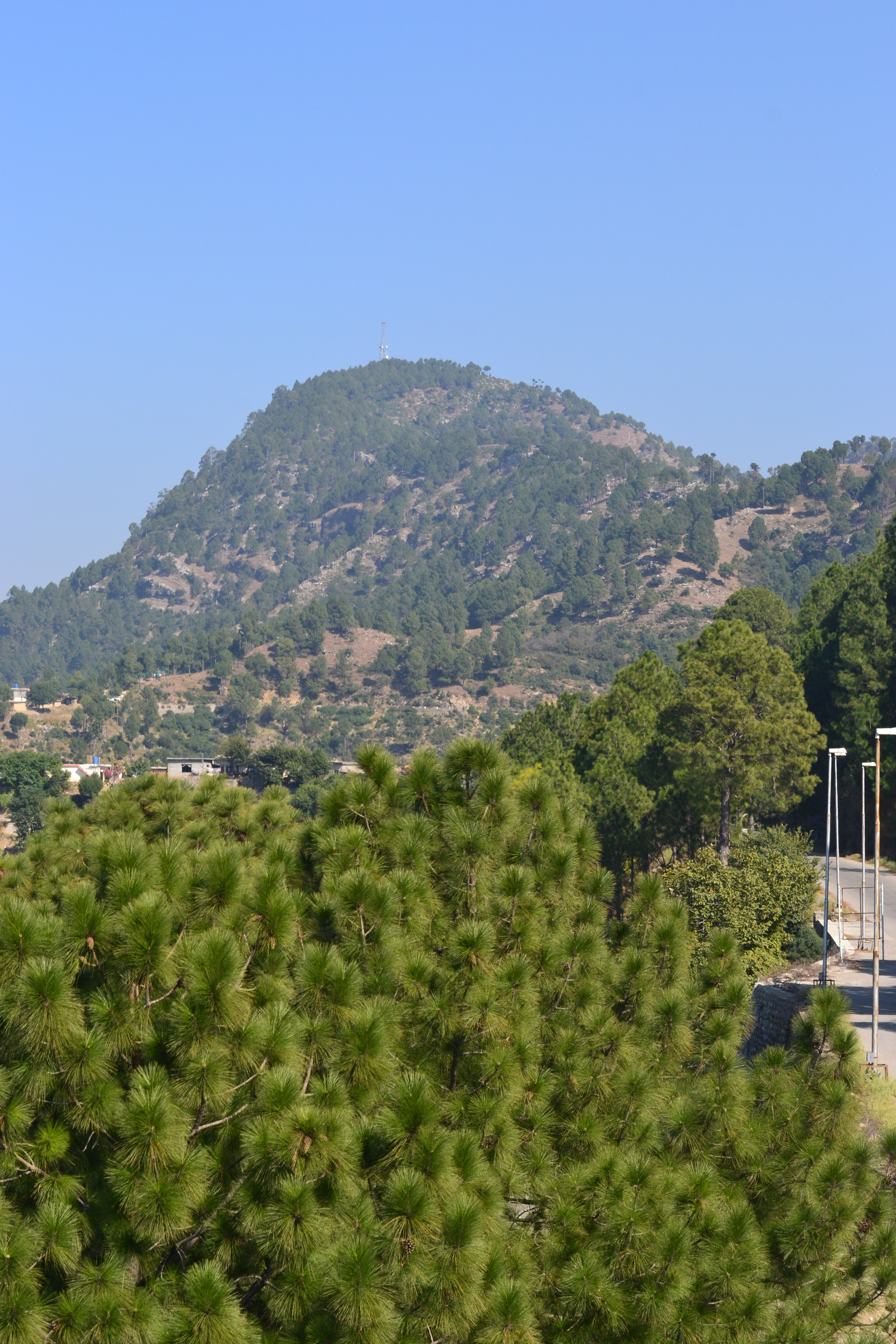
Tilla Charouni, the highest point of Margalla Hills

Rawal Lake in Islamabad

Islamabad is located at 33.6844°N 73.0479°E at the edge of the Pothohar Plateau at the foot of the Margalla Hills in Islamabad Capital Territory. Its elevation is 507 metres (1,663 ft), the highest being 1,584 m (5,196 ft). The modern capital and the ancient Gakhar city of Rawalpindi stand side by side and are commonly referred to as twin cities.

== Neighboring areas ==
To the east of the city lie Murree and Kotli Sattian. To the north lies the Haripur District of Khyber Pakhtunkhwa. Kahuta lies to the northeast, Taxila, Wah Cantt, and Attock District to the northwest, Gujar Khan, Kallar Syedan, Rawat, and Mandrah on the northeast, and Rawalpindi to the southwest.

Islamabad is located 120 kilometres (75 mi) SSW of Muzaffarabad, 185 kilometres (115 mi) east of Peshawar, 295 kilometres (183 mi) NNE of Lahore, and 300 kilometres (190 mi) WSW of Srinagar, the capital of Indian Kashmir.

== Geographical features ==
Tilla Charouni, with an elevation of 1,604 metres (5,262 ft), is the highest point in Islamabad district.

The area of Islamabad is 906 square kilometres (350 sq mi). A further 2,717 square kilometres (1,049 sq mi) area is known as the Specified Area, with the Margalla Hills in the north and northeast. The southern portion of the city is an undulating plain. It is drained by the Korang River, on which the Rawal Dam is located.

== Reservoirs ==
Islamabad's micro-climate is regulated by three artificial reservoirs: Rawal, Simly, and Khanpur dams. Khanpur Dam is located on the Haro River near the town of Khanpur, about 40 kilometres (25 mi) from Islamabad. Simli Dam is located 30 kilometres (19 mi) north of Islamabad.

== Forests ==
89 hectares (220 acres) of the city consists of Margalla Hills National Park. The Lohi Bher forest, now converted into a wildlife park, is situated along the Islamabad Highway, covering an area of 440 hectares (1,087 acres).
