= Sihala (disambiguation) =

The name Sihala is used in following articles.

- Sihala - A town in Islamabad, Pakistan
- Sihala (spider) - spider genus of family Pholcidae, restricted to India and Sri Lanka
