= Mandwaal =

Village in Punjab, Pakistan

- Village
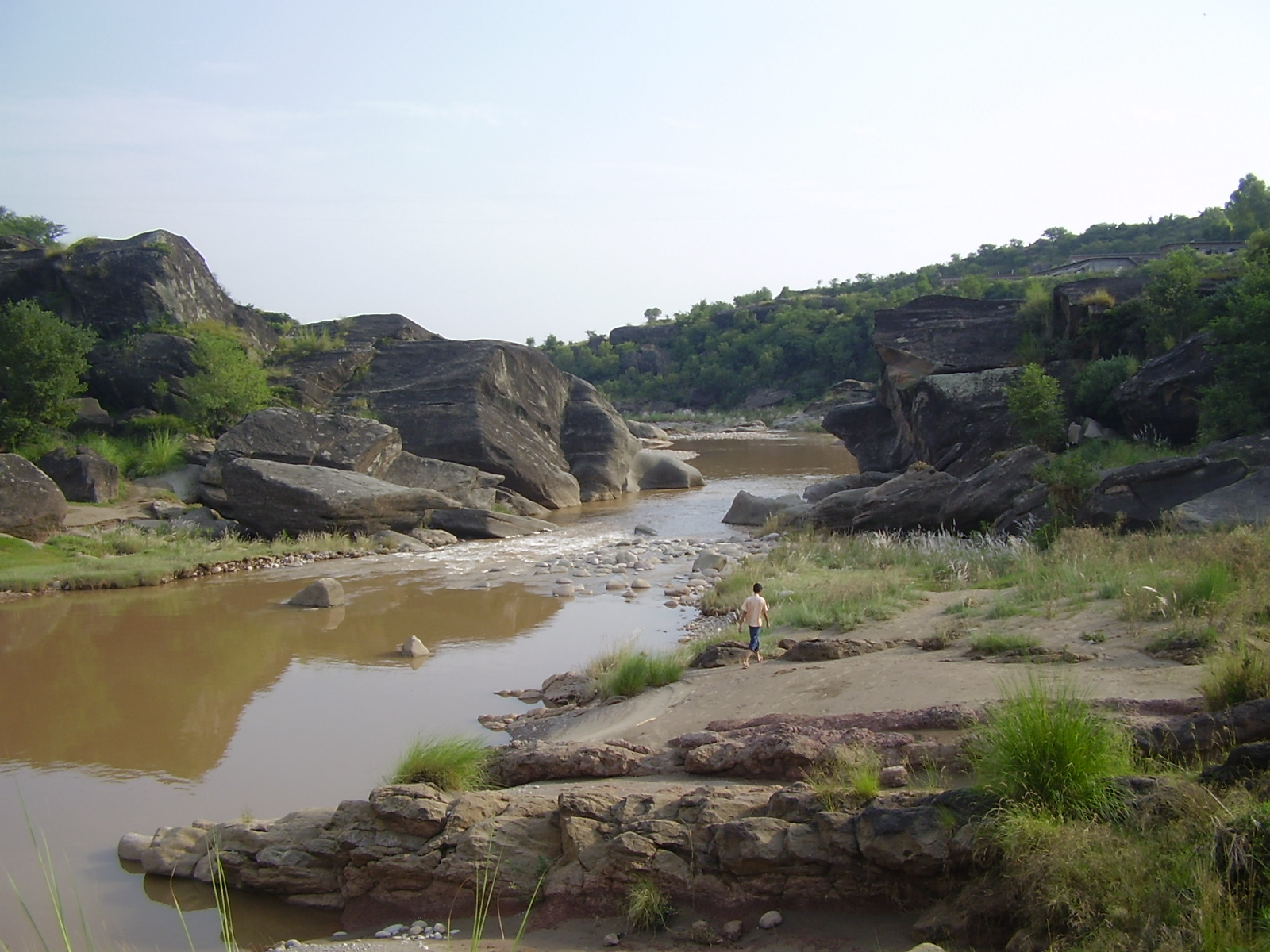
- Country: Pakistan
- Province: Punjab
- District: Rawalpindi
- Time zone: UTC+5 (PST)

Mandwaal is a village located in the Rawalpindi District in Punjab province of Pakistan. Mandwal was part of Attock District and was later merged with Rawalpindi District in the late 1970s. The village has a population of 2500-3000 people. The historical Soan River crosses through the village.

The mountain range known as Kheri Murat sprawls over 8,740 the hill's boundaries of Kheri touches Mandwal.

== Demographics ==
The village has a population of 1,115 people, according to the most recent Pakistan Census conducted in 2011.

== Transport ==
M2 motorway crosses through the village. The village can be accessed via the main Chakri road and motorway M2.

== Education ==
The village has a Government school for boys and girls but lacks proper education.

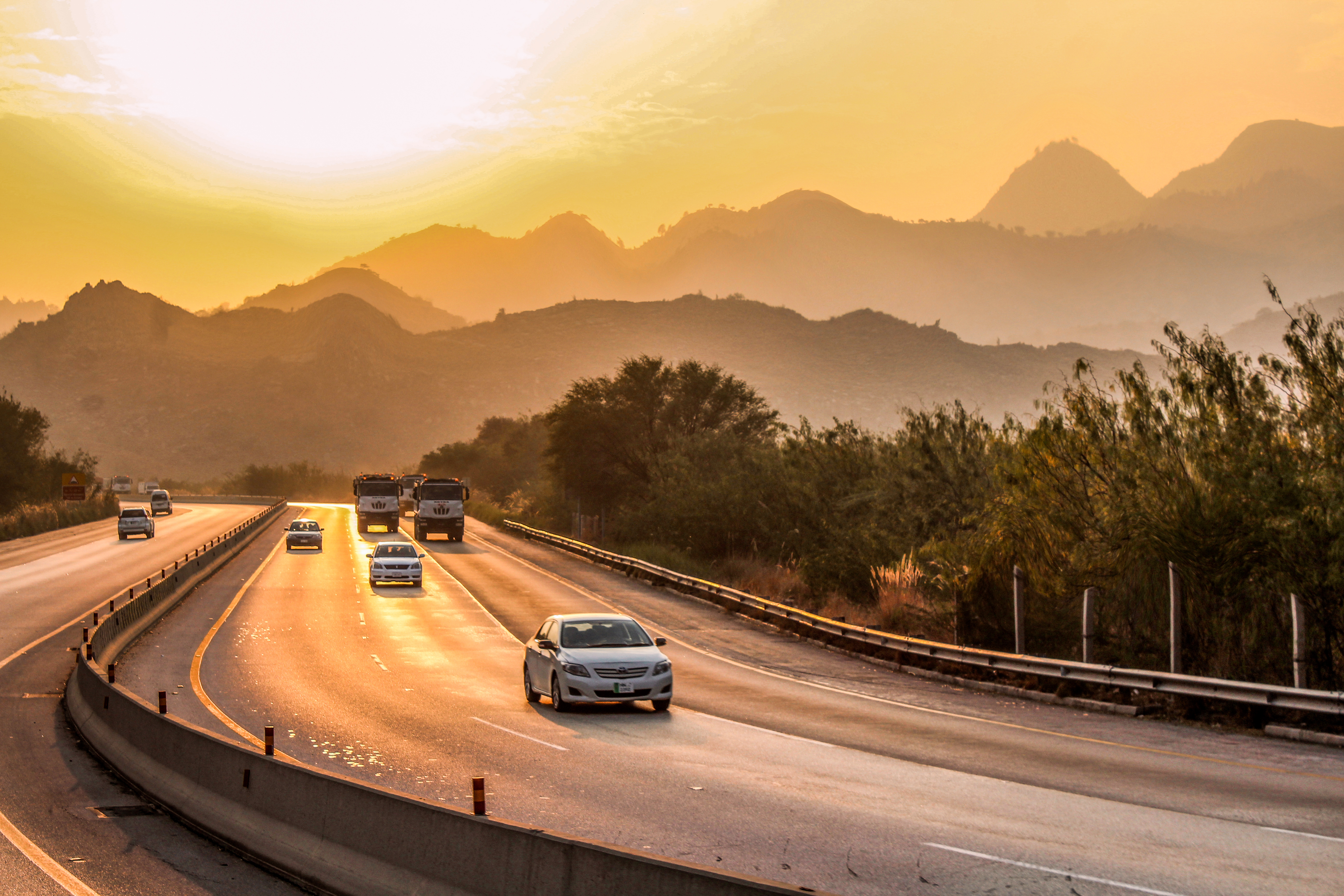

The Kheri Murat park touches village boundaries that provide recreational activities, including hiking and interaction with nature through ecotourism while providing employment to locals. After the establishment of the park, hunting, shooting, and poaching of wild species in it was declared illegal and considered a punishable act with heavy penalties. This was to be enforced within a three-mile radius of its boundaries.

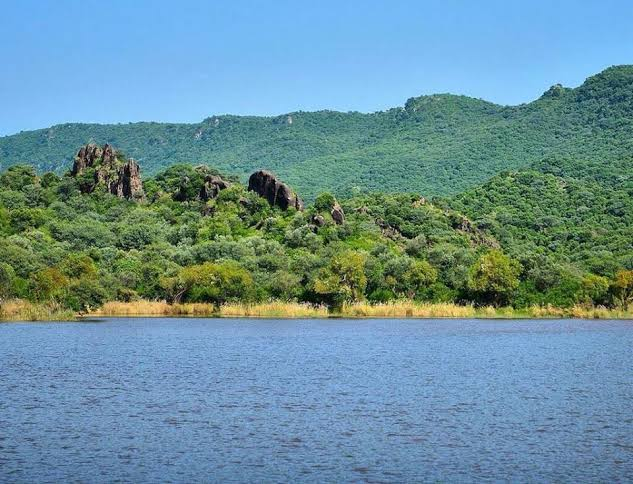
