= Nakka Khurd, Attock =

Nakka Khurd
- Village
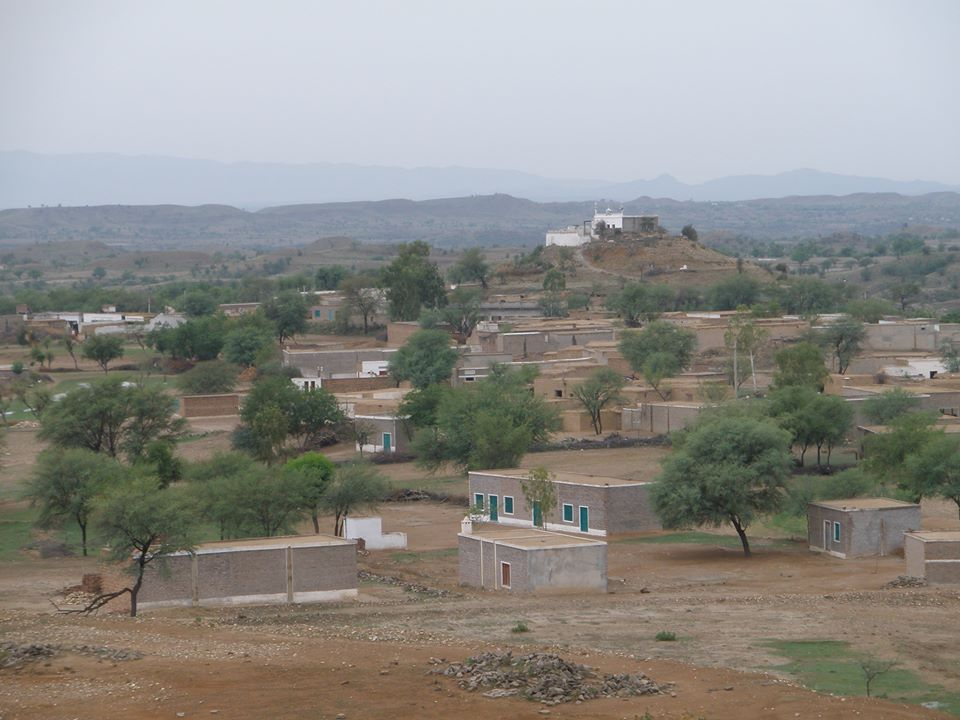
- The brick dwellings of the village nestled among hills and low mountains with a white mosque situated on a hilltop

- Location within Pakistan
- Coordinates: 33°41′33″N 72°27′12″E
- Country: Pakistan
- Province: Punjab
- District: Attock
- Tehsil: Jand
- Time zone: UTC+5 (PST)

Nakka Khurd (Urdu: ناکا خورد), also known as Purana Nakka (Urdu: پرانا ناکا), is a village in Jand Tehsil, Attock District, Punjab Province, Pakistan.

It is located near Makhad Sharif, which is situated on the bank of the Indus River.

== Climate ==
Nakka Khurd is situated in the Potohar Plateau of Pakistan. In summer the weather gets very hot, and in the winter the temperature goes down to the freezing point. People keep goats and sheep in large numbers and also camels.
