= List of birds of Islamabad =

This is a list of birds found in the Pakistani city of Islamabad. The Margalla Hills and Rawal Lake are notable bird watching locations.

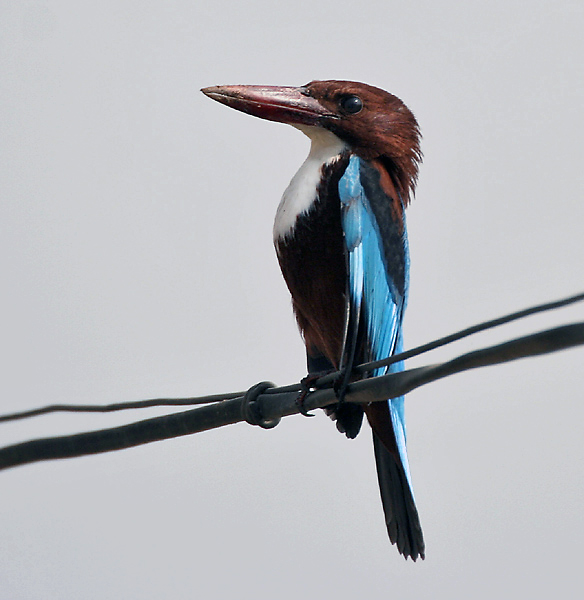
White-throated kingfisher

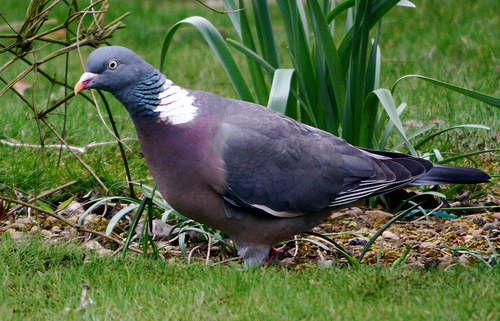
Wood pigeon

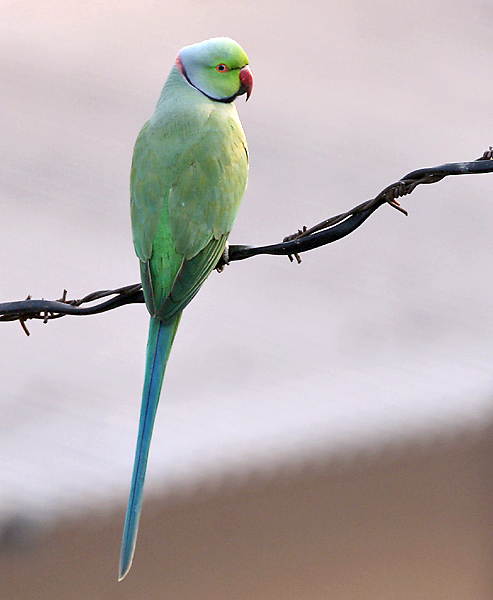
Rose-ringed parakeet

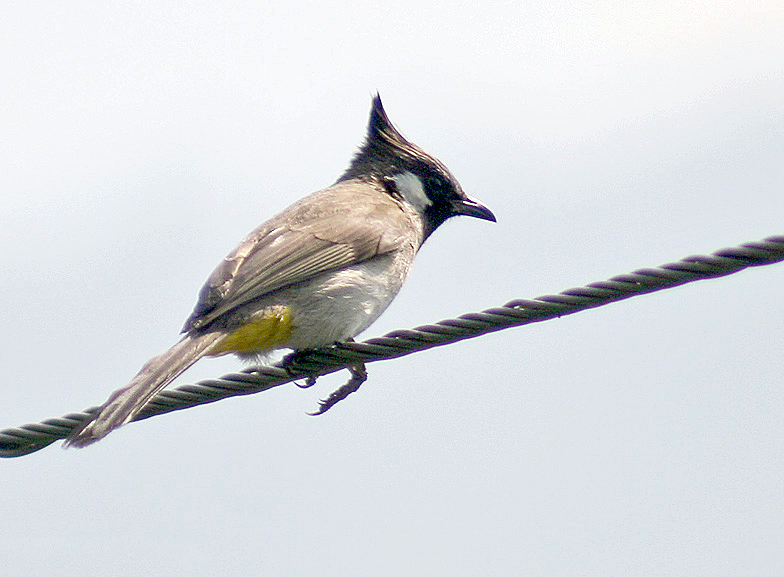
Himalayan bulbul

- Little grebe, Tachybaptus ruficollis
- Little cormorant, Microcarbo niger
- Great cormorant, Phalacrocorax carbo
- Black-crowned night heron, Nycticorax nycticorax
- Indian pond heron (paddybird), Ardeola grayii
- Cattle egret, Bubulcus ibis
- Little egret, Egretta garzetta
- Intermediate egret, Egretta intermedia
- Grey heron, Ardea cinerea
- Purple heron, Ardea purpurea
- Common teal, Anas crecca
- Black kite, Milvus migrans
- Shikra, Accipiter badius
- Long-legged buzzard, Buteo rufinus
- Eurasian kestrel, Falco tinnunculus
- Grey francolin, Francolinus pondicerianus
- Common quail, Coturnix coturnix
- Brown waterhen, Amaurornis akool
- White-breasted waterhen, Amaurornis phoenicurus
- Moorhen, Gallinula chloropus
- Eurasian coot, Fulica atra
- Red-wattled lapwing, Hoplopterus indicus
- Common sandpiper, Actitis hypoleucos
- Black-headed gull, Larus ridibundus
- Feral pigeon, Columba livia
- Wood pigeon, Columba palumbus
- Collared dove, Streptopelia decaocto
- Palm dove, Spilopelia senegalensis
- Spotted dove, Spilopelia chinensis
- Rose-ringed parakeet, Psittacula krameri
- Common koel, Eudynamys scolopacea
- Greater coucal, Centropus sinensis
- House swift, Apus affinis
- White-throated kingfisher, Halcyon smyrnensis
- Pied kingfisher, Ceryle rudis
- Hoopoe, Upupa epops
- Lesser golden-backed woodpecker, Dinopium benghalense
- Brown-fronted woodpecker, Dendrocopos auriceps
- Crested lark, Galerida cristata
- Small skylark, Alauda gulgula
- Brown-throated sand martin, Riparia paludicola
- Pale sand martin, Riparia diluta
- Barn swallow, Hirundo rustica
- Red-rumped swallow, Hirundo daurica
- Paddyfield pipit, Anthus rufulus
- Grey wagtail, Motacilla cinerea
- White wagtail, Motacilla alba
- Large pied wagtail, Motacilla maderaspatensis
- Himalayan bulbul, Pycnonotus leucogenys
- Red-vented bulbul, Pycnonotus cafer
- Dark-grey bushchat, Saxicola ferrea
- Blue rock thrush, Monticola solitarius
- Blue whistling thrush, Myophonus caeruleus
- Fan-tailed warbler, Cisticola juncidis
- Tawny prinia, Prinia inornata
- Yellow-bellied prinia, Prinia flaviventris
- Hume's leaf warbler, Phylloscopus humei
- White-throated fantail, Rhipidura albicollis
- Black-chinned babbler, Stachyris pyrrhops
- Common babbler, Turdoides caudatus
- Jungle babbler, Turdoides striatus
- Great tit, Parus major
- Bar-tailed treecreeper, Certhia himalayana
- Oriental white-eye, Zosterops palpebrosus
- Rufous-backed shrike, Lanius schach
- Black drongo, Dicrurus macrocercus
- House crow, Corvus splendens
- Brahminy starling, Sturnus pagodarum
- Common myna, Acridotheres tristis
- Bank myna, Acridotheres ginginianus
- House sparrow, Passer domesticus
- Alexandrine parakeet, Psittacula eupatria
- Green bee-eater, Merops orientalis
- Rufous treepie, Dendrocitta vagabunda
- Indian robin, Saxicoloides fulicatus
- Common greenshank, Tringa nebularia
- Marsh sandpiper, Tringa stagnatilis
- Grey treepie, Dendrocitta formosae
- Eurasian sparrowhawk, Accipiter nisus
- Verditer flycatcher, Eumyias thalassinus
- Paradise flycatcher, Terpsiphone paradisi
- Blue rock thrush, Monticola solitarius
- Blue whistling thrush, Myophonus caeruleus
- Orange headed thrush, Geokichla citrina
- Chestnut thrush, Turdus rubrocanus
- Crested kingfisher, Megaceryle lugubris
- Black headed jay, Garrulus lanceolatus
- Brown crake, Zapornia akool
