= Punjab Police College Sihala =

Pakistani training institution

- Police College Sihala Logo
- Abbreviation: PPC Sihala
- Formation: 1959
- Type: Police Training College
- Location: Sihala, Islamabad
- Members: All Federal & Provincial Police & Law enforcement agencies in Pakistan
- Commandant: DIG Ashfaq Ahmad Khan (PSP) Since June 2022
- Main organ: Punjab Police (Pakistan)
- Parent organization: Government of Pakistan
- Affiliations: Punjab Police (Pakistan)
- Website: Official website

Punjab Police College Sihala is a training institution of the Punjab Police in Sihala, Pakistan. The Police College Sihala was established in 1959 for providing training to police officials of all ranks. Sihala is the oldest and largest training college for police in Pakistan.

== Training courses ==
The college runs eight courses for various ranks of the Punjab Police.

- Probationer Course (Course for ASIs)
- Advance Course (Course for Inspectors)
- Upper School Course
- Intermediate School Course
- Lower School Course
- ICITAP and ATA Programme Courses
- Junior Commandant Course (Course for DSPs)
- Traffic Wardens Course
