= Soan River =

River in Punjab, Pakistan

Coordinates: 33°01′19″N 71°43′19″E

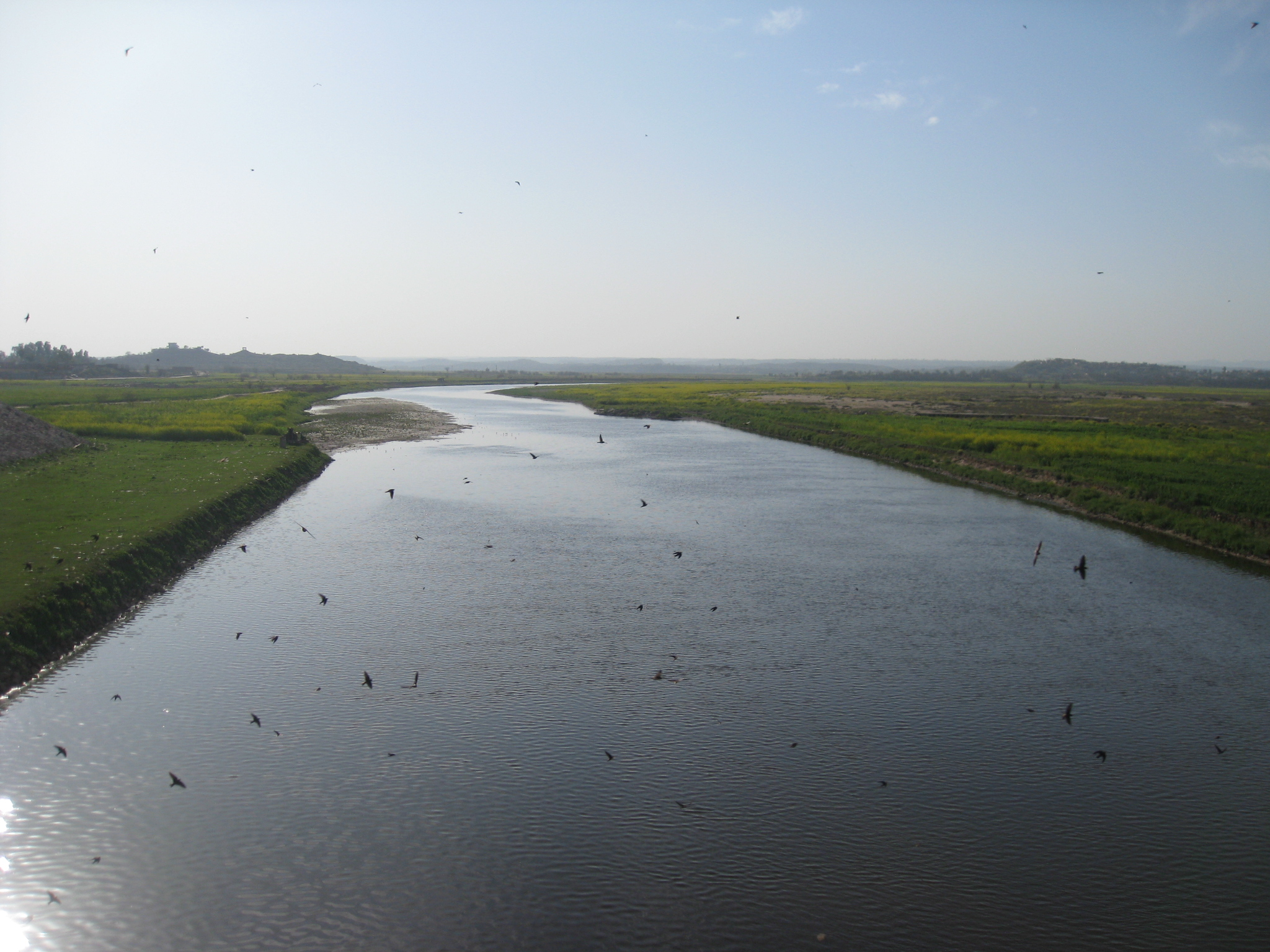

Location
- Country: Pakistan
- Province: Punjab

Physical characteristics
- Source: Murree Hills
- Mouth: Indus River
  - location: Makhad
- Basin size: 6,842 km^{2} (2,642 sq mi)
- Discharge
  - location: Makhad
  - average: 109 m^{3}/s (3,800 cu ft/s)
  - minimum: 38 m^{3}/s (1,300 cu ft/s)
  - maximum: 228 m^{3}/s (8,100 cu ft/s)

Basin features
- Progression: Indus→ Arabian Sea

Soan River, (Note: Punjabi: سواں دریا, romanized: Sōān Daryā) also Sawan and Sohan, is a 250-kilometre-long (160 mi) river in Punjab, Pakistan. It originates from the Murree Hills and drains into the Indus River near Makhad. A seasonal river, it is almost entirety fed by rainwater during monsoon.

== Course ==
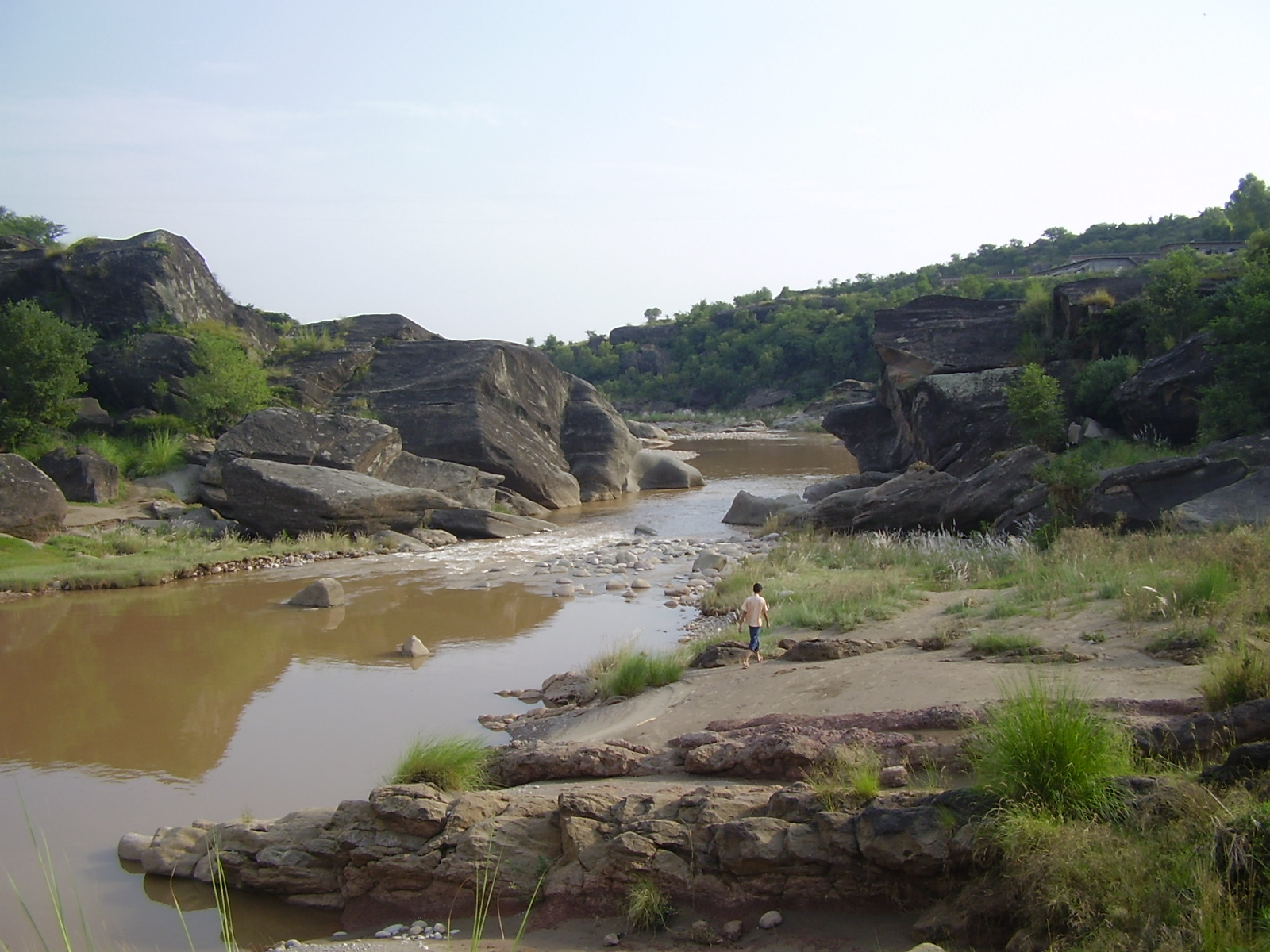
One of the many gorges of the Soan River

The Soan River drains much of the water of the Pothohar Plateau. It originates in the foothills of Patriata in Murree and supplies water to the Simly Dam, a reservoir for Islamabad. Near Pharwala Fort, Ling Nullah, following a relatively long course through Lehtrar and Kahuta, joins the Soan near Sihala on the southern side of village Gagri. The Islamabad Expressway crosses this stream near Sihala at the Kak Pul bridge. Two other streams, the Korang Nullah and the Lai Nullah, join the Soan just before and after the bridge, respectively. The Rawal Dam has been built on Korang Nullah. After following a path along a big curve, the stream reaches the proposed Kalabagh Dam site close to Pir Piai where it falls into the Indus River.

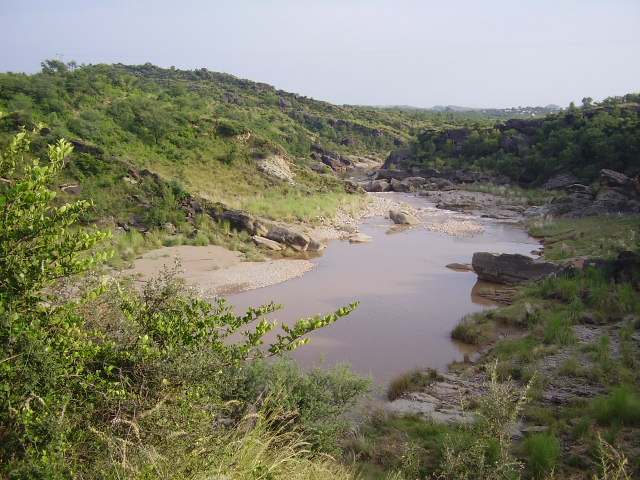
The Soan River cutting through Pothohar

The marine life of the river is currently endangered due to the discharge of chemicals of the Sihala Industrial State and effluent water of Rawalpindi city into it.

== Hydrology ==
The catchment area of Soan River is 6,842 km^{2} (2,642 sq mi) while its mean annual discharge at Makhad during the period 1960–2005 was 109 m^{3}/s (3,800 cu ft/s), with a minimum and maximum discharge of 38 m^{3}/s (1,300 cu ft/s) and 228 m^{3}/s (8,100 cu ft/s), respectively. However, a decreasing trend is observed in the mean annual discharge, owing to reduced rate of rainfall and construction of reservoirs in its catchment area.

== History ==
Oldest evidence of human activity in Pakistan has been found in the Soan River Valley. The human activity in the Soan Valley is believed to have originated during the Stone Age. Here some of the earliest signs of pre-modern humans, known as Soanians, have been discovered during the excavations of prehistoric mounds. Some relics found in the Soan Valley during the excavation process are believed to have originated over 500,000 years ago, during the Stone Age.

== See also ==
- Soan Dam
