= Kak Pul =

Kak Pul کاک پل
- Coordinates: 33.54456730955717°N 73.17700220784891°E
- Carries: Cars, buses, trucks
- Crosses: Soan River
- Locale: Islamabad Capital Territory
- Official name: Kaak Bridge
- Maintained by: Capital Development Authority

Characteristics
- No. of lanes: 4

The Kak Pul (Urdu: کاک پل), also written as Kaak Pul or Kaak Bridge, is a bridge in Islamabad, Pakistan. It is built on the Soan River on Islamabad Expressway, and serves as a vehicle entry-exit point for Islamabad.

== Location and geography ==
It is built on the Soan River at Islamabad Expressway. The Soan River is an important stream in the Pothohar Plateau region of Pakistan. It drains much of the water of Pothohar.

Famous places near Kak Pul are Sihala town, which is the location of National Police Academy of Pakistan, the largest police training college in Pakistan; Defence Housing Authority; Institute of Space Technology; Mohammad Ali Jinnah University campus; and Model Town Humak, a suburb town of Islamabad.
