= Sohal =

Surname

Sohal is a principal clan found among the Malwai speaking lineage of Jat Sikh, which were originated from Sohal township both (Khurd and Kalan) settled by Hari Singh Dhillon (Bhangi Misldar). They were primarily related to Deo, Hayer as well Aulak and avoid intermarriage among them. In modern time Sohal are chiefly found in Amritsar and Doaba region.

== Origin ==
It is a habitational name, associated with the Punjabi community of Jats, derived from the villages of Sohal Khurd and Sohal Khalsa in the Jalandhar district of Punjab, India.

== Notable people with the surname ==
- Avtar Singh Sohal (born 1938), Kenyan hockey player
- Chaudhry Yasin Sohal (born 1965), Pakistani politician
- Harry Sohal (1946-1994), Canadian politician
- Kashmir Singh Sohal, (born 1960), Indian politician
- Naresh Sohal (1939-2018), British composer of classical music
- Sunny Sohal (born 1987), Indian cricketer
