= Korang Nullah =

Stream in Pothohar Punjab, Pakistan

Korang River
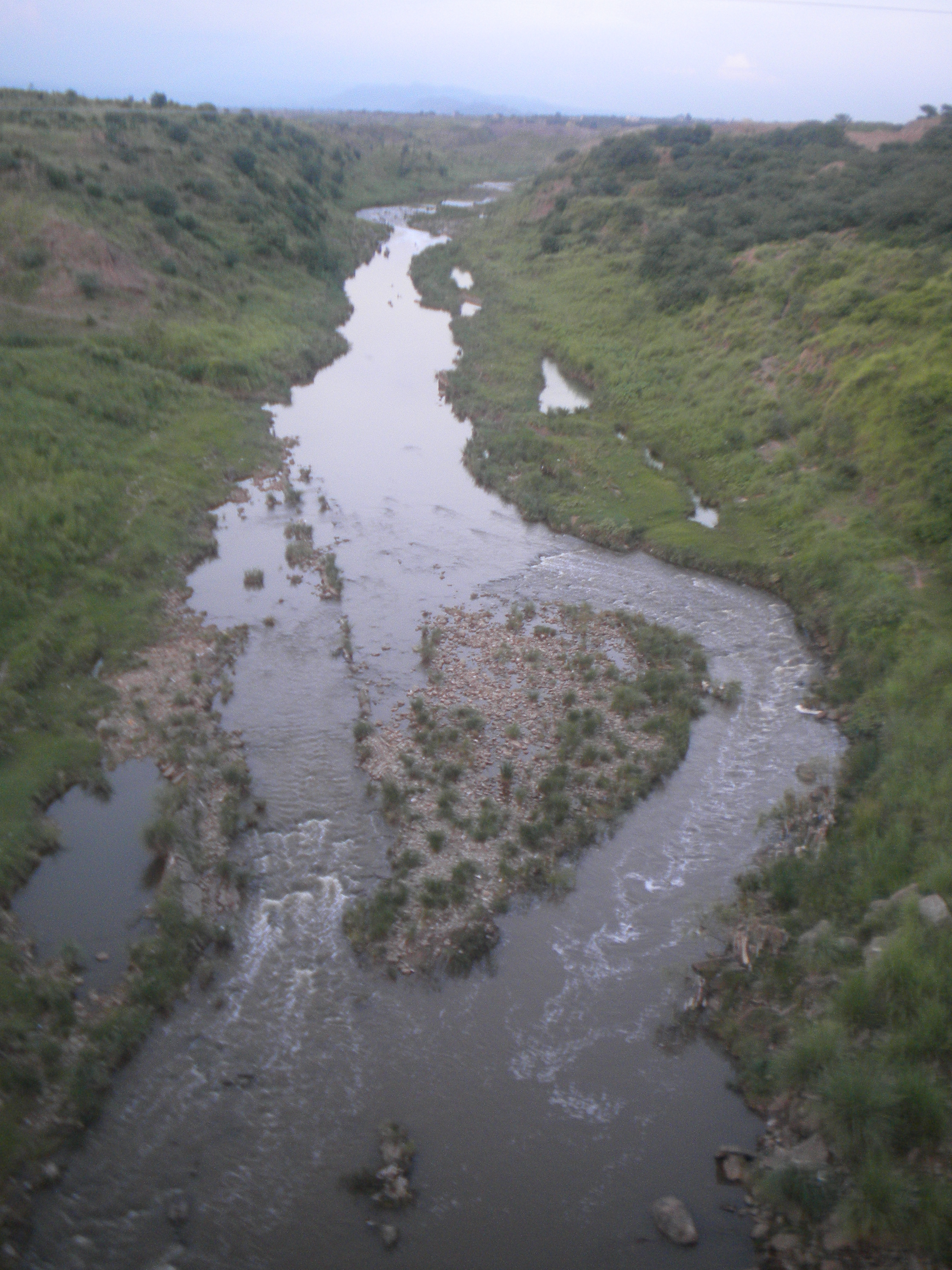

Location
- Country: Pakistan
- Province: Punjab

Physical characteristics
- Source: Murree
- Mouth: Soan River
  - coordinates: 33.553156545726075°N 73.10416129473751°E

Basin features
- Cities: Islamabad

The Korang Nullah is a stream which is a tributary nullah of Soan River in the Pothohar region of Punjab, Pakistan. It is fed by water from streams located in Murree Hills, and flows towards Islamabad.

The Korang and some other small streams originating from Margalla Hills feed the artificial Rawal Lake in Islamabad. Korang River is the outlet stream of Rawal Dam. This stream crosses the Islamabad Expressway from between Korang Town and Judicial Colony. The terrain of this stream is eye-catching, and the Lohi Bher Wildlife Park is located on the beautiful terrain on the left bank of Korang stream. Onward, this stream joins the Soan River before reaching the Grand Trunk Road. Just after this point, Lai Nullah also joins Soan River.

== See also ==
- Ling Nullah
