= Sihala ceylonicus =

Scientific classification
- Kingdom: Animalia
- Phylum: Arthropoda
- Subphylum: Chelicerata
- Class: Arachnida
- Order: Araneae
- Infraorder: Araneomorphae
- Family: Pholcidae
- Genus: Sihala
- Species: S. ceylonicus

Binomial name
- Sihala ceylonicus (O. Pickard-Cambridge, 1869)

Species of spider

Sihala ceylonicus, is a species of spider of the genus Sihala. It is known to be endemic to Sri Lanka, some suggest its presence in Malaysia as well.

== Taxonomy ==
Even though the generic name was changed to Sihala, most of the local universities and websites still use the name Pholcus ceylonicus in their research papers.

== Biology ==
It is a large eight-eyed cellar spider, easily distinguished from the shapes of procursus, bulb, male palpal trochanter apophysis, and epigynum. Male is about 7.3 mm in length, while female is somewhat larger than the male. Female's lateral spinnerets consists with about six cylindrically shaped spigots.

== See also ==
- List of Pholcidae species
