= Soan Dam =

Proposed dam in Potohar region, Pakistan

- Location: Potohar region, Pakistan
- Purpose: Water storage, Power generation
- Status: Proposed
- Construction cost: $7 billion
- Owner: Government of Pakistan

Dam and spillways
- Impounds: Soan River
- Dam volume: 38 million acre-feet (47 km^{3})

Power Station
- Installed capacity: 5,240 MW

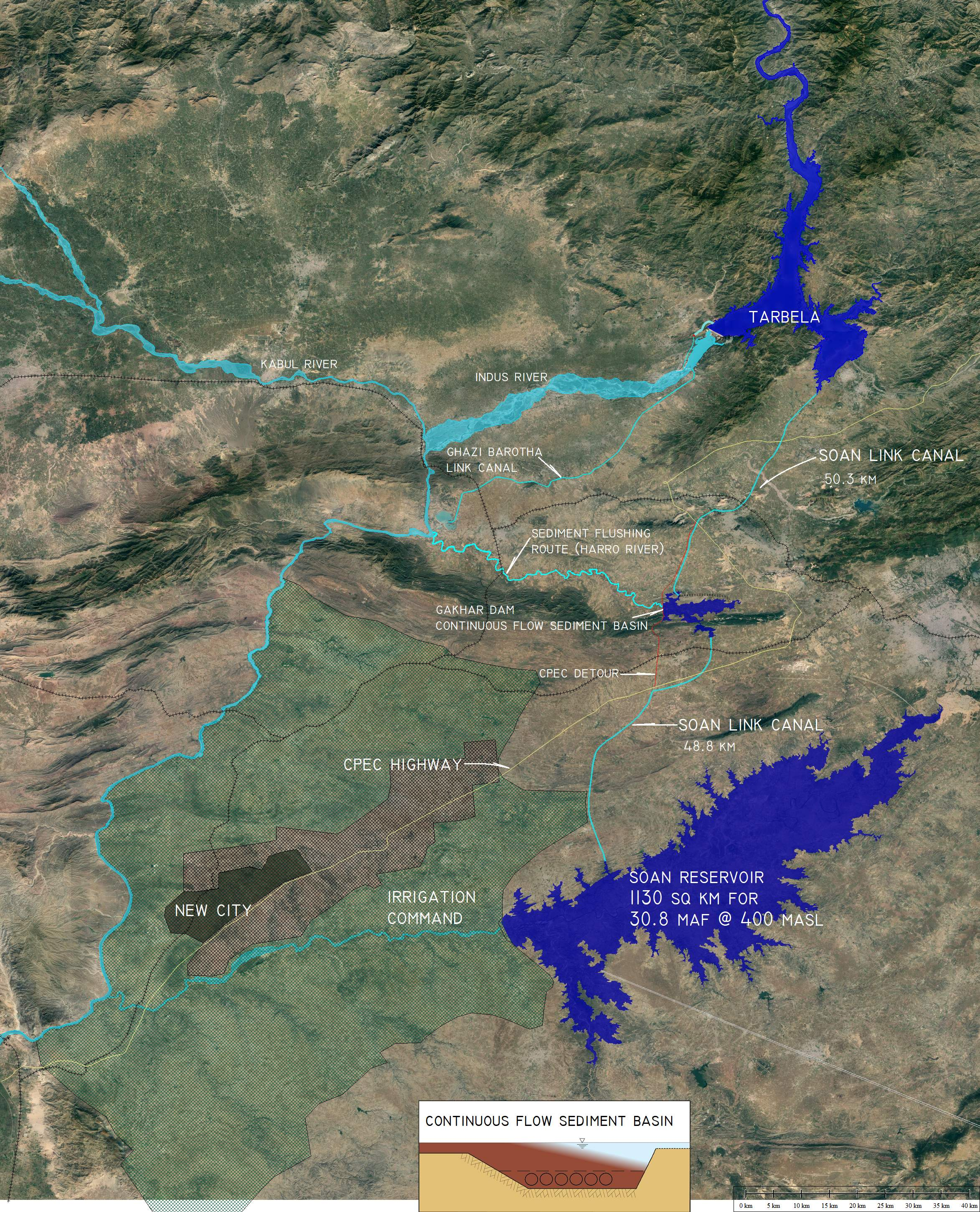

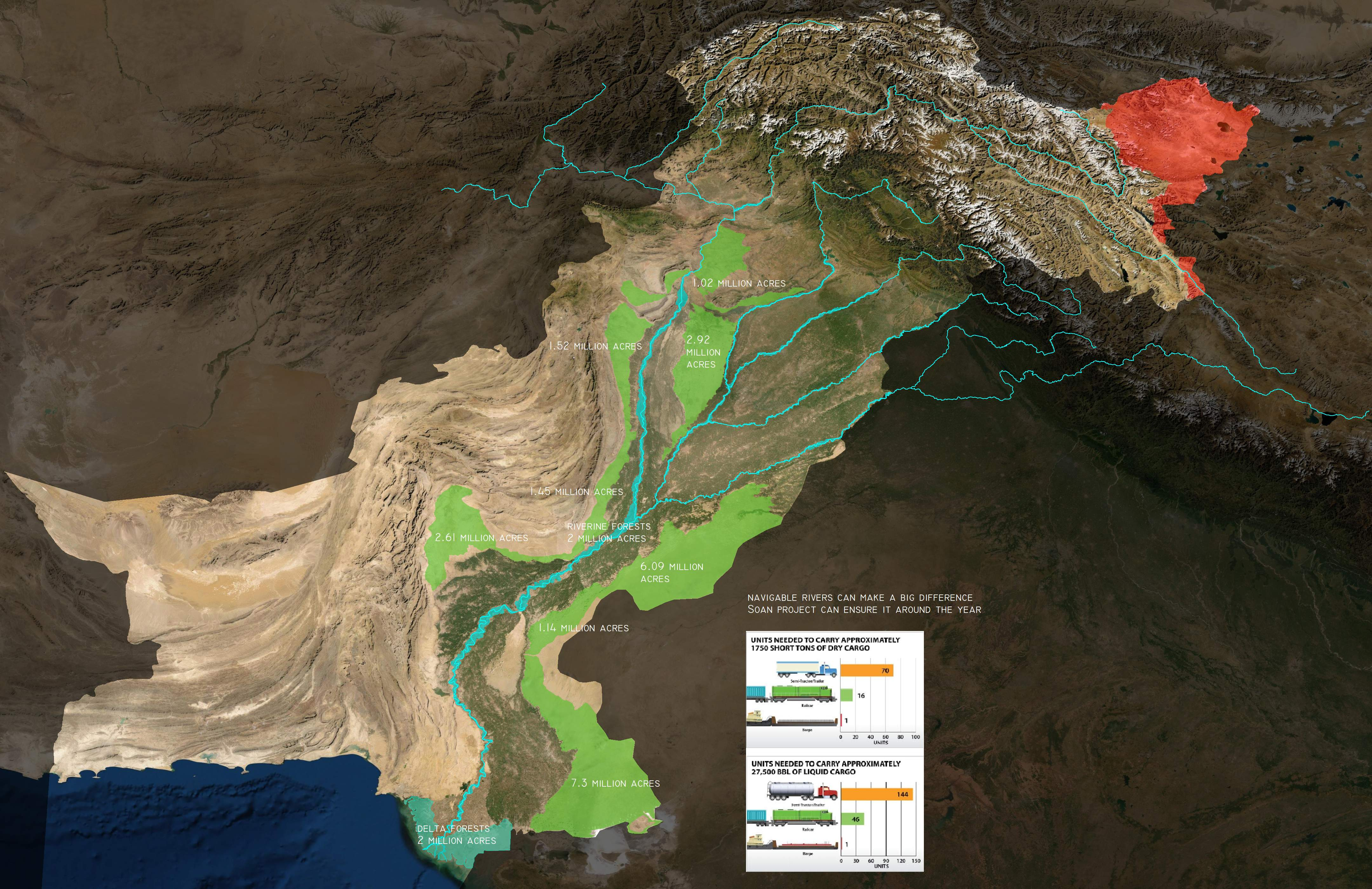
Irrigation and Environmental Command

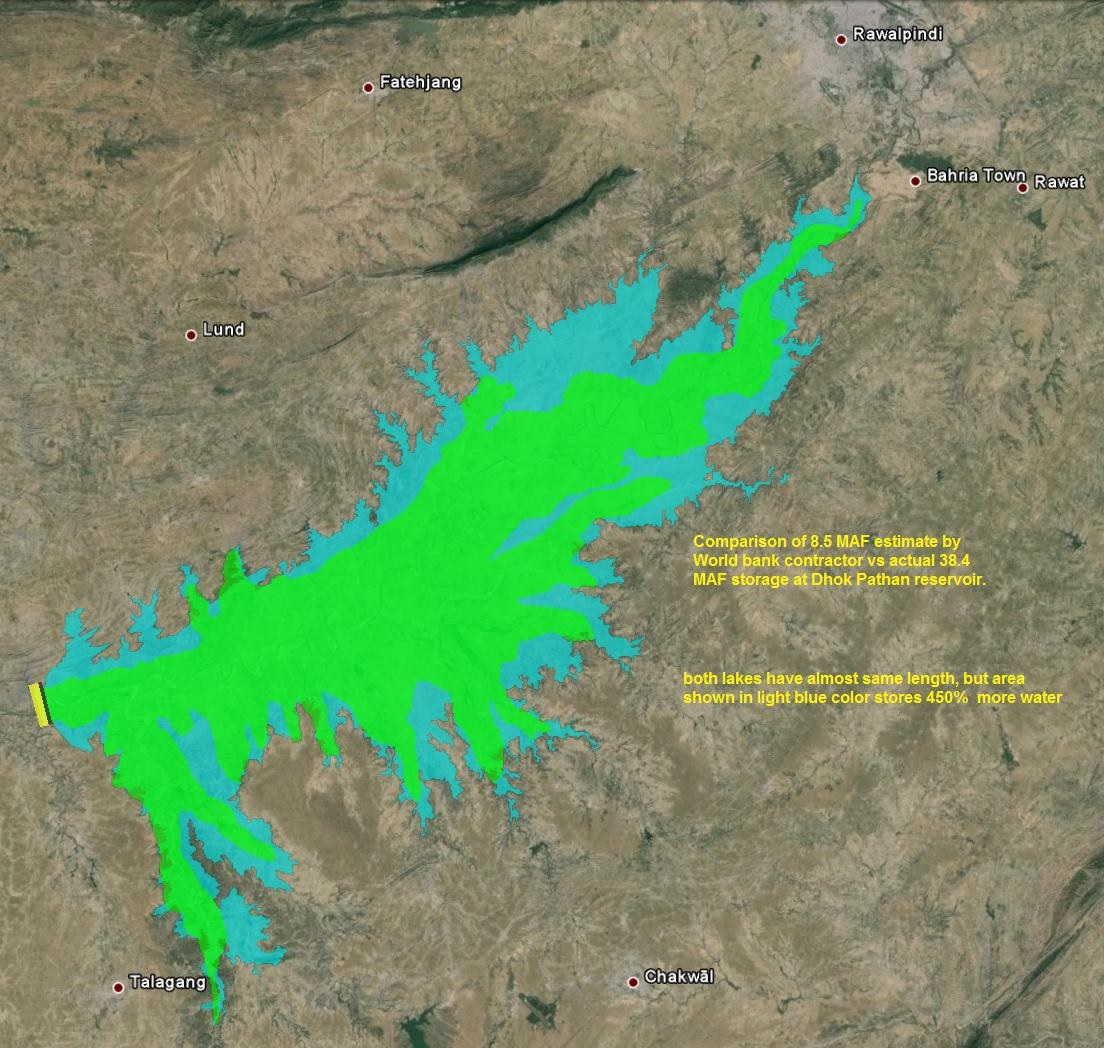
Soan Lake limits 38 MAF vs 8.5 MAF

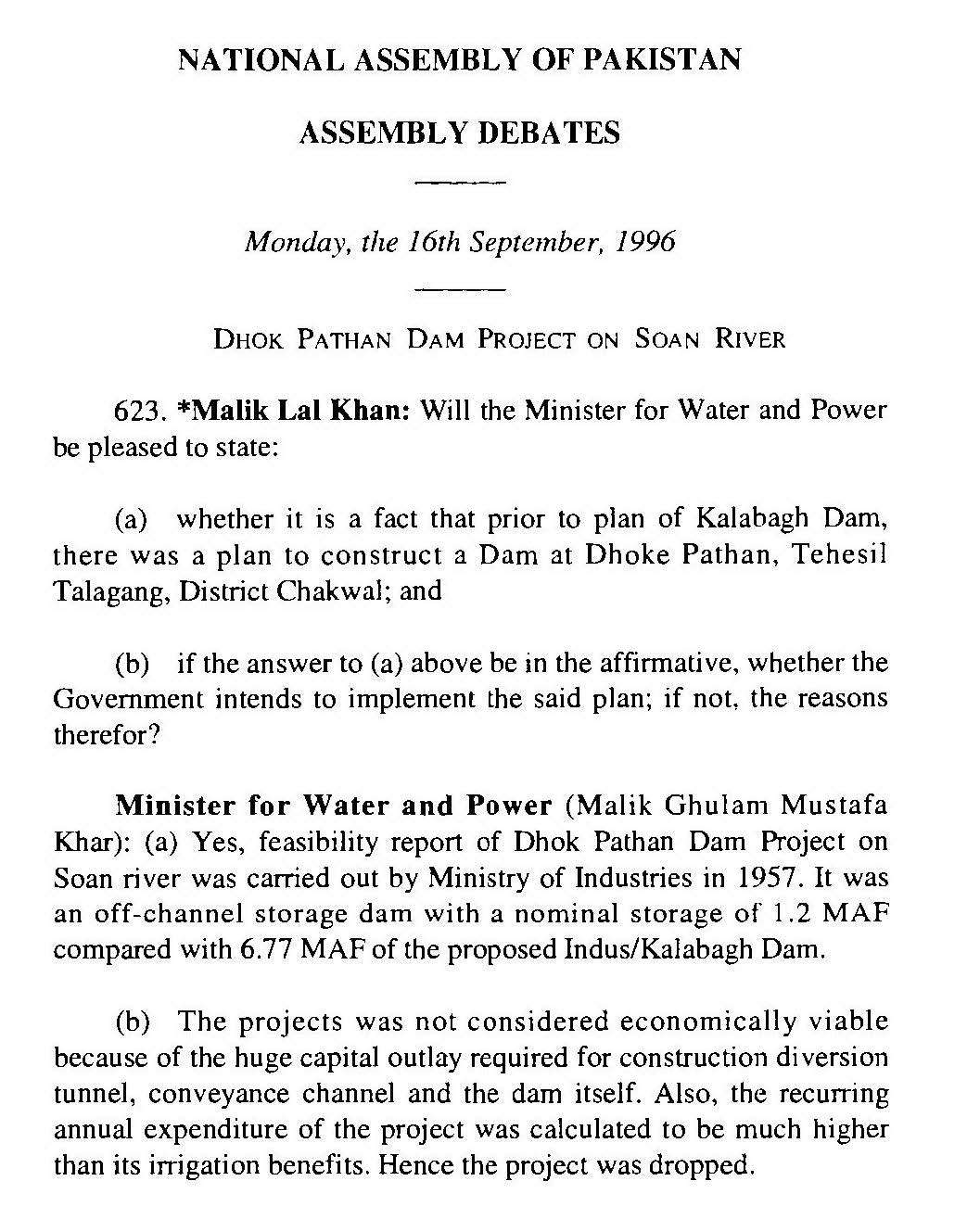
1996 Statement of Minister of Water and Power

Soan Dam is a proposed dam on the Soan River in the Potohar region of Pakistan. The dam has a proposed storage capacity of 38 million acre-feet (47 km^{3}) and a power generation capacity of 5,240 megawatts (MW). The dam is being proposed to address the water scarcity, Flood control/harvesting, energy crisis and Economic recovery of Pakistan.

The Soan River is a perennial river that originates in the Murree Hills and flows through the Potohar region. Soan gorge has enormous storage potential (100+MAF) with multiple suitable dam sites between Rawalpindi and Soan-Indus confluence. An earth fill dam near Dhok Pathan is proposed to store Indus water diverted from Tarbela's left bank Siran Pocket near Haripur.

== History ==
Site was initially studied by Dam Investigation Circle in 1955. During 1960's, World bank proposed 8.5 MAF storage design which was ignored for next three decades and finally downgraded to 1 MAF design in 2002. Unfortunately, storage capacity was never measured because legacy techniques needed a lot of time and resources. Even World bank created an estimated map for 8.5 MAF proposal which was almost same for 5 times larger capacity. See attached map for comparison.

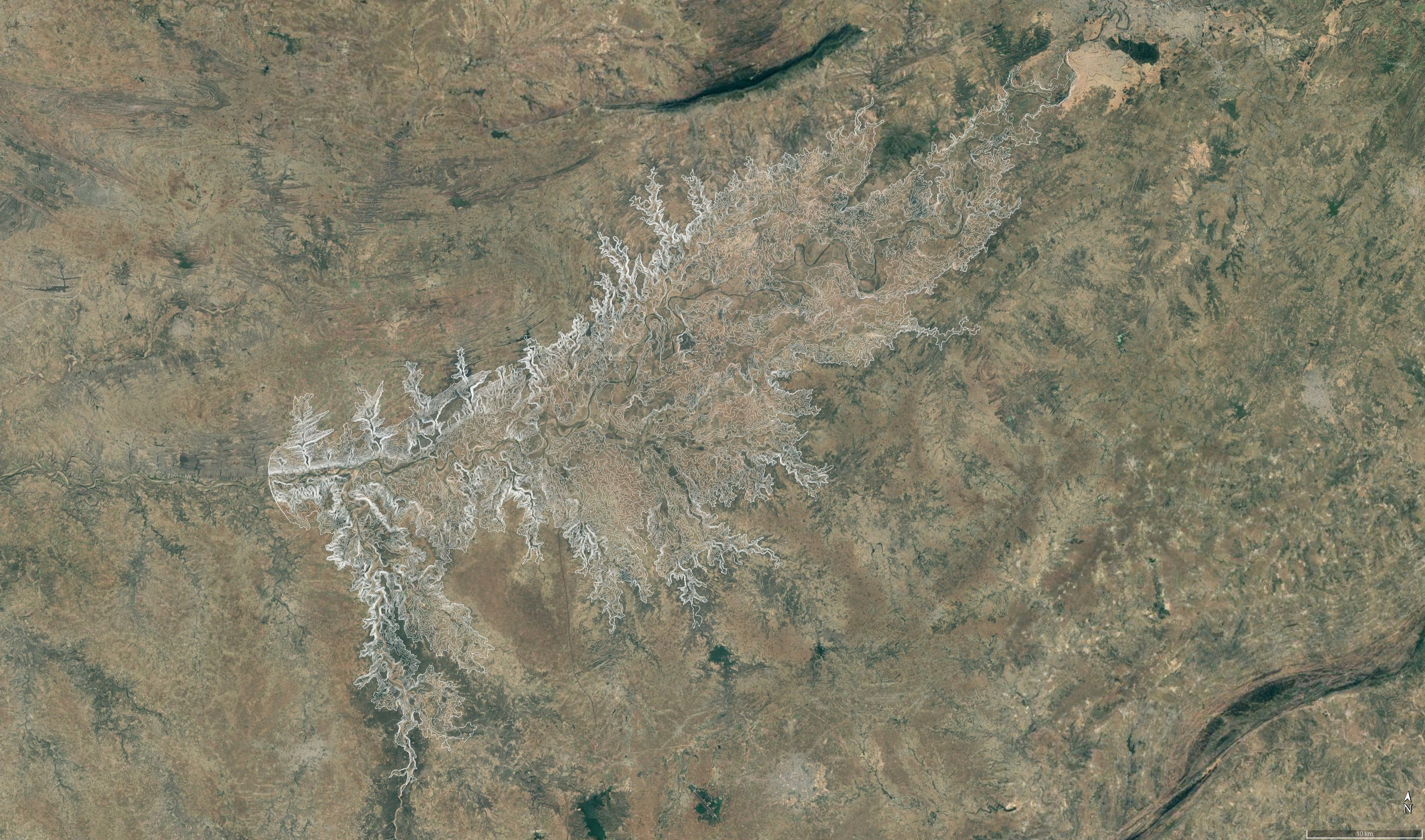
Soan Contour map

== Design ==
Storage capacity can be decided per requirement. at an optimal retention level of 405 MASL, 38 MAF is achieved. Tarbela's dead level in 2024 is around 427 MASL (and increasing). diverting 30 to 45 MAF of water near dead level will resume the sediment transport through Tarbela to be flushed back to Indus via Haro river.

At lowest level on 427 MASL, leaving another 10 m for high flow canal, Dhok Pathan offers more than 45 MAF storage capacity.

Soan Reservoir is a side valley storage type, located at a convenient elevation to serve multiple roles.

- It allows a natural head for a 100 km long feeder channel for filling the reservoir during flood days. This link channel can flush sediment from Tarbela and release it back into Indus below Barotha exit.
- During extreme floods, It can divert Tarbela upstream flow indefinitely to ease Kabul and Swat floods.
- It can allocate storage for year around environmental flow in Indus river. This will improve water quality, wildlife and allow economical river transportation.
- Environmental flow will resume sediment transport to pre-Tarbela levels.
- Its drawdown level is 160+ feet higher than crest of Kalabagh dam. Soan Dam's elevation can command additional 32 million acres in all four provinces for high efficiency precision irrigation.
- Every inundated acre will irrigate 140 acres of new land.
- Soan storage can split and absorb extreme floods in Indus basin.
- It can balance flow with Right and left bank catchments and tributaries of Indus river.
- Diverted water has average energy of 30,000 GWH between Tarbela and Kalabagh, which translates into an average output of 4400 MW, mostly in ROR mode.
- Soan site is located 40 km east of Kalabagh site. It doesn't effect the Kalabagh design, but Kalabagh may never be needed once Soan is built.
- Cost wise, it offers ten times cheaper storage than alternative proposals.
- It has design conflict with current design of expensive yet far inferior project of Akhori dam (6 MAF), whose raised reservoir inundates axis of Soan link canal.

== Flood Control ==
Soan can keep Tarbela's 5.8 MAF storage buffer ready for absorbing Upper Indus floods around the year, while continuously diverting flow towards Soan and generating more electricity than Tarbela. Upper Indus floods can be induced by landslides, GLOF or Monsoon like 2010. Apart from unexpected floods, Tarbela has annual flow of 64 MAF, second only to Kalabagh's 92 MAF. but Kalabagh's storage capacity is minuscule compared to Tarbela-Soan model.

Kalabagh dam increases upstream flooding risk in vale of Peshawar, while Soan can indefinitely absorb upper Indus floods, to spare the main Indus bed from Attock to Kalabagh to ease the drainage of Swat and Kabul floods. An extreme scenario of sustained flow of 200000 to 300000 cusecs for months with multiple peaks of 6 to 8 lac cusecs (like 2010) will never become a problem.

During Monsoon season, Chenab and Kabul flow can easily handle irrigation demand. While Jhelum and Indus are always flexible to store or release. This will allow collection of 25 to 50 MAF of floodwater, instead of spilling into Arabian sea within few weeks. 6 MAF dedicated storage can ensure 15000 cusec of environmental flow from Attock gorge to Indus delta 24x365

Sindh and Balochistan are facing a remarkable rise in intensity and frequency of local floods due to global warming. most of times such floods coincide with Indus floods. Lower Indus plains are much flatter than Swat kabul basin, that's why water takes several months to drain/evaporate. If Indus has better upstream flood control, situation will become much better downstream.

== Energy & Storage ==
Mega projects in Pakistan are always poorly understood, designed and prioritized due to lack of information and technical skills. As a result, overdesigned and redundant features coupled with cost overruns makes it ideal playground for "economic hitmen".

Skardu/Katzara dam has been showcased for decades for its 35 MAF storage capacity, and 15,000 MW hydroelectric capacity. storage wise, the number is theoretically correct, but Skardu Airport inundates at 2MAF and Skardu City inundates at 8 MAF. If it is ever built, 35 MAF storage at Skardu will drastically decrease the cost of downstream dams on main Indus stem. Somehow Installed capacity of hydroelectric projects gets focus regardless of its economical disadvantage. This flawed strategy will cost the country around $60+ Billion in expensive storage, tunneling cost and redundant turbines. Current designs from Tarbela to Skardu don't include the provision of a 35 MAF storage upstream, which is awkward.

Skardu's Hydroelectric potential of 15,000 MW is highly inaccurate. Actual figure is 10 times lower and sadly enough, for last several decades, publicly well known proponents of this proposal don't know about it. This is a simple example of state of affairs.

Bigger picture is misunderstood or deliberately ignored for some unknown reasons. Meanwhile, Tarbela, Dasu, Basha, Bunji, Pattan, Thakot, Yulbo, Tungas are all over designed and over-priced without an upstream storage.

Silted up Tarbela's 4th and 5th extensions are almost redundant but "Installed Capacity" gets attention. Energy can be easily understood in kwh (or a UNIT), but deceptive use of Installed capacity only multiples the energy and project costs. Extra turbines will sit idle or move to future upstream HPP's like Pattan or Thakot.
