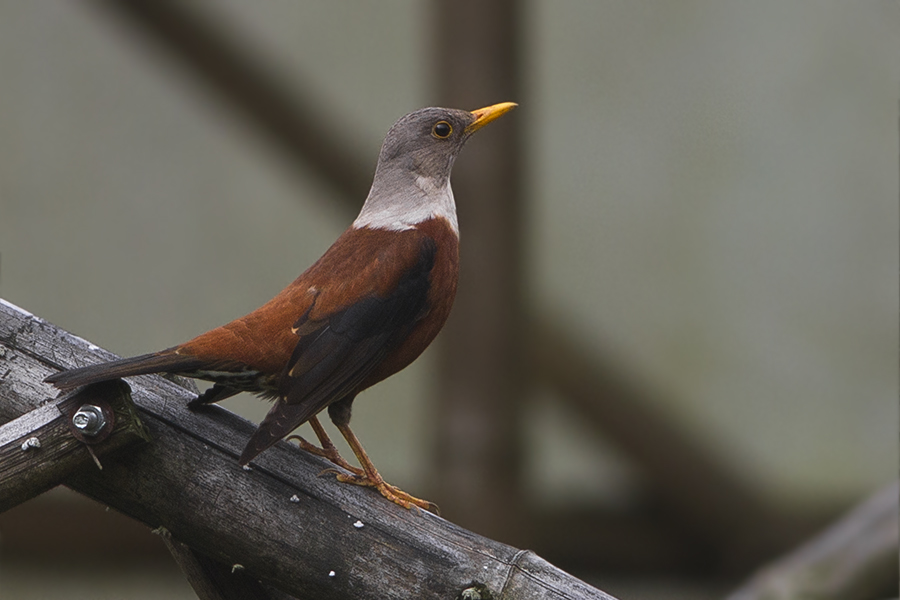
- Male (♂) from Khangchendzonga Biosphere Reserve, West Sikkim, India

Conservation status
- Least Concern (IUCN 3.1)

Scientific classification
- Kingdom: Animalia
- Phylum: Chordata
- Class: Aves
- Order: Passeriformes
- Family: Turdidae
- Genus: Turdus
- Species: T. rubrocanus

Binomial name
- Turdus rubrocanus Gray, JE & Gray, GR, 1847

= Chestnut thrush =

Species of bird

The chestnut thrush (Turdus rubrocanus) is a species of bird in the family Turdidae. It breeds in the western Himalayas and central/southwestern China; it winters in Eastern Himalaya and northern Southeast Asia. Its natural habitat is temperate forests.

It is socially monogamous, but extra-pair partners are common. It exhibits sexual dichromatism, a form of sexual dimorphism in which males and females have different plumage colors. However, this difference is typically not noticeable to human observers.

== Gallery ==
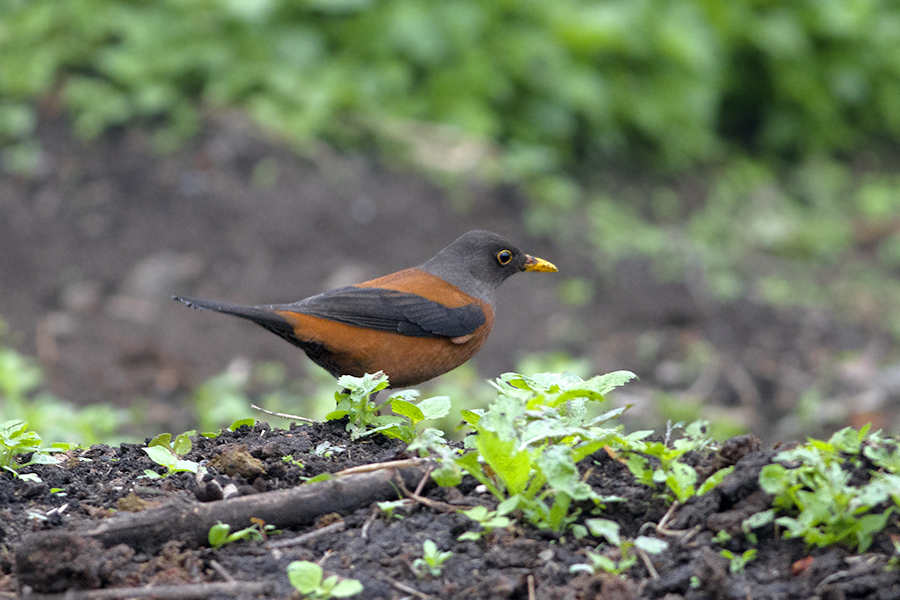
From Pangolakha Wildlife Sanctuary in East Sikkim, Sikkim.

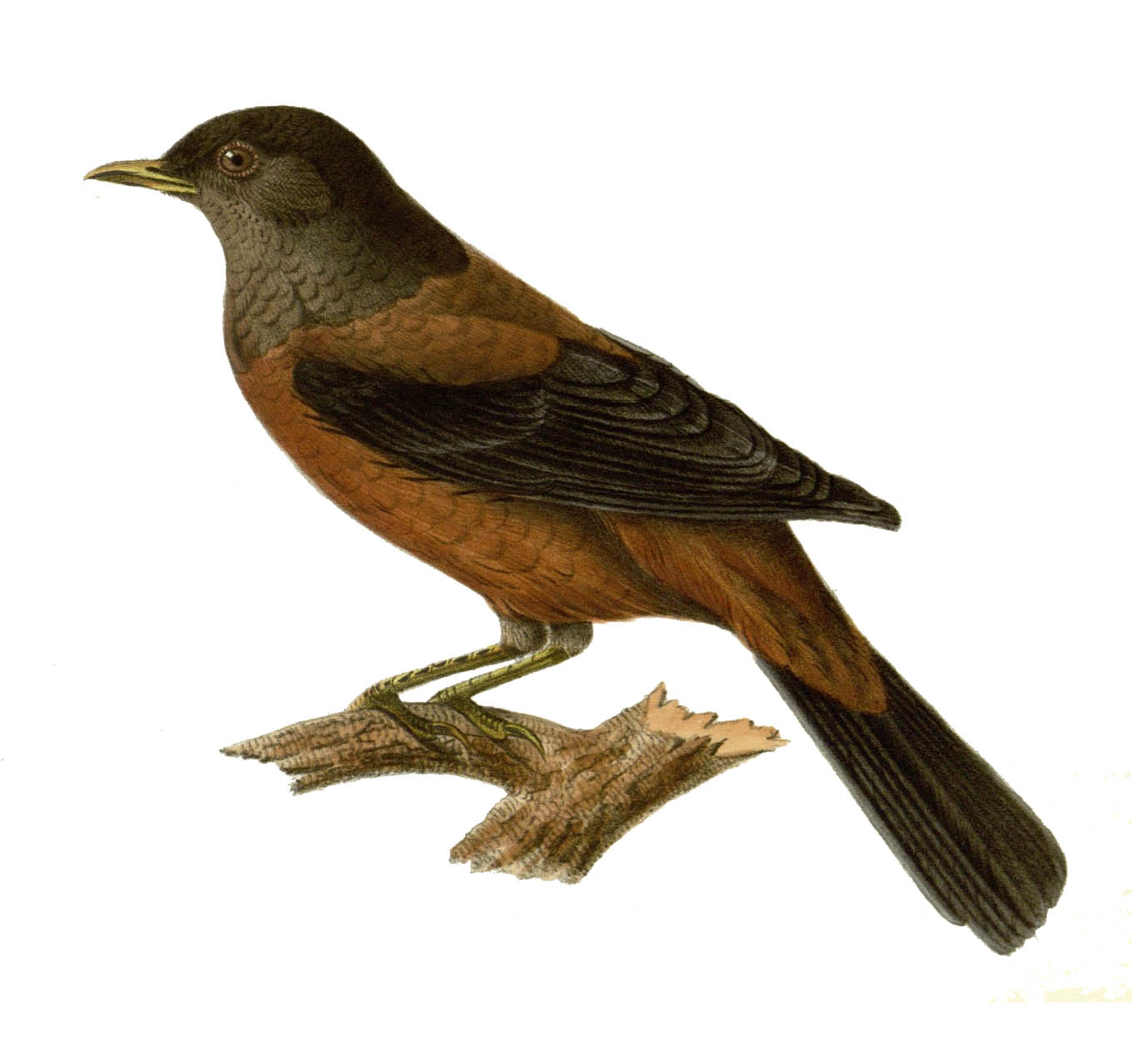
Illustration by J. Hüet (1873)
