= Sihala (spider) =

Scientific classification
- Domain: Eukaryota
- Kingdom: Animalia
- Phylum: Arthropoda
- Subphylum: Chelicerata
- Class: Arachnida
- Order: Araneae
- Infraorder: Araneomorphae
- Family: Pholcidae
- Genus: Sihala; Huber, 2011

Type species
- Sihala ceylonicus (O. Pickard-Cambridge, 1869)

Species
- See text

Diversity
- 2 species

Genus of spiders

Sihala is a genus of cellar spiders in the family Pholcidae, containing two species. The two species were once classified in the genus Pholcus, but were moved due to the absence of the characteristic sclerites shown in the bulb, and the unusually small and simple procursus.

== Species ==
- Sihala alagarkoil Huber, 2011 — India
- Sihala ceylonicus (O. P.-Cambridge, 1869) — Sri Lanka, possibly Malaysia
