= Makhad =

- Village
- Location within Pakistan
- Coordinates: 33°8′0″N 71°44′0″E
- Country: Pakistan
- Province: Punjab
- District: Attock
- Tehsil: Jand
- Time zone: UTC+5 (PST)

Makhad (Urdu, Punjabi: مکھڈ) is a historical Town in Attock District of Punjab province of Pakistan. It is the place where Soan River falls into the fast-flowing Indus River.

== People ==
People groups of Makhad include the major Paracha and clan which are settled through Gandhara to Attock.
