= Ling Nullah =

River in Pakistan

Coordinates: 33.5413°N 73.1864°E

The Ling Nullah flows in the northern Punjab, Pakistan. It starts in the foothills of the Lehtrar area near Kahuta and, flowing and cutting its way through the hilly area, it meets the Soan River near Sihala. The road that joins Islamabad and Azad Kashmir passes it twice. Kingfishers also hunt fish at this stream.

Ling Stream

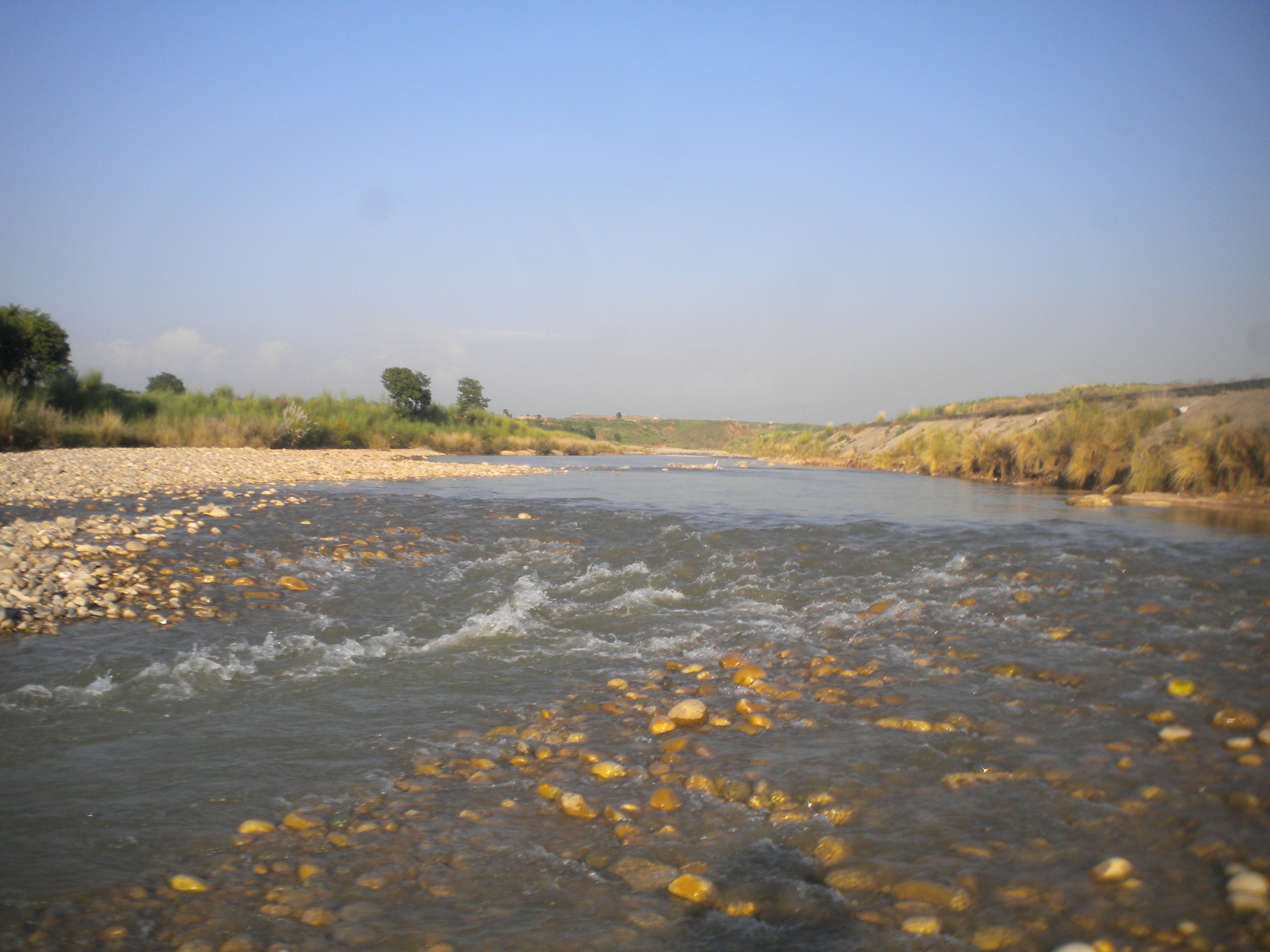

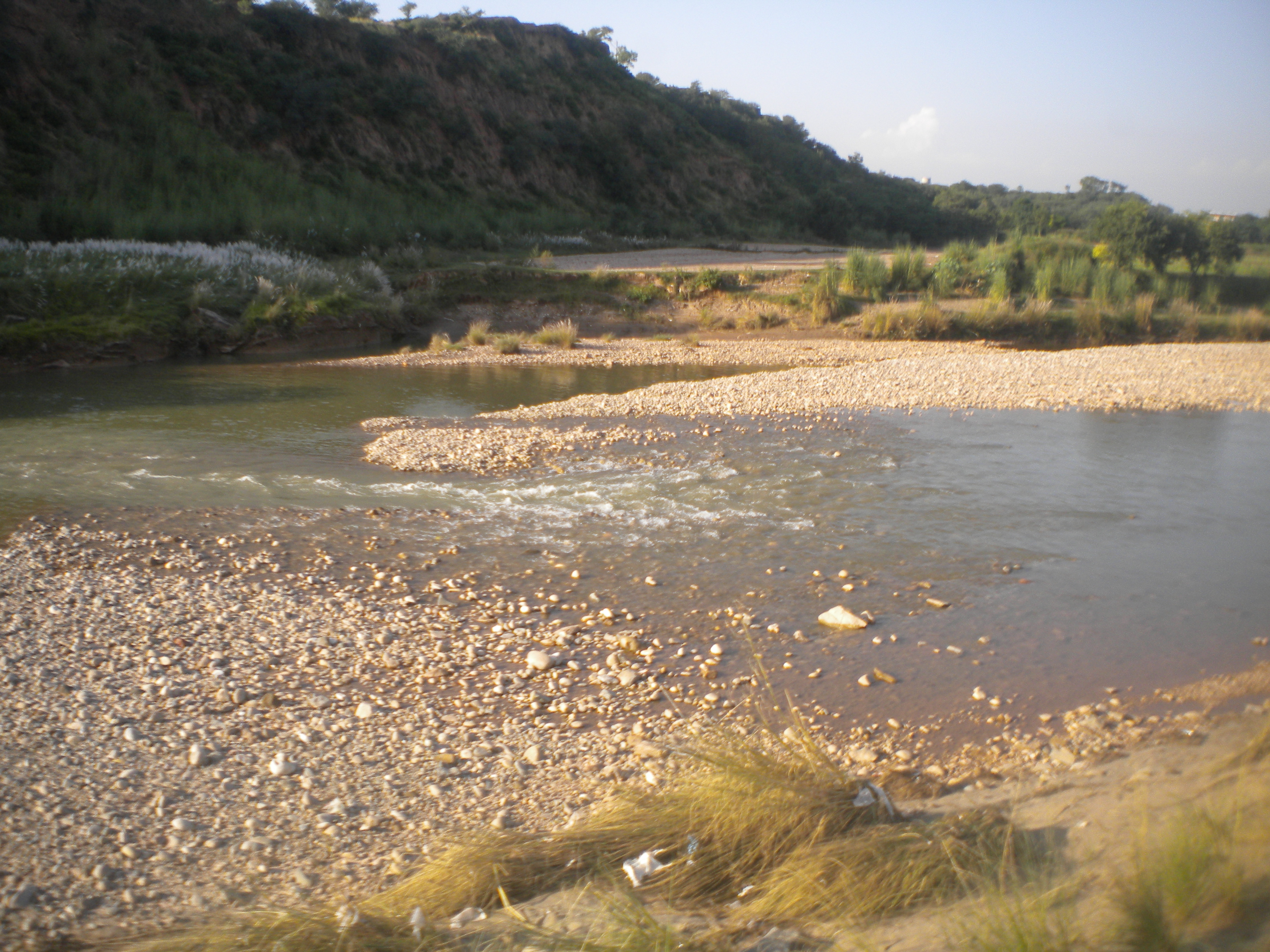

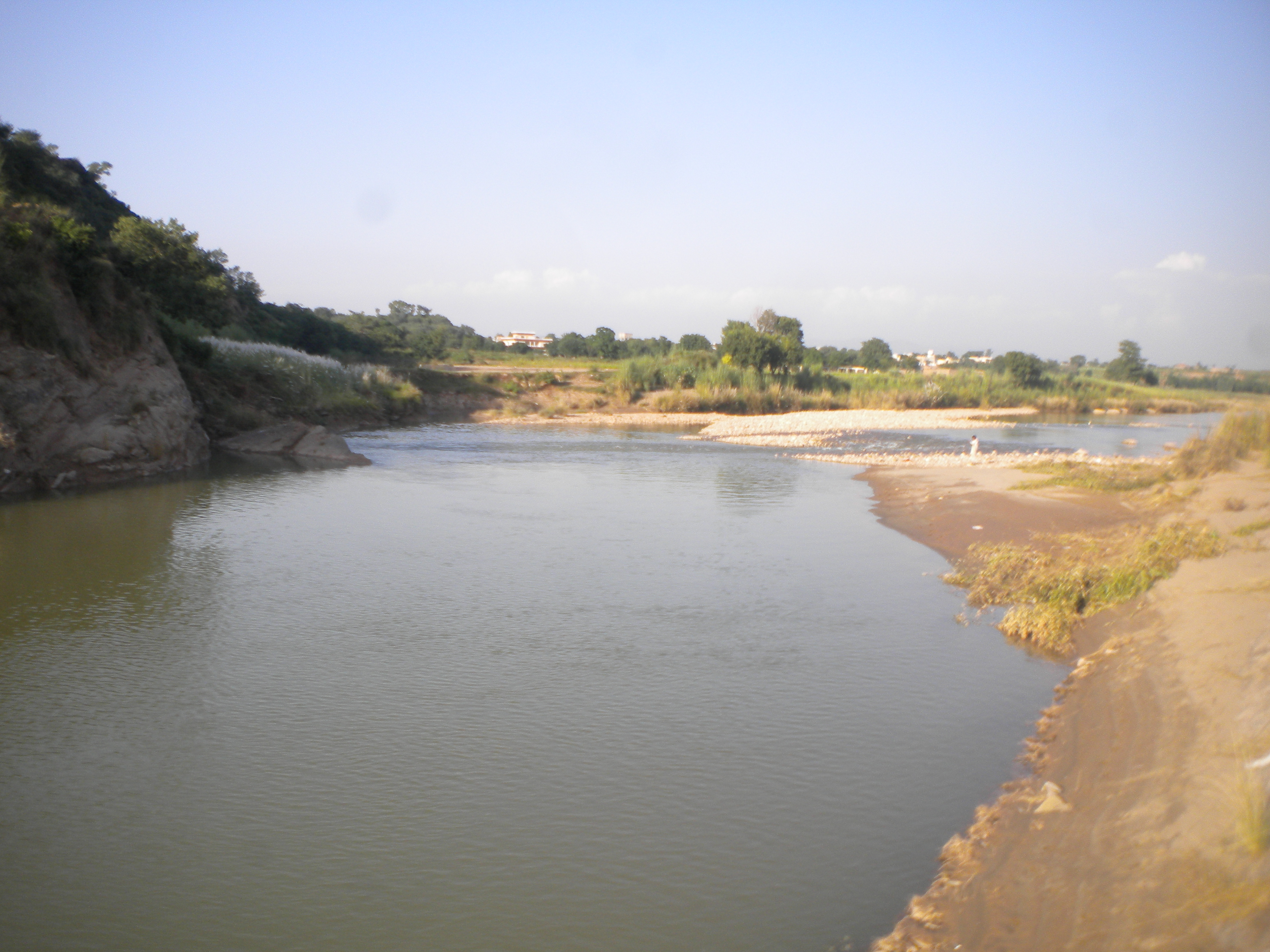

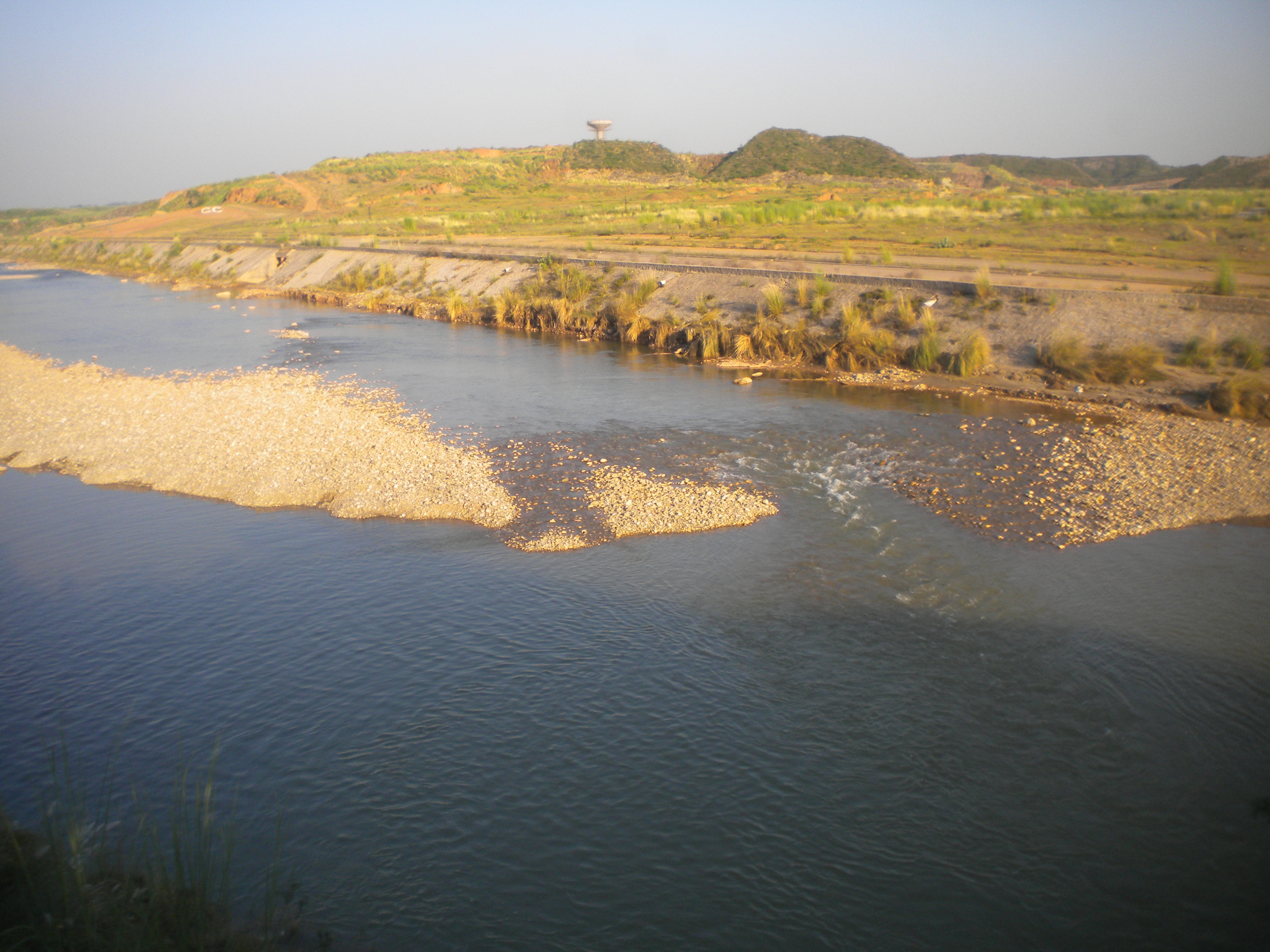
