= Sohal Khalsa =

- Village
- Location in Punjab, India Sohal Khalsa (India)
- Coordinates: 31°11′22″N 75°18′19″E
- Country: India
- State: Punjab
- District: Jalandhar
- Tehsil: Shahkot

Government
  - Type: Panchayat raj
  - Body: Gram panchayat

Area
  - Total: 133 ha (330 acres)

Population (2011)
  - Total: 568; 289/279 ♂/♀
  - Scheduled Castes: 237; 126/111 ♂/♀
  - Total Households: 116

Languages
  - Official: Punjabi
- Time zone: UTC+5:30 (IST)
- PIN: 144702
- Telephone: 01821
- ISO 3166 code: IN-PB
- Website: jalandhar.gov.in

Sohal Khalsa is a village in Shahkot in Jalandhar district of Punjab State, India. It is located 14 kilometres (8.7 mi) from sub district headquarter and 35 kilometres (22 mi) from district headquarter. The village is administrated by Sarpanch an elected representative of the village.

== Demography ==
As of 2011, the village has a total number of 116 houses and a population of 568 of which 289 are males while 279 are females. According to the 2011 Census of India, out of the total population of the village 237 people are from Schedule Caste and the village does not have any Schedule Tribe population so far.

== See also ==
- List of villages in India
