= Rawal Lake =

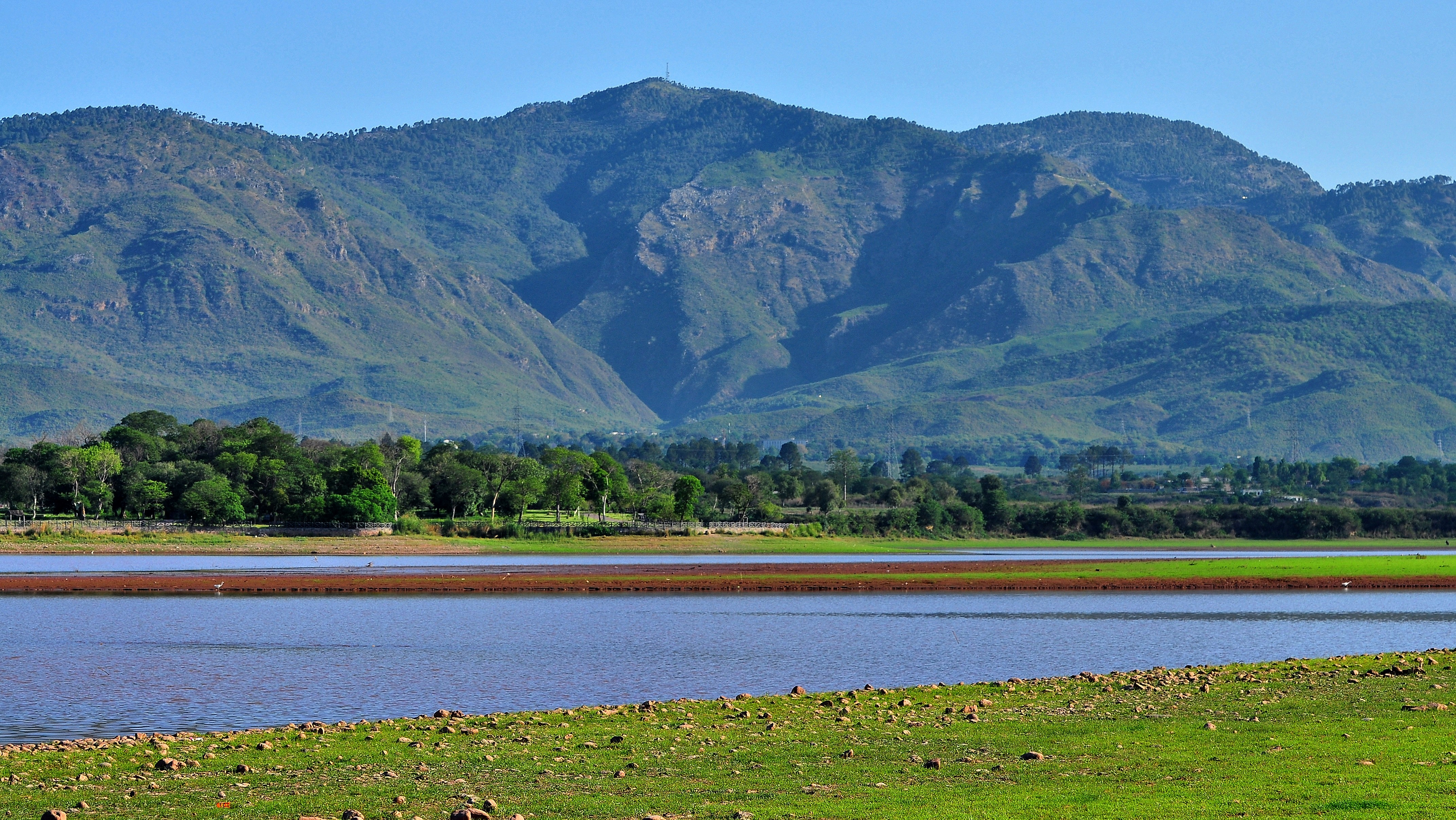
- Interactive map of Rawal Lake
- Location: Islamabad Capital Territory
- Coordinates: 33°42′N 73°07′E
- Type: reservoir
- Primary inflows: Korang River
- Catchment area: 106.25 sq mi (275.2 km^{2})
- Basin countries: Pakistan
- Surface area: 8.8 km^{2} (3.4 sq mi)
- Max. depth: 102 m (335 ft)
- Surface elevation: 527 m (1,729 ft)
- Settlements: Bani Gala

The Rawal Lake (Punjabi/Urdu: جھیل راول, romanized: Jhīl Rāwal) of northwestern Punjab in Pakistan is an artificial reservoir that provides the water needs for the cities of Rawalpindi and Islamabad. The facility is maintained by Punjab Irrigation Department. Almost 70% of the catchment area of the lake is located in Murree while 30% is located in Islamabad Capital Territory (ICT).The fishing contracts for the lake are awarded by the Islamabad Capital Territory Administration. Korang River along with some other small streams coming from Margalla Hills have been set to form this artificial lake which covers an area of 8.8 km^{2} (3.4 sq mi). Korang River is the outlet stream of Rawal Dam. Rawal Lake is located within an isolated section of the Village Malpur, Bani Gala and Margalla Hills National Park. Rawal Lake is contaminated with sewage nowadays from 2024. The dam has played a critical role in meeting water needs of the population, irrigating farmlands, flood control, and serving as natural habitat for various species of birds, fish, and other aquatic life.

== History ==
History of the dam can be traced back to early 20th century when British Government intended to construct a dam across the Korang River to meet the water demand of Rawalpindi which was considered as one of the largest cities in the region. Later on, in 1958 Government of Pakistan conducted a feasibility study for construction of dam and after due consultations project for construction of the Rawal Dam was awarded to an Italian firm namely Salini Impregilo. The dam was inaugurated by Ayub Khan in 1962 and it served as a major infrastructure progress.

== Recreation ==
The area around the lake has been planted with flowering trees and laid out with gardens, picnic spots, and secluded paths. The terraced garden and the lake are used for picnics, fishing, and boating. The highest point in the garden offers a panoramic view of the lake, Margalla and Murree hills, Rawalpindi, and Islamabad.

Boating, sailing, water skating, and diving facilities are organized by private clubs.

To the west of the lake is the Islamabad Club. The Islamabad Club is a government-organized institution that provides various sporting facilities.

== Fauna ==
=== Wildlife ===
The reservoir is of considerable importance for wintering waterfowl, especially Anas platyrhynchos.

Here the resident mammals include the Red fox, Indian pangolin, Indian crested porcupine, jungle cat, Persian jackal, Central Asian boar and yellow-throated marten, reptiles include Indian Cobra and Russell's Viper. The majority of Birds of Islamabad are found here.

=== Fishery ===
There are 15 fish species belonging to 11 genera that are present in Rawal Lake. The fish species in Rawal Lake and its tributaries include: Doula (Channa channa), Rahu (Labeorohita), Thaila (Catla catla), Mori (Cirrhinus mrigala), Carp fish (Cyprinus carpio) and Talapia (Tilapia mossambica).

== Features of Rawal Lake ==
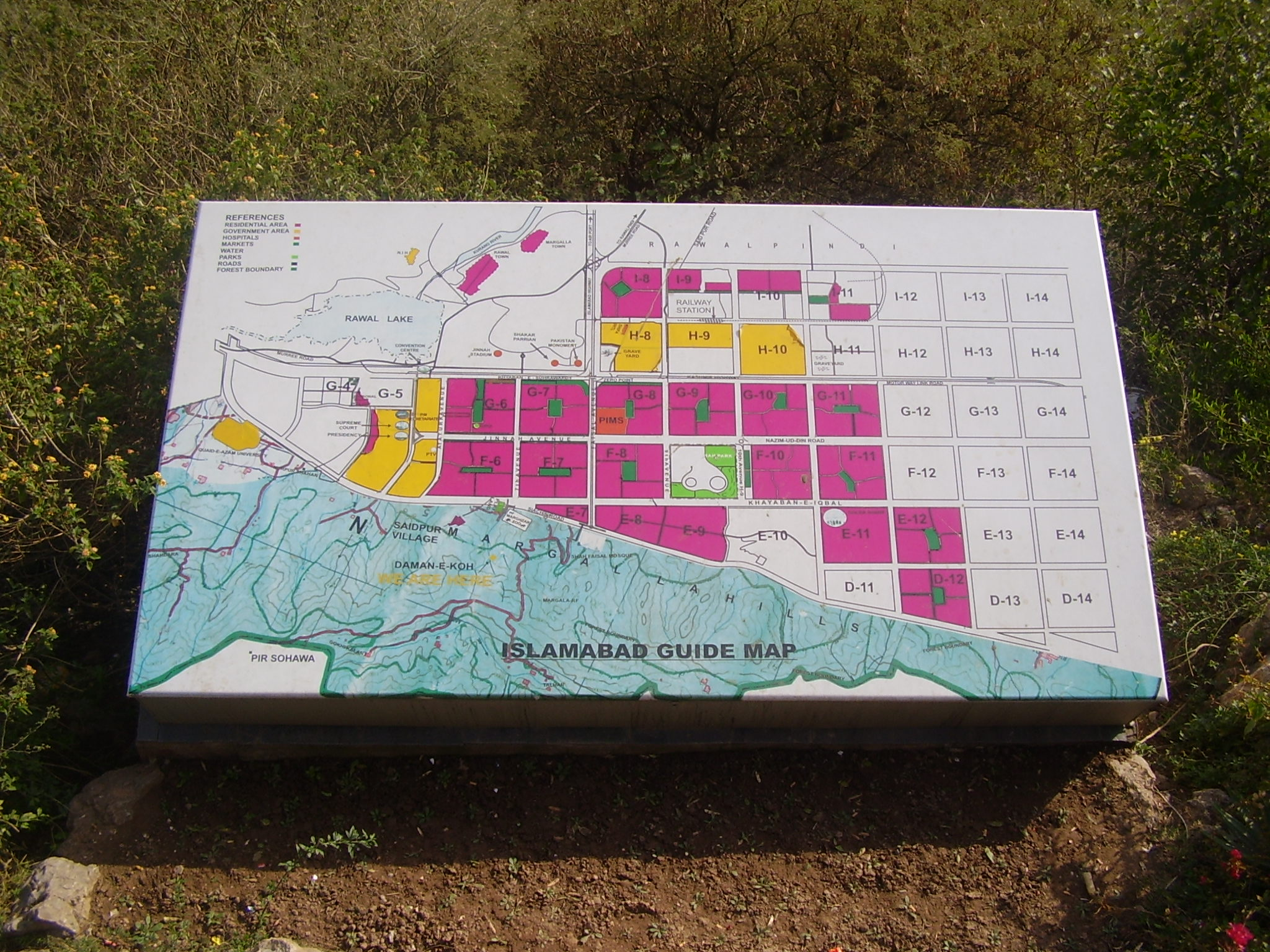

- Location: Islamabad Park Area
- Longitude: 73° 7' E
- Latitude: 33° 41' N
- Catchments Area: 106.25 square miles (275 km^{2})

=== Features of Rawal Lake dam ===
- Type of dam: partly arched gravity dam (stone-masonry)
- Crest level: 1,752 ft (534 m)
- Crest length: 700 ft (210 m)
- Maximum height: 133.5 ft (40.7 m)

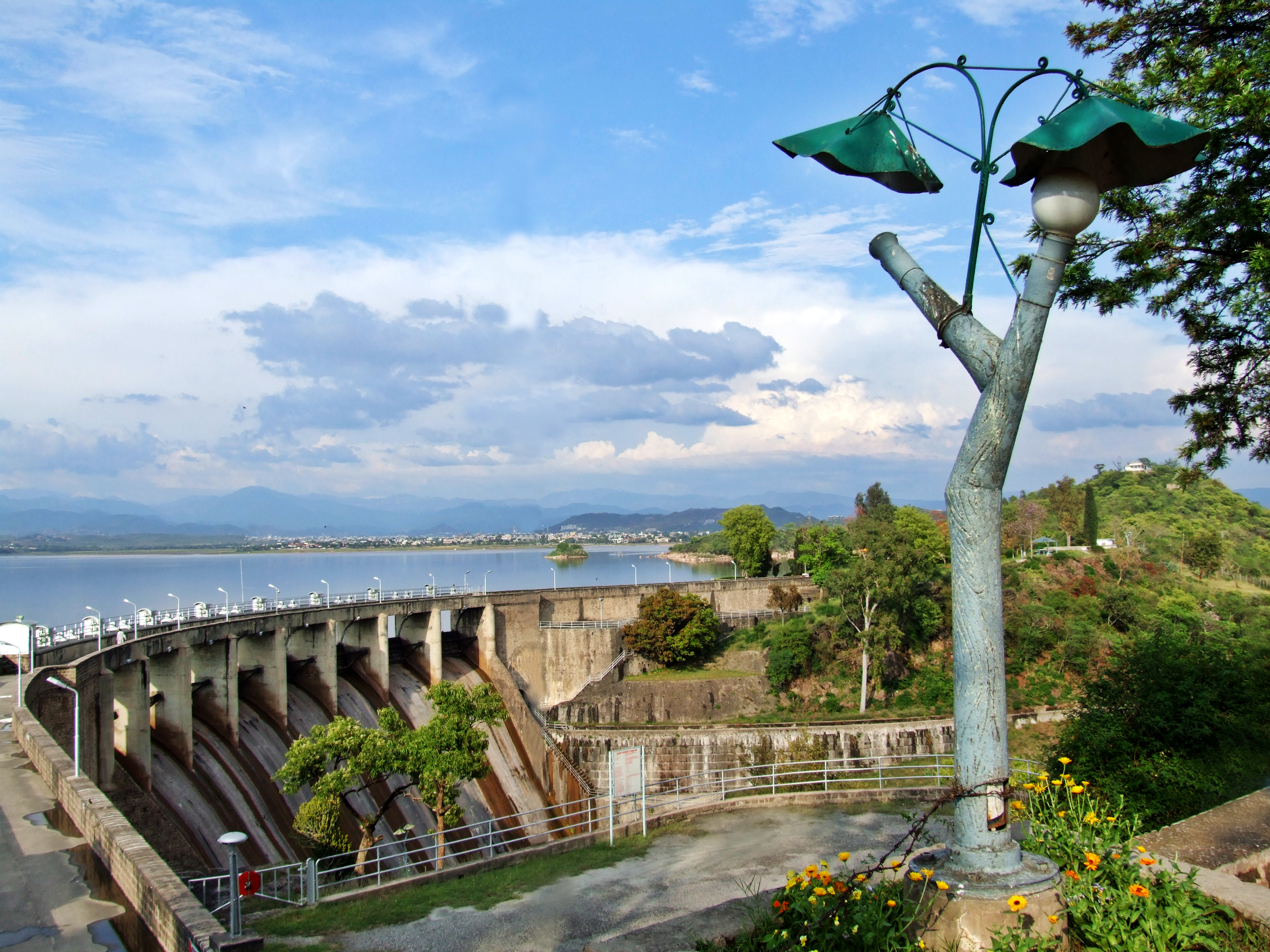
View of Rawal Dam from Old picnic point

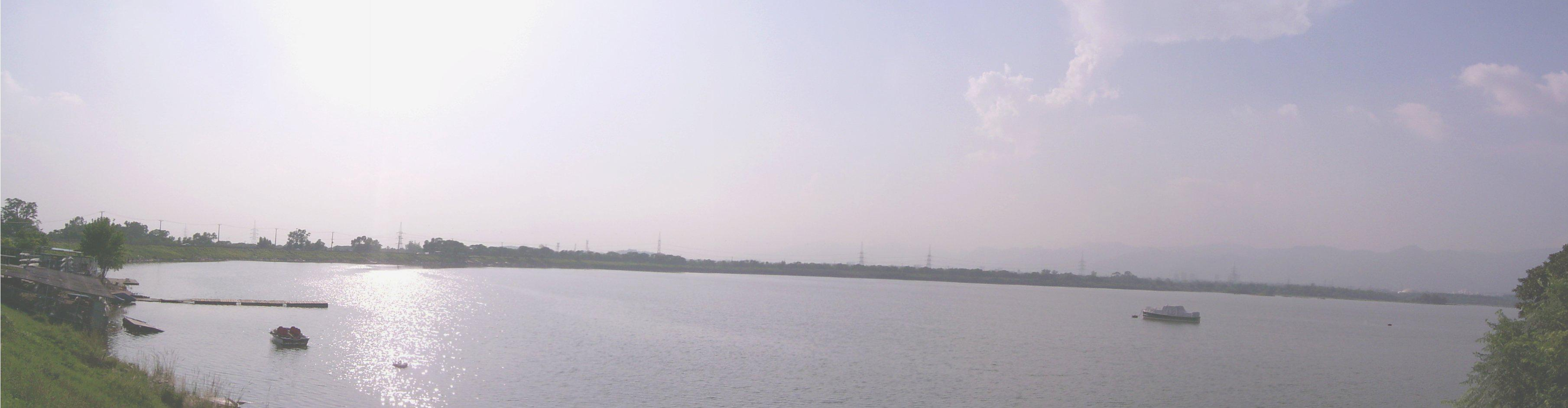
The Rawal Dam: lake view

Sun rises at Rawal Dam Lake View Park

==== Saddle ====
- Length 6,991 ft (2,131 m)
- Height 24 ft (7.3 m)

==== Spillway ====
- Type: Ogee gated structure
- Discharge Capacity: 82000 ft^{3}/s (2,300 m^{3}/s)

==== Reservoir ====
- Area: 3 square miles (7.8 km^{2})
- Maximum depth: 102 feet (31 m)
- Live storage: 37,500 acre-feet (46,300,000 m^{3})
- Dead storage: 4,500 acre-feet (5,600,000 m^{3})
- Gross capacity: 42,000 acre-feet (52,000,000 m^{3})

==== Canals ====
- Left bank canal (Shahana Disty): length 5 miles (8.0 km)
  - Capacity: 40 ft^{3}/s (1.1 m^{3}/s)
    - Purpose: Irrigation
- Right bank canal (Ojri Disty): length 1.5 miles (2.4 km)
  - Capacity: 70 ft^{3}/s (2.0 m^{3}/s)
    - Purpose: Drinking water supply to Rawalpindi

==== Drinking water supply ====
- Rawalpindi: 25.00 million US gallons per day (94,600 m^{3}/d)

==== Command area ====
- Agriculture: 500 acres (2.0 km^{2})

== See also ==
- Birds of Islamabad
- Rawal Lake View Park
- Simly Dam
