= Sihala =

Sihala سہالہ
- Union Council
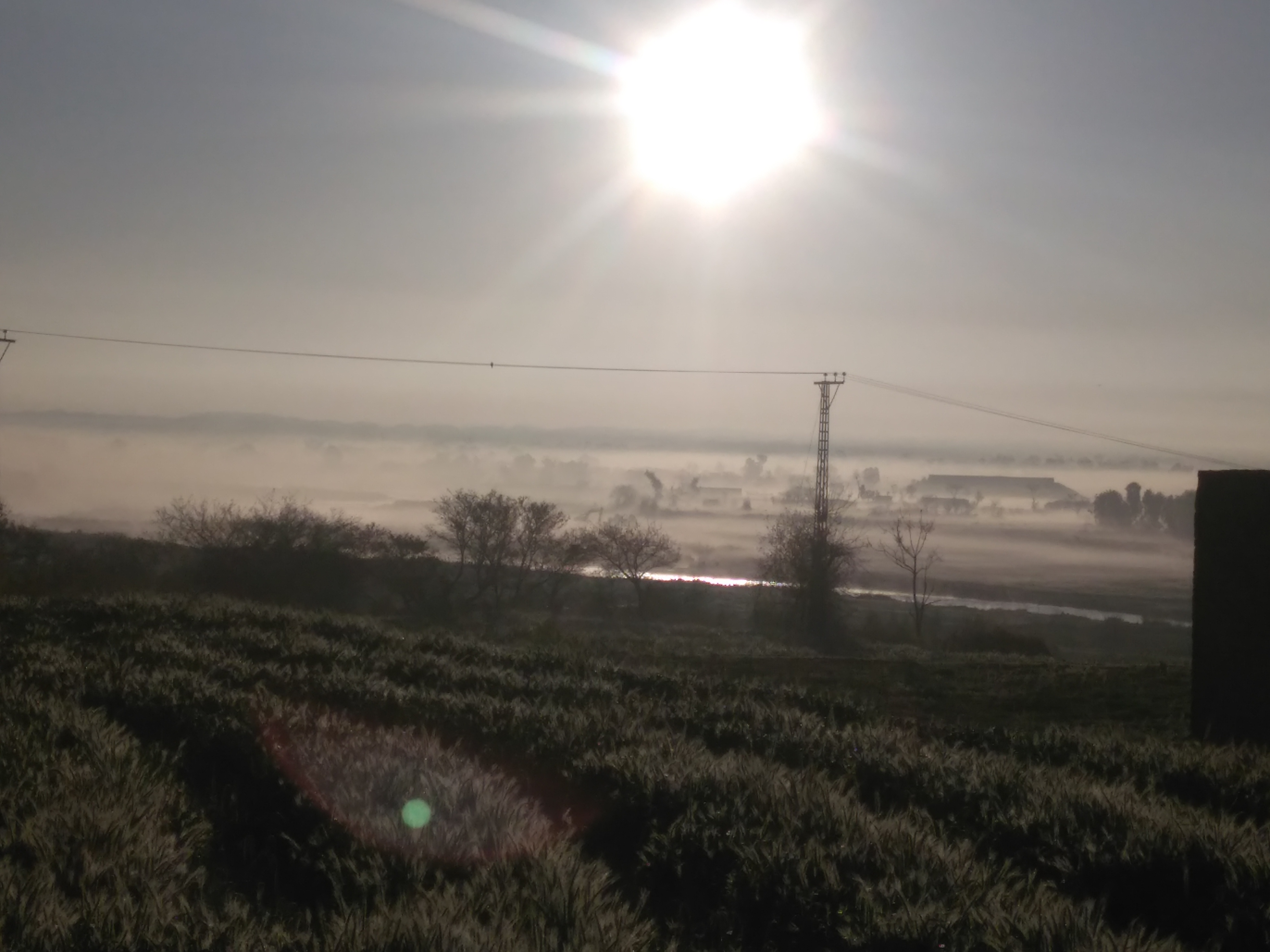

- Location in Islamabad Capital Territory Location in Pakistan
- Coordinates: 33.15°N 73.22°E
- Country: Pakistan
- Territory: Islamabad
- Elevation: 457 m (1,499 ft)
- Time zone: UTC+5 (PST)
- Postal code: 45750

Sihala is a town and union council located in Islamabad Capital Territory, Pakistan, with a population of just over 25,000. It is geographically situated on Kahuta Road and Islamabad Expressway.

Sihala connects Rawalpindi, Punjab to Azad Kashmir via Kahuta Road. It is the location of the largest police training college in Pakistan, a railway station, an animal slaughterhouse a Pakistan State Oil depot, a Military Engineering Service supply center, and the Capital University of Science & Technology.
