= Chak Shahzad =

- Union council
- Location within Pakistan
- Coordinates: 33.662°N 73.143°E
- Country: Pakistan
- Province: Islamabad Capital Territory
- Time zone: UTC+5 (PST)

Chak Shahzad (Urdu: چک شہزاد), is a modern suburb situated in the Islamabad Capital Territory of Pakistan.

Historically, the suburb was home to Malik, Chowdhury, Sheikh and Raja tribesmen, but recently has seen a growth in farmhouses of the rich and wealthy from nearby Islamabad, including that of federal minister Muhammad Talha Mahmood, Pervez Musharraf, Makhdoom Ameen Faheem, Prof. Zafar Chawdhery and Dr Tariq Fazal Chaudhry. The ex-cricketer and political leader Imran Khan also lives nearby in Bani Gala. The journalist Javed Chaudhry lives in Shahzad town which is adjacent to Chak Shahzad.

== Location ==
It is neighboring to Bani Gala, Kuri, and Taramri. The private housing society of Malik Riaz, Bahria Enclave Islamabad, is 4 km away from Chak Shahzad. Zero Point Interchange is 12 km away.

== Services and facilities ==
=== Educational ===
==== Schools and colleges ====
- Islamabad Model College For Boys (F.A) Chak Shahzad
- PakTurk Maarif International School
- Allied School Capital Campus Islamabad
- Roots Millennium Schools Oxbridge Campus

==== Specialisation institutions ====
- Health Services Academy (HSA)
- Institute of Health & Management Sciences

==== Universities ====
- COMSATS University Islamabad Campus
- Iqra University Chak Shahzad Campus
- King Hamad University of Nursing and Associated Medical Sciences
- Abasyn University Islamabad Campus
- National Textile Institute

=== Health ===
- National Institute of Health (NIH)
- Federal General Hospital Chak Shahzad
- Regional Blood Centre Islamabad
- Medikay Cardiac Centre

=== Research ===
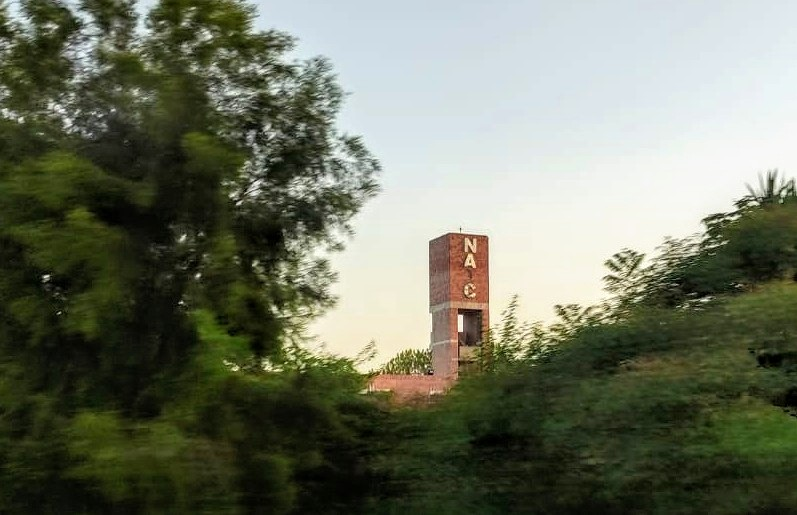
NARC, Islamabad

- National Agricultural Research Centre (NARC)
- Geoscience Advance Research Laboratories (GARL)

== See also ==
- Capital Development Authority
- Developments in Islamabad
- Shahzad Town
- Bani Gala
- Kuri, ICT
- Alipur Farash
