= Developments in Islamabad =

Islamabad is located in the Pothohar Plateau in the northern part of Pakistan, within the Islamabad Capital Territory. It is a well-organized city divided into different sectors and zones. It was ranked as a Gamma + world city in 2020. The city is home to Pakistan Monument, which is built on top of a hill in Shakarparian, and the Faisal Mosque, one of the largest mosques in Asia and the sixth largest mosque as per area in the world. The Capital Development Authority is tasked with developing the city and its facilities.

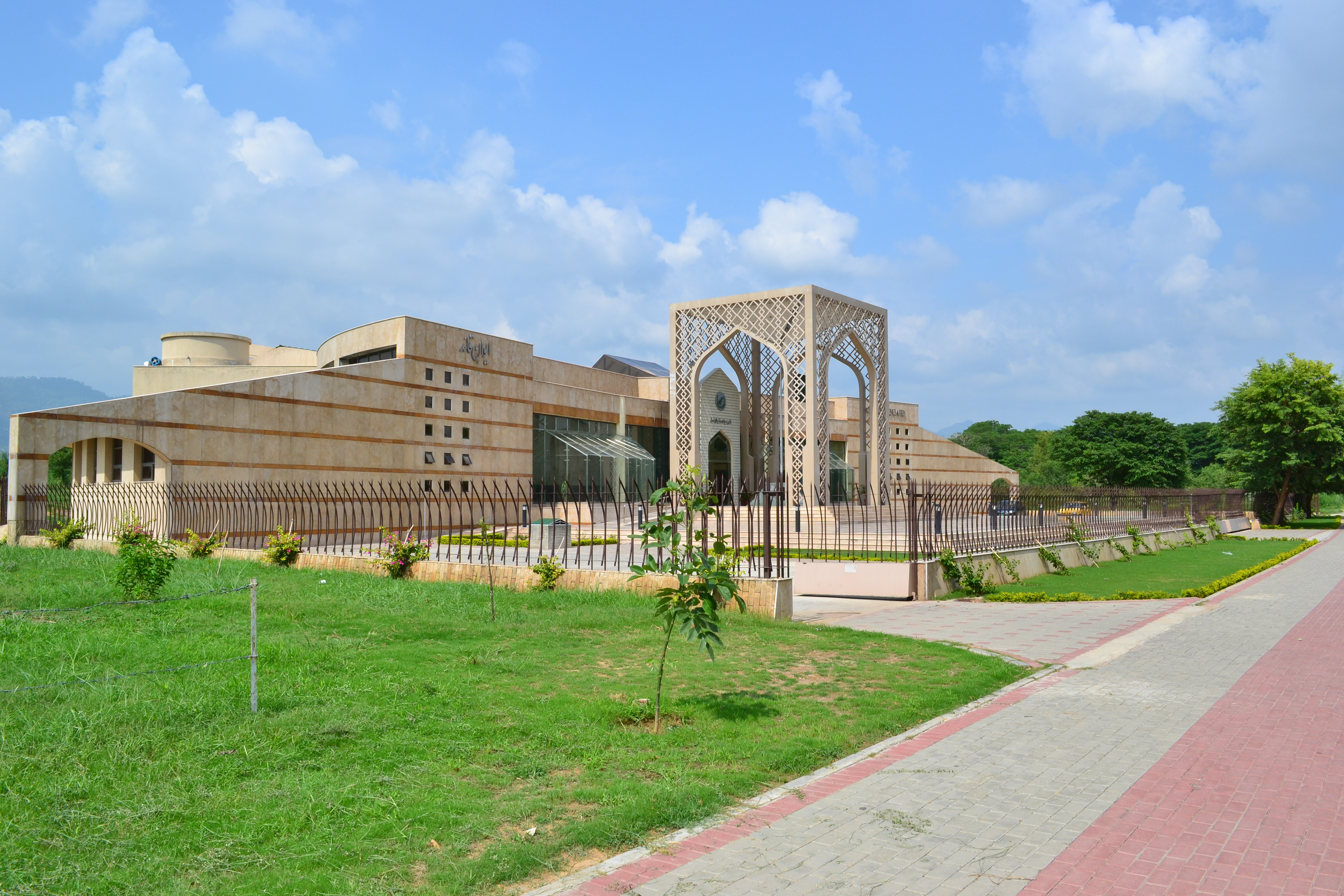
Aiwan-e-Quaid, Fatima Jinnah Park

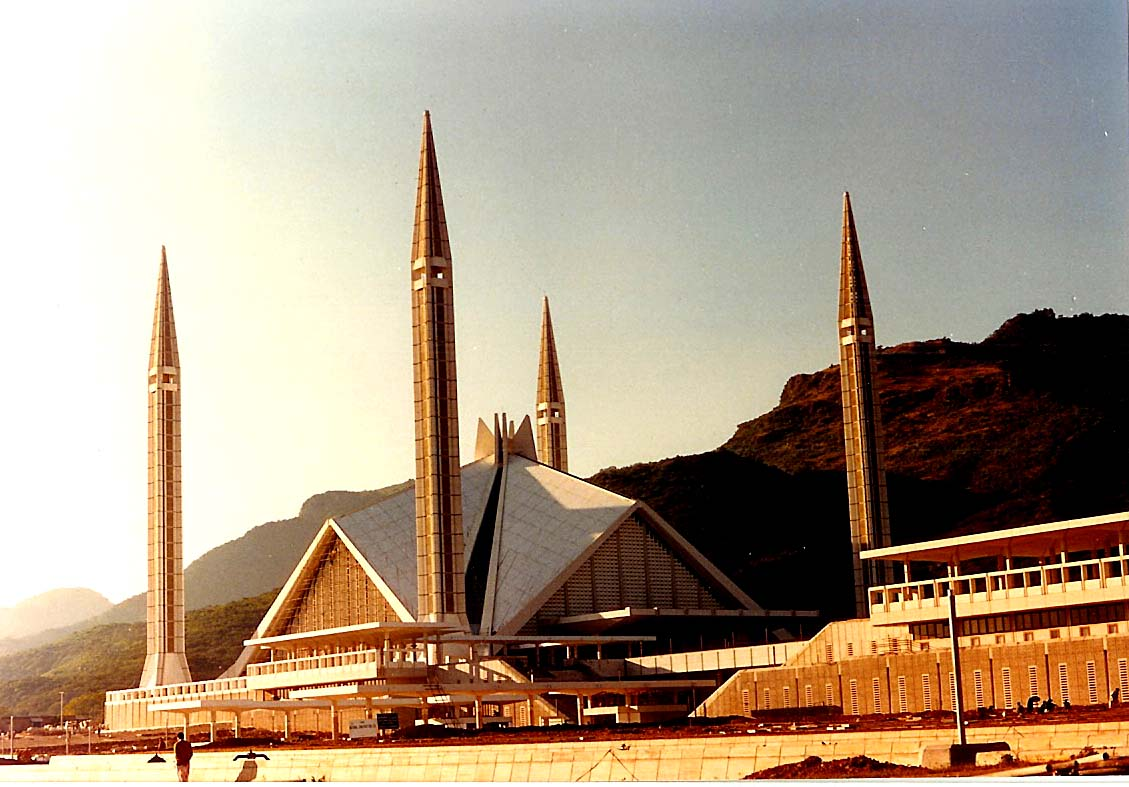
Faisal Mosque, Islamabad

Islamabad has seen large-scale development and infrastructure projects in the 21st century. In 2023, the most prominent projects are;

- Margalla Avenue
- 11th Avenue
- 10th Avenue
- Bhara Kahu Bypass
- IJP Road reconstruction
- Islamabad Expressway Expansion
- Blue Area Expansion

== Completed developments ==
=== Margalla Avenue ===
The 11 km Margalla Avenue runs along the foothills of Margalla Hills and connects Sector B-17 (Sangjani on G.T. Road) to Sector D-12 and E-11 (11th Avenue and Khayaban-e-Iqbal Road). It is a six-lane road, 15m wide on each side. The project was completed at a cost of Rs1.8 billion.

Capital Development Authority prepared PC-I of the project in 2008 with a spirit to protect the green image of the Margalla Hills National Park. Construction started in 2021 and the road was opened for public in 2023. It facilitates the travelers heading towards Islamabad from the northern parts of the country to reach the heart of the city within 10 minutes. It also facilitates those who have to commute daily from areas like Taxila, Wah Cantt, Hasan Abdal, Haripur to various parts of the federal capital.

Margalla Avenue will further be extended 3.5 km to the M-1 motorway by the end of 2024.

=== Bhara Kahu Bypass ===
Work on Bhara Kahu bypass started in late 2022 and is scheduled to be completed in August 2023. It had to be built due to ever increasing traffic and congestion. People who wanted to go towards Murree and its surrounding areas for tourism faced hours of traffic jams. Work is undergoing 24/7 at fast pace. There was an incident that a girder fell as it was unstable and 2 people lost their lives. Safety protocols were increased on site after this incident. The project completed on 14 August 2023.

=== IJP Road Reconstruction ===
The 10 km long four-lane Inter-Junction Principal Road was converted to a signal free six-lane road having two bridges (9th Avenue and Faqir Aipi Road) and one interchange (10th Avenue).

This road divides Rawalpindi and Islamabad and is mostly used by heavy vehicles. Project's cost was 4.9 Billion PKR. Work started in mid 2021, and completed in April 2023.

=== New Islamabad International Airport ===
The Islamabad International Airport was completed in 2018. It replaced the former Benazir Bhutto International Airport, which was incorporated into the Noor Khan Air Base. The new airport is located in Fateh Jang, which is 25 km west of the city. Construction of the airport project began in April 2007 and completed in May 2018.

=== Metro Bus Rapid Transit System (BRTS) ===
The Red Line of Rawalpindi-Islamabad Metrobus is a 22.5 km (14.0 mi) BRT line that serves the twin cities of Rawalpindi and Islamabad in Pakistan. It uses dedicated bus lanes for all of its route covering 24 bus stations. It was inaugurated on 4 June 2015 by Prime Minister Nawaz Sharif becoming the second fully functional BRT service in Pakistan after the BRTS in Lahore. Orange Line was inaugurated in 2021 which connects Islamabad city center to Islamabad Airport. Blue and Green Lines were started in 2022 on dedicated routes by Shehbaz Sharif.

=== Islamabad Expressway ===
Islamabad Expressway or Faisal Avenue (named after Saudi King Faisal), is one of the main highways of Islamabad, Pakistan that connects it to Rawalpindi. It stretches from Faisal Mosque (on northern end) to Rawat (on southern end) linking to GT Road with a length of about 28 kilometers. It initially had 3 lanes on each side but was later expanded to 5 lanes on each side in 2015 due to ever increasing traffic. It has many interchanges, most important ones being Jinnah Avenue, Zero Point Interchange and Faizabad Interchange, Khanna Bridge, Old Airport, Gulberg, DHA, T-Chowk. The expressway was further widened from Gulberg to Korang in 2023. Expansion from Korang to T-Chowk will complete by the end of 2024.

=== Blue Line Metro Bus ===
The residents have access to a blue line metro bus that operates on the Islamabad Expressway from Gulberg Interchange to PIMS Metro Bus Station.

=== Peshawar Mor Interchange ===
Peshawar Mor is the intersection between 9th Avenue and Kashmir Highway. A cloverleaf interchange on this intersection was made in 2016 to ease traffic congestion and reduce waiting times due to traffic signals. This interchange also has a metrobus station underground. Passport Office and Sunday Market are nearby.

=== Zero Point Interchange ===
The Zero Point Interchange is the cluster of flyovers and roads adjacent to Zero Point on one side and Islamabad Highway on the other side. It was built by Maqbool Associates at a cost of Pak.Rs 2.33 billion. The construction work was started in 2007 and was completed in December 2010. The zero point interchange was constructed in two phases. Phase 1 included the three major loops of the interchange. In Phase 2, two more loops which will connect Khayaban-e-Suhrawardy and Shakarparian were constructed.

=== The Centaurus ===
The Centaurus is a mixed-use residential, commercial, and business purpose complex located in Blue Area of Islamabad. The complex is designed by WS Atkins PLC, whose portfolio includes the Burj Al Arab and Jumeirah Beach Hotel in Dubai, and the Bahrain World Trade Center in Bahrain. It is a project of the Pak Gulf Construction (Pvt) Ltd (PGCL) in Islamabad.

=== Islamabad Stock Exchange Towers ===
The ISE Towers are a recently completed office building in Islamabad. Islamabad Stock Exchange or ISE was the youngest of the three stock exchanges of Pakistan and is located in the capital of Pakistan. Islamabad stock exchange (ISE) was incorporated as a guarantee-limited company on 25 October 1989 in Islamabad. ISE tower is a 22-storey building, which makes it the second highest building of Islamabad after the Telecom Tower. Area covered by the building is 52,269 m^{2} (562,620 sq ft), it consists of three levels of basements and ground plus 18 floors above.

=== Telecom Tower ===
Telecom Tower is a 113-meter-high office building built in 2009 in the Blue Area of Islamabad. It was built by Pakistan Telecommunication Trust. The building consists of 24 floors plus four basement levels and includes a parking facility for 400 cars.

=== World Trade Center ===
The World Trade Center, Islamabad project was launched in March 2007 and located in the heart of Phase-II of Defence Housing Authority, Islamabad. It is facing the G.T. Road and includes a shopping mall that has a Carrefour, along with a hotel. It opened in August 2016.

=== Other ===
- Daman-e-Koh
- Development of Fatima Jinnah Park and Lake View Park
- Renovation of Shrine of Bari Imam
- Development of Saidpur Village
- Development of Judicial & Administration Complex, Sector G-10
- Renovation of Food Street at Melody Market
- Food Mall at Blue Area
- Development of Malpur Village
- Development of Pak-China Friendship Centre
- Development of Charah Dam

== Smart city and digital infrastructure ==
The Islamabad Safe City Project was approved in 2011 and inaugurated in June 2016 at an estimated cost of Rs 12.6 billion (approximately US$125 million). The system includes a network of over 1,500 surveillance cameras, automated number plate recognition (ANPR), and a centralized command and control center designed to monitor major highways and entry points.

== Environmental planning and green infrastructure ==
Islamabad's original master plan designated significant portions of the city, including the Margalla Hills National Park and Fatima Jinnah Park, as protected green spaces. In recent years, urban development has faced scrutiny regarding the reduction of these areas. To address infrastructure demands, projects such as the Asian Development Bank's Sustainable and Green Infrastructure Project have been initiated to support environmentally compliant public facilities in the capital.

== Developments under construction ==
=== Rawalpindi Ring Road ===
Rawalpindi Ring Road is a 38.3 km Ring Road on which construction started in 2024. It will start from Banth on N-5 and terminate on Thalian on M-2. It will have five interchanges. Heavy vehicles would be bound to use the Ring Road hence reducing traffic on the existing Peshawar Road. This is a greater extension of the under construction Sialkot-Rawalpindi Motorway of Pakistan. Funds were released in March 2023.

Due to the announcement of a major redesign of the Thalian Interchange connecting to Rawalpindi Ring Road, the budget is now projected to climb back up to Rs 39 to 40 billion.

Chief Minister of Punjab, Maryam Nawaz, has set a target of December 2025 for the project's completion.

There is also a proposal to establish economic zones along both sides of the Ring Road, but that is still in pending approval. If approved, it may delay the final completion date of the project.

As of May 2025, the project is 50% complete and the construction is in progress.

=== 11th Avenue ===
11th Avenue had to be built because people coming to Islamabad via Margalla Avenue would have nowhere to go but enter residential sectors of D-12 and E-11. This is because land near Margalla Hills belongs to Pakistan Army and Margalla Avenue could not be extended up to Faisal Mosque. Existing roads surrounding the sectors were of 2 lanes only. A six-lane signal free Avenue starting from E-11 is being built with a major interchange at Kashmir road and IJP road. Project would complete by late-2024. 11th Avenue was renamed "Iran Avenue" in May 2024.

=== 10th Avenue ===
Construction on 10th Avenue started in 2022 and would have been completed by 2024, but due to the slow pace of construction, the completion date has been shifted to the end of 2025. It would connect the IJP Road to Islamabad Sector E-10 and would have an interchange at the intersection of the Kashmir Highway. It would be 6-lane 8 km long avenue with 3-lane service roads on both sides. This project would heavily improve the road connectivity between Rawalpindi and Islamabad, as well as reducing traffic congestion in the twin cities. Work on the 10th Avenue is 40% complete as of April 2025, if faced further delays, would take longer to reach its completion.

=== Blue Area Extension ===
Blue Area is the largest commercial area in Islamabad on both sides of the Jinnah Avenue. Extension of Blue Area is underway with many high-rise buildings under construction between sectors G-8 and F-8, G-9 and F-9 Park.

=== Canyon Views (Emaar) ===
Canyon Views by real-estate developer Emaar was launched in May 2006. Located in DHA Phase-5, it offers a luxurious villa-community spanning over an area of 6 km^{2}.

This mixed-use development (residential, commercial, leisure, and retail) consists of three projects valued at Rs. 145 billion (US$2.4 billion). The Canyon views upon completion will include swimming pools, gymnasium, sports amenities, running track, tennis court, open spaces for picnics and barbecues, retail outlets, restaurants, schools, and a mosque.

The views will include 50 communities in it, and when fully completed it will have homes for 9,000 families. Phase 1 of the project has been completed and sold out while Phase 2 is still under construction.

=== One Constitution Avenue ===
One Constitution Avenue project is located at the southern end of the Constitution Avenue on a 55,000 m^{2} (590,000 sq ft) and is connected to two major roads of the city (Srinagar Highway to the northwest and Murree Road to the southwest).

The development consists of a 45-story 5-star hotel (Grand Hyatt), Serviced apartments tower (One CASA), Two 20-storied residential towers (Residences) and a shopping mall (Mall One). Construction of the 20 story residential twin towers is complete. Twin towers are linked together by means of a bridge at the 20th floor, aligned with the axis of the Constitution Avenue. Other towers of the project are under construction. Other features of the project include retail and food courts, banquet and multistory carpark.

=== Kingdom Valley Islamabad ===
Kingdom Valley is a housing society developed & designed by Kingdom group developers. Smart city feature housing project offers Residential & commercial plots & categorized by different General & Executive Blocks. This Housing Society comes under the Naya Pakistan Housing Program (NPHP). There are no second thoughts about the fact that this housing society project has been providing a lot more than people's expectations.

=== Blue World City Islamabad ===
Blue World City is a premium housing society developed by the Blue Group of Companies (BGC). Located near Chakri interchange and M2 Motorway Islamabad, it is Pakistan's first tourist city and expected to become the most advanced housing society in Pakistan. Blue World City is divided into many blocks, districts, and Enclaves including General Block, Water Front District, Legends Enclave, Awami Block, Overseas Block, Hollywood Block, and Sports Valley Block.

Among all the blocks and Enclaves, the Legends Enclave is famous for offering top-notch sports and fitness facilities including open-air gyms, cricket, football & hockey grounds, sports complex, cycling track, swimming pools, and other sports facilities. The other blocks of Blue World City have their unique features and are also quite popular among the investors.

== Proposed and Future developments ==
=== Lai Expressway ===
Lai Expressway would be built along the Lai Nullah in Rawalpindi. This 17 km 3-lane expressway is in planning stages since 2015. This project would improve connectivity within different areas of Rawalpindi. Encroachments will have to be removed on both sides of the river. Work might commence in 2023 and complete by 2025. It would be a 25 km 3 lane expressway with 3 interchanges.

=== Tourism Expressway ===
Kohsar Tourism Expressway project is a 123 km planned expressway which will connect Rawalpindi to Murree via Kallar Syedan, Kotli Sattiyan, and Kahuta.

Project would cost PKR 4.5 billion and would be constructed in two years. The expressway will boost tourism and help open up massive investment and commercial opportunities for the region's local and international tourist industries.

== Housing schemes ==
Islamabad Capital Territory is subdivided into five zones, and the development work is in progress for the following residential and commercial projects;

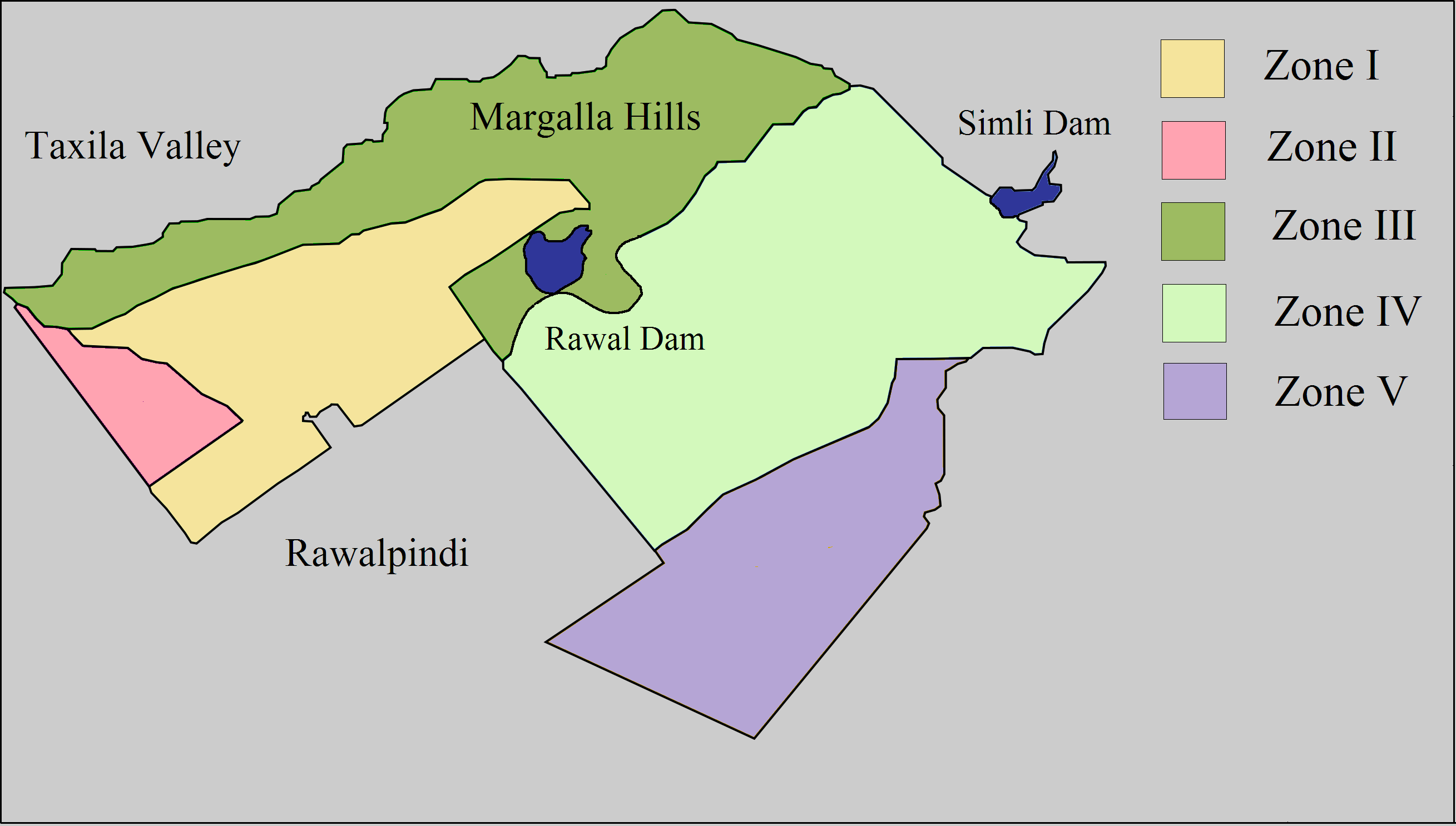
Zone-wise map of Islamabad Capital Territory

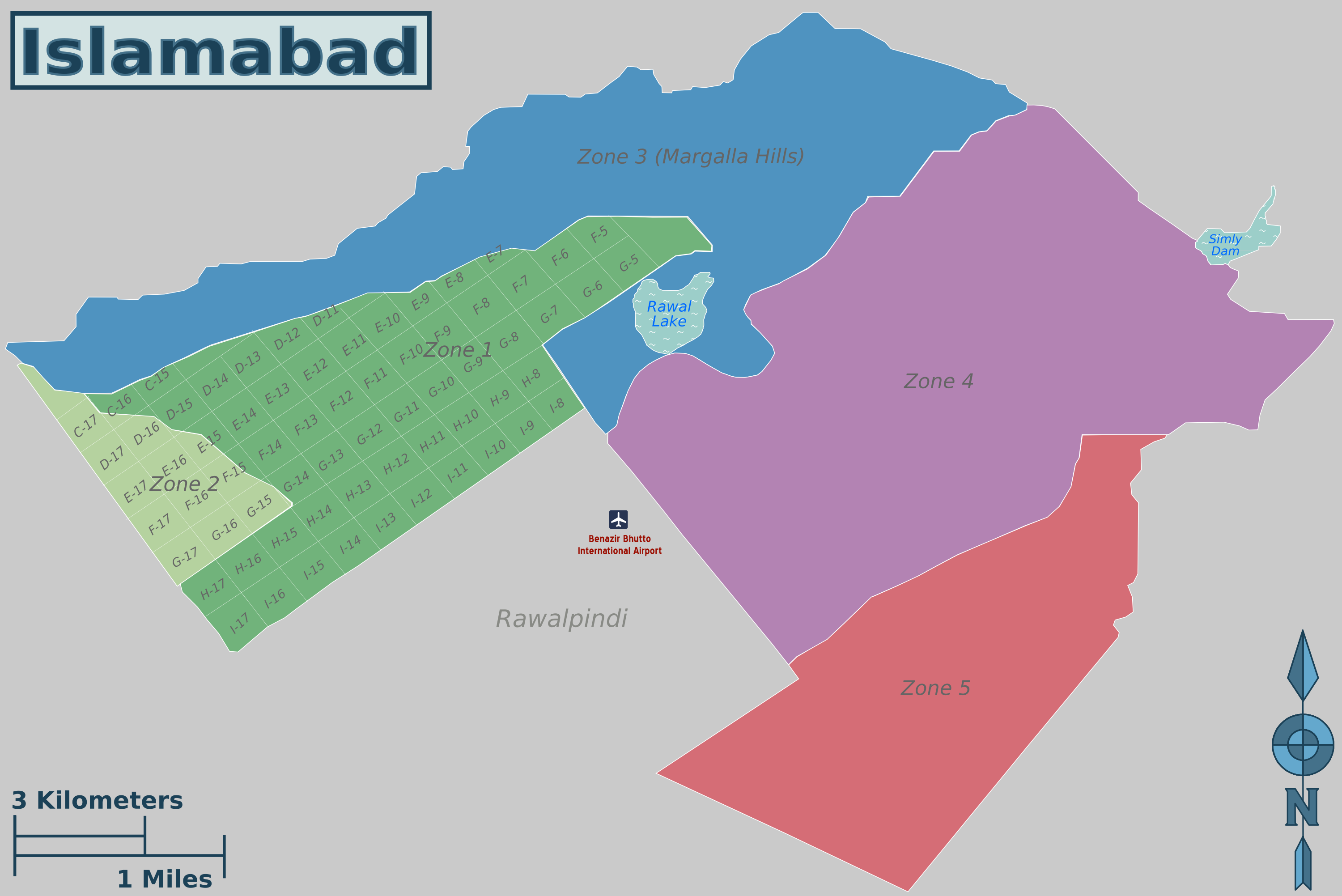
The five zones and sectors of Islamabad

=== Zone I ===
- Sector C-15 (Under construction, 30% completed)
- Sector C-16
- Sector C-17
- Sector D-11
- Sector D-12 (Fully developed)
- Sector D-13
- Sector D-14
- Sector D-15
- Sector D-16
- Sector D-17 (Under construction, 40% completed)
- Sector D-18 (Under construction, 30% completed)
- Sector E-7 (Fully developed)
- Sector E-8 (Fully developed)
- Sector E-9 (Fully developed)
- Sector E-10 (Margalla Hills)
- Sector E-11 (Fully developed)
- Sector E-12 (Under construction, 50% completed))
- Sector E-13
- Sector E-14
- Sector E-15
- Sector E-16 (Under construction)
- Sector E-17 (Under construction)
- Sector E-18 (Under construction)
- Sector F-5 (Fully developed)
- Sector F-6 (Fully developed)
- Sector F-7 (Fully developed)
- Sector F-8 (Fully developed)
- Sector F-9 (Fatima Jinnah Park)
- Sector F-10 (Fully developed)
- Sector F-11 (Fully developed)
- Sector F-12
- Sector F-13
- Sector F-14
- Sector F-15 (Fully developed)
- Sector F-16
- Sector F-17 (Fully developed)
- Sector F-18 (Fully developed)
- Sector G-5 (Fully developed)
- Sector G-6 (Fully developed)
- Sector G-7 (Fully developed)
- Sector G-8 (Fully developed)
- Sector G-9 (Fully developed)
- Sector G-10 (Fully developed)
- Sector G-11 (Fully developed)
- Sector G-12
- Sector G-13 (Fully developed)
- Sector G-14 (Fully developed)
- Sector G-15 (Fully developed)
- Sector G-16 (Under construction, 50% completed)
- Sector G-17 (Under construction)
- Sector H-8 (Fully developed, Dedicated for universities)
- Sector H-9 (Fully developed, Dedicated for universities)
- Sector H-10 (Fully developed, Dedicated for universities)
- Sector H-11 (Fully developed, Dedicated for universities)
- Sector H-12 (Fully developed, Dedicated for universities)
- Sector H-13
- Sector H-14
- Sector H-15
- Sector H-16
- Sector H-17 (Under construction, 40% completed)
- Sector H-18, EIGHTEEN project being developed by an Egyptian Real Estate Group.
- Sector I-8 (Fully developed)
- Sector I-9 (Fully developed)
- Sector I-10 (Fully developed)
- Sector I-11 (Fully developed)
- Sector I-12 (Under construction, 80% completed)
- Sector I-13
- Sector I-14 (Fully developed)
- Sector I-15 (Under construction, 50% completed)
- Sector I-16 (Under construction, 40% completed)
- Sector I-17
- Sector I-18

=== Zone-II ===
- Sector E-15,
- Sector F-15, Jammu and Kashmir Cooperative Housing Society
- Sector G-15, Jammu and Kashmir Cooperative Housing Society
- Sector D-16, Engineers Housing Scheme
- Sector E-16, Cabinet Division Housing Society && Roshan Pakistan (RP) Housing Society
- Sector F-16, Jammu and Kashmir Cooperative Housing Society
- Sector G-16, Ministry of Interior Employees Co-operative Housing Society
- Sector G-17, Supreme Court Employees Cooperative Housing Society
- Sector A-17, Multi Professional Cooperative Housing Society (MPCHS) - Multi Gardens
- Sector B-17, Multi Professional Cooperative Housing Society (MPCHS) - Multi Gardens
- Sector C-17, New Islamabad Garden
- Sector D-17, Margalla View Housing Scheme (MVHS)
- Sector E-17, Cabinet Division Housing Society
- Sector F-17, Multi Professional Cooperative Housing Society (MPCHS) - Tele Gardens
- Sector F-18, Faisal Town
- Sector B-18, Multi Professional Cooperative Housing Society (MPCHS) - Multi Gardens
- Sector D-18, Army Welfare Trust
- Sector D-18, Engineers Cooperative Housing Societies (ECHS) Islamabad
- Sector E-18, Gulshan-e-Sehat will be fully developed in 2030

=== Zone-II Extension ===
- Islamabad Orchards, Multi Professional Cooperative Housing Society (MPCHS)

=== Zone-III ===
Consists of the Margalla Hills National Park

=== Zone-IV ===
- Park Enclave, Islamabad
- PHA Kuri Road Housing Project
- Bahria Enclave Islamabad
- Lake View Lanes, Islamabad

=== Zone-V ===
- Defence Housing Authority, Islamabad
- DHA Valley, Islamabad
- Bahria Town, Islamabad
- Naval Anchorage, Islamabad
- Gulberg, Islamabad

== Model towns ==
In 1985, Capital Development Authority declared several outlying areas of Islamabad as 'model villages' to ease the housing problem. These model villages are as follows:

- Farash Town
- Humak Town
- Margalla Town
- Rawal Town
- Shahzad Town

== See also ==
- Bahria Town
- Islamabad International Airport
- Capital Development Authority
- Emaar Properties
- InterContinental
- List of tallest buildings in Pakistan
- Tourism in Islamabad
- Benazir Bhutto International Airport

=== Zone-V ===
- Defence Housing Authority, Islamabad
- DHA Valley, Islamabad
- Bahria Town, Islamabad
- Naval Anchorage, Islamabad
- Gulberg, Islamabad
