= Margalla Avenue =

Highway in Islamabad, Pakistan

- خیابانِ مارگلہ
- Margalla Expressway
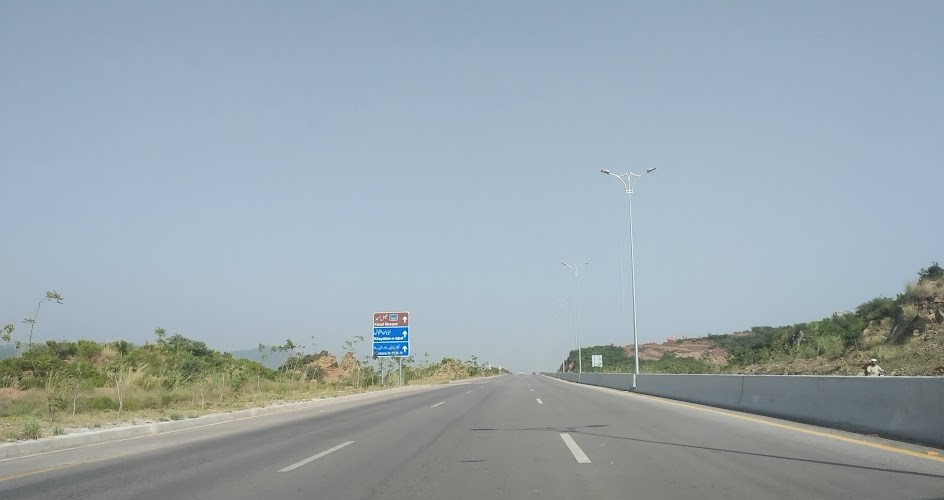
- Margalla Avenue near Shah Allah Ditta

Route information
- Maintained by Capital Development Authority
- Length: 33 km (21 mi)
- Existed: 20 June 2023–present

Major junctions
- North end: N-5 National Highway at Sangjani
- South end: E75 expressway (Pakistan) at Barakahu

Location
- Country: Pakistan

Highway system
- Roads in Pakistan

The Margalla Avenue or Margalla Expressway (Urdu: خیابانِ مارگلہ) is a 33-kilometer six-lane highway in the Margalla Hills area in the suburbs of Islamabad, Pakistan. It was planned in 1966, but work on it was stalled till 2021. The road is an alternative to the Srinagar Highway, and provides easy access of the tenth and eleventh sectors of Islamabad to the N-5 National Highway. This road is a crucial section of the larger Rawalpindi Ring Road project as it connects the town of Sangjani (on the N-5 National Highway) to the town of Barakahu (on the Murree Expressway).

The Prime Minister of Pakistan, Imran Khan laid the foundation stone of the project on 20 March 2022. The Chief Minister of Punjab, Sardar Usman Buzdar, Federal Interior Minister, Sheikh Rasheed Ahmad, and other notables were also present during the foundation stone laying ceremony of the project.

The road was inaugurated by Prime Minister Shehbaz Sharif on 20 June 2023.

== History ==
=== Approval and Construction ===
The project was planned in 2006 during the Pervez Musharraf regime as an alternative to the Srinagar Highway and the future new Islamabad Airport. The project remained pending until it regained importance during the Yusuf Raza Gillani government due to the new Islamabad International Airport. The project was finally started in 2012 with the cost of Rs. 744 million, with the completion deadline of June 2013. However, the project stalled since the Capital Development Authority (CDA) could not acquire land for the project for various reasons; for example, a century-old graveyard at Shah Allah Ditta village lay on the proposed route, and the locals of the village protested against it.

In 2014, CDA announced an alternative plane to divert the road from the northern part of Shah Allah Ditta instead of its south. Reportedly 40% of the work was completed by 2014. However, the 2.4 km-patch passing through Shah Allah Ditta graveyard hung in the balance as the village's residents refused to vacate it.

However, till 2019 only 51% of the project was completed due to conflicts between contractor and CDA. The contractor pleaded that land clearance was the responsibility of CDA, while CDA maintained the contract was cancelled before this due to some technical reasons. The court ruled in favor of the contractor and fined Rs. 170 million to CDA, which was challenged in the Islamabad High Court. In January 2020, CDA formed a committee to resolve the out of court settlement of outstanding with the contractor and find some viable solution to restart the project. Eventually, Prime Minister Imran Khan performed groundbreaking of the project on 19 April 2021.

On 20 June 2023, the road was finally inaugurated by Prime Minister Shehbaz Sharif.

In August 2023, the CDA approved the construction of a new 3.4-kilometre road connecting the recently inaugurated Margalla Avenue with M-1 motorway at an estimated cost of Rs. 5.45 billion. The project would take eight months to be completed. Another 5-kilometer road is currently being constructed to link the current eastern terminus to the Margalla road in sector E-11.

=== Renaming of 11th Avenue interchange ===
In April 2024, during the three-day official visit of Iranian President Ebrahim Raisi to Pakistan, the federal government decided to rename the newly constructed Eleventh Avenue—which connects to Margalla Avenue at Sector D-12—as "Iran Avenue". The renaming was approved by the federal cabinet via a summary from the Capital Development Authority (CDA) as a gesture of bilateral friendship. The 5.5-kilometre portion of the road from Sector D-12 to E-11 was jointly inaugurated by President Raisi and Prime Minister Shehbaz Sharif on 22 April 2024.

== Significance of the project ==
According to CDA officials, the road would shed load from the existing Srinagar Highway. It would connect existing Khayaban-i-Iqbal to Murree Road via Bari Imam. Most importantly, Phase II of Islamabad on the west of N-5 National Highway, or G.T. road, would connect to Islamabad's existing sectors. The highway would also provide alternative access to the M-1 motorway, Islamabad International Airport, and Rawalpindi Ring Road. In 2015, CDA announced that once Margalla Avenue is completed, it would be linked to E75 expressway.

In early 2020, Rawalpindi Development Authority (RDA) announced the final shape of Rs. 62 billion Rawalpindi Ring Road project. The project was approved by Chief Minister, Punjab Usman Buzdar in September 2020. The Rawalpindi Ring Road project would end at the Sangjani toll plaza, and this would provide a direct connection to all parts of Rawalpindi. The road would also connect 60 kilometers Islamabad Ring Road project.

The CDA also announced its tenth avenue project, which would link Srinagar Highway and Margalla Avenue and all sectors in between. The Rs. 3.725 billion projects would complete in three years. Another important related project called New Blue Area spanning 170 kanals was inaugurated near F-9 Park with Rs. 30 billion by Prime Minister Imran Khan in an effort to distribute commercial center between future extensions of Islamabad and existing city. Margalla Avenue is significant to the project to connect this new commercial center to the western bank phase II of the city, the auction of this started in July 2020.

== See also ==
- Jinnah Avenue
- Developments in Islamabad
