= Ninth Avenue (Islamabad) =

Road in Islamabad, Pakistan

Coordinates: 33.40°N 73.3°E

- Agha Shahi Avenue
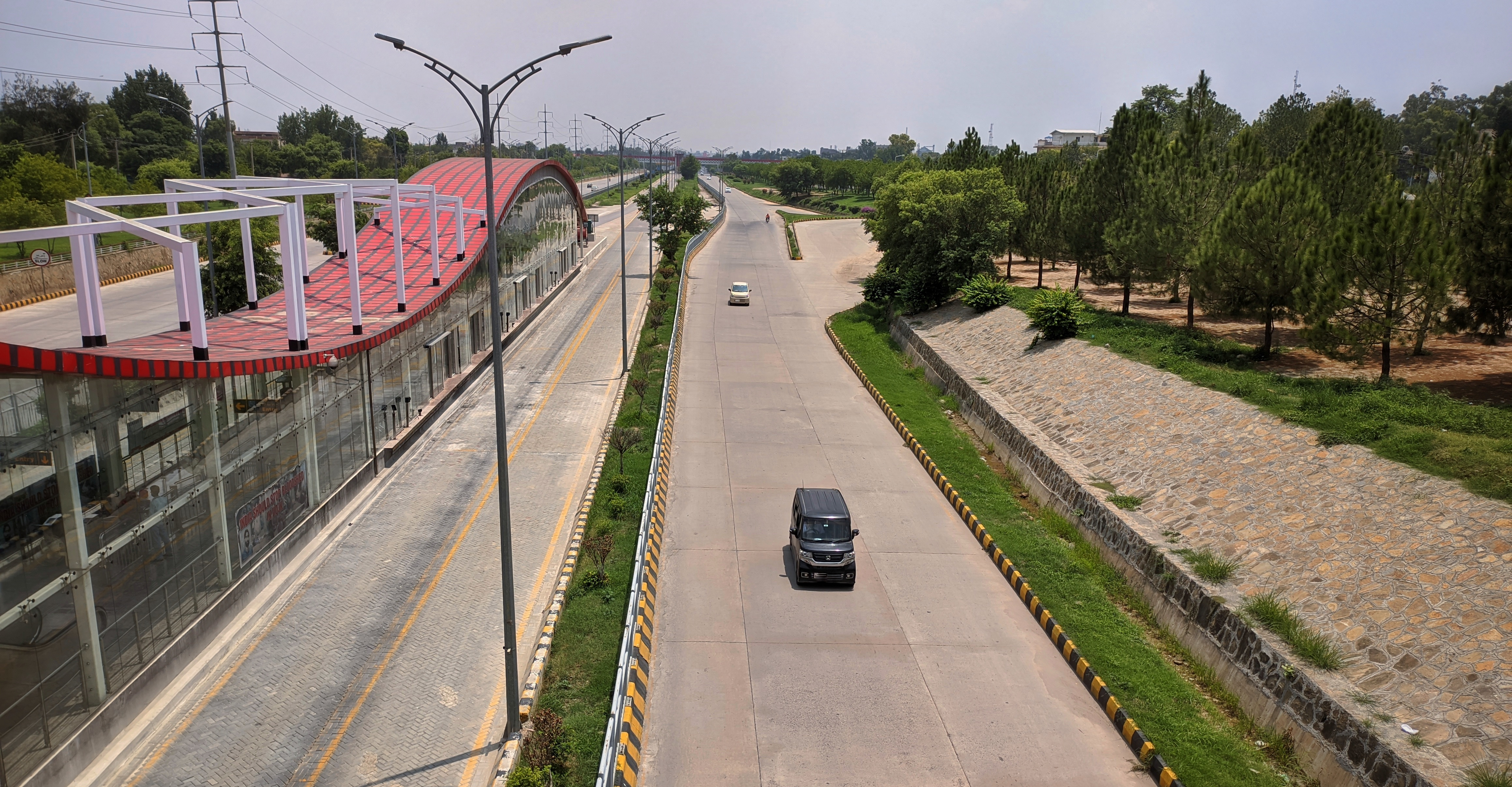
- Faiz Ahmed Faiz Metrobus Station at Ninth Avenue
- Interactive map of Ninth Avenue
- Native name: نائنتھ ایونیو (Urdu); آغا شاہی ایونیو (Urdu)
- Maintained by: Capital Development Authority
- Length: 8 km (5.0 mi)
- North end: Khayaban-e-Iqbal
- Major junctions: Peshawar Morr Interchange
- South end: IJP Road

Construction
- Inauguration: 28 February 2008; 18 years ago

Ninth Avenue also known as Agha Shahi Avenue, named after Pakistani statesman Agha Shahi, is a partially signal free road located in Islamabad. It was inaugurated by the then CDA chairman Kamran Lashari on 25 February 2008.

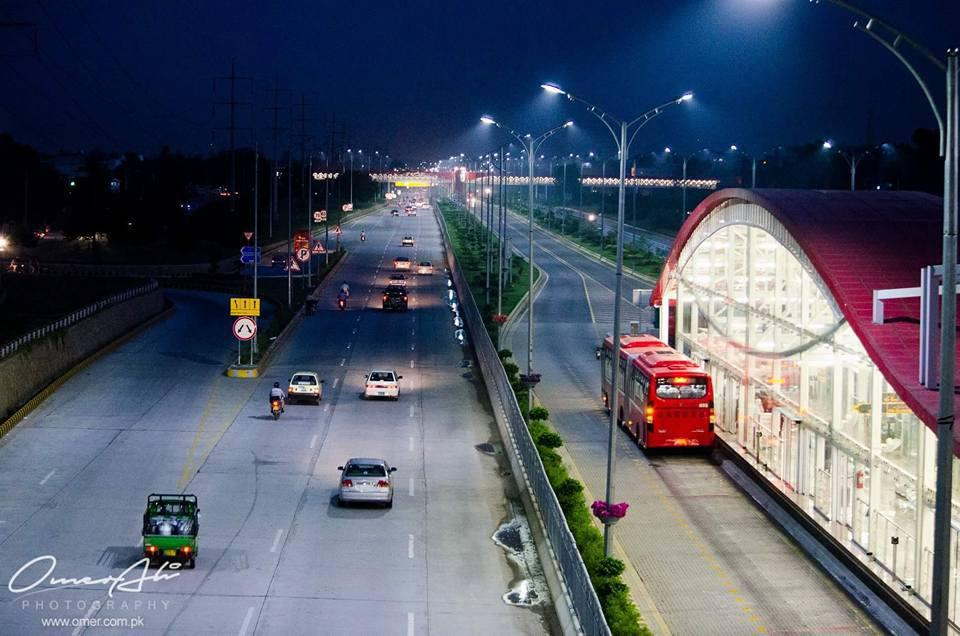
Ninth Avenue at night

It starts from the intersection on Khayaban-e-Iqbal (Margalla Road) near Fatima Jinnah Park and ends at the intersection on IJP Road connecting Rawalpindi and Islamabad. It is stretched between sectors F-8, G-8, H-8, I-8 and F-9, G-9, H-9, I-9. Ninth Avenue was built at a cost of PKR 1,686.373 million.

== See also ==
- Islamabad Highway
- Jinnah Avenue
- Kashmir Highway
- Seventh Avenue (Islamabad)
