= Barakahu =

Bhara Kahu بارہ کہو
- Town
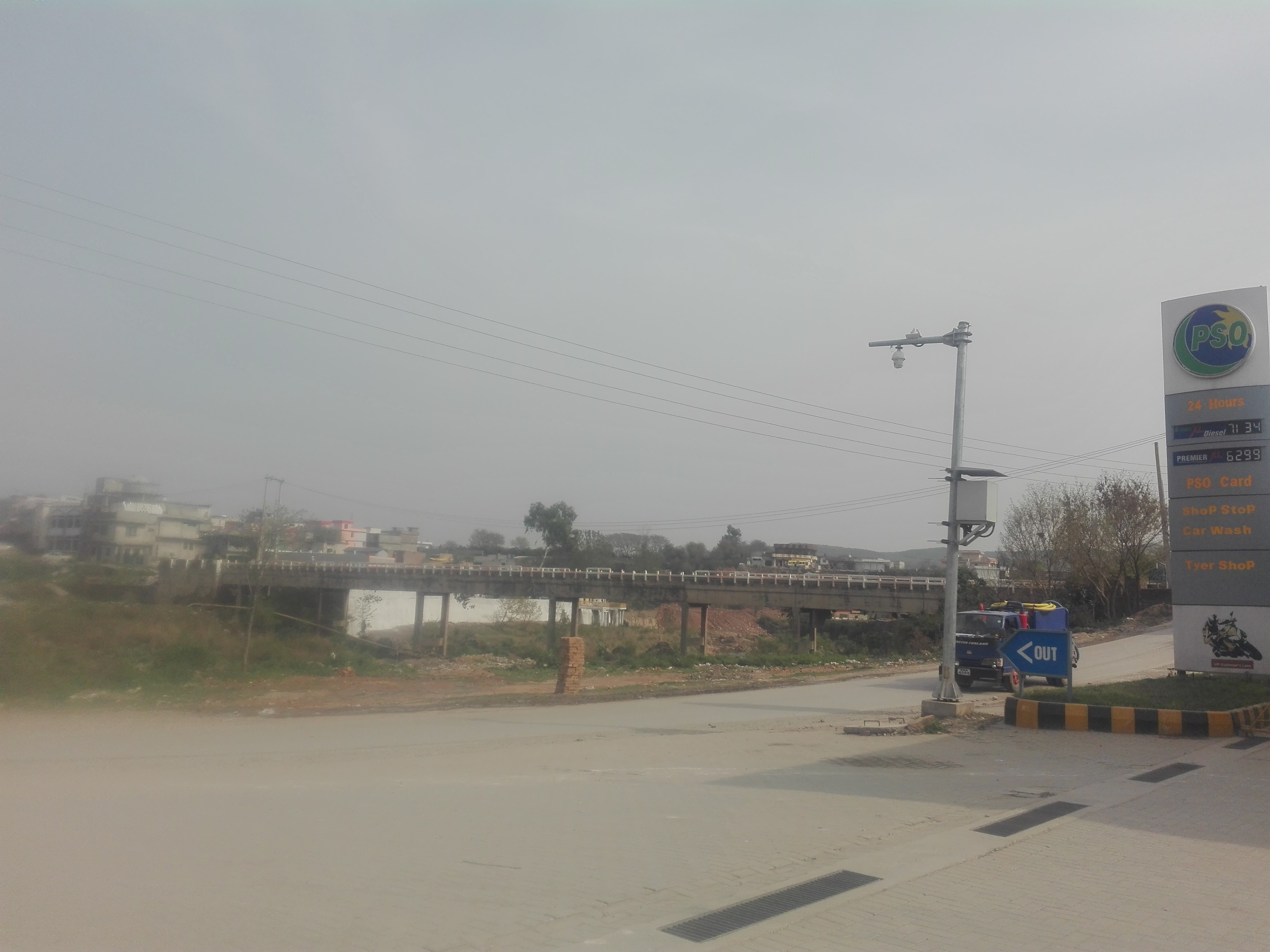
- View of Simly Dam road near Barakahu

- Location in Islamabad Capital Territory Location in Pakistan
- Coordinates: 33.73866882772599°N 73.18346684808866°E
- Country: Pakistan
- Province: Islamabad Capital Territory

Barakahu is a town located 13 kilometer east of downtown Islamabad in the Islamabad Capital Territory (ICT). The area around it consists of 23 union councils, comprising 133 villages, while the urban area of Islamabad has 27 union councils.

Geographically, Barakahu is situated between the provinces of Punjab and Khyber Pakhtunkhwa, and is part of the ICT.

== Toponymy ==
There are different myths about etymology of the town's name.

The most appealing spellings appear to be 'Bhara Kahu' (بھارا کہو). 'Bhara' means haunted and 'Kahu' is lettuce (lactuca sativa) tree in Pothohari. Thus the name means haunted lettuce. It is important to note that the Pakistan Bureau of Statistics uses these spellings in it census reports. Prof. Karam Haidri, an authority on the area, has also used the spellings Bhara Kahu in his Urdu Book Dastan-i-Murree (1950: p.18).

Another spelling 'Barakahu' (بارہ کہو) also comes from the Pothohari language. 'Bara' means twelve (12) and 'Kahu' refers to the lettuce (lactuca sativa). According to a local legend, there were twelve lettuce trees in the area, now known as Barakahu bus stop or Athaal Chowk (اٹھال چوک).

Yet another historical interpretation traces it to the distance of 12 'koh' (an old unit of measurement) from Rawalpindi. A 'koh' is roughly equal to the distance of two English miles. This would make the town's name as 'Barakoh' which is far from reality. If we believe this myth then the distance of the town from Rawalpindi should be 24 miles. But the actual distance is far less than 24 miles which rules out this possibility.

== Demographics ==
As per a 2018 report from the Pakistan Bureau of Statistics, Barakahu accommodates a population exceeding 119,034 individuals. Residents originate from various regions, including Murree, Kashmir, Chitral, Khyber Pakhtunkhwa, Sindh, Balochistan, and Hazara. The area also encompasses a range of minority communities residing within its boundaries.

== Economy ==
On a daily basis, Barakahu generates a considerable amount of solid waste, estimated to range between six and eight tons. In the year 2020, the Capital Development Authority (CDA) made an effort to address this waste issue by initiating street cleaning endeavors. However, it appears that these efforts did not yield a sustainable solution to the problem.

== Education ==
Barakahu is home to a number of educational institutions within its vicinity, among which are notable schools such as Dar e Arqam School and The Educators Barakahu Campus.

== Transportation ==
The Green Line Metro Bus Service commenced its operations in Barakahu on 7 July 2022. This bus service runs between the Barakahu and Pakistan Institute of Medical Sciences Metro Bus Station terminals. Along its route between these endpoints, the Green Line Bus traverses through key locations including Malpur, Lake View Park, Dhokri Chowk, Jinnah Sports Stadium/Aabpara, and Zero Point Interchange.
