= B-17, Islamabad =

B-17 ب ۱۷
- Sector
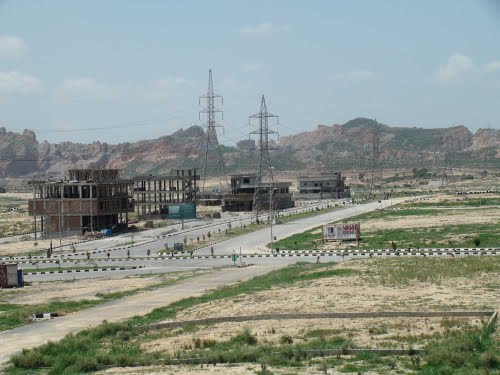
- Sector B-17 under development
- Interactive map of B-17
- Coordinates: 33.680967°N 72.819052°E
- Country: Pakistan
- Territory: Capital Territory
- Zone: II

Government
  - Body: Islamabad Metropolitan Corporation

B-17 (Urdu: حلقہ ب ۱۷) is a sector of Islamabad, Pakistan., developed by Multi-Professional Cooperative Housing Society (MPCHS). The sector is bounded on the east by N-5 National Highway (locally known at Grand Trunk Road) and with the M-1 motorway to the west. B-17 is a newly developing sector located in Zone II of Islamabad Capital Territory. CDA approved and issued no objection certification (NOC) to MPCHS for sector B-17 on 30 January 2008, besides NOC was issued by Federal Directorate of Education (FDE) for construction of schools in the society.

== History of the project ==
MPCHS in 2006 submitted a layout plan to CDA for a multi garden phase-1 project; the project initially comprised Block A, Block B, and Block C. Phase-1 spanned 388.1 hectares (959 acres) with 4670 residential plots along the GT road just a kilometer before Taxila bypass. During this time in 2009 CDA also collaborated with Multi-Professional Cooperative Housing Society (MPCHS) to develop sector E-11 near Golra and Margalla Hills. Latter, MPCHS started phase two of the project, comprising block C-1 extension, block D, block E, and block F. In 2018, MPCHS launched its new sector block G touching the motorway.

== Sectors as per CDA Layout Plan ==
It is interesting to note that Block A of sector B-17 is actually the A-17 sector of Islamabad. Besides, Block C of sector B-17 is technically the B-18 sector of Islamabad, and only block B is actually the B-17 sector as per the official layout plan of Islamabad. Similarly, Block D is “B18”, while Block E and Block F exist in A19. However, since MPCHS develops all of the blocks, it was named B-17 with different blocks.

== Future projects linked to B-17 ==
An important aspect of this project is 9 kilometres. Margalla Avenue, which will connect sector D-12 Islamabad to B -17 G.T. road. However, Margalla Avenue remains incomplete till 2020 due to some legal and land acquisition issues. In January 2020, it was announced by Rawalpindi Development Authority (RDA) that Rawalpindi Ring Road would be extended to Sangjani and would be connected to future Margala road project. In September 2020, Chief Minister Punjab Sardar Usman Buzdar approved Rs. 50 billion Rawalpindi Ring Road project enabling easy connection of western sectors including B17 of Islamabad to connect to Rawalpindi.

A new project launched by Ch. Qamar Zaman and Ch. Saad is known as New City Paradise. The developers are New City Wah.

== Blocks and development progress ==
B-17 is currently divided into seven blocks:

- Block A
- Block B
- Block B-1
- Block C
- Block C-1
- Block D not fully developed
- Block E
- Block F
- Block G (Launched in 2018, Under Construction)
