= Alipur and Farash, Pakistan =

Alipur Farash
- Town
- Location within Pakistan
- Coordinates: 33.648°N 73.187°E
- Country: Pakistan
- Province: Islamabad Capital Territory
- Time zone: UTC+5 (PST)

Alipur and Farash are two separate villages which are centuries old, whereas "Farash Town" is a settlement on the land acquired by the Capital Development Authority from the people of surrounding villages like Farash and Punjgran. Alipur and Farash, in Islamabad, are located on the Lehtrar road approx. 17 km from Rawal lake and 9 km from Chak Shahzad. Farash is a Capital Development Authority approved model urban shelter scheme which came into being in 1990. Homeless people from Bari Imam and other Kachi Abadis of Islamabad were settled in Farash.

The name of village Alipur refers to Baba Ali Muhammad, the ancestor of Maliks and Khokhars living in Alipur, whereas a number of people of other origins have also migrated to Alipur over a last two decades, which has turned this small village into a big town consisting of a population of approximately more than 30,000. In Alipur, there is also shrine of Shah Sultan, a saint who gave shelter to Baba Ali Muhammad and helped him to make this area his habitat. As compared to Alipur, Farash is a mix of different clans which include Rajput, Mangrals, Bhattis, Qazis and Janjuas. Alipur Farash are adjoining villages and have a number of things in common. They select their local representatives for Union Council Alipur. Besides Tarlai and Kuri, Alipur and Farash have emerged as the major town of rural area of Islamabad. Farash is mainly the village of numbardars the main clan in the villages is Raja (Janjuas).

As of 2011 there were approximately 2,000 homes in Farash town. Despite being one of the CDA's "model villages" it resembles a typical unplanned settlement with nominal municipal facilities. Alipur Farash residents have been facing problems due to shortage of drinking water, poor sewerage and lack of other basic facilities.

According to unofficial figures, there are 28 katchi abadis (informal settlements)in Islamabad inhabited by more than 70,000 dwellers in poor living conditions. Under the urban shelter programme, CDA has acknowledged 10 katchi abadis for provision of basic facilities.

== See also ==
- Capital Development Authority
- Developments in Islamabad
- Humak Town
- Rawal Town
- Margalla Town
- Hamdani Town
- Shahzad Town
