= Shahzad Town =

Coordinates: 31°49′N 74°16′E

- Model Town
- Shahzad Town
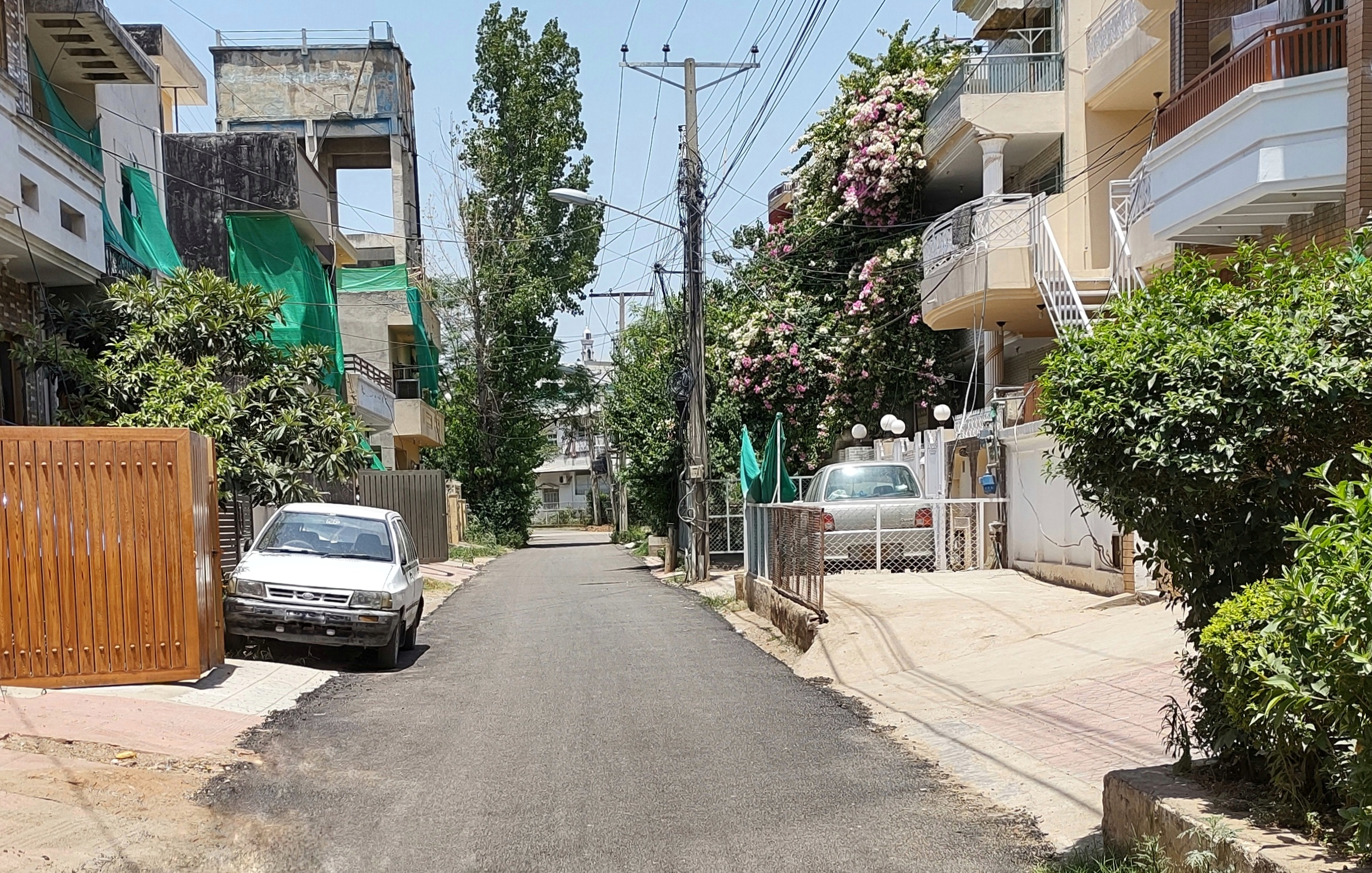
- Typical street of Shahzad Town
- Interactive map of Shahzad Town
- Country: Pakistan
- City: Islamabad

Shehzad Town is a model town of Islamabad that is located adjacent to Chak Shahzad. It is located near the National Agricultural Research Centre and the farm house that was owned by Pakistan's former Army General and President Pervez Musharraf. Pakistan's famous columnist and journalist Javed Chaudhry also has a house here.

== Incidents ==
In October 2011, police arrested two suspected terrorists and recovered large caches of explosives and ammunition from their house located near the suburb.
