= King Hamad University of Nursing and Associated Medical Sciences =

Public university in Pakistan

King Hamad University of Nursing and Associated Medical Sciences, Islamabad has been established at Chak Shehzad Islamabad with the cooperation of government of Bahrain. King of Bahrain Hamad bin Essa al Khalifa supported the project for establishing the first ever state-of-the-art Nursing university in Pakistan. Prime Minister Nawaz Sharif laid the foundation of the university;

The university is the symbol of firm bonds of brotherhood and friendship between the two countries.

The University will be established on 237 kanals at Park Road Chak Shahzad near National Institute of Health, Health Service Academy and COMSATS. The First nursing university of the country would provide residential facility to 1,000 female students approximately. The land utilization will be provided by government of Pakistan and the government of Bahrain will bear the funding and construction for the university. The university is expected to cater 2,000 students and provide 500 admissions each year.

== History ==
Hamad Bin Isa Al-Khalifa, King of Bahrain visited Pakistan in March 2014, he had graciously showed interest for establishing a state-of-the-art medical institution as a gift by the people of Bahrain.

== See also ==
- Nursing in Pakistan
- Bahrain–Pakistan relations
