= Malpur, Islamabad =

Village in Islamabad

Coordinates: 33°43′40″N 73°8′38″E

Malpur is one of the oldest villages in Islamabad located off the Murree Road.Its history goes back much further than the creation of Islamabad in 1960.

== History ==
Malpur is an old village near Rawal Lake and Murree Road. Malpur was initially affiliated with Qutab Shahi Awan Tribe (Owner of Malpur).

Sardar Badhan Khan Awan, the first person who established and settled in Malpur. Archaeological research indicates that the area was inhabited centuries before the development of modern Islamabad. Later on other communities including Gakhar(Kamlal),Sheikh and Khokhar also became inhabitants on the land of Malpur.The Department of Archaeology and Museums records an archaeological settlement mound on the northern side of Malpur, near Rawal Lake, dating approximately to the 1st–5th century CE. Archaeological finds from the site reportedly include pottery fragments, a stone pestle, human bones, and a copper coin.

== Jinnah's connection with Malpur ==
According to a report published by Business Recorder, local representative Syed Bukhari stated that Quaid-e-Azam Muhammad Ali Jinnah and his sister Fatima Jinnah stopped at Malpur while returning to Rawalpindi from Srinagar and addressed a gathering there.

The account is reported by Business Recorder and is attributed to a local representative. Further primary-source documentation would be needed to establish the precise date and details of the visit.

== See also ==
- Developments in Islamabad
- Islamabad Model Villages
- Bani Gala, Islamabad
- Rawal lake
