= Seventh Avenue (Islamabad) =

Street in Islamabad, Pakistan

- Ahmed Nadeem Qasmi Avenue احمد ندیم قاسمی ایونیو
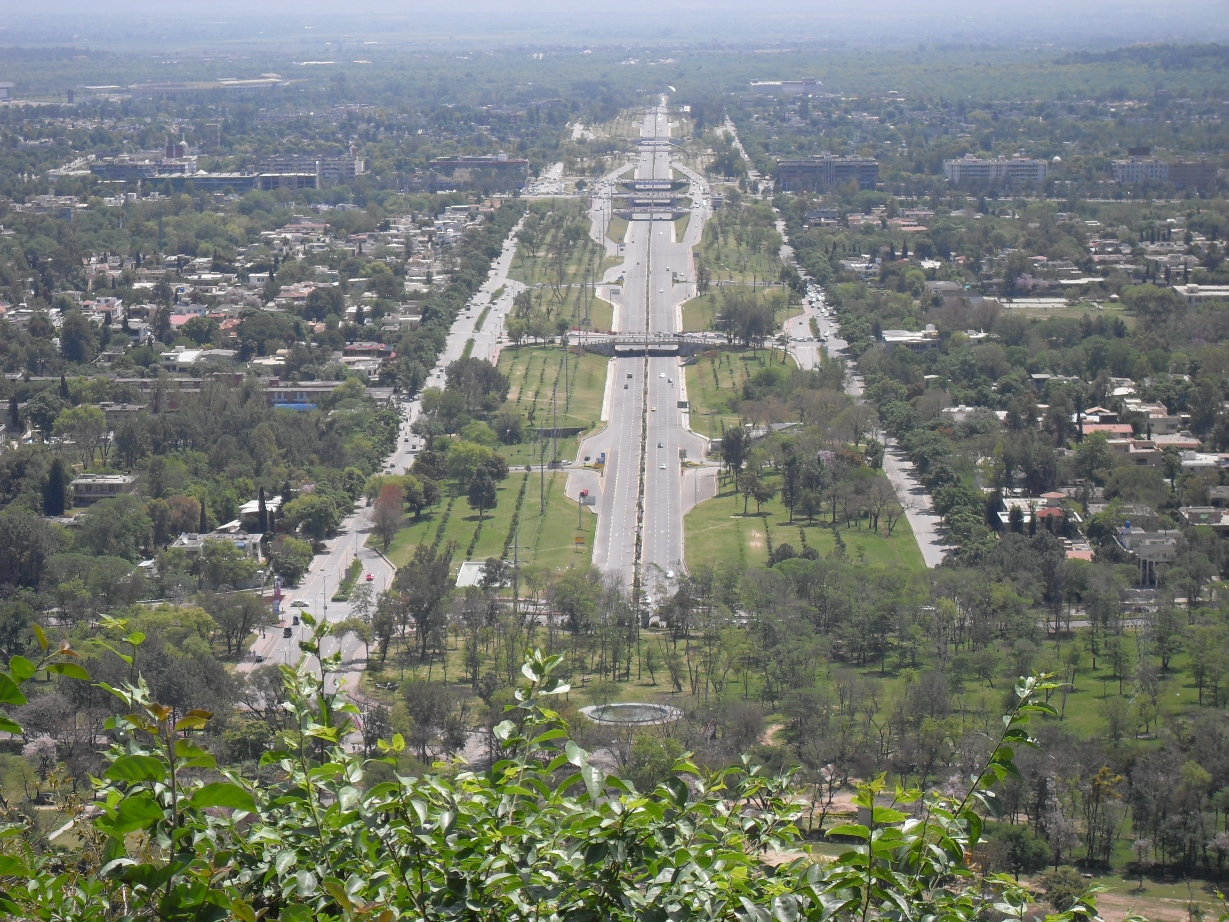
- Namesake: Ahmed Nadeem Qasmi
- Maintained by: Capital Development Authority
- Length: 4 km (2.5 mi)
- Location: Islamabad
- Postal code: 44000
- Nearest Rawalpindi-Islamabad Metrobus station: 7th Avenue
- North end: Islamabad Zoo
- South end: Srinagar Highway

Construction
- Inauguration: 2006; 20 years ago

Seventh Avenue, also known as the Ahmed Nadeem Qasmi Avenue, is a signal free road located in Islamabad. It starts from the intersection on Khayaban-e-Iqbal (Margalla Road) near Islamabad Zoo, and ends at the intersection on Srinagar Highway.

Seventh Avenue was built at a cost of about PKR 70 million. Recently, local traffic police decided to install speed cameras on the road to check over speeding motorists.

On 25 February 2017, the Capital Development Authority decided to rename the road after the late writer Ahmad Nadeem Qasmi. The approval required for this was sent to the federal cabinet, however, no approval for the renaming was reported.

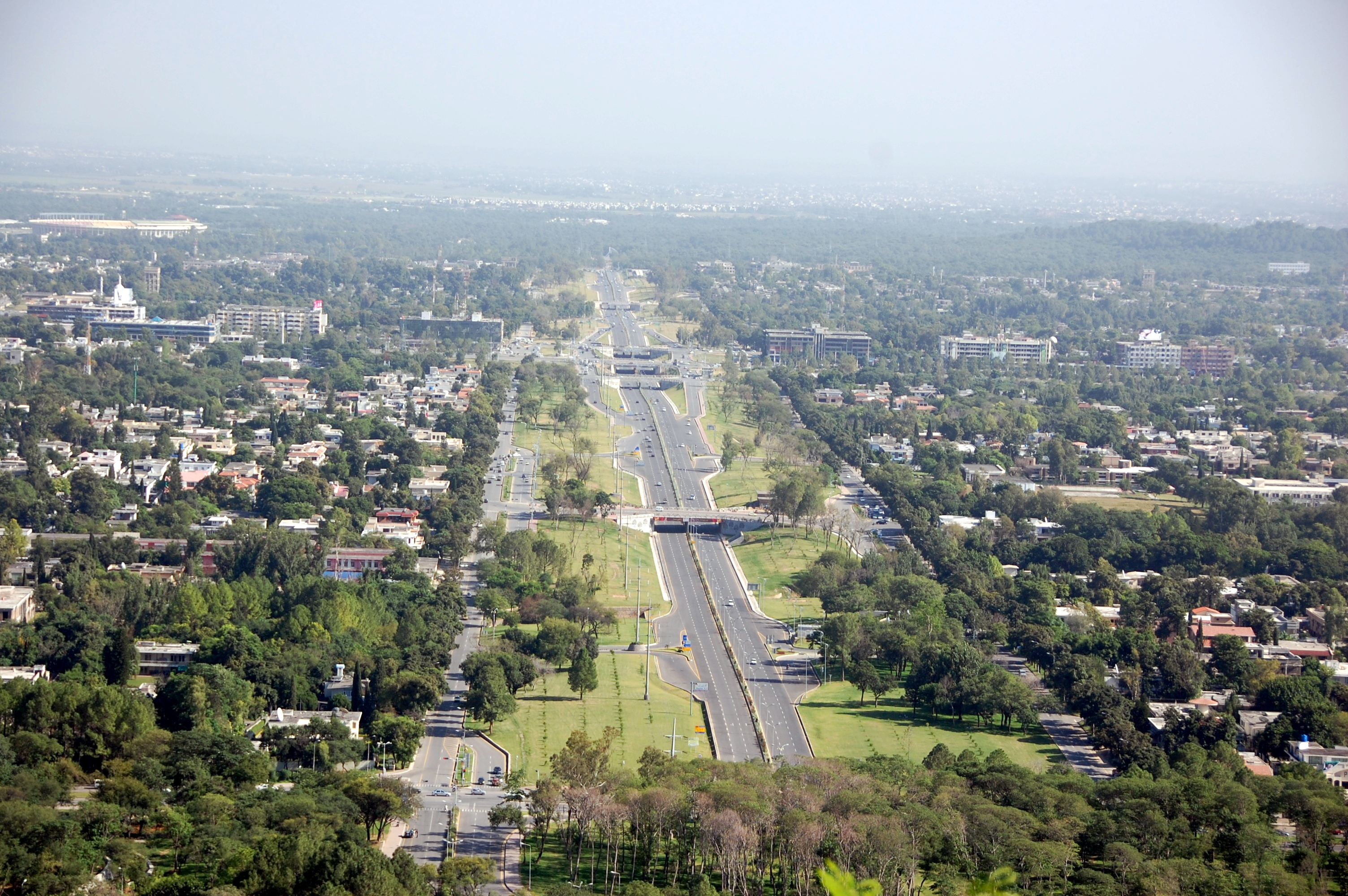
View of Seventh Avenue from Daman-e-Koh (Northern end)

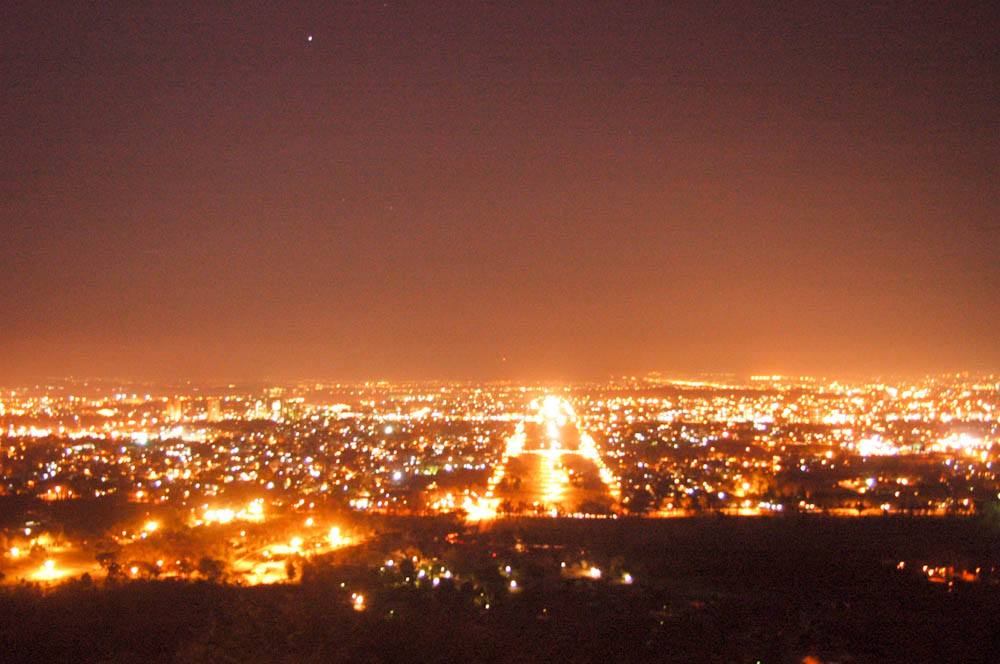
View of Seventh Avenue from Daman-e-Koh (Northern end) at night

== See also ==
- Islamabad Highway
- Jinnah Avenue
- Faizabad Interchange
- Kashmir Highway
