= Srinagar Highway =

Highway in Islamabad, Pakistan

Srinagar Highway شاہراہ سری نگر
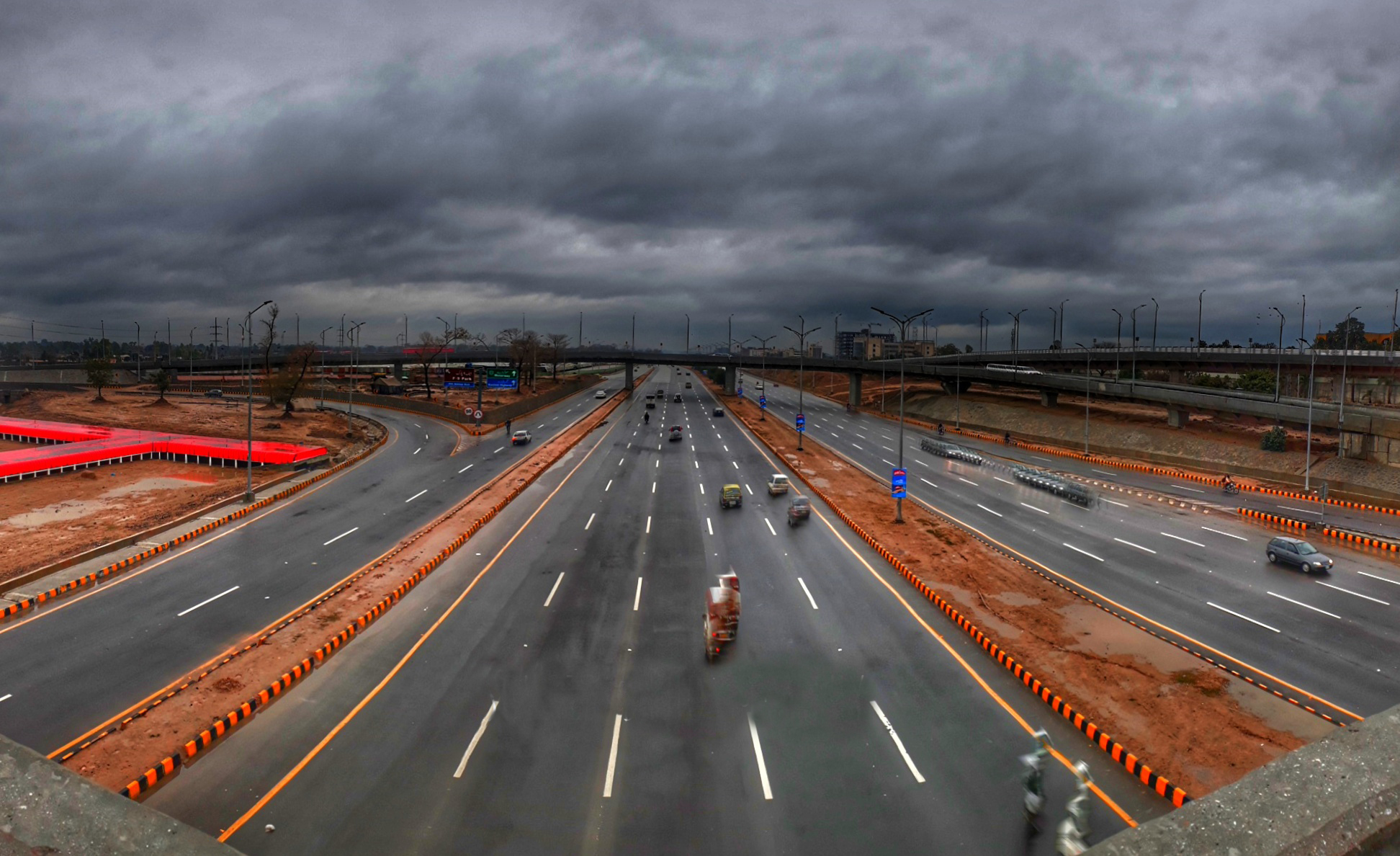
- Peshawar Morr Interchange, 2017

Route information
- Maintained by the Capital Development Authority
- Length: 25 km (16 mi)
- Existed: 1973–present

Major junctions
- East end: E-75 Expressway Murree Road
- Rawalpindi Ninth Avenue; Zero Point Interchange Islamabad Motorways Interchange
- West end: Islamabad International Airport

Location
- Country: Pakistan
- Regions: Islamabad Capital Territory

Highway system
- Roads in Pakistan

The Srinagar Highway (Urdu: شاہراہ سری نگر), formerly known as the Kashmir Highway (شاہراہ کشمیر), is a major east–west highway in the Islamabad Capital Territory of Pakistan. It provides quick access through Islamabad and connects the Islamabad International Airport in the west to the E-75 Expressway in the east. Running for 25 kilometres (16 mi), the highway's width varies from three lanes to five lanes, with a total of five interchanges.

== Name ==
Originally named after Kashmir from 1973 to 2020, the highway was renamed after the city of Srinagar to commemorate the first official Youm-e-Istehsal, which has been an annual observance in Pakistan as an expression of the country's solidarity with the Kashmiri people every 5 August—the day on which Jammu and Kashmir's special status was revoked in 2019. Despite the name, the highway is not connected to Srinagar, which is the capital of Indian administered Kashmir.

== Interchanges and exits ==
Intersections	Traffic Control Method
Srinagar, Muzaffarabad, Murree, E-75 Expressway (North Exit), Kashmir Chowk, Faizabad, Rawalpindi (South Exit)	Jinnah Square
Serena Hotel, Pakistan Secretariat, Parliament House, Diplomatic Enclave (North Exit), Club Road (South Exit)	Jinnah Square
Khayaban-e-Suharwardy (North Exit)	Khayaban-e-Suharwardy Interchange (North exit only)
Seventh Avenue (North Exit), Garden Avenue (South Exit)	Mehfooz Shaheed Interchange
Faisal Avenue, Faisal Mosque, Blue Area (North Exit) Islamabad Expressway, Lahore, Gujranwala (South Exit)	Zero Point Interchange
Margalla Road, 9th Avenue (North Exit) Rawalpindi, IJP Road, Ninth Avenue (South Exit)	Peshawar Morr Interchange
Sector G-9 (North Exit)	G-9 Interchange
Sectors G-10, F-10 (North Exit)	G-10 Interchange
Sectors H-11, I-11, IJP Road (South Exit)	H-11 Intersection
Sector G-11, F-11 (North Exit), Sector H-12 (NUST) (South Exit)	G-11/H-12 Interchange
Sector G-13, Golra Sharif (North Exit), Haji Camp, Rawalpindi (South Exit)	Golra Sharif Interchange
Peshawer, Taxila N-5 National Highway (North Exit), Rawalpindi, Lahore (N-5) (South Exit)	G.T Road Interchange
Motorway M-1 (North Exit), M-2 Motorway (South Exit)	Motorway Interchange
Islamabad International Airport	Airport Interchange

== See also ==
- Developments in Islamabad
  - Faizabad Interchange
  - Seventh Avenue (Islamabad)
