= Peshawar Morr Interchange =

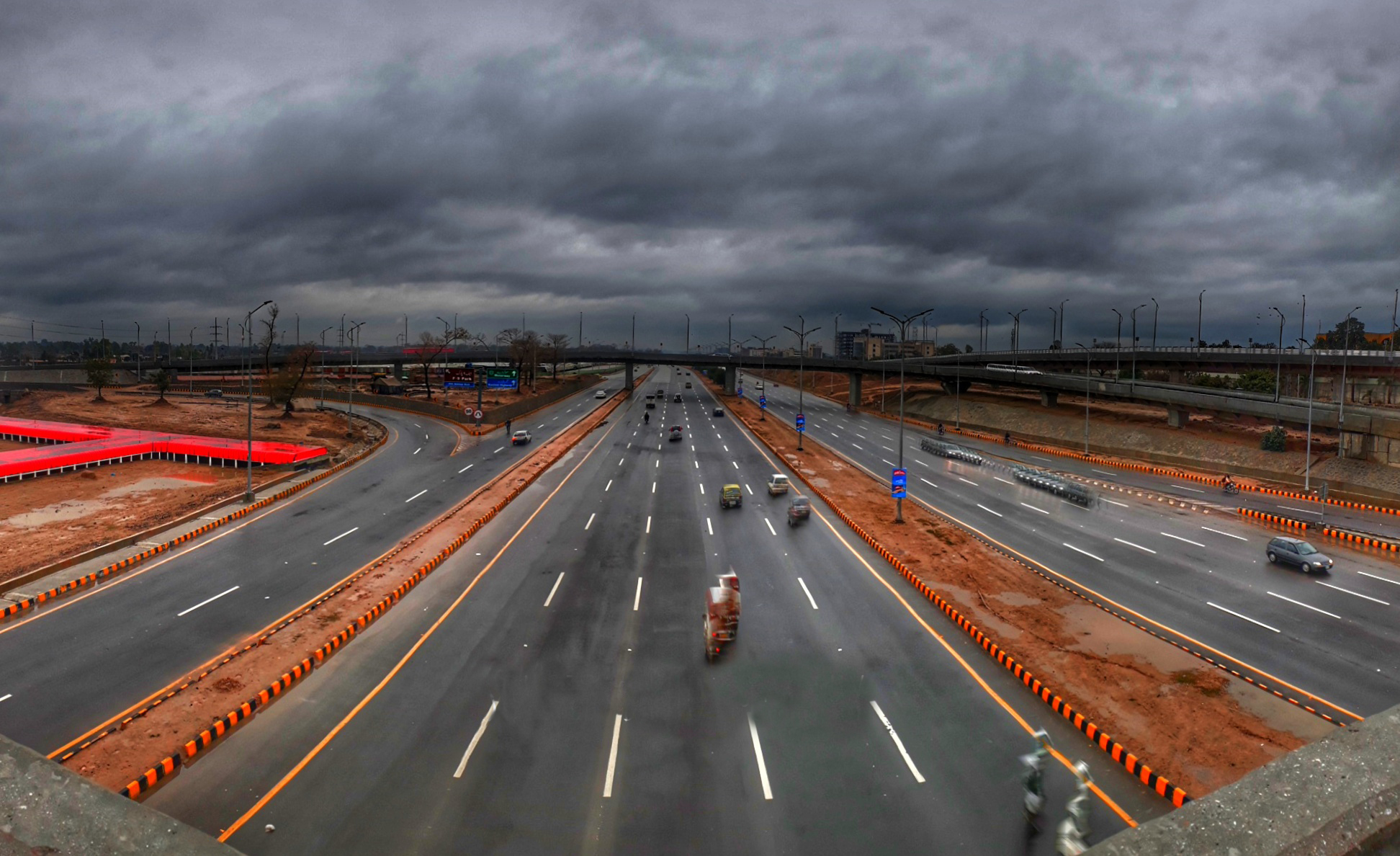
- View of Srinagar Highway from the interchange.
- Interactive map of Peshawar Morr Interchange

Location
- Islamabad
- Coordinates: 33.68453°N 73.04756°E
- Roads at junction: Srinagar Highway; 9th Avenue

Construction
- Type: Partial cloverleaf interchange
- Constructed: 2014–2016
- Opened: March 2016
- Maintained by: Capital Development Authority

Peshawar Morr Interchange (also known as G-9 interchange) is Pakistan's biggest interchange in Islamabad, Pakistan. It is located at the intersection of Srinagar Highway and Ninth Avenue, connecting the G and H sectors of Islamabad.

Peshawar Morr Interchange eased traffic congestion on two main highways of the capital city i.e. Srinagar Highway and Ninth Avenue. It facilitates traffic to the Islamabad International Airport, Lahore–Islamabad Motorway and Islamabad–Peshawar Motorway.

The total length of the overhead, underground and ramp roads of the interchange is approximately 14 km and it features eight flyovers.

The construction of the interchange started in May 2014 along with the construction of Rawalpindi-Islamabad Metrobus, but took longer to complete than anticipated. It costed almost Rs. 6 billion (60 million USD) and was completed by March 2016.

== Etymology ==
Peshawar Morr used to be at the helm of a road leading to Peshawar since not much existed after it during the early times of Islamabad. Back then, it was a well-known stop for vans and buses travelling to Peshawar from Islamabad and vice versa.
