= Bani Gala =

Pakistani village

Bani Gala بنی گالا
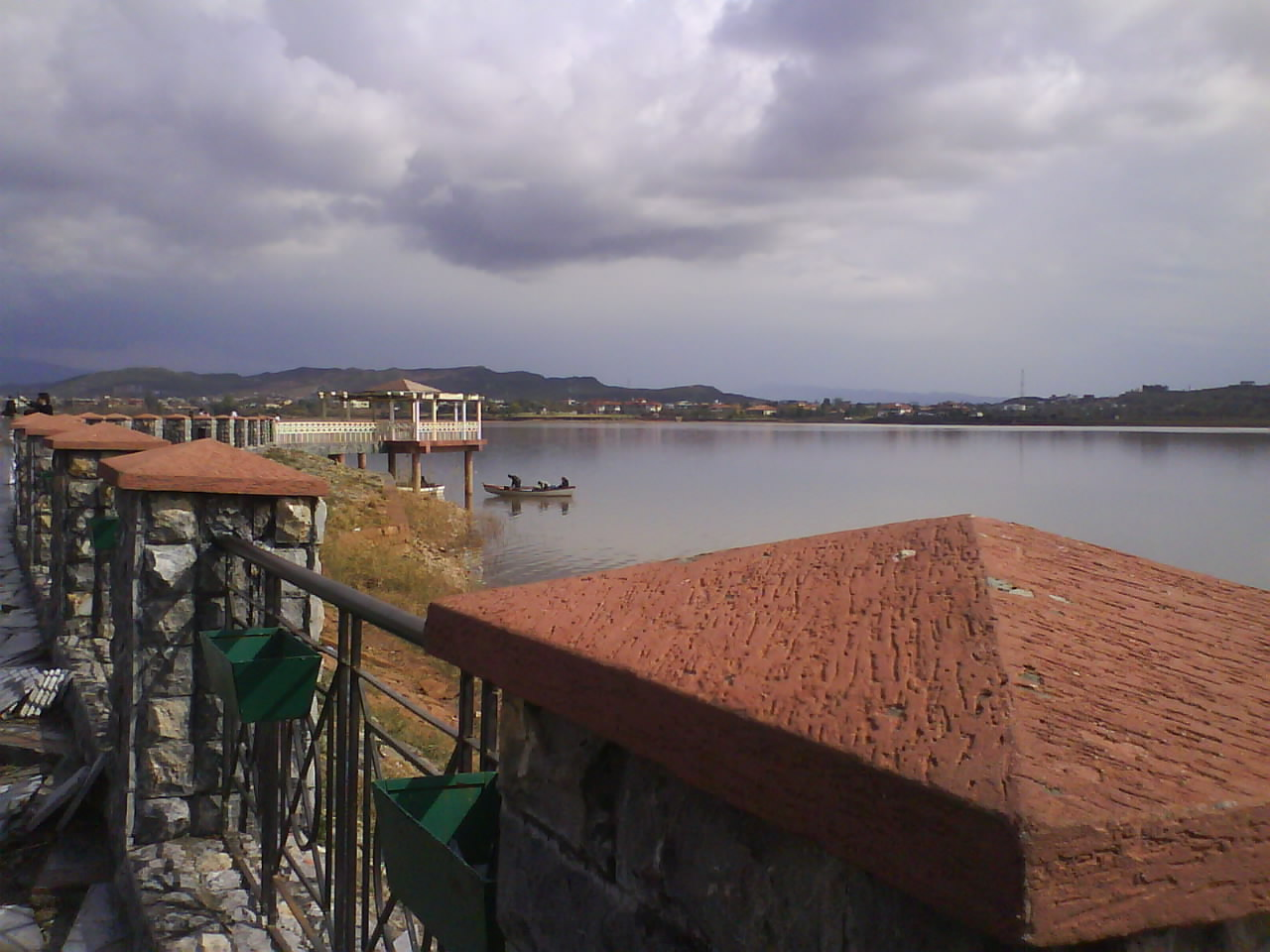
- Rawal Lake
- Interactive map of Bani Gala
- Coordinates: 33.713°N 73.1615°E
- Country: Pakistan
- Province: Islamabad Capital Territory
- Time zone: UTC+5 (PST)

Bani Gala (Urdu: بنی گالا) is a residential area located in Islamabad at the eastern bank of Rawal Lake. It was designed as part of a national park and upscale residential area, but has since been blighted by illegal construction in the area. Regularisation of the settlement has been ordered by Pakistani courts with a new botanical garden being created in 2019.

== History ==
When Islamabad was being planned in the 1960s, the Capital Development Authority planned that Bani Gala would be an upscale settlement within a new national park. During the 1980s, illegal building and encroachment on protected areas started to occur, causing deforestation. The residential area of Bani Gala has been controversial. It became famous after the former head of the country's nuclear bomb programme, Abdul Qadeer Khan, built his house there. In 1992, the CDA attempted to clear the area and destroy the illegally built houses. This was stopped by the Islamabad High Court and Supreme Court of Pakistan in 1999. Since then, the issue of illegal construction the locality had mostly been sidelined.

== Development ==
- Lakhwal Village - that falls on this road - has some residential houses but they have been constructed illegally

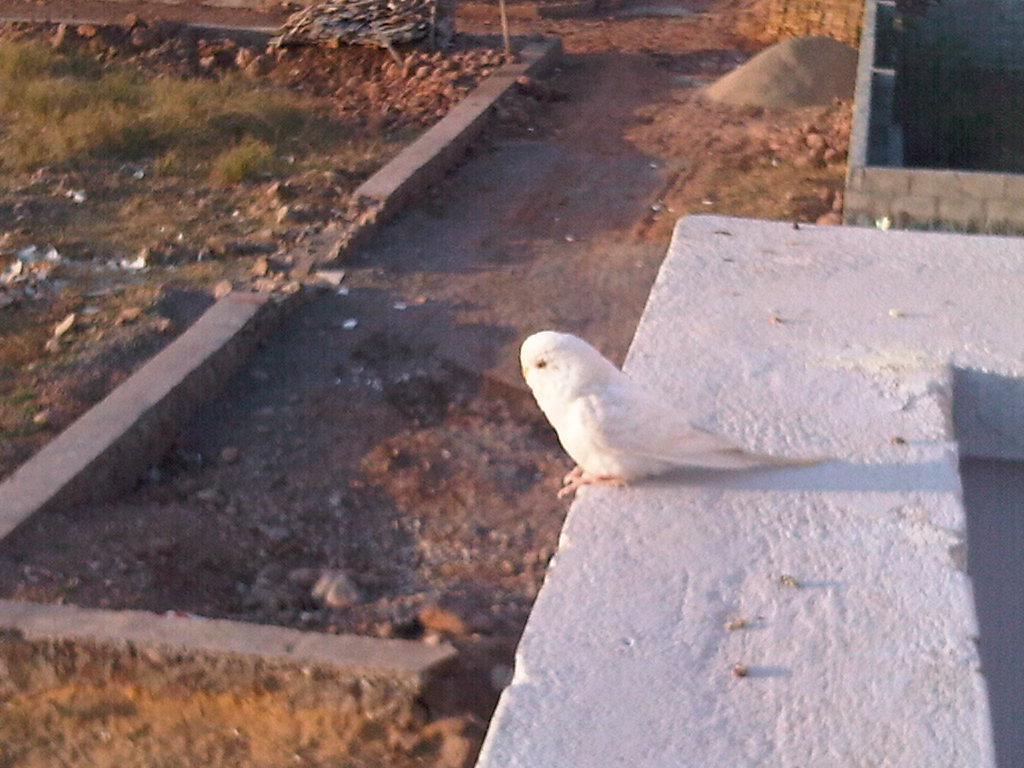
White parrot resting at Bani Gala

- The Korang Tributary is used by birds during their usual migrating patterns to/from North and South of Pakistan. This Siberian Bird Migration has several stops around Islamabad on the way to the hotter south.
- Atif Aslam performed a live musical concert at Beaconhouse Mohranur Campus located in Bani Gala, Islamabad on 10 August 2010.
- Ten Billion Tree Tsunami along with team members of TBTTP from National Strategic Support Unit carried out a plantation activity at Botanical Garden in Bani Gala, Islamabad and planted 1000 trees on 31 December 2021.

== Illegal occupation ==
The issue of illegal occupation and construction in Bani Gala led to a poor sewerage system due to its unplanned nature. Most sanitary work is carried out by self-employed people. A three-member bench of the apex court, headed by Chief Justice of Pakistan Iftikhar Muhammad Chaudhry took suo moto notice over a letter written by Pakistan Tehreek-e-Insaf Chairman Imran Khan against the illegal occupation of state land by the Leader of the House in the Senate Nayyar Bukhari and his relatives. In 2018, the Supreme Court ruled that housing in Bani Gala needed to be regularised. A year later, a large part of Bani Gala was zoned for a new botanical garden.
