= Javed Chaudhry =

Pakistani columnist and journalist (born 1968)

Javed Chaudhry SI TI
- جاوید چوہدری
- Born: 1 January 1968 (age 58); Shah Sarmast, Kharian, West Pakistan (present-day Punjab, Pakistan)
- Education: Islamia University Bahawalpur
- Occupations: Journalist; columnist; YouTuber
- Years active: 1991–present
- Employer(s): Express News (2006–2025); Daily Express (2006–2025); Daily Jang (1997–2006); Khabrain (1991–1997)
- Notable work: Zero Point (compilation of newspaper columns and published books)
- Television: Kal Tak with Javed Chaudhry (2006–2025)
- Father: Chaudhry Muhammad Khan
- Awards: Sitara-i-Imtiaz (2023); Tamgha-e-Imtiaz (2025)
- Website: javedch.com

Javed Chaudhry (Note: Punjabi/Urdu: جاوید چوہدری; Punjabi pronunciation: [d͡ʒəˈʋeːd t͡ʃɔː(ɦ)dəˈɾi]) (born 1 January 1968) is a Pakistani journalist, columnist and YouTuber who hosted the Kal Tak show on Express News from 2006 to 2025. He also wrote Urdu newspaper columns on various topics in his Zero Point column series in the Daily Express, and prior in the Daily Jang. (Note: Sources:)

== Early life and education ==
Javed Chaudhry was born on 1 January 1968, to Chaudhry Muhammad Khan, in the village of Shah Sarmast within the Kharian Tehsil of Gujrat District in Punjab. He hails from a Gujjar Punjabi family. He graduated from the Islamia University of Bahawalpur with a degree in Mass Communication. He also enrolled in a few courses at Johns Hopkins University and Columbia University.

== Career ==
Javed Chaudhry started journalism in 1991, with work on Daily Ummat and Daily Khabrain. He has been writing Urdu columns since 1997 under the header Zero Point. In 1997, he joined Daily Jang as a columnist. All Pakistan Newspapers Society declared him The Best Urdu Columnist of 1997 and 1998. He left Jang and joined Express News in 2006, and has been hosting a political talk show titled Kal Tak since 2008. Since 2010, he has also been writing English columns for The Express Tribune.

During his career, Javed has interviewed some of the prominent personalities, such as Malala Yousafzai, former president of Pakistan Pervez Musharraf, Shah Mahmood Qureshi, Chairman PTI Imran Khan and Co-chair PPPP Bilawal Bhutto Zardari.

== Controversies and criticism ==
Javed Chaudhry has faced criticism on multiple accounts. In 2012, he was accused of victim blaming, on the basis of his April 1 column in the Urdu newspaper Daily Express. In 2018, in his satirical article, he claimed that Bushra Bibi married Imran Khan, after being directed by the Prophet in a dream. Bushra blatantly rejected this claim.

Javed was also criticized for doing nothing, during popular stand-off between Qadir Mandokhail and Firdous Ashiq Awan which led to Awan slapping Mandokhail, on his show. In 2019, he published alleged interview of by-then NAB chairman Javed Iqbal in his column published in Daily Express, which NAB called fake and untrue.

== Books ==
Title	Publisher	Publication year	Pages	ISBN	Ref
Zero Point 1	Ilm o Irfan Publishers, Lahore	2000	320	ISBN 978-9674902599	
Zero Point 2	Ilm o Irfan Publishers, Lahore	2005	312	ISBN 978-9697244461	
Gaye Dino Ke Suraj	Romail Publications, Rawalpindi	2010	280	ISBN 978-9693362466	
Zero Point 3	Ilm o Irfan Publishers, Lahore	2010	328	ISBN 978-9697447336	
Zero Point 4	Ilm o Irfan Publishers, Lahore	2010	320	ISBN 978-9698837068	
Zero Point 5	Ilm o Irfan Publishers, Lahore	2015	400	ISBN 978-9693942651	
Kal Tak	Ilm o Irfan Publishers, Lahore	2015	400	ISBN 978-9690443342	
Zero Point 6	Ilm o Irfan Publishers, Lahore	2015	400	ISBN 978-9697371365	

== Awards ==
- In November 2023, Islamia University of Bahawalpur awarded him an honorary PhD degree recognising his services in the field of journalism.
- Sitara-i-Imtiaz (Star of Excellence) Award by the Government of Pakistan for his services in journalism in 2023.
