= Zero Point Interchange =

Cloverleaf interchange in Islamabad, Pakistan

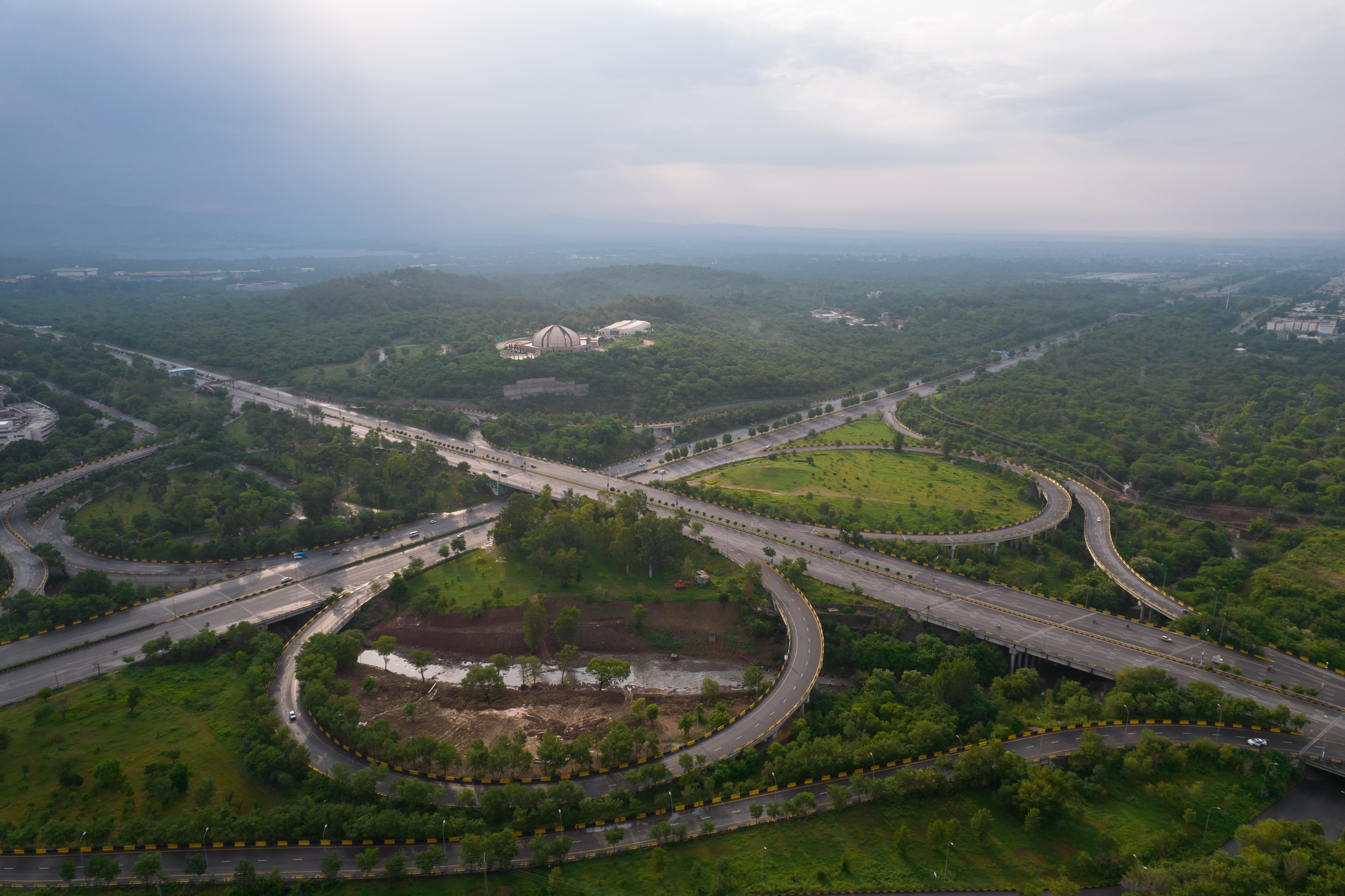
- An aerial view of Zero Point Interchange, with Pakistan Monument in the background
- Interactive map of Zero Point Interchange

Location
- Islamabad
- Coordinates: 33°41′37″N 73°03′54″E
- Roads at junction: Islamabad Highway, Srinagar Highway, Khayaban-e-Suharwardy

Construction
- Type: Cloverleaf interchange
- Constructed: 2008–2011 by Maqbool Associates (Pvt.) Limited
- Opened: July 5, 2011; 14 years ago
- Maintained by: Capital Development Authority

The Zero Point Interchange is a large cloverleaf interchange in Islamabad, Pakistan, located at the intersection of the Islamabad Expressway, the Srinagar Highway, and Khayaban-e-Suharwardy. It was inaugurated in 5 July 2011 by the Government of Pakistan.

== History ==
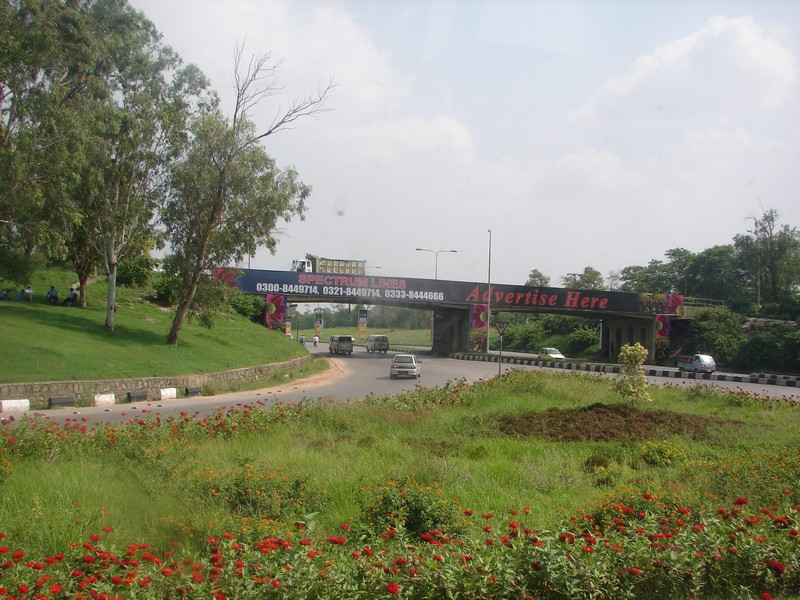
A by-pass (now demolished) at Zero Point

In 1997, a French firm had been hired to come up with the PC-I of the project, but the Capital Development Authority had rejected it. Technical flaws and political interference led to the project being put on hold five times. The interchange was designed by ECIL, and construction work started on 11 September 2008. Mumtaz Hussain served as the project director. The project was to be completed in two phases: in the first phase, three major loops of the interchange were to be constructed, while in the second, two more loops connecting Shakarparian and Khayaban-e-Suharwardy were to be built.

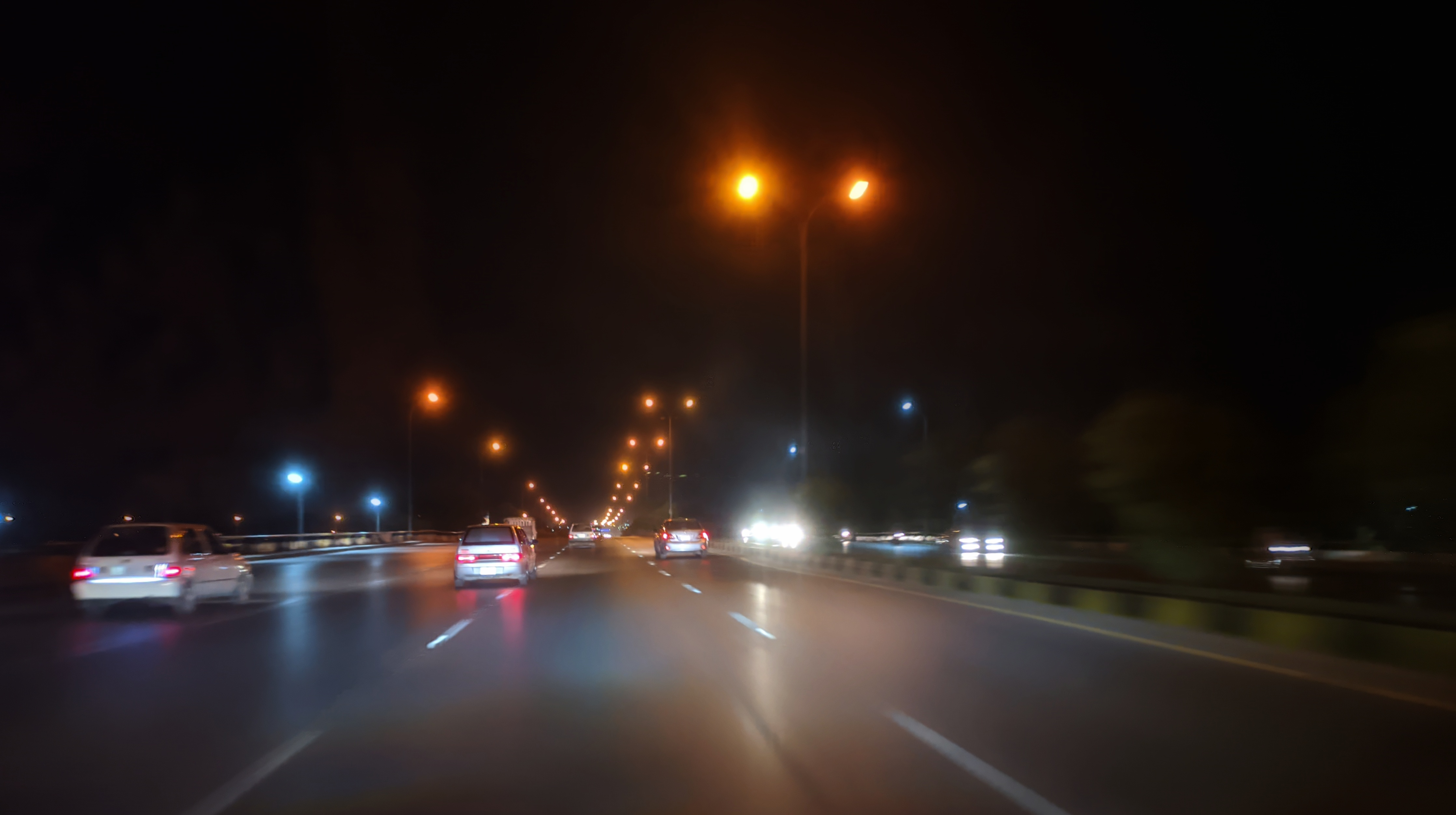
Zero Point Interchange at night from Srinagar Highway

The first deadline of the project was 31 September 2010 at a cost of Rs. 2.75 billion. This was extended to 31 December 2010 after its cost was revised. Further irregularities forced the cost to rise to Rs. 4.1 billion, but the second deadline was also missed as work on the Islamabad Highway and Srinagar Highway (then known as Kashmir Highway) was still in progress. However, the adjacent link roads had been opened since 98% of the work had been completed.

The interchange was formally inaugurated on 5 July 2011 by the then Prime Minister of Pakistan, Yousaf Raza Gillani, though construction work on a loop was still in progress. The construction of the interchange was fully completed in 2012.
