= Rawalpindi Ring Road =

Carriageway located in Punjab province of Pakistan

Route information
- Length: 38.3 km (23.8 mi)
- History: • Foundation stone laid on 19 March 2022 and 8 August 2023 by two different prime ministers • Inauguration expected in December 2026

Major junctions
- Loop around Rawalpindi
- From: Banth (Rawalpindi)
- To: Thalian (Rawalpindi)

Location
- Country: Pakistan

Highway system
- Roads in Pakistan

The Rawalpindi Ring Road is an under construction ring road in Pakistan between the cities of Rawalpindi and Islamabad. The foundation stone for the road was laid in March 2022, however, delays due to changes in political setup, land acquisition issues, and redesigns, resulted in construction work beginning in September 2023. Upon completion, the highway is expected to have six lanes. The ring road will start from Banth, between Mandra and Rawat and end near Thalian interchange close to the Lahore-Islamabad Motorway. The project was originally proposed in 1991, under the government of Nawaz Sharif, however due to political turmoil the project never materialized. During Shahbaz Sharif's visit to China in 2010 as Chief Minister of Punjab, the project was discussed between Pakistani and Chinese authorities to secure funding. In 2017, the project was again briefed to the Asian Development Bank to secure funding for the project.

== Exits ==
Rawalpindi Ring Road Junctions
Interchange	Junction	Westbound Exits	Eastbound Exits
Banth Interchange	Exit 1	Start of Rawalpindi Ring Road	Rawat (Islamabad), N-5
Miana Mohra Interchange	Exit 2	Dhoke Budhal	Rawat
Adiala Road Interchange	Exit 3	Dhalla	Adiala
Kolian Parr Interchange	Exit 4	Chakri	Rawalpindi
Thalian Interchange	Exit 5	Lahore, M-2	Start of Rawalpindi Ring Road
Road continues as Islamabad International Airport access road

== Overview ==
Islamabad–Rawalpindi metropolitan area, consisting of the twin cities of Islamabad & Rawalpindi, is the third largest populated metropolitan area in Pakistan. The twin cities are connected to the major economic centers of Pakistan through N-5 National Highway, an important bottleneck on the route of the national highway is the main city area of Rawalpindi, the Rawalpindi Ring Road, also known as the R3 project, was initiated to ease the flow of traffic. The project is planned to have five interchanges at Banth, Maira Mohra, Adyala Road, Kolian Parr, and Thallian. The project is estimated to cost PKR 39 billion out of which PKR 6 billion has been planned for land acquisition.

== Route Redirection Scandal ==
In 2018, a fresh Project concept (PC-1) feasibility report was undertaken by the Punjab Government, due to the previously conducted feasibility reports deemed old. In April 2021, the bidding process was put on hold and Prime Minister Imran Khan ordered an inquiry into the alleged route change of the project to benefit private housing schemes and government officials. The country's top anti graft body NAB also took notice of the alleged scam and initiated an inquiry. The main opposition party called for the removal of Chief Minister Usman Buzdar, Special Assistant to Prime Minister Zulfi Bukhari and Federal Aviation Minister Ghulam Sarwar Khan as the main beneficiaries of the scam.

Special Assistant to Prime Minister on Overseas Pakistani's and Human Resource Development, Zulfi Bhukari, resigned on 17 May from his position, citing the allegation of scam against him.
