= Blue Area =

Blue Area بلیو ایریا
- Central Business District
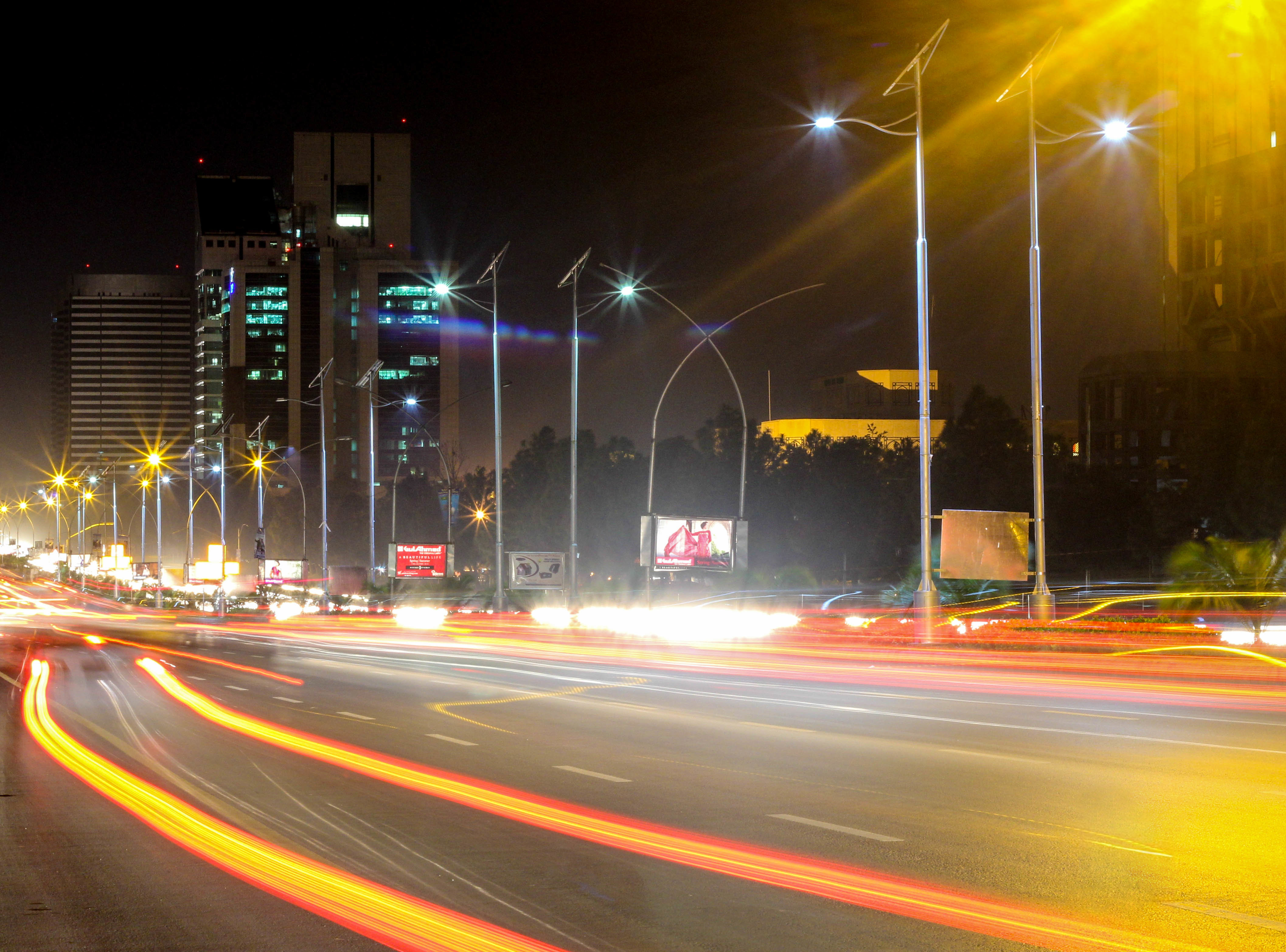
- Night view of Blue Area, the commercial hub of Islamabad.
- Interactive map of Blue Area
- Coordinates: 33.7182°N 73.0714°E
- Country: Pakistan
- City: Islamabad

Blue Area (Urdu: نیلا رقبہ) is the central business district of Islamabad, Pakistan along the Jinnah Avenue. The area is a 2-kilometer (1.2 mi)-long corridor along Islamabad's Khayaban-e-Quaid-e-Azam (also known as Jinnah Avenue),

== Public services ==
On 4 July 2016, the first National Database and Registration Authority mega centre was inaugurated in Islamabad's Blue Area with a capacity of processing 2000 applicants daily.
