= Capital Development Authority (Pakistan) =

Autonomous civic organization working under Ministry of Interior, Pakistan

- وفاقی ترقیاتی ادارہ

Public benefit corporation overview
- Formed: June 14, 1960; 66 years ago
- Jurisdiction: Islamabad Capital Territory
- Headquarters: G-7/4, Islamabad
- Employees: 13,000
- Annual budget: Rs. 91.73 billion (2024–2025)
- Minister responsible: Mohsin Naqvi, Minister of Interior
- Public benefit corporation executive: Muhammad Ali Randhawa, Chairman
- Key documents: CDA Ordinance of June 27; Organogram
- Website: cda.gov.pk

Footnotes
- Board: Chairman and Six Members and a labour union leader who works as a collective bargaining agent.

Capital Development Authority (Urdu: وفاقی ترقیاتی ادارہ, abbreviated as CDA) is a public benefit corporation responsible for providing municipal services in Islamabad Capital Territory. The CDA was established on 14 June 1960 by an executive order entitled Pakistan Capital Regulation. As of 2016, most of CDA's municipal services and departments have been transferred to the newly created Islamabad Metropolitan Corporation. However, the CDA is still in charge of estate management, project execution and sector developments.

== History ==
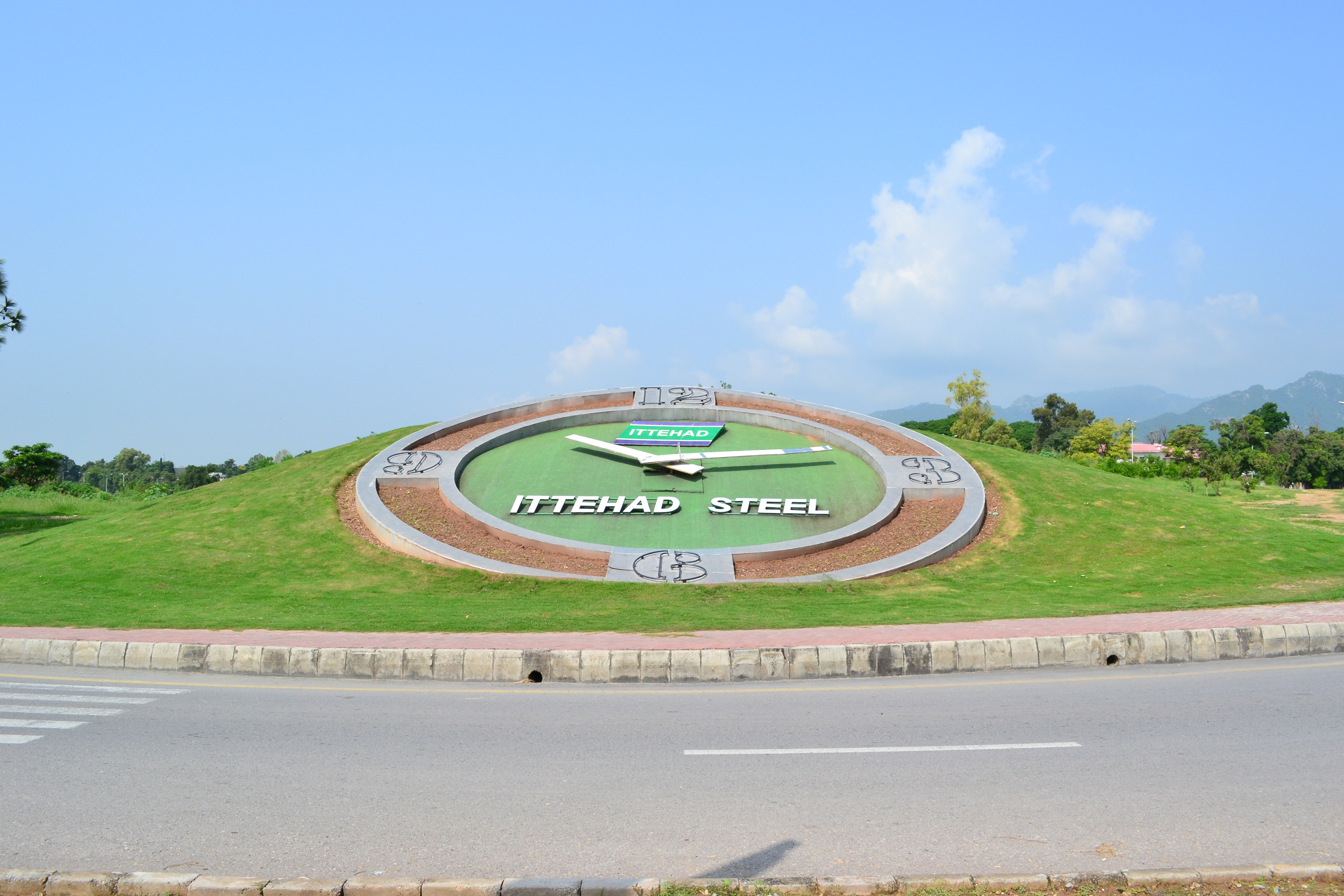
Islamabad Clock.

The organization initially came into being through an executive order but was later superseded by CDA Ordinance issued on June 27, 1960. Major General Yahya Khan was designated as the first chairman on 21 June 1960. The Capital Development Authority developed the CDA Model School in Islamabad in 1970. It is one of the oldest civic organizations in Pakistan and it was created with the aim to develop and maintain the capital city.

== Initiatives ==
During 2016, CDA partnered up with Serena Hotels to launch spring tree plantation drive. The launch event was attended by diplomats from various countries, officials from Government and corporate executives.

In 2017, the CDA launched healthy city programme in collaboration with WHO country office in Pakistan. The programme was aimed at addressing inequalities and targeting needs of vulnerable groups.

U Microfinance Bank collaborated with CDA in 2021 to plant one of the largest Miyawaki Forest of Islamabad in Kachnar park. During the campaign, around 6000 trees were planted on 0.61 ha (1.5 acres) of land. The collaboration was aimed at mitigating the devastating effects of deforestation and land degradation in Pakistan. Later on, in another collaboration with Mari Petroleum, largest Miyawaki Forest of the city was launched in sector H-12 of Islamabad. Initially over 20,000 tree saplings were planted with the plantation to continue gradually. The forest is spread over an area of 6.9 ha (17 acres) having various species of plants.

According to a statement issued in March 2022, PTCL Group and the Capital Development Authority (CDA) entered into a strategic partnership to drive the digitalization of services provided by CDA. As per agreement, PTCL will deliver digital solutions to support various sectors within CDA Islamabad, including the administration, Excise and Taxation, and Islamabad Police. The partnership will initially introduce 12 key solutions, such as mobility services, call center setup, video conferencing, cloud services, complaint management systems, street lighting, and fleet management.

In 2023, CDA collaborated with Niaz Support to provide custom wheelchairs to their employees with disabilities and their family members living with disability. In order to address the water shortage problems, CDA officials conducted meetings with WAPDA officials for construction of Dotara Dam and decided to collaborate for this project with the CDA intending to fund the project.

During 2024, Capital Development Authority in collaboration with Pakistan Tobacco Company (PTC) launched "Throw and Grow" initiative to promote the green cover of Margalla hills. In another collaboration, The Embassy of United Arab Emirates (UAE) in Pakistan decided to provide support to CDA in renovating and adding new facilities to one of the parks existing in Islamabad. In another move, CDA joined hands with OGDCL for landscaping and tree plantation drive in the city. The project is expected to improve the aesthetic appeal of Islamabad Expressway while also contributing to better air quality through more plantation.

=== Achievements ===
During an anti-encroachment drive, CDA was able to recover as much as 35 ha (86 acres) of land from land grabbers in sector I-12 of Islamabad. The said land was illegally encroached by Afghan settlers due to which CDA launched a comprehensive campaign to retrieve the encroached land. In another successful move, CDA recovered 17.7 ha (44 acres) of land in sector I-15 of Islamabad after 16 years of illegal occupation by land mafia.

In order to address the water availability issues, CDA established up to 100 rainwater rechargeable wells in different localities of Islamabad. The project is aimed at conservation of rainwater to improve the underground water level in the city. These wells are designed with a filtration system to keep the water safe from pollutants while revitalising the groundwater. As informed by officials of CDA, more than one million gallon of rainwater has been saved from establishing rechargeable wells.

In order to reduce maintenance cost and to adopt energy efficient solutions, CDA replaced 21,000 street light bulbs with LED lights. The lights have been replaced on major roads and avenues in Islamabad.

Over the years, the CDA has also completed some major infrastructure projects aimed at addressing the traffic congestion issue in the city. Some of the major infrastructure projects completed include construction of 7th Avenue at a cost of PKR 900 million, construction of Zero Point Interchange on Islamabad Expressway in year 2011 at a cost of PKR 4.1 Billion, Peshawar Morr Interchange on Srinagar Highway at a cost of PKR 6.5 billion in year 2016, and Rawal Dam chowk flyover on Murree Road at cost of PKR 1.1 billion in year 2022. In another development, CDA inaugurated 7th Avenue interchange in year 2022 built at a cost of PKR 1.7 billion. These infrastructure projects have helped in reducing traffic congestion on major roads and junctions in Islamabad specially during rush hours.

To preserve the history of Islamabad and to promote culture and tourism, CDA developed Saidpur village, more than 300 years old village, into a model village restoring its outlook. The village carries structures of Mandir, Church, and a Gurdwara.

=== CDA Hospital ===
In order to provide medical services to its serving and retired employees along with general public, CDA operates Capital Hospital in Sector G-6 Islamabad. Initially started as day care medical center, the facility was converted into a hospital in year 1981. The hospital houses 250 bed facility and is providing medical care in general surgery, Urology, Eye & ENT, Orthopaedics, and post-operative intensive care among others. The hospital has the distinct privilege of introducing Nuclear Cardiology to Pakistan in 1985 and it also operates hospital based coronary care unit.

Capital Hospital provides free medical treatment to employees of CDA and their families. Non-entitled patients are charged for investigations and in-patient treatment. After construction of several new blocks, the hospital has been converted into a 500-bed facility.

== Responsibilities and services ==
- Planning and Design Wing
  - Architecture Directorate
  - Building Control Directorate
  - Enforcement Directorate
  - Housing Societies Directorate
  - Industrial Planning Directorate
  - Land Survey Division
  - Master Plan Cell
  - Urban Planning Directorate
  - Structure Directorate
  - Traffic Engineering & Transportation Planning
- Administration Wing
  - Capital Hospital
  - HR Directorate
  - CDA Training Academy
  - Labor Relation Directorate
  - Law Directorate
  - Security Directorate
- Environment Protection Cell
  - Environment Directorate
  - Environment Protection Directorate
  - Parks Directorate
  - Sanitation Directorate
  - Wildlife Management Directorate
- Estate Wing
  - Estate Management
  - Land and Rehabilitation Directorate
  - Sector Development Directorate
- Technology Wing
  - IT Directorate
  - One Window Operation Directorate
  - Public Relations Directorate
  - Geospatial Technology Wing
  - Resource Center

== List of Chairmen ==
The Government of Pakistan appoints the CDA chairman through its Establishment Division. As of 2024, the chairman also serves as the Chief Commissioner of Islamabad Capital Territory. According to the CDA Ordinance, the chairman of the board is appointed for four years.

| No. | Name | Tenure start | Tenure end | Tenure | Ref |
|---|---|---|---|---|---|
| 1 | Maj Gen Yahya Khan | 21 June 1960 | 30 November 1961 | 1 year, 162 days | |
| 2 | W.A Sheikh, CSP | 1 December 1961 | 30 April 1965 | 3 years, 150 days | |
| 3 | N.A Farooqi, HQA, CSP | 1 May 1965 | 30 November 1965 | 213 days | |
| 4 | Lt Gen K.M. Sheikh, HI(M) | 30 December 1967 | 15 March 1970 | 2 years, 75 days | |
| 5 | Maj Gen Bashir Ahmed | 16 March 1970 | 27 August 1972 | 2 years, 164 days | |
| 6 | Brigadier Riaz-ul-Haq | 28 August 1972 | 17 May 1973 | 262 days | |
| 7 | M.A Kazmi | 18 May 1973 | 27 July 1979 | 6 years, 70 days | |
| 8 | S.A N. Gardezi | 28 July 1979 | 1 May 1983 | 3 years, 277 days | |
| 9 | Jan Nadir Khan | 2 May 1983 | 1 May 1984 | 365 days | |
| 10 | Mazhar Rafi | 2 May 1984 | 9 May 1989 | 5 years, 7 days | |
| 11 | Syed Munir Hussain | 10 July 1989 | 29 December 1989 | 172 days | |
| 12 | Iqbal Jaffar | 30 December 1989 | 20 August 1990 | 233 days | |
| 13 | F.I Malik | 21 August 1990 | 5 June 1991 | 288 days | |
| 14 | Fareed-ud-Din Ahmad | 6 June 1991 | 20 October 1993 | 2 years, 136 days | |
| 15 | Muhammad Saeed Mahdi | 21 October 1993 | 21 October 1994 | 1 year, 0 days | |
| 16 | Shafi M. Sehwani | 22 October 1994 | 8 October 1995 | 351 days | |
| 17 | Muhammad Zaffar Iqbal | 9 July 1995 | 5 November 1996 | 1 year, 119 days | |
| 18 | M. Javed Masud | 6 November 1996 | 4 May 1998 | 1 year, 179 days | |
| 19 | Ch Qamar Zaman | 5 May 1998 | 26 November 1999 | 1 year, 205 days | |
| 20 | Khalid Saeed | 27 November 1999 | 16 September 2001 | 1 year, 293 days | |
| 21 | Mir Laiq Shah | 17 September 2001 | 1 May 2003 | 1 year, 226 days | |
| 22 | Abdur Rauf Chaudhary | 2 May 2003 | 9 November 2003 | 191 days | |
| 23 | Kamran Lashari | 10 November 2003 | 8 October 2008 | 4 years, 333 days | |
| 24 | Tariq Mahmood Khan | 8 October 2008 | 24 June 2009 | 259 days | |
| 25 | Imtiaz Inayat Ellahi | 24 June 2009 | 9 December 2011 | 2 years, 168 days | |
| 26 | Engr Farkhand Iqbal | 8 December 2011 | 1 October 2012 | 298 days | |
| 27 | Javed Iqbal Awan | 1 October 2012 | 2 October 2012 | 1 day | |
| 28 | Syed Tahir Shahbaz | 2 October 2012 | 16 March 2013 | 165 days | |
| 29 | Nadeem Hassan Asif | 21 June 2013 | 7 December 2013 | 169 days | |
| 30 | Maroof Afzal | 17 December 2013 | 22 August 2016 | 2 years, 249 days | |
| 31 | Hassan Iqbal | 22 August 2016 | 6 September 2016 | 15 days | |
| 32 | Sheikh Ansar Aziz | 6 September 2016 | 29 December 2017 | 1 year, 114 days | |
| 33 | Usman Akhtar Bajwa | 26 January 2018 | 29 June 2018 | 154 days | |
| 34 | Ishrat Ali | 29 June 2018 | 1 September 2018 | 64 days | |
| 35 | Afzal Latif | 1 September 2018 | 17 January 2019 | 138 days | |
| 36 | Amir Ali Ahmed | 17 January 2019 | 22 August 2022 | 3 years, 217 days | |
| 37 | Capt (r) Muhammad Usman Younis | 22 August 2022 | 23 January 2023 | 154 days | |
| 38 | Capt (r) Noorul Amin Mengal | 23 January 2023 | 24 August 2023 | 213 days | |
| 39 | Capt (r) Anwarul Haq | 24 August 2023 | 1 May 2024 | 251 days | |
| 40 | Muhammad Ali Randhawa | 2 May 2024 | 2 April 2026 | 1 year, 335 days | |
| 41 | Lt (r) Sohail Ashraf | 2 April 2026 | Incumbent | 206 days | |

== Controversies ==
Since 2014, the CDA has been targeting and demolishing illegal slums who are largely occupied by Christians in Islamabad. The Supreme Court put on hold the demolitions and ordered from the CDA a written justification to it. The CDA's replied that "most of these katchi abadis [slums] are under the occupation of the Christian community." "It seems this pace of occupation of land by Christian community may increase. Removal of katchi abadies is very urgent to provide [a] better environment to the citizen[s] of Islamabad and to protect the beauty of Islamabad." Various human rights activists condemned the response.

== Dissolution order ==
On 28 June 2025, the Islamabad High Court (IHC) ordered the government to dissolve the Capital Development Authority (CDA) and transfer its powers and assets to the Islamabad Metropolitan Corporation (IMC), after it had said the day earlier that the revenue and tax powers of the CDA were unconstitutional, and were based on the 1960 CDA Ordinance which directly conflicted with several articles of the 2015 ICT Local Government Act.

Justice Mohsin Akhtar Kayani on 27 June said—quoted by Dawn—that "the imposition of direct taxes, ROW charges, or access charges by the CDA under the CDA Ordinance, 1960 based on municipal functions derived from the Municipal Administration Ordinance, 1960 without following the statutory procedure outlined in Sections 88, 89, and 90 of the ICT Local Government Act, 2015, is unlawful." Adding that Statutory Regulatory Orders (SROs) issued by the CDA were "unlawful", and that the capital territory be "administered under a transparent, accountable, and lawful municipal framework, and that the rights of its citizens are duly protected under the law".

== See also ==
- Developments in Islamabad
- Model Town Humak
- Other related government bodies:
  - Cabinet Secretariat Department
  - Islamabad Metropolitan Corporation
  - Islamabad Capital Territory Administration
