= Islamabad =

Capital of Pakistan

Islamabad اسلام آباد
- Federal capital city
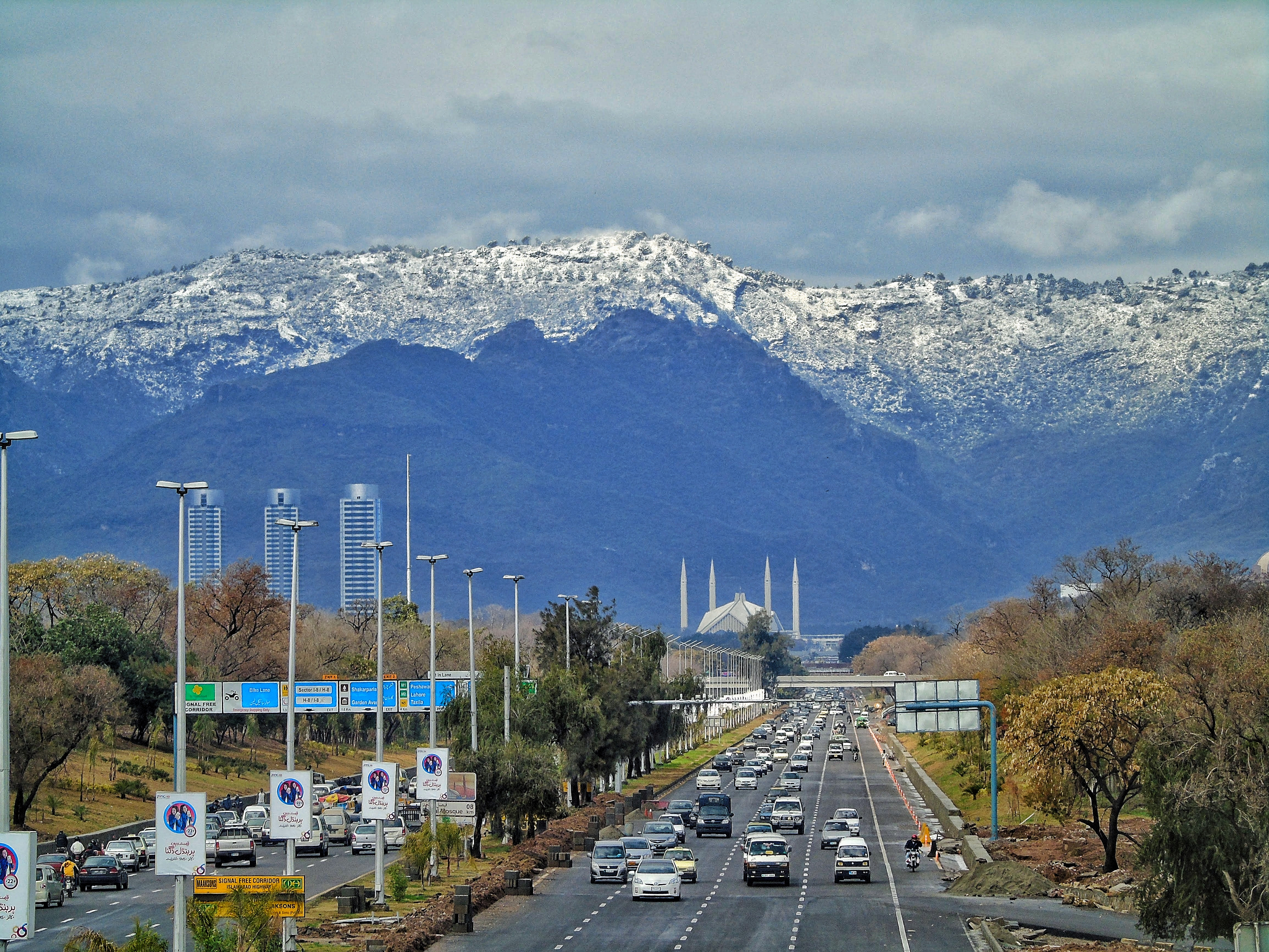
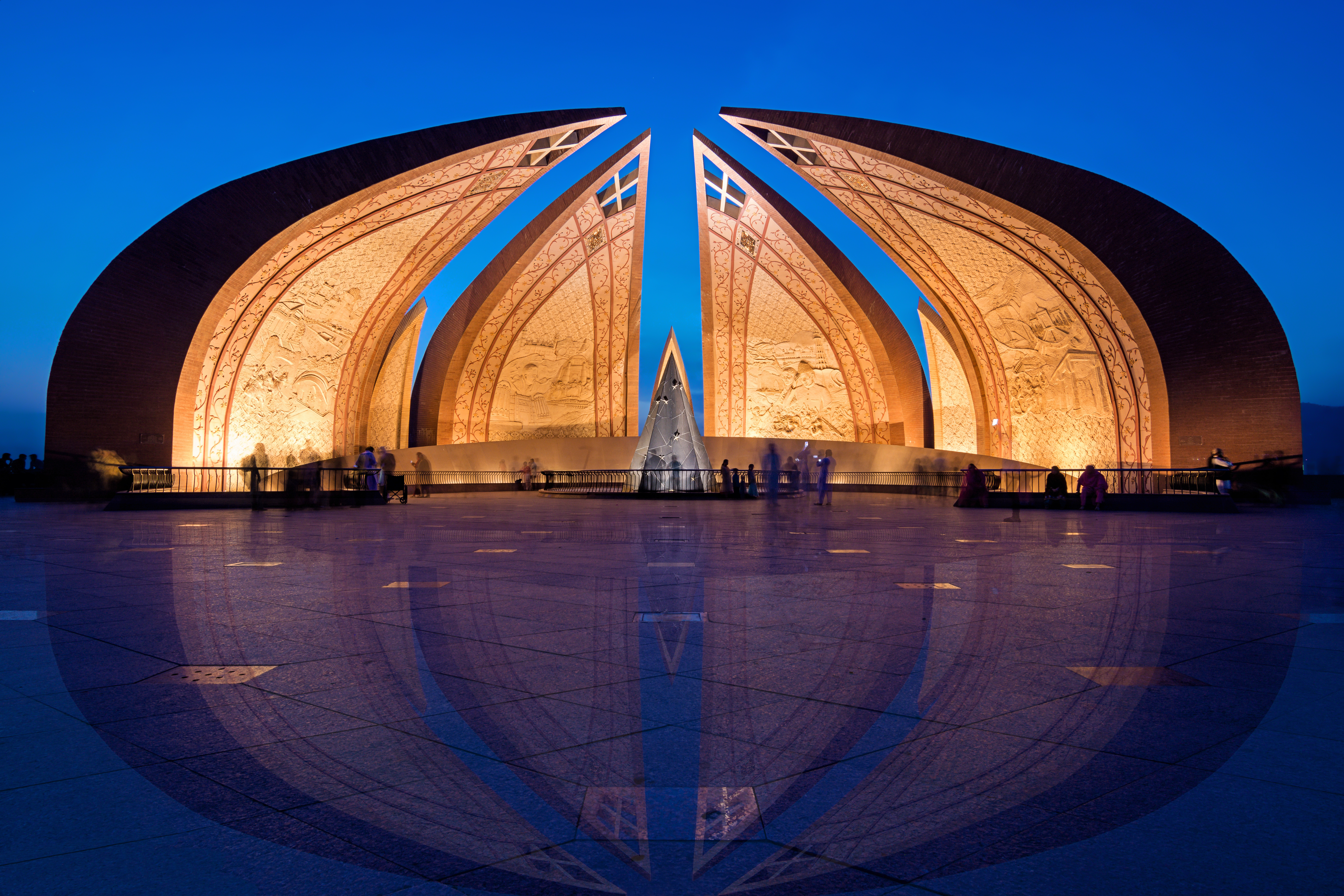
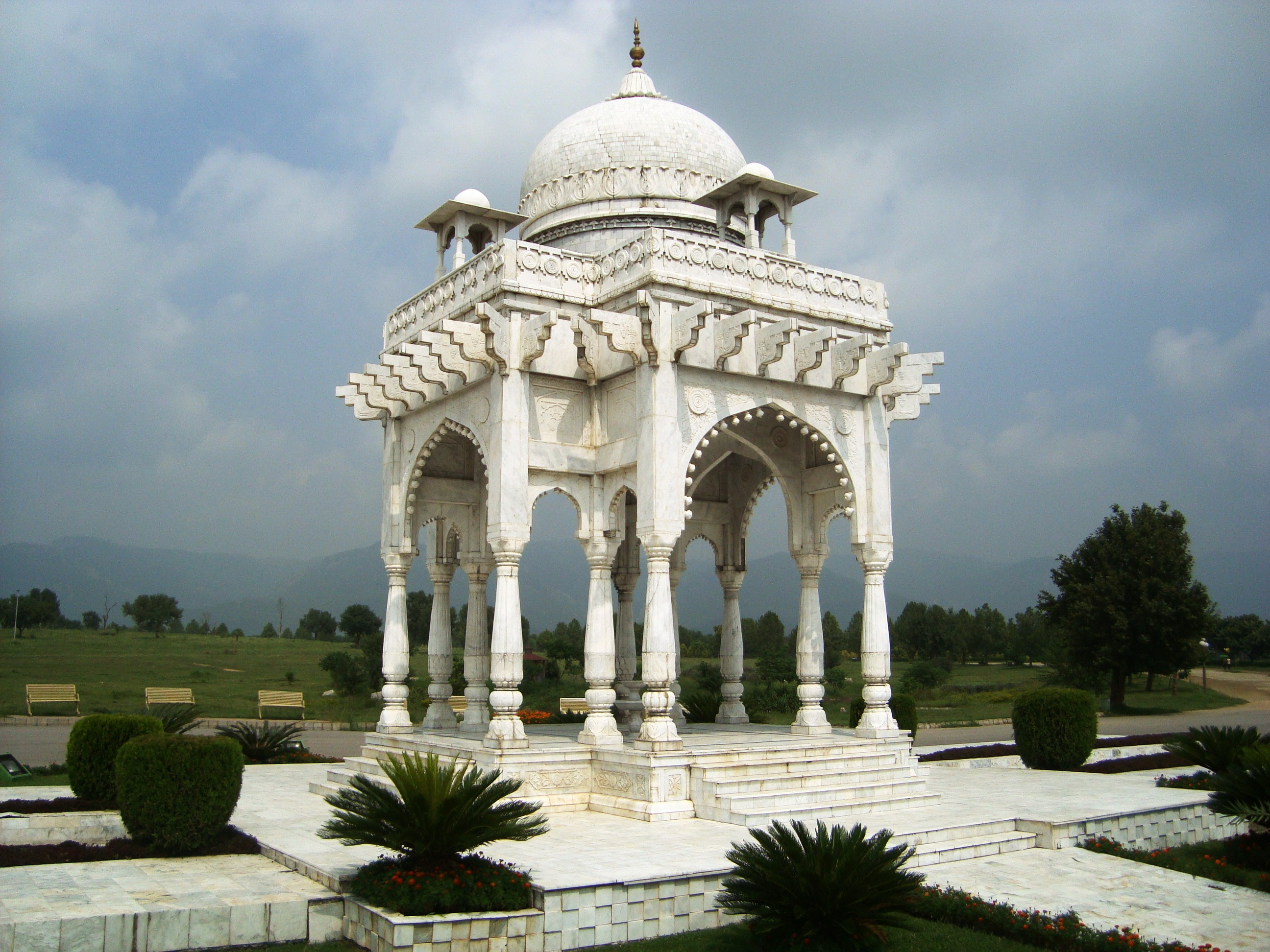
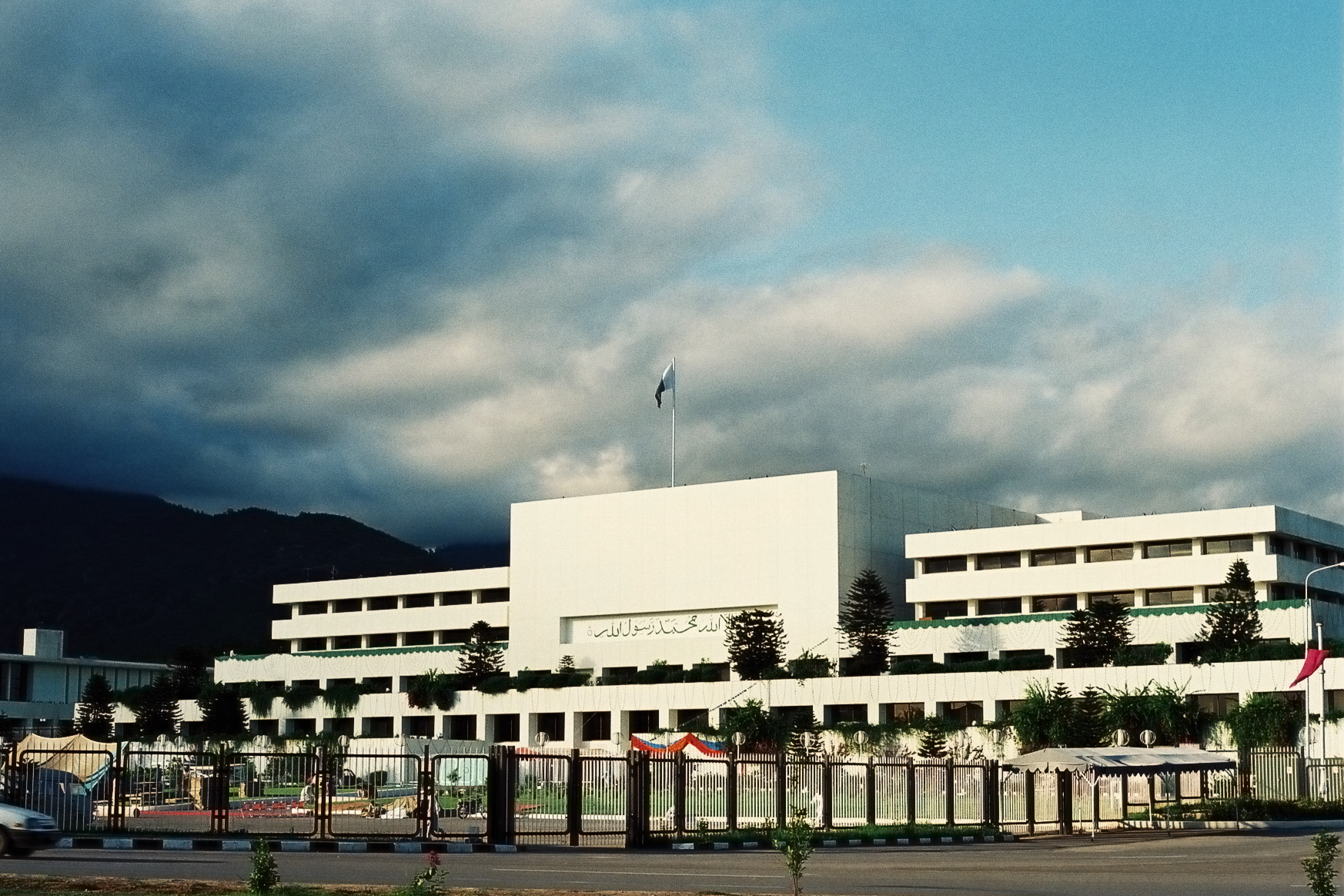
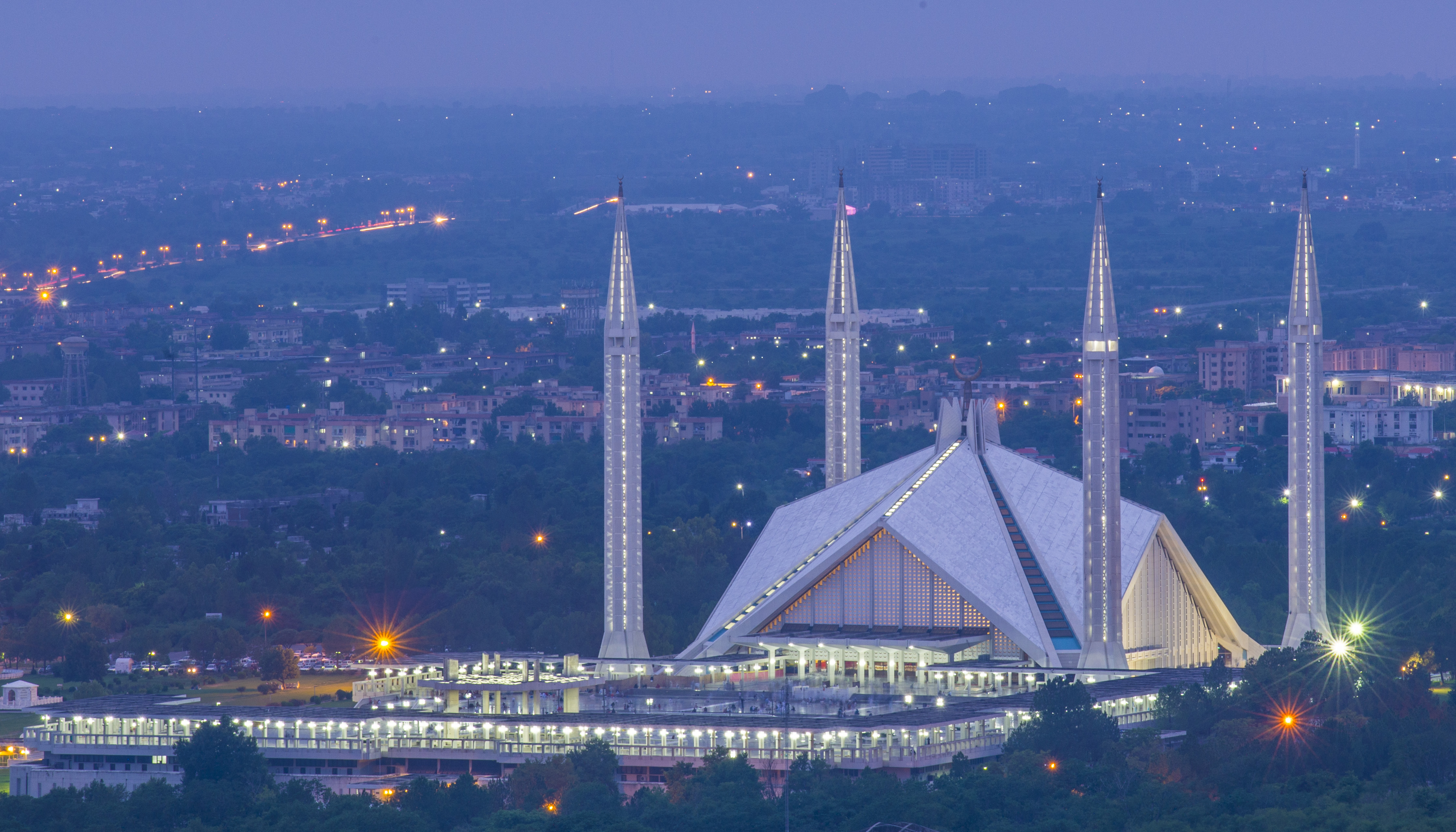
- Islamabad Expressway Pakistan Monument Fatima Jinnah Park Parliament of Pakistan Supreme Court of Pakistan Faisal Mosque

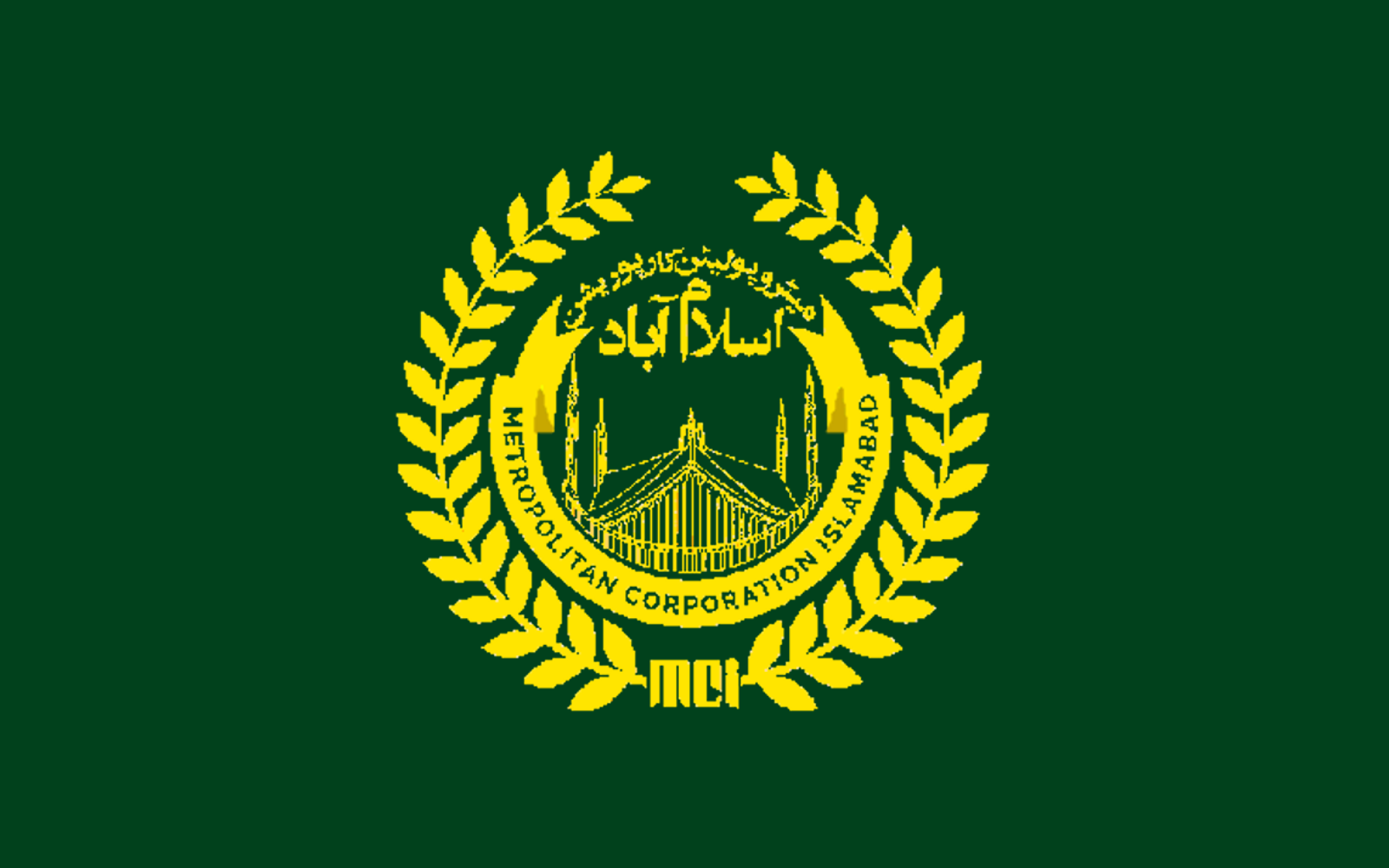
- Flag
- Nicknames: Isloo, The Green City
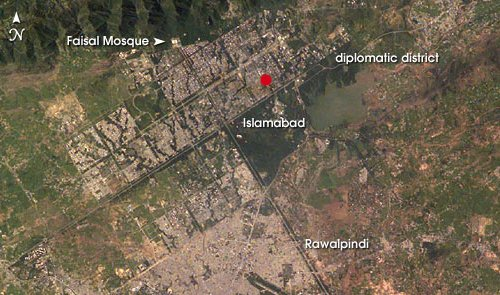
- Satellite Picture of Islamabad

- Location within Pakistan Location within South Asia Location within Asia
- Coordinates: 33°41′35″N 73°03′50″E
- Country: Pakistan
- Administrative unit: Islamabad Capital Territory
- Location approved: 1959; 67 years ago
- Name approved: 24 February 1960; 66 years ago
- Construction started: 1961; 65 years ago
- Inaugurated: 14 August 1967; 59 years ago
- Administrative Areas: 01: Islamabad Tehsil

Government
  - Type: Metropolitan Corporation
  - Body: Capital Development Authority
  - Mayor: None (vacant) (Note: Administrator system was implemented for 6 months before next local bodies election and Deputy Commissioner of Islamabad was given additional charge as administrator in absence of mayor on 28 October 2021.)
  - Constituency: NA-46 Islamabad-I; NA-47 Islamabad-II; NA-48 Islamabad-III
  - Deputy Commissioner: Irfan Nawaz Memon (BPS-19 PAS)

Area
  - City: 220.15 km^{2} (85.00 sq mi)
  - Metro: 906.50 km^{2} (350.00 sq mi)
- Elevation: 666 m (2,185 ft)
- Highest elevation: 1,584 m (5,197 ft)
- Lowest elevation: 417 m (1,368 ft)

Population (2023)
  - City: 1,108,872 (Note: This figure indicates the urban population of the Islamabad Tehsil.)
  - Rank: 10th in Pakistan
  - Density: 5,037/km^{2} (13,050/sq mi)
  - Metro: 2,363,863
  - Metro density: 2,608/km^{2} (6,750/sq mi)
- Time zone: UTC+05:00 (PKT)
- Postcode: 44000
- Area code: 051
- Website: ictadministration.gov.pk

Islamabad (Note: /ɪzˈlɑːməbæd/; Urdu: اسلام‌آباد, romanised: Islāmābād, lit. 'City of Islam', [ɪsˈlɑːmɑːbɑːd]) is the capital city of Pakistan. It is the country's tenth-most populous city with a population of over 1.1 million and is federally administered by the Pakistani government as part of the Islamabad Capital Territory — with a metropolitan population of over 2.3 million. Built as a planned city along the Margalla Hills in the 1960s and established in 1967, Islamabad replaced Karachi as Pakistan's national capital. (Note: Rawalpindi, adjacent to Islamabad, served as the de-facto national capital from 1959 to 1967 while Islamabad was under construction.) It is located in the northern Punjab region, north of the city of Rawalpindi — with which it forms a metropolitan area of over 5.7 million inhabitants. As of 2025, it has a HDI of 0.924. This is the highest HDI of any districts of Pakistan and is comparable to Malta or Japan.

The Greek architect Constantinos Apostolou Doxiadis developed Islamabad's master plan, in which he divided it into eight zones. The city comprises administrative areas, a diplomatic enclave, residential areas, educational and industrial sectors, commercial areas, as well as rural and green areas administered by the Islamabad Metropolitan Corporation with support from the Capital Development Authority. Islamabad is known for its parks and forests, including the Margalla Hills National Park and the Shakarparian. It is home to several landmarks, including the country's flagship Faisal Mosque. Other prominent landmarks include the Pakistan Monument and Democracy Square.

Rated as Gamma+ by the Globalization and World Cities Research Network, Islamabad has one of the highest costs of living in Pakistan. The city's populace is dominated by both middle- and upper-middle-class citizens. Islamabad is home to more than twenty universities, including Bahria University, Quaid-e-Azam University, PIEAS, COMSATS University, FAST-NUCES, and NUST. It is also rated as one of the safest cities in Pakistan and has an expansive RFID-enabled surveillance system with almost 2,000 active CCTV cameras.

== Toponymy ==
The name Islamabad means 'City of Islam'. It is derived from two words: Islam and abad. The Arabic word Islam means 'submission [to God]' as it refers to the religion of Islam, Pakistan's state religion, and the Persian suffix -abad means 'cultivated place', indicating an inhabited place or city. During the course of the early modern period, the name was used in the Mughal era by the emperor Aurangzeb, who named many towns in the Indian subcontinent after it. (Note: "Islāmābād, the name given by the emperor Awrangzīb [q.v.] to several towns in India, for reasons not precisely known... Of these Čittāgong ..., at the head of the Bay of Bengal, is still known occasionally in religious circles as Islāmābād, the official name remaining the original Čittāgong. Mathurā, on the river Yamunā,... was given the name Islāmābād... Amantnāg in the Kashmir valley... also received the name Islāmābād and is still known to the Muslims of the area by this name...The fort of Čākana, near Poona, ...was named Islāmābād after it had been taken by Awrangzīb’s general...") According to a history book by Muhammad Ismail Zabeeh, teacher and poet Qazi Abdur Rehman Amritsari proposed the name of the city.

== History ==
=== Early history ===
Islamabad Capital Territory, located on the Pothohar Plateau of the northern Punjab region, is considered one of the earliest sites of human settlement in Asia. Some of the earliest Stone Age artifacts in the world have been found on the plateau, dating from 100,000 to 500,000 years ago. Rudimentary stones recovered from the terraces of the Soan River testify to the endeavours of early man in the inter-glacial period. Items of pottery and utensils dating back to prehistory have been found.

Excavations by Dr. Abdul Ghafoor Lone reveal evidence of a prehistoric culture in the area. Relics and human skulls have been found dating back to 5000 BCE that, indicating the region was home to Neolithic peoples who settled on the banks of the Soan and who later developed small communities in the region around 3000 BCE.

The Indus Valley civilisation flourished in the region between the 23rd and 18th centuries BCE. Later, the area was an early settlement of the Aryan community, which migrated into the region from Central Asia. Many great armies, such as those of Zahiruddin Babur, Genghis Khan, Timur and Ahmad Shah Durrani, crossed the region during their invasions of the Indian subcontinent. In 2015–16, the Federal Department of Archaeology and Museums, with the financial support of the National Fund for Cultural Heritage, carried out initial archaeological excavations and unearthed the remains of a Buddhist stupa at Ban Faqiran, near the Shah Allah Ditta caves. The stupa was dated to between the 2nd and 4th centuries CE.

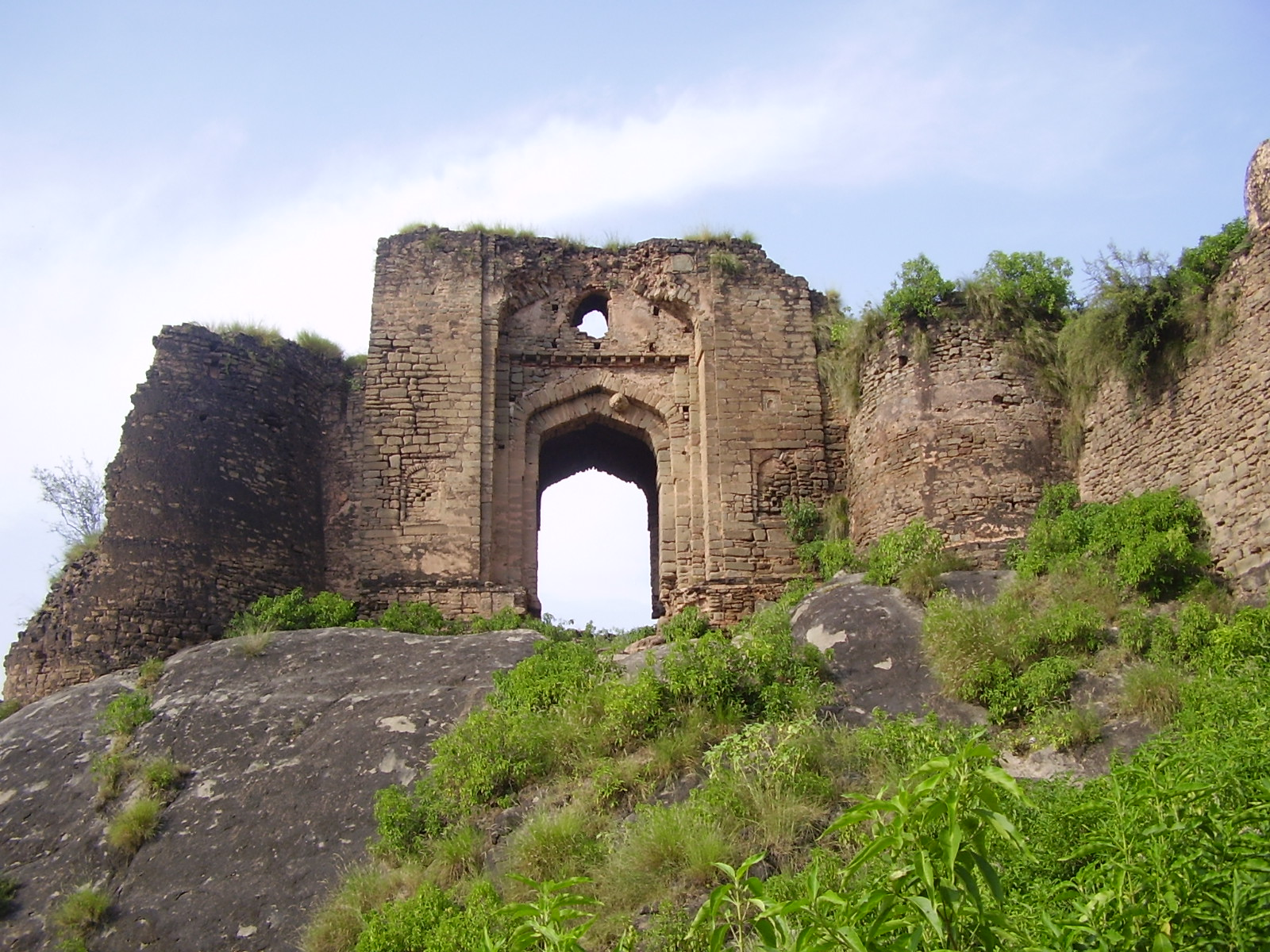
15th-century Pharwala Fort beside the Swaan River

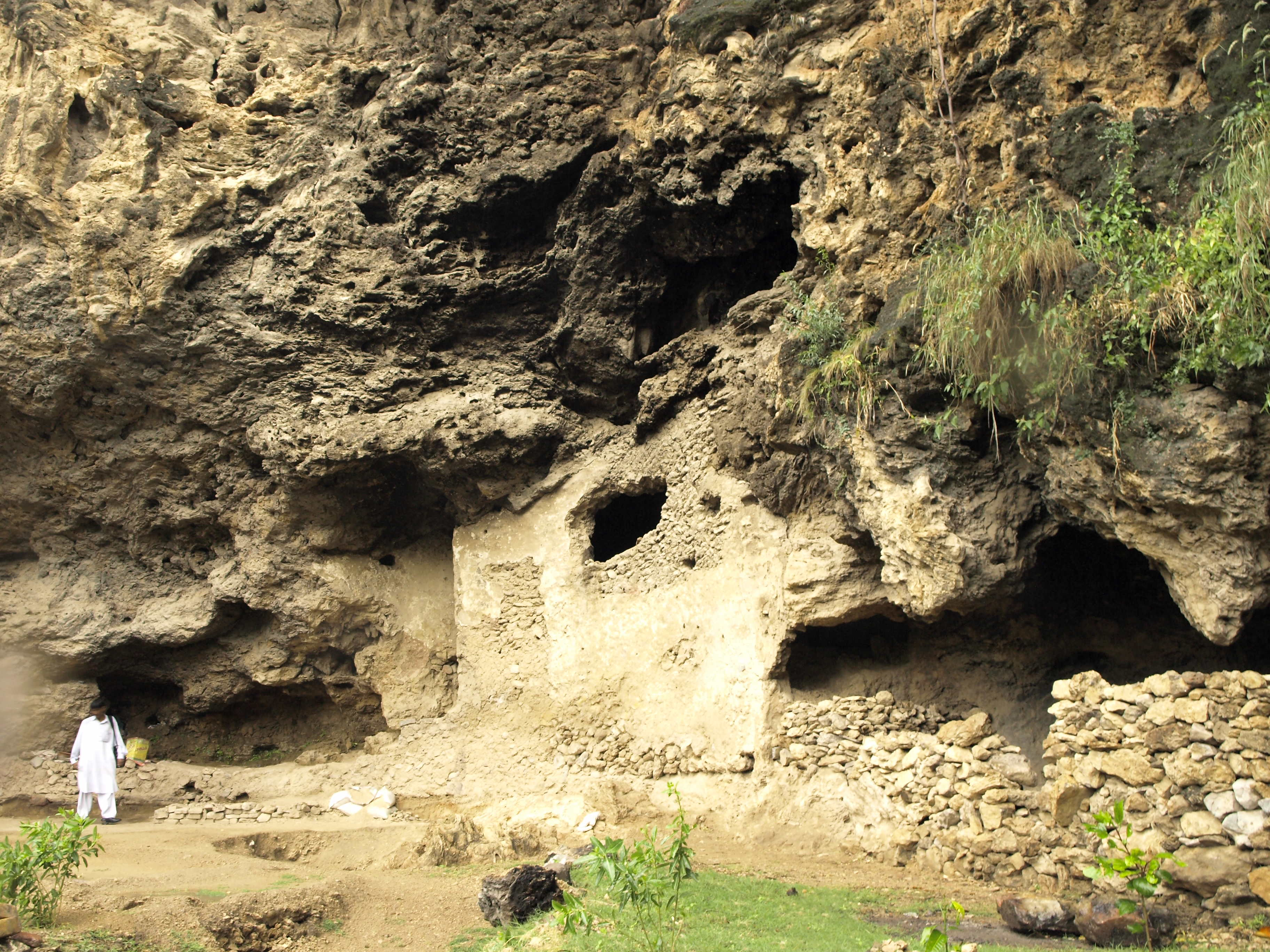
The caves at Shah Allah Ditta, on Islamabad's outskirts, were part of an ancient Buddhist monastic community

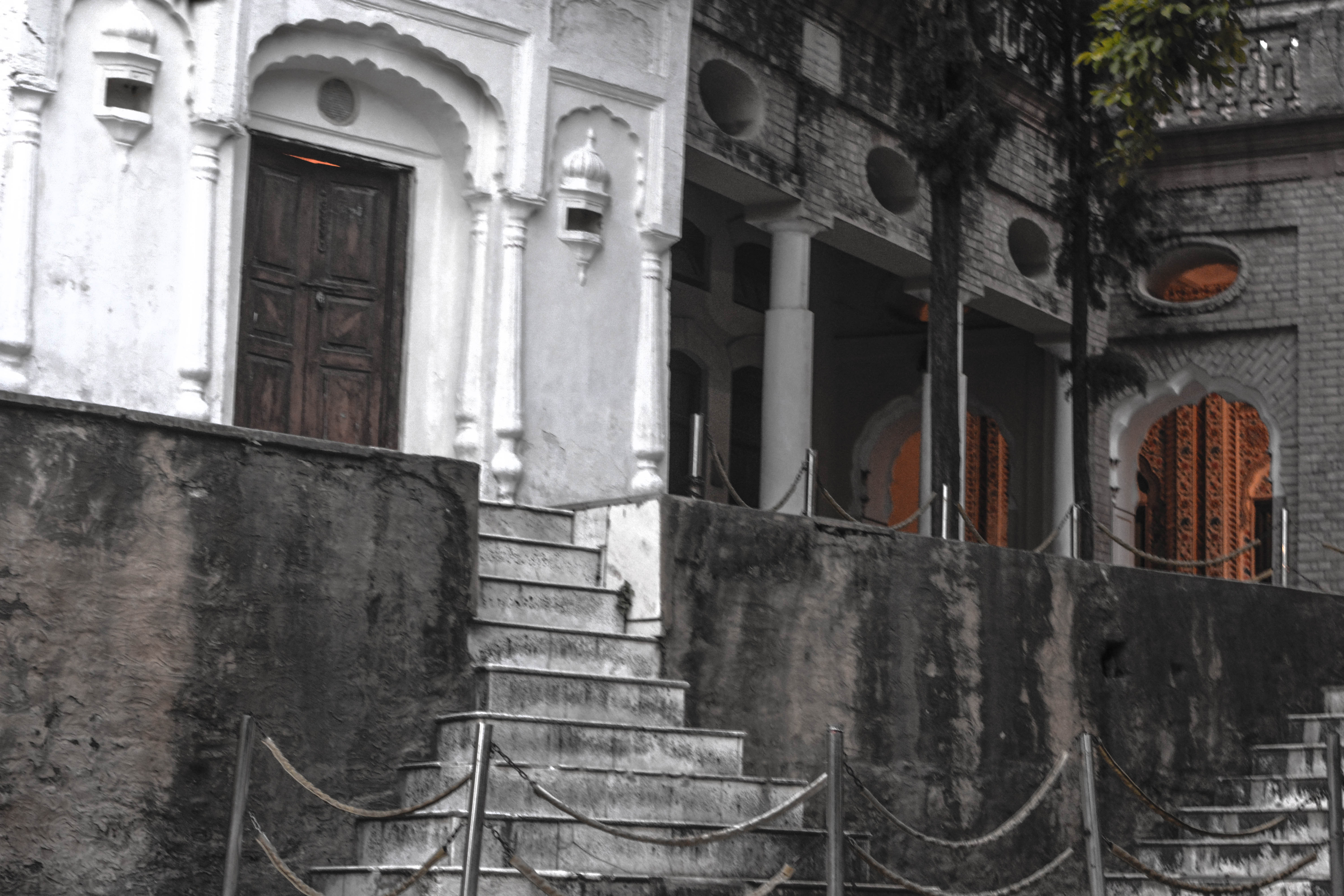
The restored village of Saidpur predates the surrounding city of Islamabad

=== Construction and development ===
When Pakistan gained independence in 1947, the southern port city of Karachi was its provisional national capital. In 1958, a commission was constituted to select a suitable site near Rawalpindi for the national capital, with particular emphasis on location, climate, logistics, and defence requirements, along with other attributes. After extensive study, research, and a thorough review of potential sites, the commission recommended the area northeast of Rawalpindi in 1959 which was used as the provisional capital from that year on. In the 1960s, Islamabad was constructed as a forward capital for several reasons. Karachi was also located at the southern end of the country along the Arabian Sea. Pakistan needed a capital that was easily accessible from all parts of the country. Karachi, a business centre, was also considered unsuitable partly because of the intervention of business interests in government affairs. The newly selected location of Islamabad was closer to the army headquarters in Rawalpindi and the Pakistani-administered sectors of the disputed Kashmir in the north.

A Greek firm of architects, led by Konstantinos Apostolos Doxiadis, designed the master plan of the city based on a grid plan that was triangular in shape, with its apex towards the Margalla Hills. Islamabad was touted by Pakistani legislators as their counterpart to Chandigarh, whose modernism they envied and with which it shares conceptual similarities. The capital was not moved directly from Karachi to Islamabad; it was first shifted temporarily to Rawalpindi in the early 1960s and then to Islamabad when essential development work was completed in 1966.

Islamabad has been a part of Punjab Province ever since, though it is a federally administered capital territory. The latest official political map of Pakistan released in 2020, as well as many older official maps, shows it as part of Punjab Province.

Such world-renowned architects such as Edward Durell Stone and Gio Ponti have been associated with the city's development.

=== Recent history ===
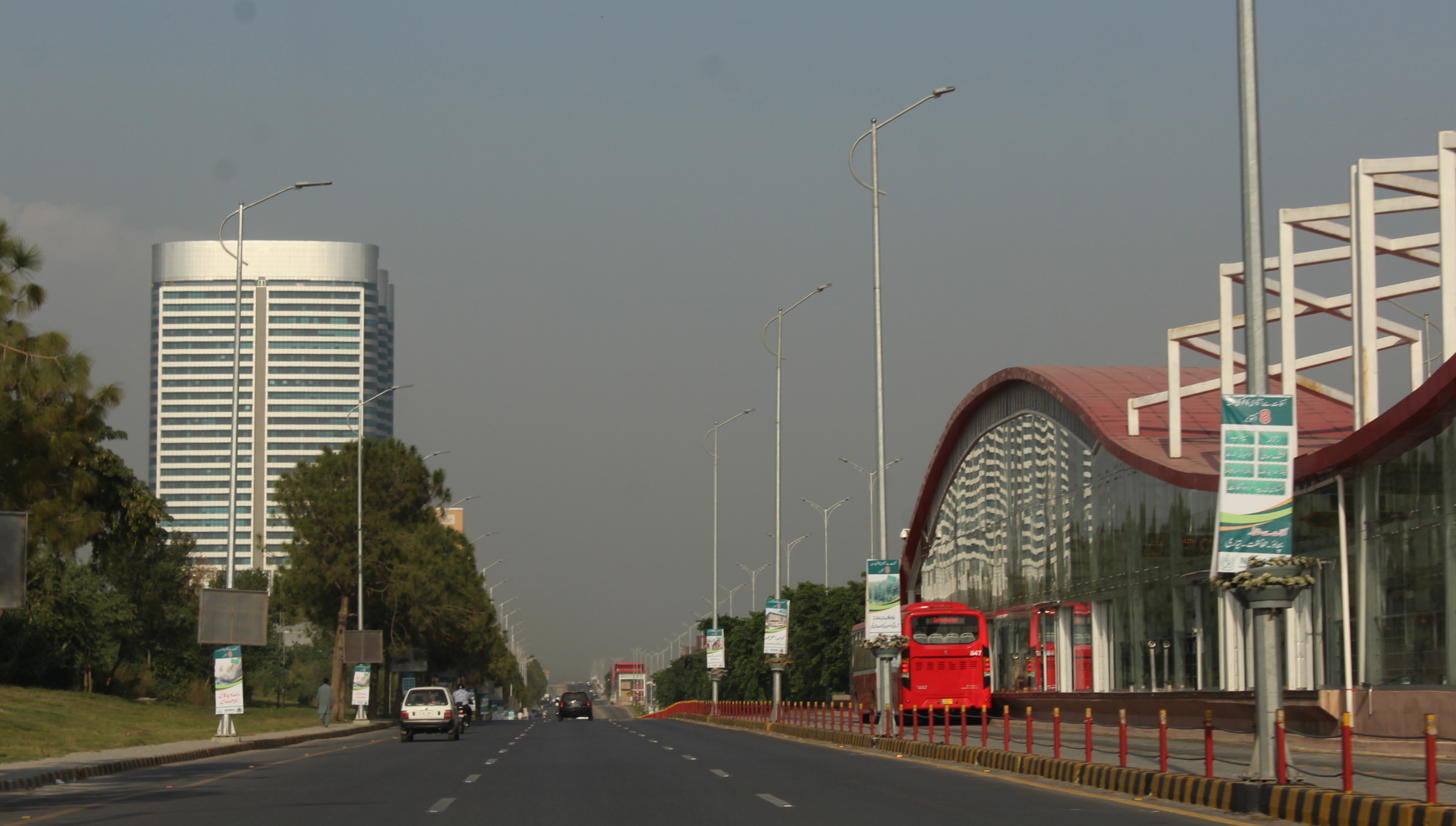
The Rawalpindi-Islamabad Metrobus was built in 2015 to connect Islamabad with neighbouring Rawalpindi.

Islamabad has attracted people from all over Pakistan, making it one of the most cosmopolitan and urbanized cities in the country. As the capital city it has hosted numerous important meetings, such as the South Asian Association for Regional Cooperation summit in 2004.

The city suffered damage from the 2005 Kashmir earthquake, which had a magnitude of 7.6. Islamabad has experienced a series of terrorist incidents, including the July 2007 Siege of Lal Masjid (Red Mosque), the June 2008 Danish embassy bombing, and the September 2008 Marriott bombing. In 2011, four terrorist incidents occurred in the city, killing four people, including the murder of Punjab Governor Salmaan Taseer.

The construction of the Rawalpindi-Islamabad Metrobus, the region's first mass transit line, began in February 2014 and was completed in March 2015. The Rawalpindi Development Authority built the project at a cost of approximately Rs. 24 billion, which was shared by both the federal government and the provincial government of Punjab.

== Geography ==
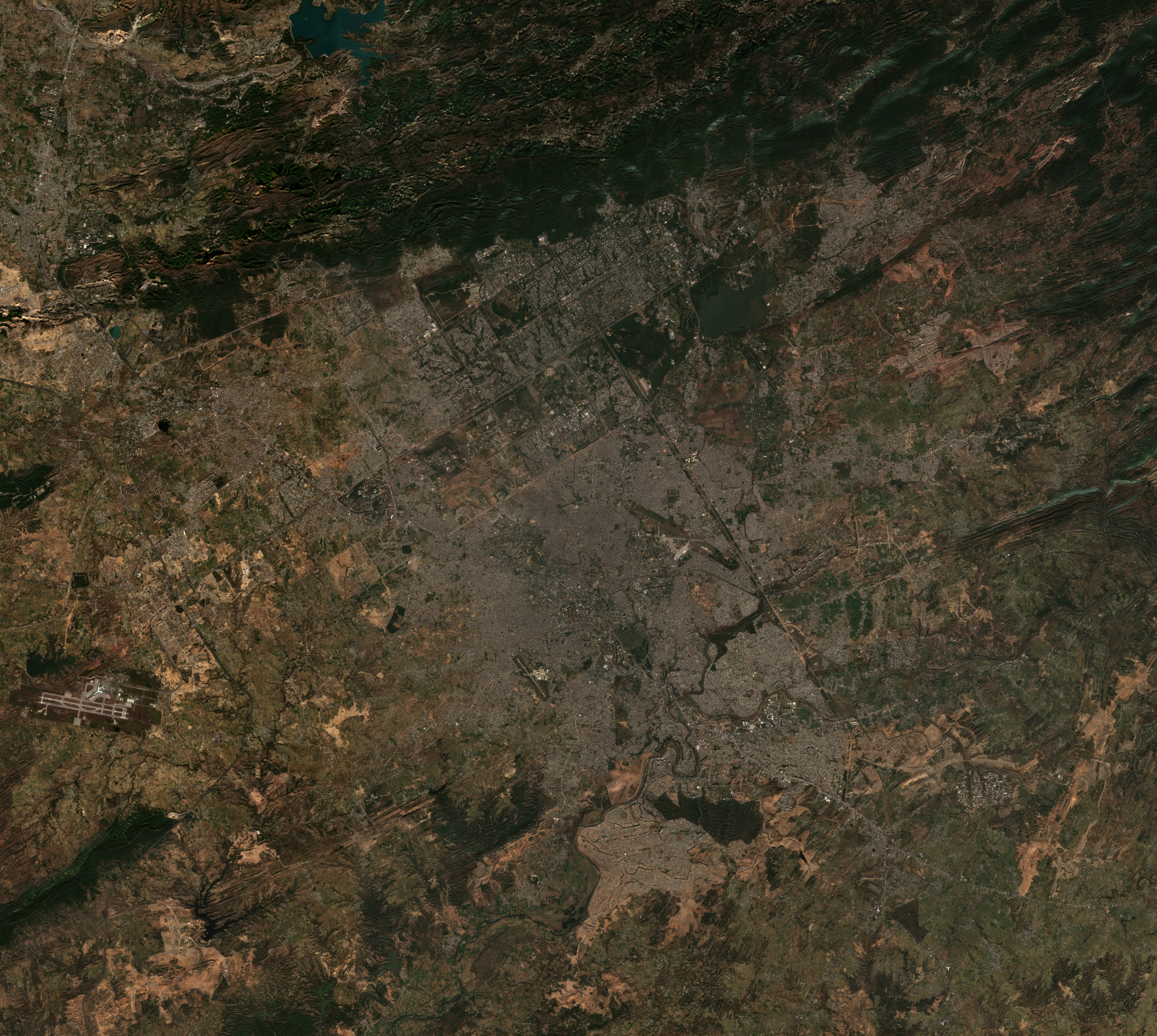
Satellite view of Islamabad-Rawalpindi Metropolitan Area with Margalla Hills in the north.

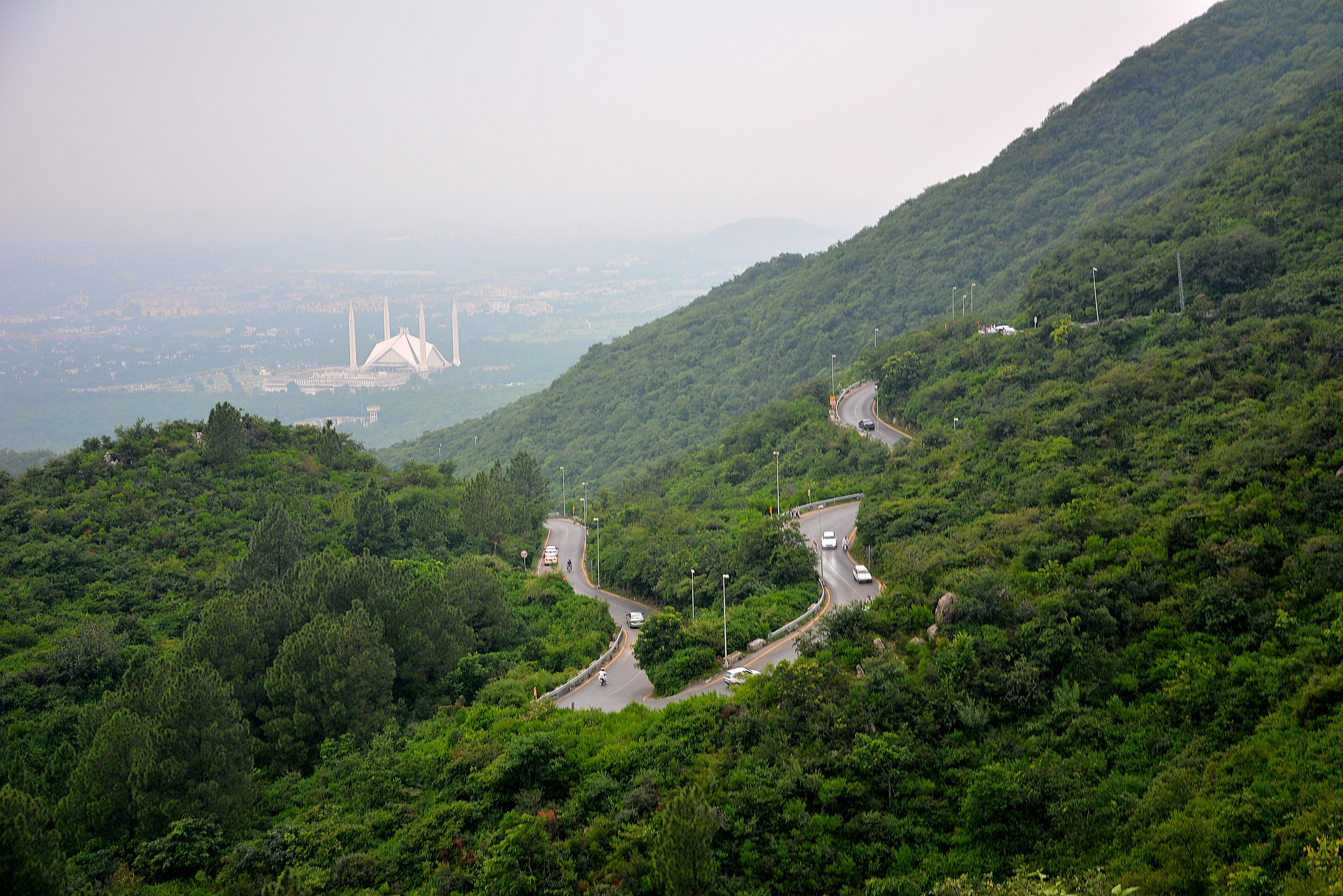
Margalla Hills, Islamabad

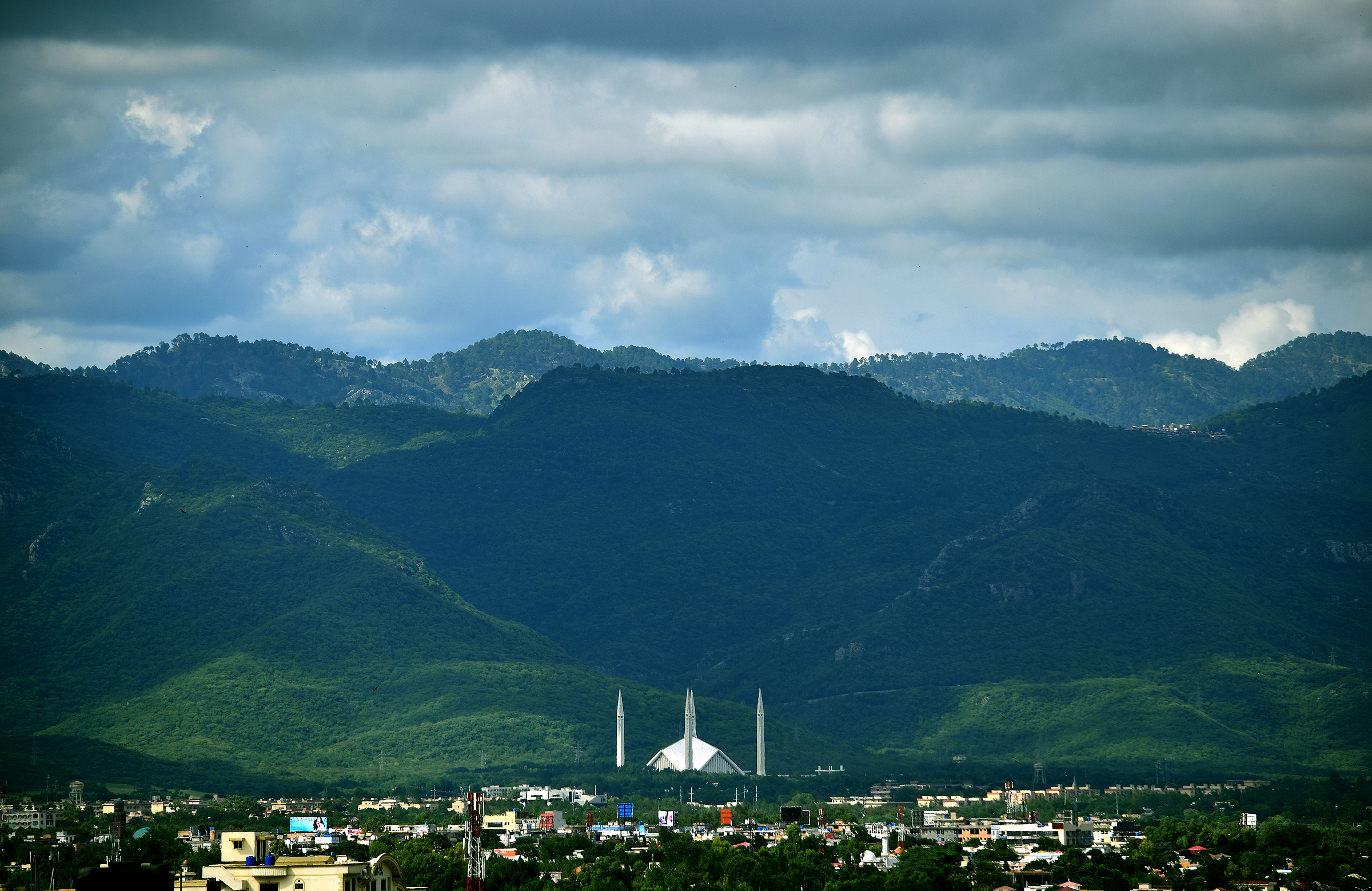
Islamabad's verdant cityscape merges with the Margalla Hills

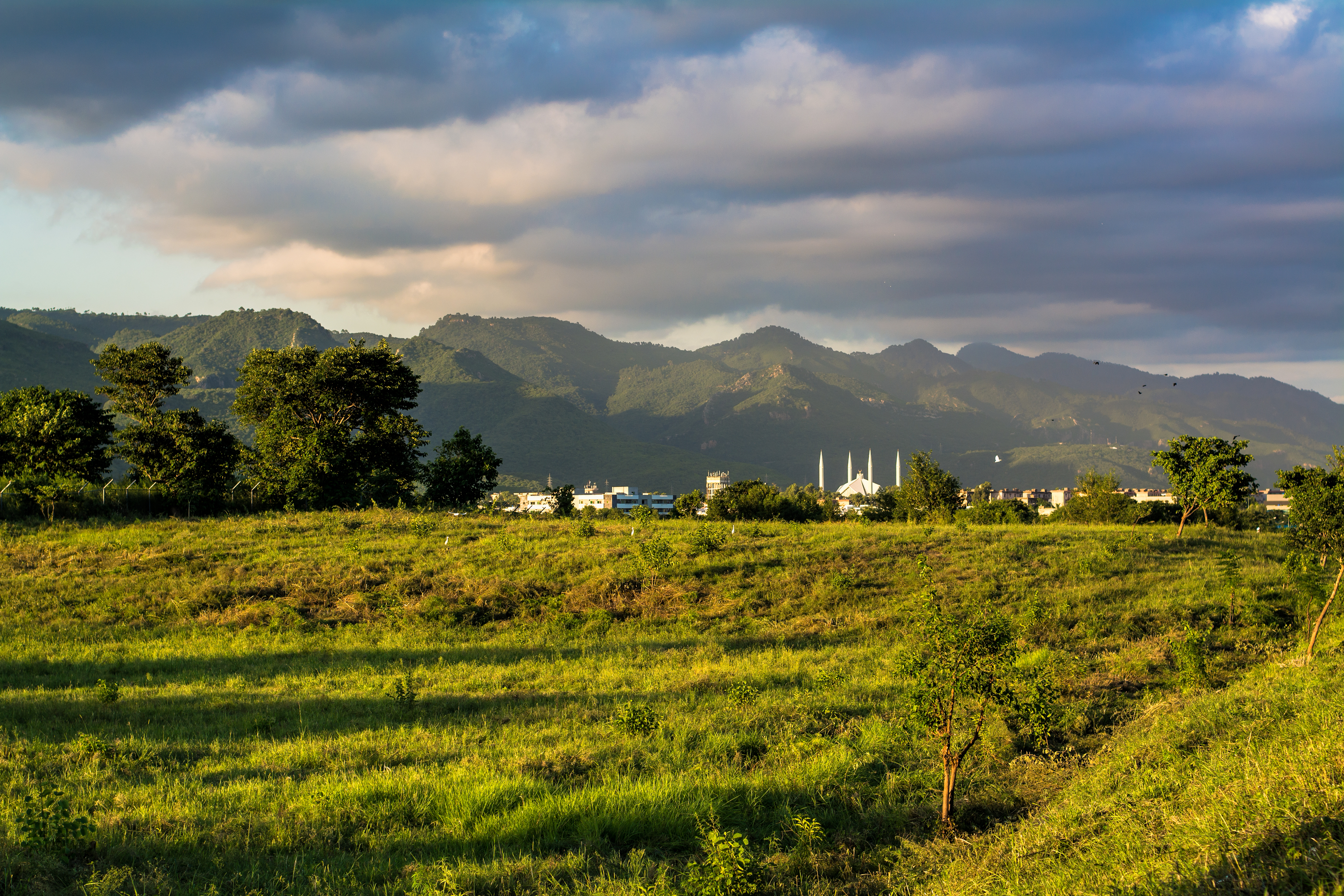
Islamabad's lush landscape

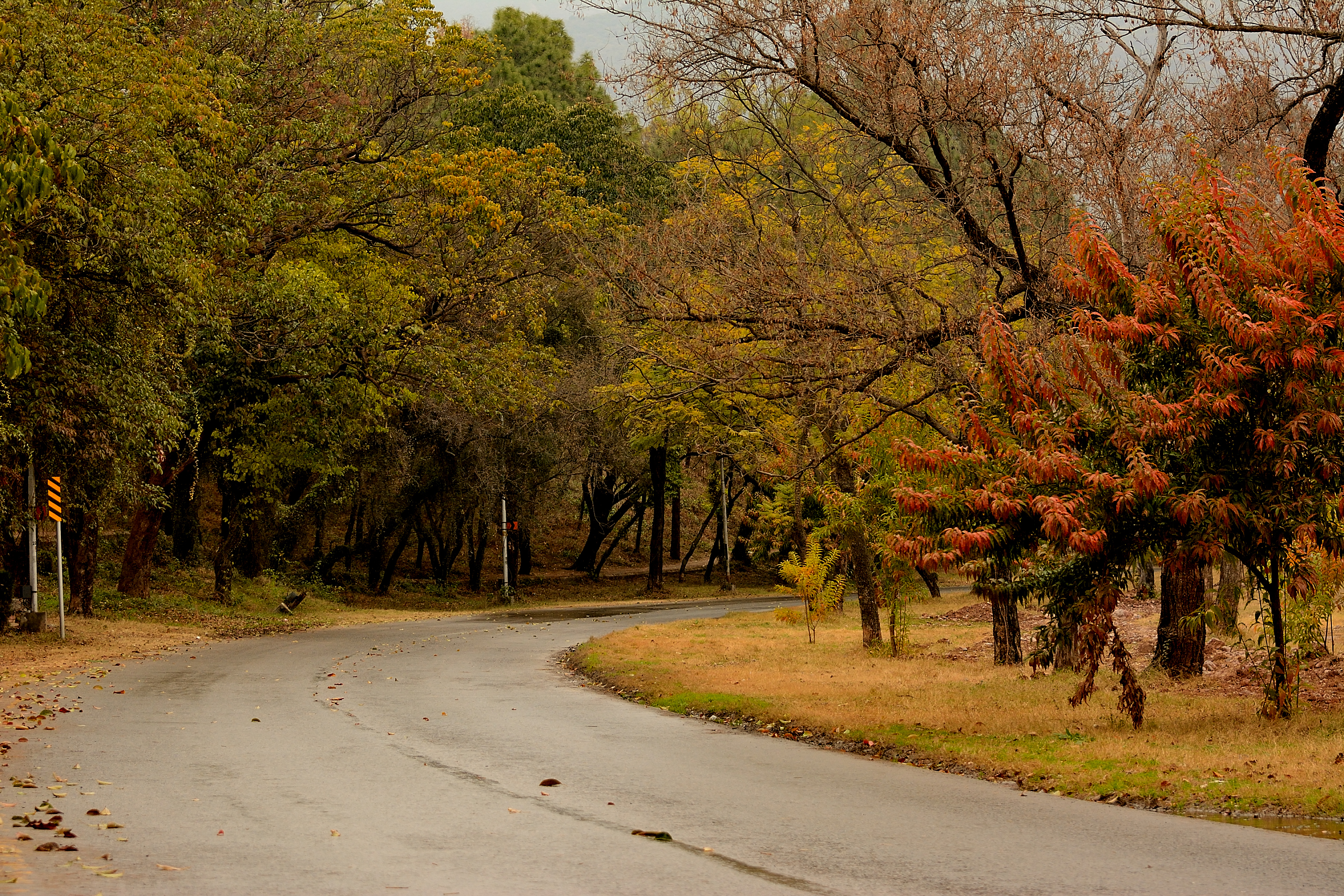
Islamabad's deciduous trees change colours in autumn

Islamabad lies about 540 metres (1,770 ft) above sea level at the northern edge of the Pothohar Plateau and at the foot of the Margalla Hills in Islamabad Capital Territory. The modern capital and the ancient Gakhar city of Rawalpindi form a conurbation and are commonly referred to as the Twin Cities.

To the northeast of the city lies the colonial–era hill station of Murree, and to the north lies the Haripur District of Khyber Pakhtunkhwa. Kahuta lies to the southeast, Taxila, Wah Cantt, and Attock District to the northwest, Gujar Khan, Rawat, and Mandrah on the southeast, and the metropolis of Rawalpindi to the south and southwest. Islamabad is located 120 kilometres (75 mi) southwest of Muzaffarabad, 185 kilometres (115 mi) east of Peshawar and 295 kilometres (183 mi) northwest of Lahore.

Islamabad covers an area of 906 square kilometres (350 sq mi). A further 2,717 square kilometres (1,049 sq mi) area is known as the Specified Area, with the Margala Hills in the north and northeast. The southern portion of the city is an undulating plain. It is drained by the Kurang River, on which the Rawal Dam is located.

=== Climate ===
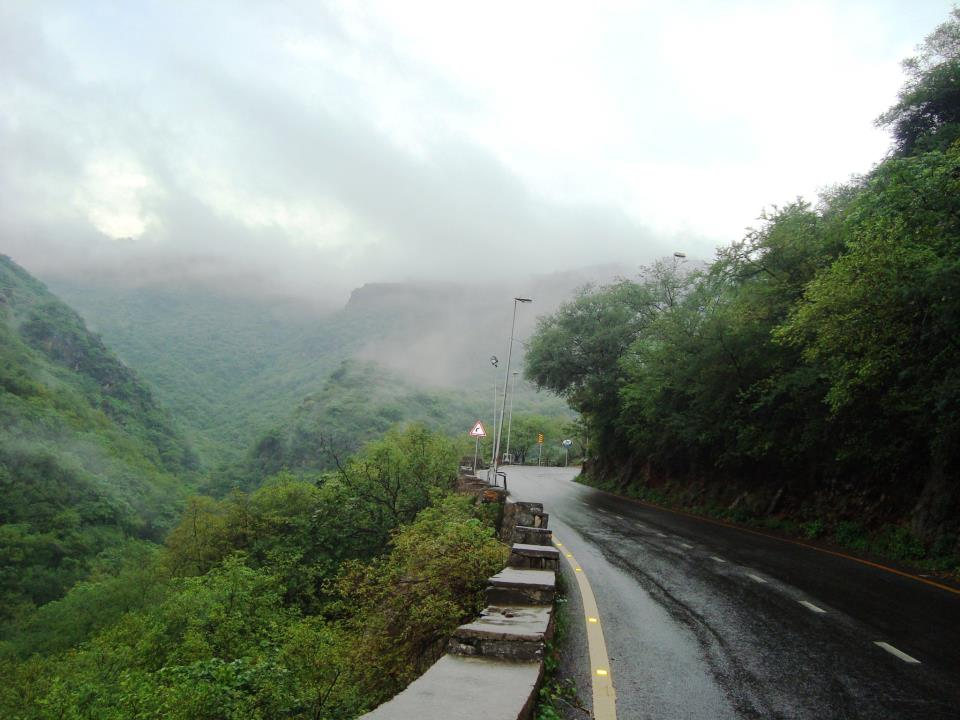
Islamabad's annual precipitation allows for the growth of lush forests in the city's hills.

Islamabad has a humid subtropical climate (Köppen: Cwa), with five seasons: Winter (November–February), Spring (March and April), Summer (May and June), Rainy Monsoon (July and August) and Autumn (September and October). The hottest month is June, where average highs routinely exceed 38 °C (100.4 °F). The wettest month is July, with heavy rainfalls and evening thunderstorms with the possibility of cloudburst and flooding. The coolest month is January.

Islamabad's micro-climate is regulated by three artificial reservoirs: Rawal, Simli, and Khanpur Dam. The latter is located on the Haro River near the town of Khanpur, about 40 kilometres (25 mi) from Islamabad. Simli Dam is 30 kilometres (19 mi) north of Islamabad. 220 acres (89 ha) of the city consists of Margalla Hills National Park. Loi Bher Forest is situated along the Islamabad Highway, covering an area of 1,087 acres (440 ha). The highest monthly rainfall of 743.3 mm (29.26 in) was recorded during July 1995. Winters generally feature dense fog in the mornings and sunny afternoons. In the city, temperatures stay mild, with snowfall over the higher-elevation points on nearby hill stations, notably Murree and Nathia Gali. The temperatures range from 13 °C (55 °F) in January to 38 °C (100 °F) in June. The highest recorded temperature was 46.6 °C (115.9 °F) on 23 June 2005 while the lowest temperature was −6.0 °C (21.2 °F) on 17 January 1967. Light snowfall sometimes happens on the peaks of the hills visible from the city, though this is rare. Snowfall does not occur in the city itself. On 23 July 2001, Islamabad received a record-breaking 620 mm (24 in) of rainfall in just 10 hours. It was the heaviest rainfall in Islamabad in the past 100 years and the highest rainfall in 24 hours as well. Water supply is strained, leading to project proposals like the Ghazi Barotha water supply project.

Climate data for Islamabad (1991–2020 normals)
| Month | Jan | Feb | Mar | Apr | May | Jun | Jul | Aug | Sep | Oct | Nov | Dec | Year |
|---|---|---|---|---|---|---|---|---|---|---|---|---|---|
| Record high °C (°F) | 30.1 (86.2) | 30.0 (86.0) | 37.0 (98.6) | 44.0 (111.2) | 45.6 (114.1) | 46.6 (115.9) | 45.0 (113.0) | 42.0 (107.6) | 38.1 (100.6) | 38.0 (100.4) | 32.2 (90.0) | 28.3 (82.9) | 46.6 (115.9) |
| Mean daily maximum °C (°F) | 17.7 (63.9) | 20.0 (68.0) | 24.8 (76.6) | 30.6 (87.1) | 36.1 (97.0) | 38.3 (100.9) | 35.4 (95.7) | 33.9 (93.0) | 33.4 (92.1) | 30.9 (87.6) | 25.4 (77.7) | 20.4 (68.7) | 28.9 (84.0) |
| Daily mean °C (°F) | 10.7 (51.3) | 13.4 (56.1) | 18.1 (64.6) | 23.6 (74.5) | 28.7 (83.7) | 31.4 (88.5) | 30.1 (86.2) | 29.1 (84.4) | 27.6 (81.7) | 23.3 (73.9) | 17.3 (63.1) | 12.5 (54.5) | 22.2 (72.0) |
| Mean daily minimum °C (°F) | 3.6 (38.5) | 6.8 (44.2) | 11.4 (52.5) | 16.6 (61.9) | 21.5 (70.7) | 24.5 (76.1) | 24.9 (76.8) | 24.2 (75.6) | 21.7 (71.1) | 15.6 (60.1) | 9.1 (48.4) | 4.7 (40.5) | 15.4 (59.7) |
| Record low °C (°F) | −6 (21) | −5.0 (23.0) | −3.8 (25.2) | 2.1 (35.8) | 5.5 (41.9) | 13.0 (55.4) | 15.2 (59.4) | 14.5 (58.1) | 13.3 (55.9) | 5.7 (42.3) | −0.6 (30.9) | −2.8 (27.0) | −6.0 (21.2) |
| Average precipitation mm (inches) | 55.2 (2.17) | 93.4 (3.68) | 95.2 (3.75) | 58.1 (2.29) | 39.9 (1.57) | 78.4 (3.09) | 310.6 (12.23) | 317.0 (12.48) | 135.4 (5.33) | 34.4 (1.35) | 17.7 (0.70) | 25.9 (1.02) | 1,261.2 (49.65) |
| Average precipitation days (≥ 1.0 mm) | 4.7 | 6.3 | 7.3 | 6.1 | 5.2 | 6.0 | 12.3 | 11.9 | 6.4 | 2.9 | 2.0 | 2.0 | 73.1 |
| Average relative humidity (%) | 67 | 63 | 62 | 52 | 42 | 44 | 68 | 76 | 67 | 62 | 63 | 66 | 61 |
| Mean monthly sunshine hours | 195.7 | 187.1 | 202.3 | 252.4 | 319.0 | 300.1 | 264.4 | 250.7 | 262.2 | 275.5 | 247.9 | 195.6 | 2,952.9 |
| Mean daily sunshine hours | 6.3 | 6.6 | 6.5 | 8.4 | 10.1 | 10.0 | 8.5 | 8.1 | 8.7 | 8.9 | 8.3 | 6.3 | 8.1 |
Source 1: NOAA (sun, 1961-1990), Deutscher Wetterdienst (humidity 1973-1990, daily sun 1961-1990)
Source 2: PMD (extremes)

== Cityscape ==
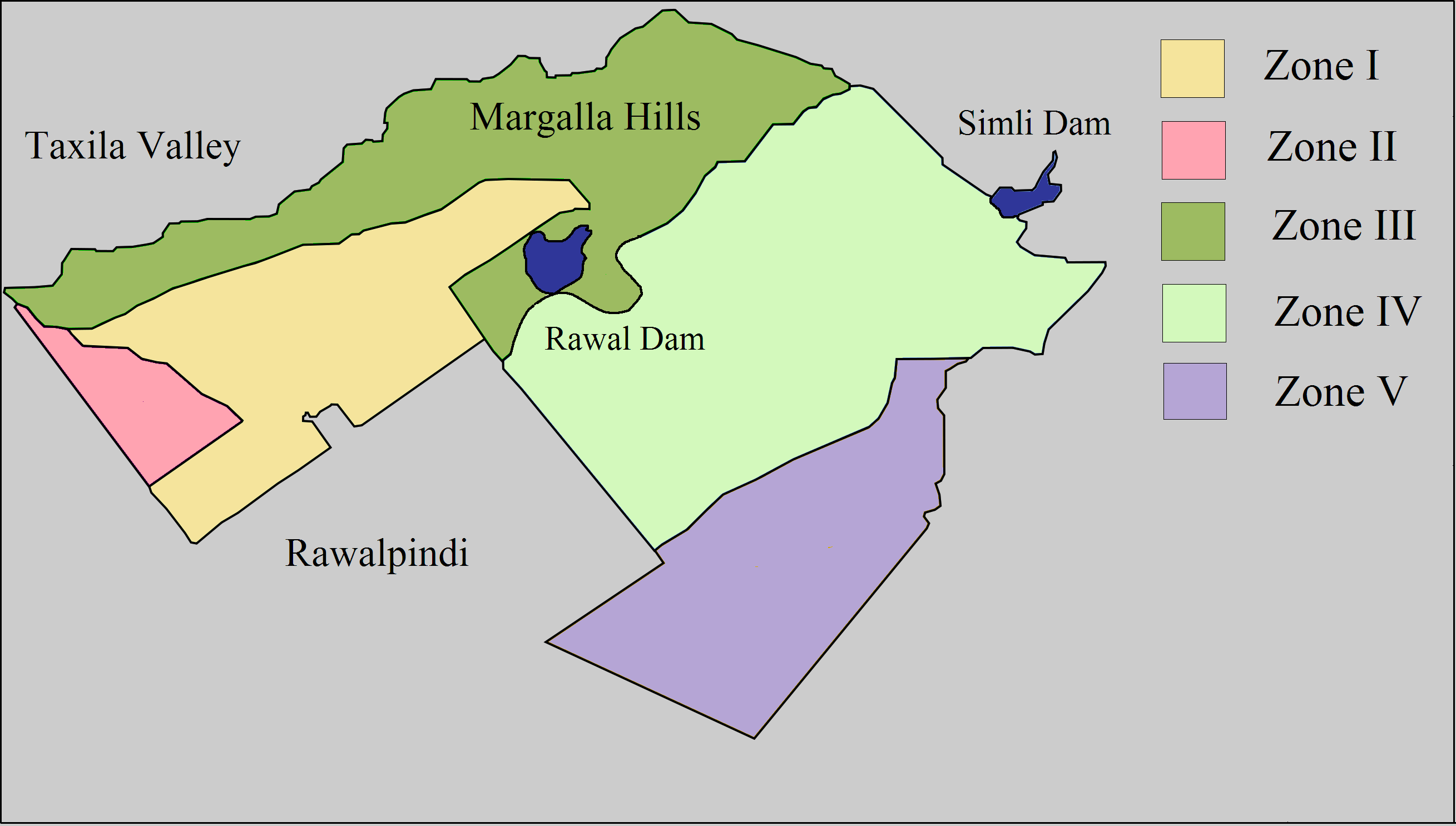
Islamabad Zones

=== Civil administration ===
The Islamabad Capital Territory (ICT) Administration, generally known as ICT Administration, is the civil administration as well as main law and order agency of the federal capital.

The local government authority of the city is the Islamabad Metropolitan Corporation (IMC) with some help from Capital Development Authority (CDA), which oversees the planning, development, construction, and administration of the city. Islamabad Capital Territory is divided into eight zones: Administrative Zone, Commercial District, Educational Sector, Industrial Sector, Diplomatic Enclave, Residential Areas, Rural Areas and Green Area. Islamabad city is divided into five major zones: Zone I, Zone II, Zone III, Zone IV, and Zone V. Out of these, Zone IV is the largest in area. Zone I consists mainly of all the developed residential sectors while Zone II consists of the under-developed residential sectors. Each residential sector is identified by a letter of the alphabet and a number, and covers an area of approximately 2 km × 2 km (1 1/4 mi × 1 1/4 mi). The sectors are lettered from A to I, and each sector is divided into four numbered sub-sectors.

Zones in Islamabad
| Zone | Area |
| Zone | acres | km^{2} |
|---|---|---|
| I | 54,958.25 | 222.4081 |
| II | 9,804.92 | 39.6791 |
| III | 50,393.01 | 203.9333 |
| IV | 69,814.35 | 282.5287 |
| V | 39,029.45 | 157.9466 |
| Source: | Lahore Real Estate |

=== Sectors ===
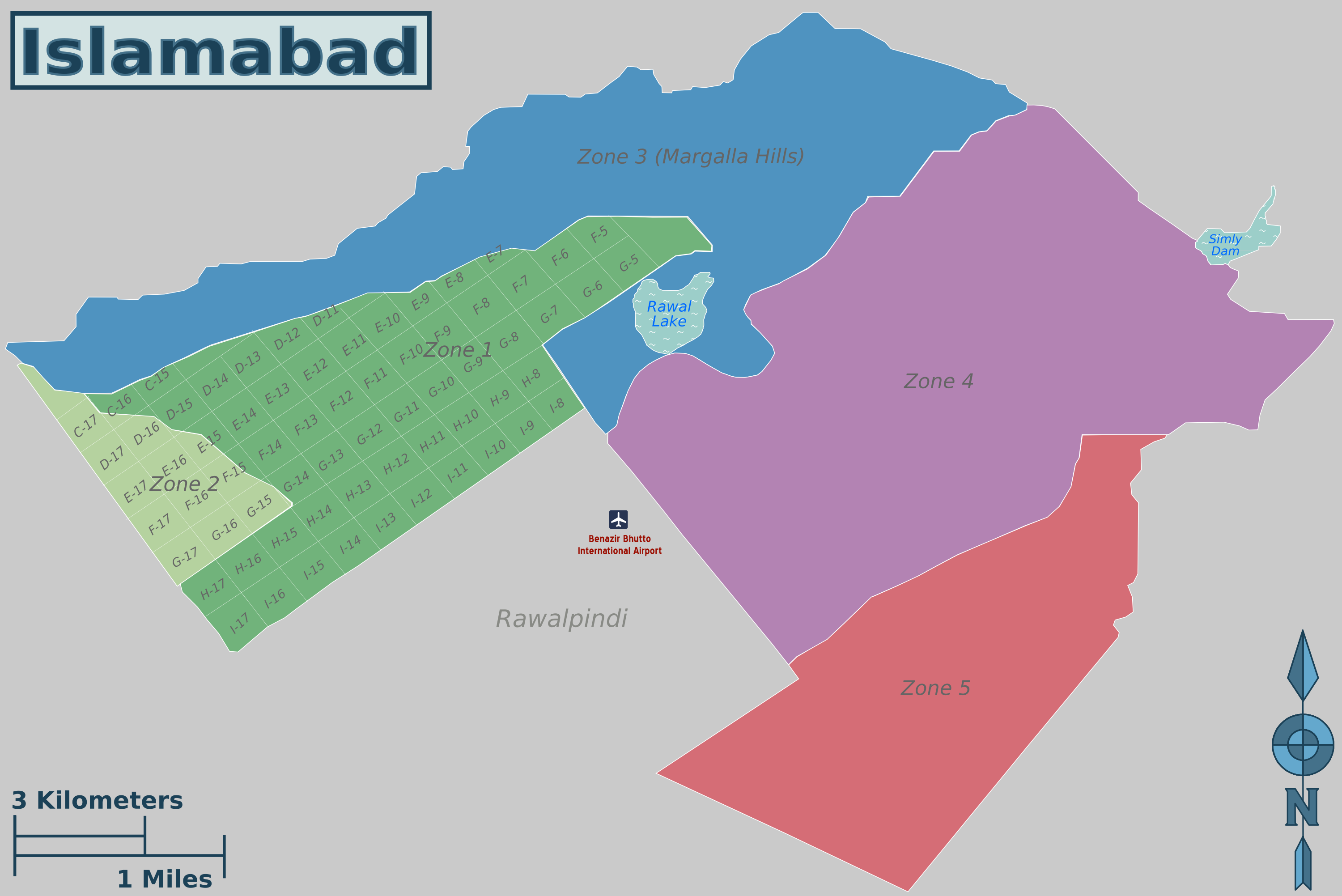
The five zones and sectors of Islamabad

Series A, B, and C are still underdeveloped. The D series has seven sectors (D-11 to D-17), of which only sector D-12 is completely developed. This series is located at the foot of Margalla Hills. The E Sectors are named from E-7 to E-17. Many foreigners and diplomatic personnel are housed in these sectors. In the revised Master Plan of the city, CDA has decided to develop a park on the pattern of Fatima Jinnah Park in sector E-14. Sectors E-8 and E-9 contain the campuses of Bahria University, Air University, and the National Defence University. The F and G series contains the most developed sectors. F series contains sectors F-5 to F-17; some sectors are still under-developed. F-5 is an important sector for the software industry in Islamabad, as the two software technology parks are located here. The entire F-9 sector is covered with Fatima Jinnah Park. The Centaurus complex is a major landmark of the F-8 sector. G sectors are numbered G-5 through G-17. Some important places include the Jinnah Convention Centre and Serena Hotel in G-5, the Lal Masjid in G-6, the Pakistan Institute of Medical Sciences, the largest medical complex in the capital, located in G-8, and the Karachi Company shopping centre in G-9.

The H sectors are numbered H-8 through H-17. The H sectors are mostly dedicated to educational and health institutions. National University of Sciences and Technology covers a major portion of sector H-12. The I sectors are numbered from I-8 to I-18. With the exception of I-8, which is a well-developed residential area, these sectors are primarily part of the industrial zone. Two sub-sectors of I-9 and one sub-sector of I-10 are used as industrial areas. CDA is planning to set up Islamabad Railway Station in Sector I-18 and Industrial City in sector I-17. Zone III consists primarily of the Margalla Hills and Margalla Hills National Park. Rawal Lake is in this zone. Zone IV and V consist of Islamabad Park, and rural areas of the city. The Soan River flows into the city through Zone V.

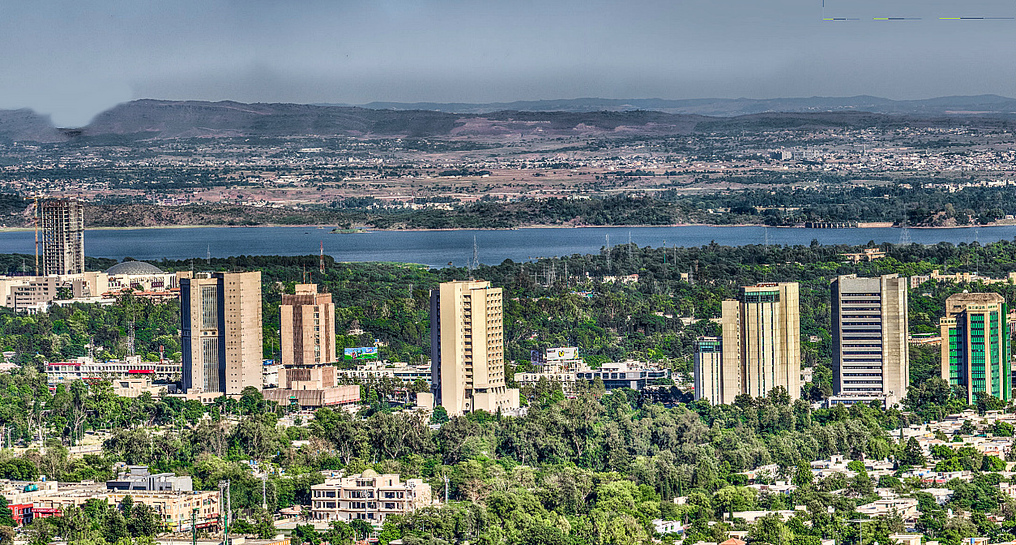
Islamabad skyline

=== Islamabad–Rawalpindi metropolitan area ===
When the master plan for Islamabad was drawn up in 1960, Islamabad and Rawalpindi, along with the adjoining areas, was to be integrated to form a large metropolitan area called Islamabad/Rawalpindi Metropolitan Area. The area would consist of the developing Islamabad, the old colonial cantonment city of Rawalpindi, and Margalla Hills National Park, including surrounding rural areas. However, Islamabad city is part of the Islamabad Capital Territory, a federal district within Punjab province, while Rawalpindi is part of Rawalpindi District, which is part of province of Punjab.

Initially, it was proposed that the three areas would be connected by four major highways: Murree Highway, Islamabad Highway, Soan Highway, and Capital Highway. However, to date only two highways have been constructed: Kashmir Highway (the former Murree Highway) and Islamabad Highway. Plans of constructing Margalla Avenue are also underway. Islamabad is the hub all the governmental activities while Rawalpindi is the centre of all industrial, commercial, and military activities. The two cities are considered sister cities and are highly interdependent.

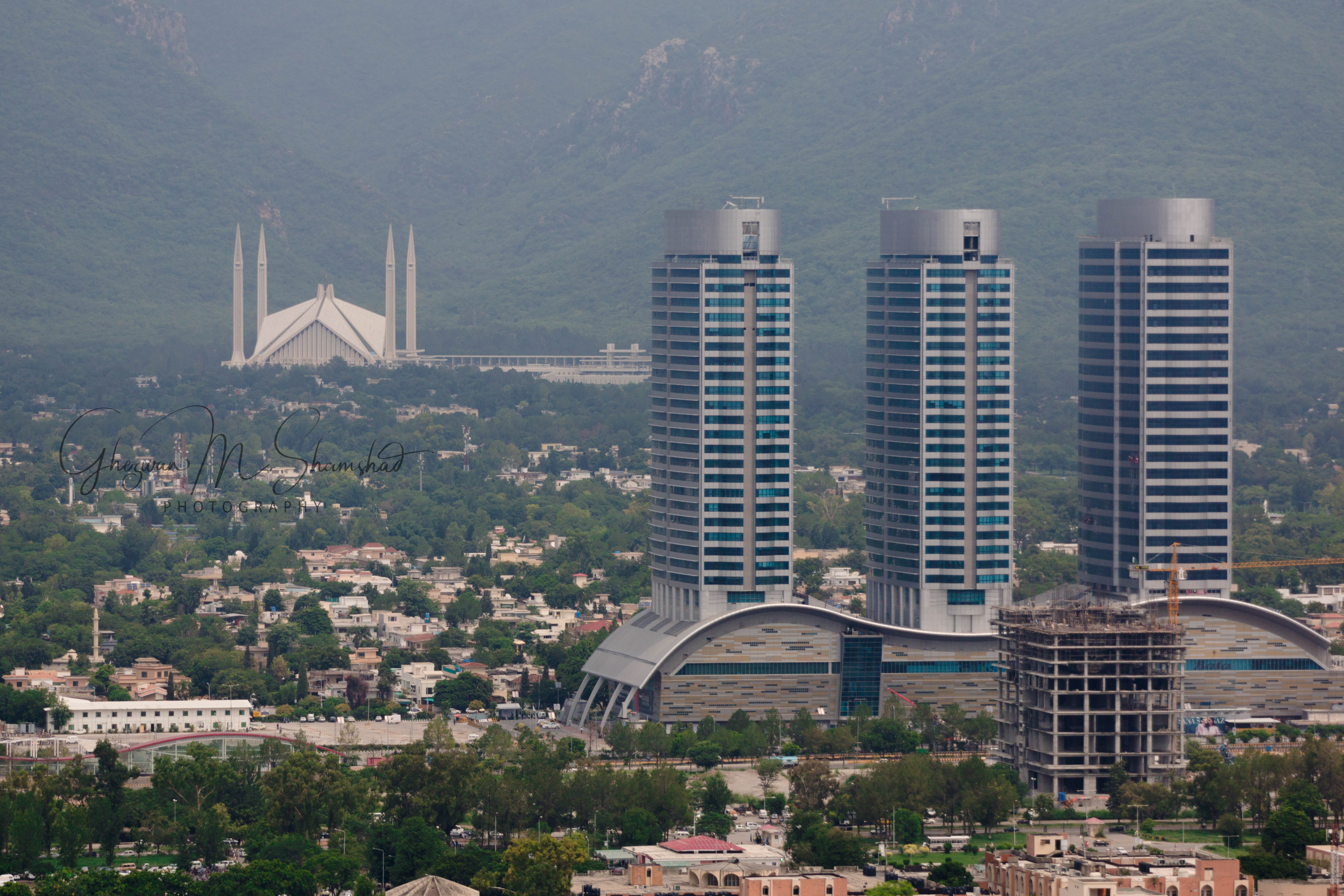
Aerial view of The Centaurus

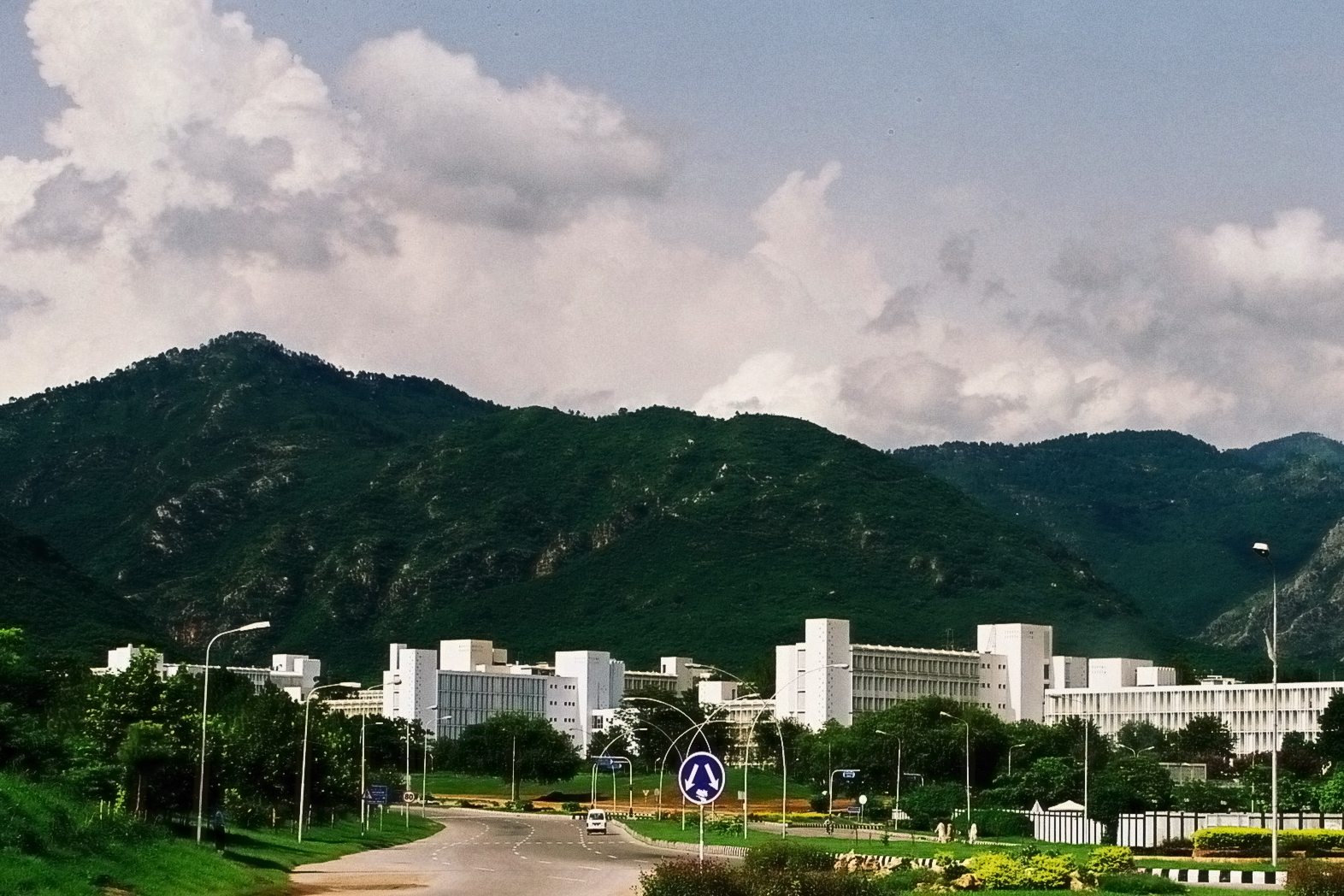
Pakistan Secretariat

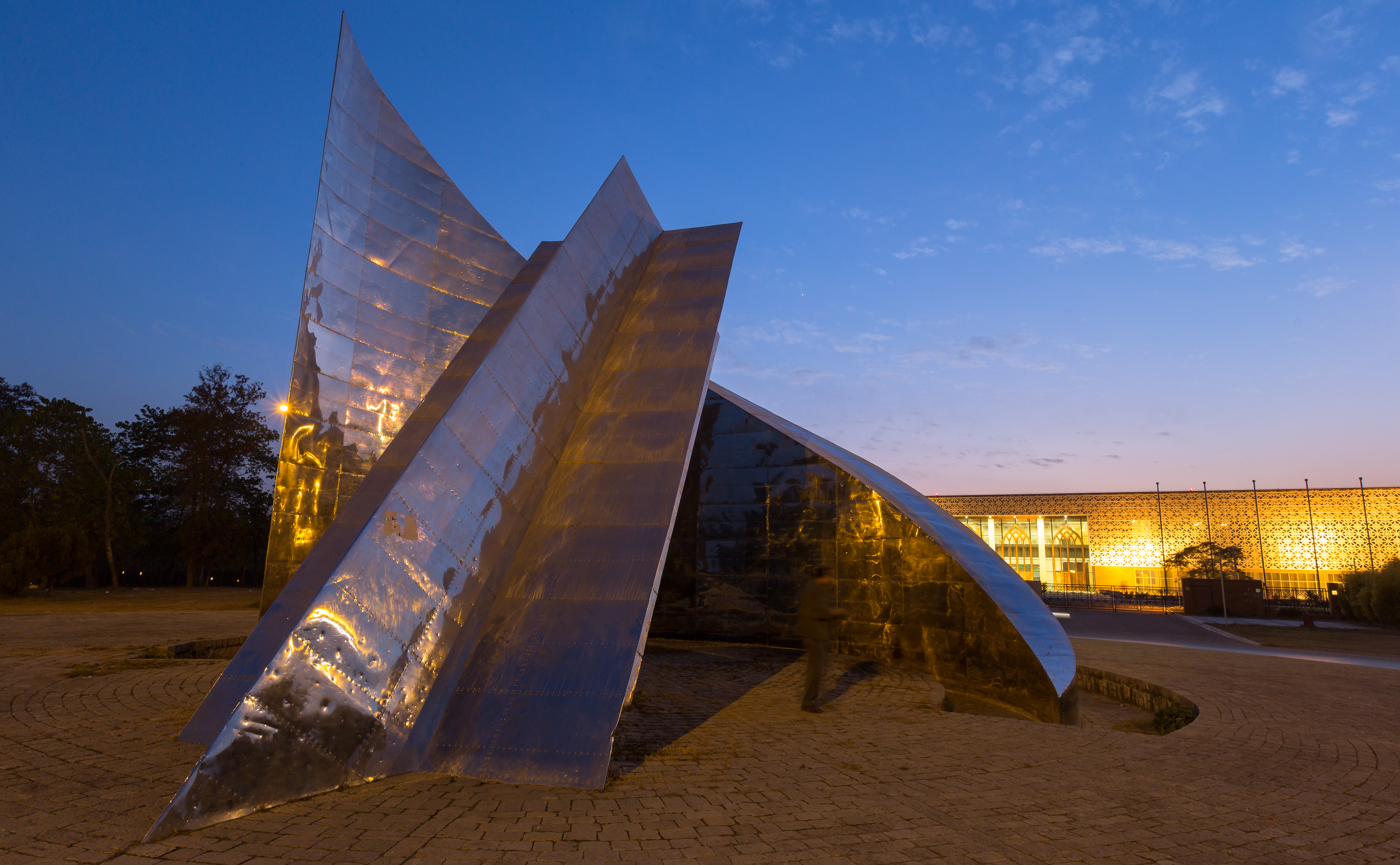
Star and Crescent Monument near the start of Shakarparian

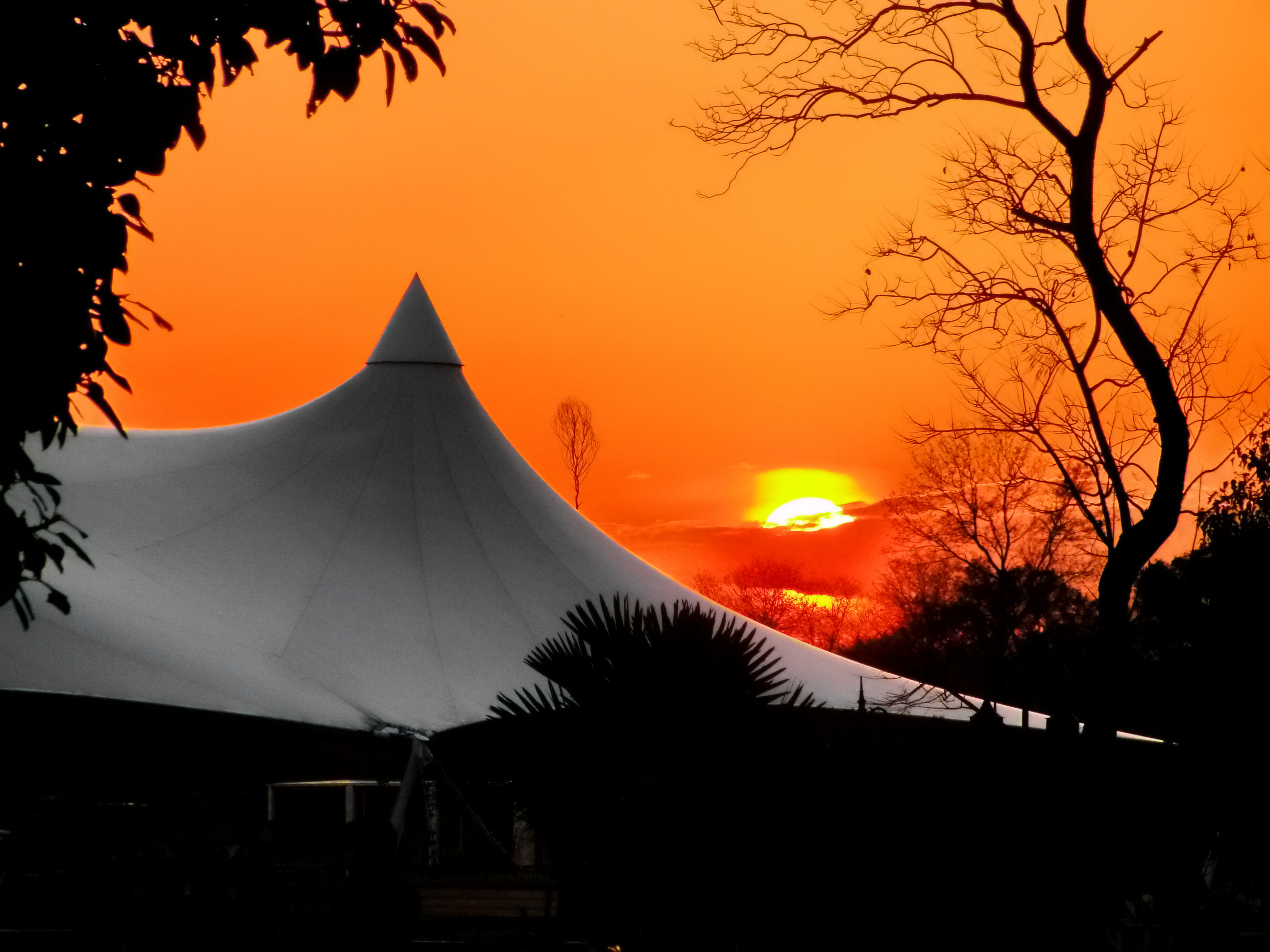
Sunset over the Lake View Park

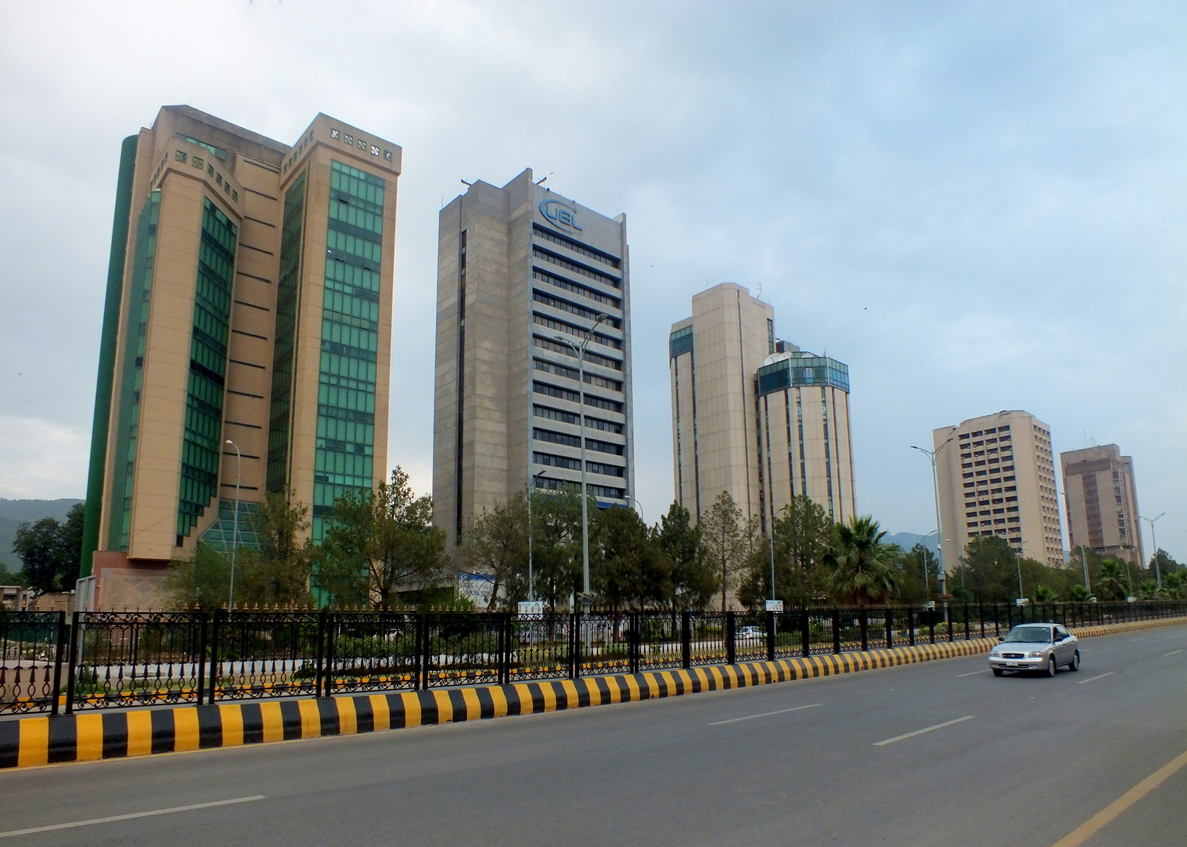
Blue Area, the commercial hub of the city.

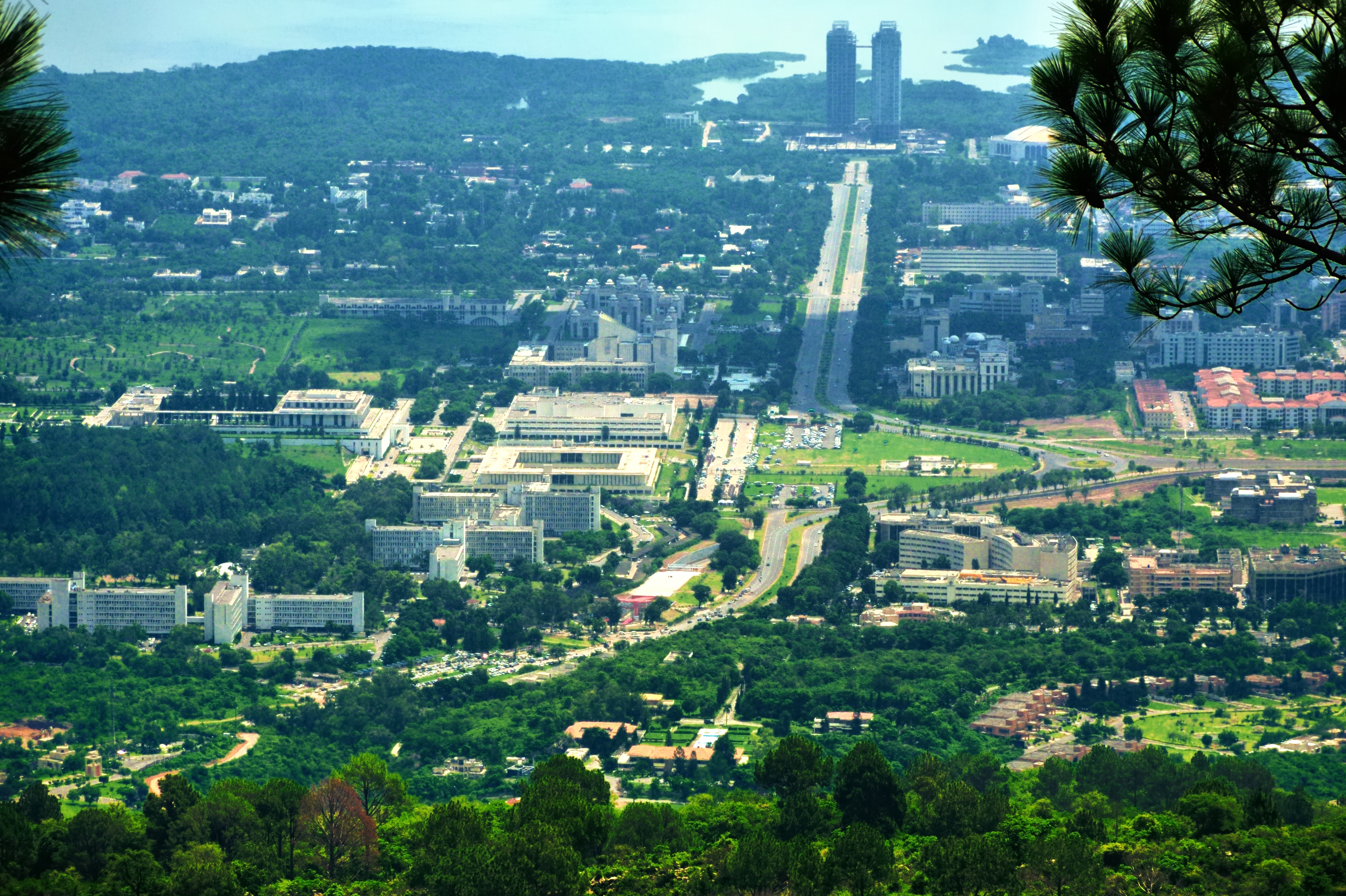
Constitution Avenue

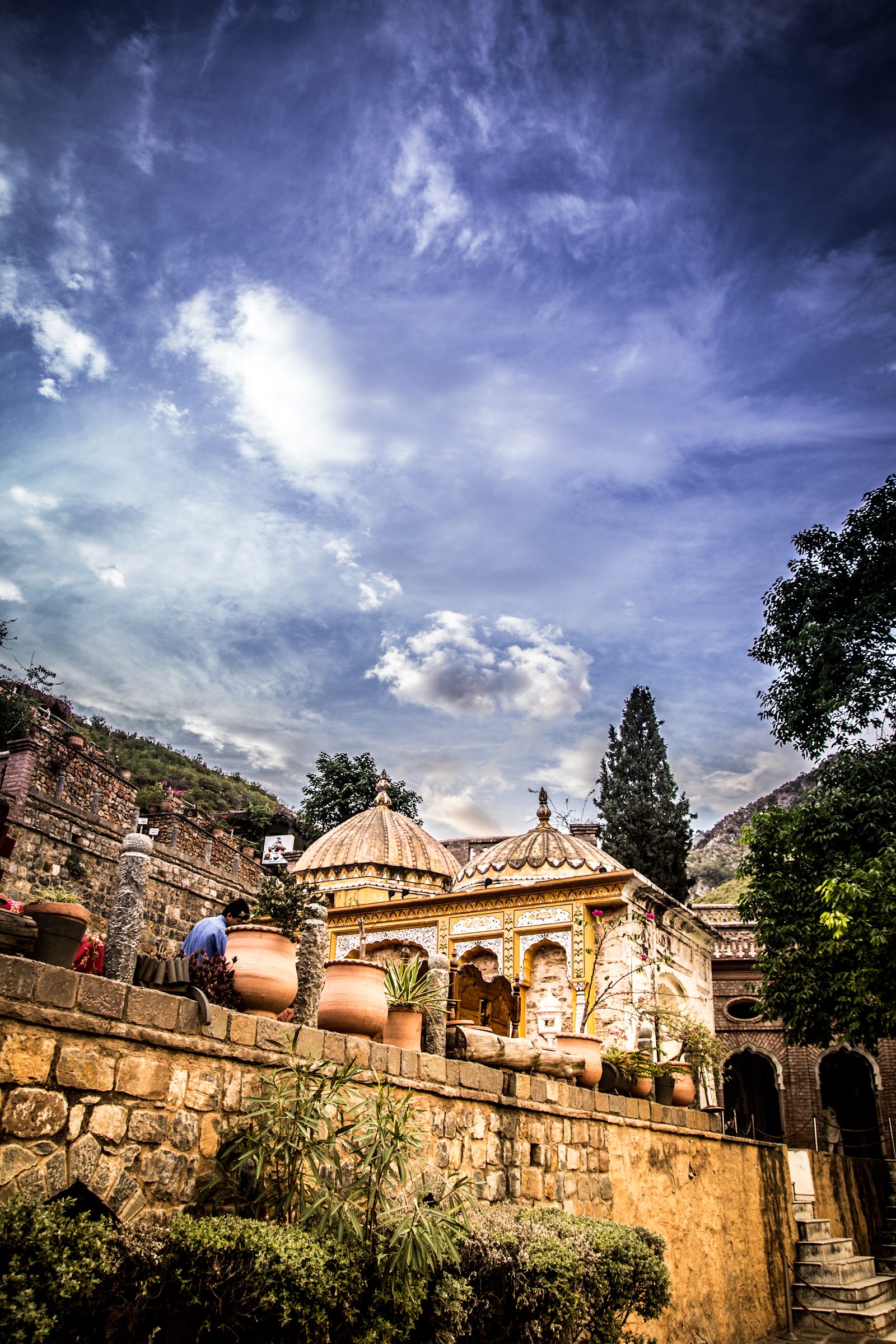
Saidpur Village

=== Architecture ===
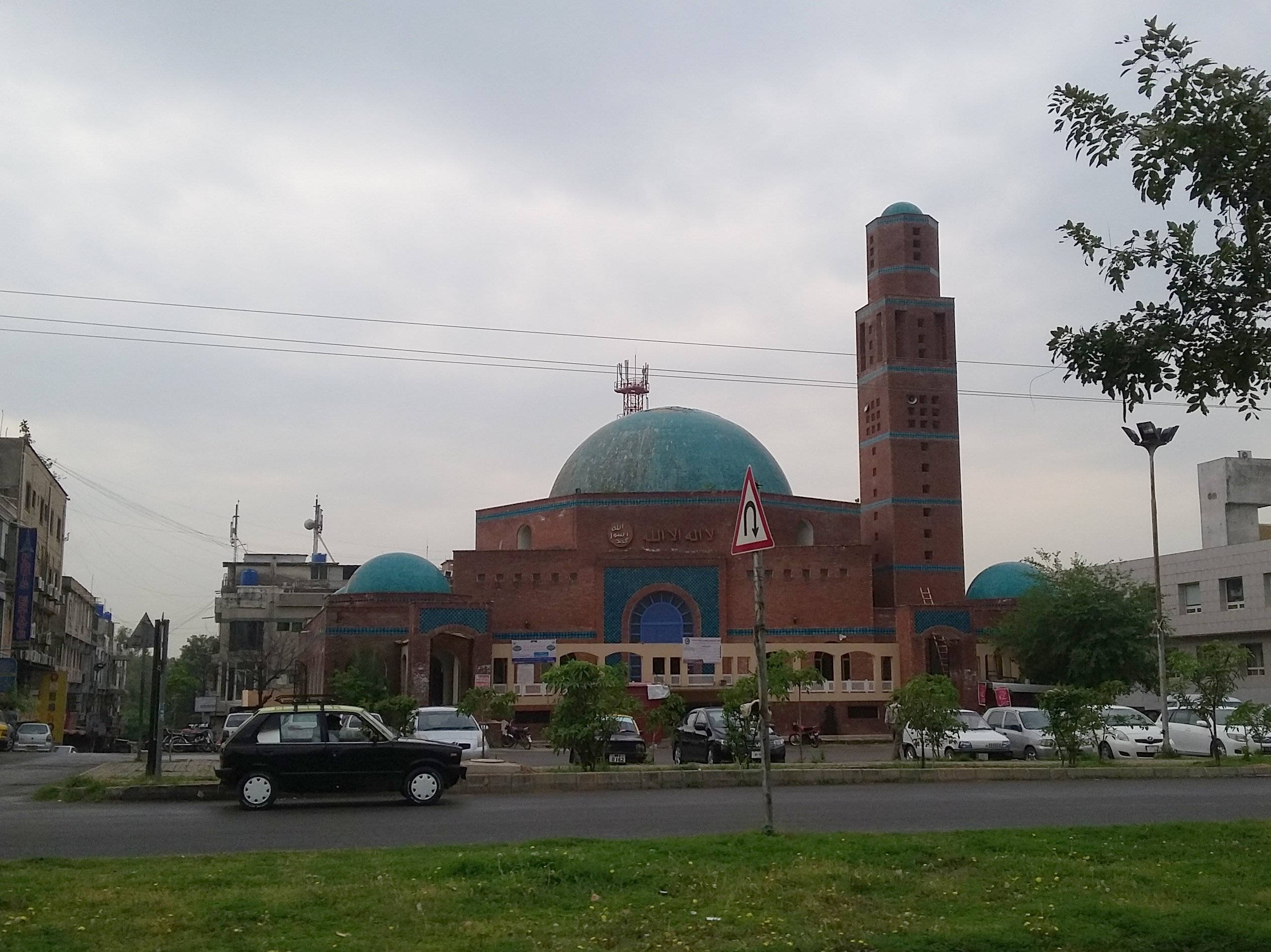
Dewan Masjid Islamabad

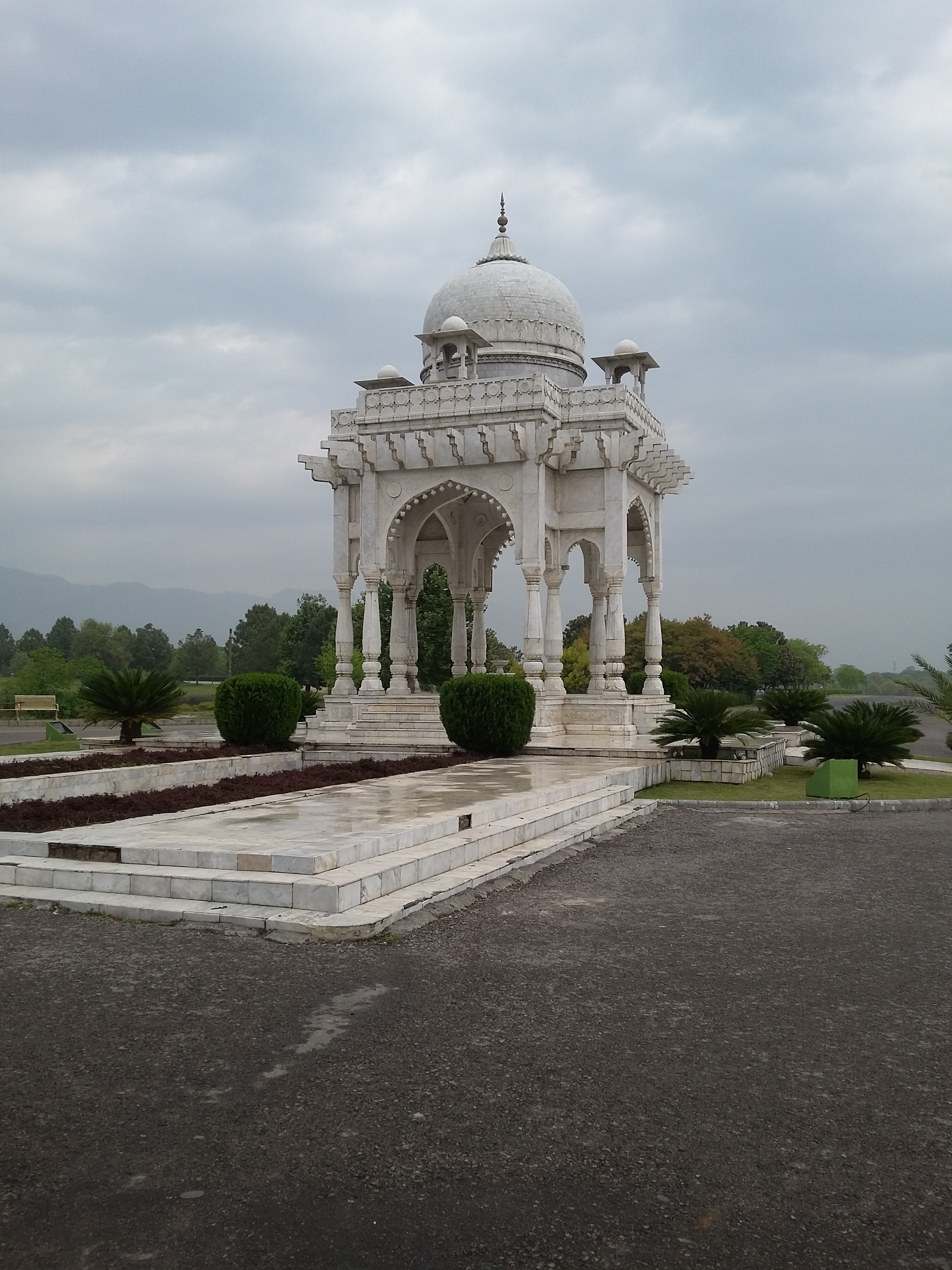
Monument in F-9 Park

Islamabad's architecture is a combination of modernity and old Islamic and regional traditions. The Saudi-Pak Tower is an example of the integration of modern architecture with traditional styles. The beige-coloured edifice is trimmed with blue tile works in Islamic tradition, and is one of Islamabad's tallest buildings. Other examples of intertwined Islamic and modern architecture include Pakistan Monument, Yadgar-e-Fatah and Faisal Mosque. Other notable structures are: Secretariat Complex designed by Gio Ponti, Prime Minister's secretariat based on Mughal architecture and the National Assembly by Edward Durell Stone.

The murals on the inside of the large petals of Pakistan Monument are based on Islamic architecture. The Shah Faisal Mosque is a fusion of contemporary architecture with a more traditional large triangular prayer hall and four minarets, designed by Vedat Dalokay, a Turkish architect and built with the help of funding provided by King Faisal of Saudi Arabia. The architecture of Faisal Mosque is unusual as it lacks a dome structure. It is a combination of Arabic, Turkish, and Mughal architectural traditions. The Centaurus is an example of modern architecture in Islamabad. The seven star hotel was designed by WS Atkins PLC. Islamabad Stock Exchange Towers is another example of modern architecture in the city.

== Demographics ==
Population

Historical population

| Year | Pop. | ±% |
|---|---|---|
| 1972 | 76,641 | — |
| 1981 | 204,364 | +166.7% |
| 1998 | 529,180 | +158.9% |

| Year | Pop. | ±% |
|---|---|---|
| 2017 | 1,009,003 | +90.7% |
| 2023 | 1,108,872 | +9.9% |

=== Language ===
Languages of Islamabad Metropolitan Corporation (2023)
1. Punjabi (46.4%)
2. Pashto (22.5%)
3. Urdu (16.6%)
4. Hindko (6.60%)
5. Saraiki (2.30%)
6. Kashmiri (1.40%)
7. Sindhi (0.93%)
8. Balti (0.34%)
9. Shina (0.31%)
10. Kohistani (0.21%)
11. Balochi (0.19%)
12. Others (2.20%)

According to 2023 Pakistani census, there are 1,154,540 Punjabi, 415,838 Pashto, 358,922 Urdu, 140,780 Hindko, 51,920 Kashmiri, 46,270 Saraiki, 21,362 Sindhi, 10,315 Balti, 7,099 Shina, 5,016 Koshistani, 4,503 Balochi, 1,095 Mewati, 668 Brahvi, 182 Kalasha and 64,734 others, of total 2,283,244 speakers in Islamabad Capital Territory.

=== Literacy ===
As of 2010, the majority of the population lies in the age group of 15–64 years, around 59.38%. Only 2.73% of the population is above 65 years of age; 37.90% is below the age of 15. Islamabad has the highest literacy rate in Pakistan, at 88%. 9.8% of the population has done intermediate education (equivalent to grades 11 and 12). 10.26% have a bachelor or equivalent degree while 5.2% have a master or equivalent degree. The labour force of Islamabad is 185,213 and the unemployment rate is 15.70%.

=== Religion ===
Religion in Islamabad Capital Territory (2023)
| Islam | 95.55% |
| Christianity | 4.26% |
| Hinduism | 0.04% |
| Others | 0.15% |

In the Islamabad Capital Territory, Islam is the largest religion in the city, with 95.55% of the population following it. Christianity is the second largest religion, with 4.26% of the population following it. The Christians are concentrated mainly in the urban areas. Hinduism is followed by 0.04% of the population according to the 2023 census.

== Economy ==
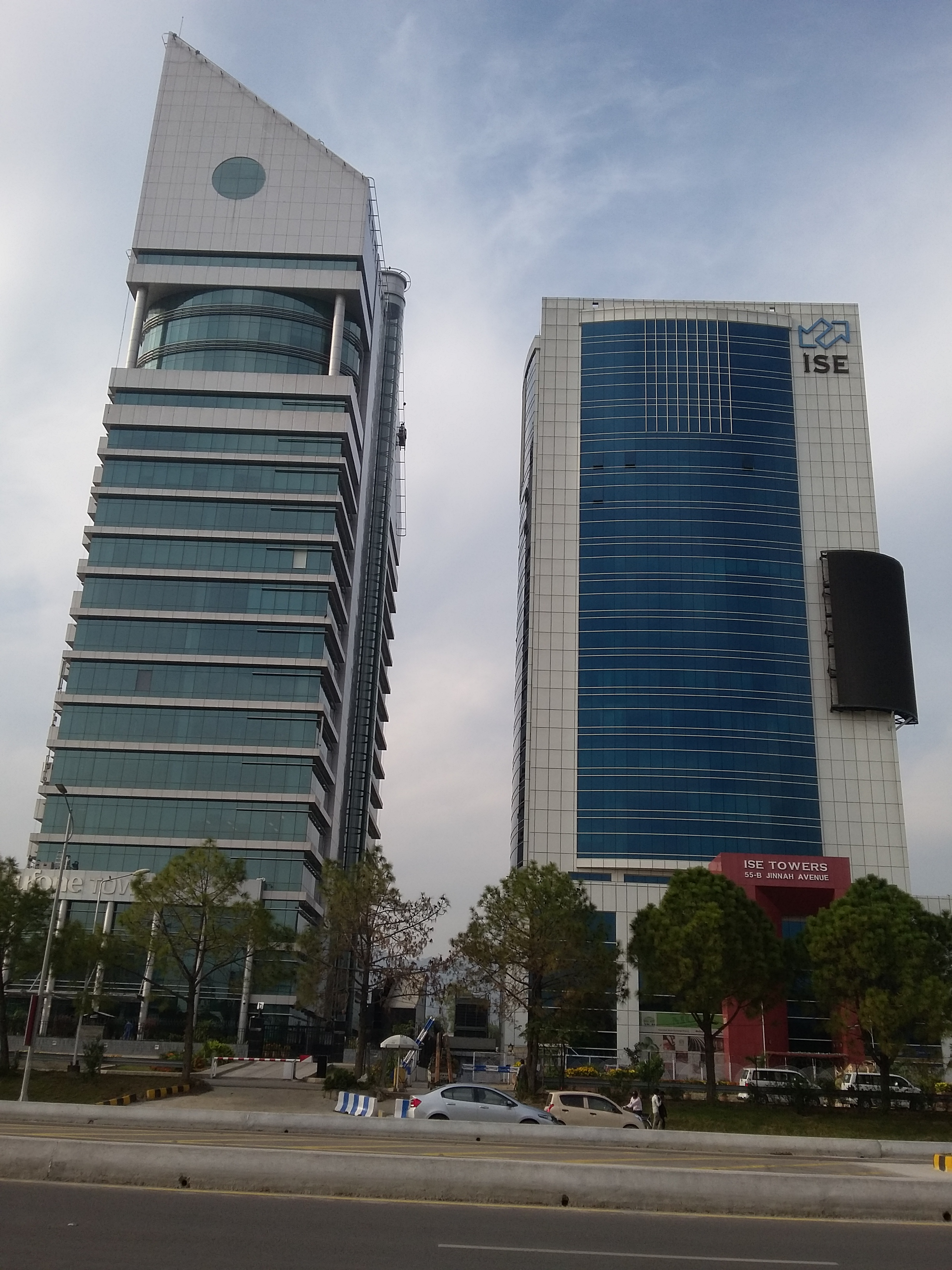
Ufone Tower and ISE Tower

Islamabad is a net contributor to the Pakistani economy, as whilst having only 0.8% of the country's population, it contributes 1% to the country's GDP. Islamabad Stock Exchange, founded in 1989, is Pakistan's third largest stock exchange after Karachi Stock Exchange and Lahore Stock Exchange, and was merged to form Pakistan Stock Exchange. The exchange had 118 members with 104 corporate bodies and 18 individual members. The average daily turnover of the stock exchange is over 1 million shares.

According to the World Bank's Doing Business Report of 2010, Islamabad was ranked as the best place to start a business in Pakistan. Islamabad's businesses are Pakistan's most compliant for paying tax dues. As of 2012, Islamabad LTU (Large Tax Unit) was responsible for Rs 371 billion in tax revenue, which amounts to 20% of all the revenue collected by Federal Board of Revenue.

Islamabad has seen an expansion in information and communications technology with the addition two Software Technology Parks, which house numerous national and foreign technological and information technology companies. Awami Markaz IT Park houses 36 IT companies, while Evacuee Trust house 29 companies. Islamabad saw its third IT Park in 2020, which was built with assistance from South Korea.

== Culture ==
Islamabad is home to many settlers from other regions of Pakistan and has a cultural and religious diversity of considerable antiquity. Due to its location on the Pothohar Plateau, remnants of ancient cultures and civilisations such as Aryan, Soanian, and Indus Valley civilisation can still be found in the region. Pharwala Fort, built by Gakhars in the 15th century, is located near Islamabad. The 16th-century Rawat Fort, also built by the Gakhars, contains the grave of their chief Sultan Sarang Khan.

Saidpur village is supposedly named after Said Khan, the son of Sarang Khan. The 500-year-old village was converted into a place of Hindu worship by a Mughal commander, Raja Man Singh. He constructed a number of small ponds: Rama kunda, Sita kunda, Lakshaman kunda, and Hanuman kunda. The region is home to a small Hindu temple that is preserved, showing the presence of Hindu people in the region. The shrine of Sufi mystic Pir Meher Ali Shah is located at Golra Sharif, which has a rich cultural heritage of the pre-Islamic period. Archaeological remains of the Buddhist era can also still be found in the region. The shrine of Bari Imam was built by the Mughal emperor Aurangzeb. Thousands of devotees from across Pakistan attend the annual Urs of Bari Imam. The event is one of the largest religious gatherings in Islamabad. In 2004, the Urs was attended by more than 1.2 million people.

The Lok Virsa Museum in Islamabad preserves a wide variety of expressions of folk and traditional cultural legacy of Pakistan. It is located near the Shakarparian hills and boasts a large display of embroidered costumes, jewellery, musical instruments, woodwork, utensils and folkloristic objects from the region and other parts of Pakistan.

== Tourism ==
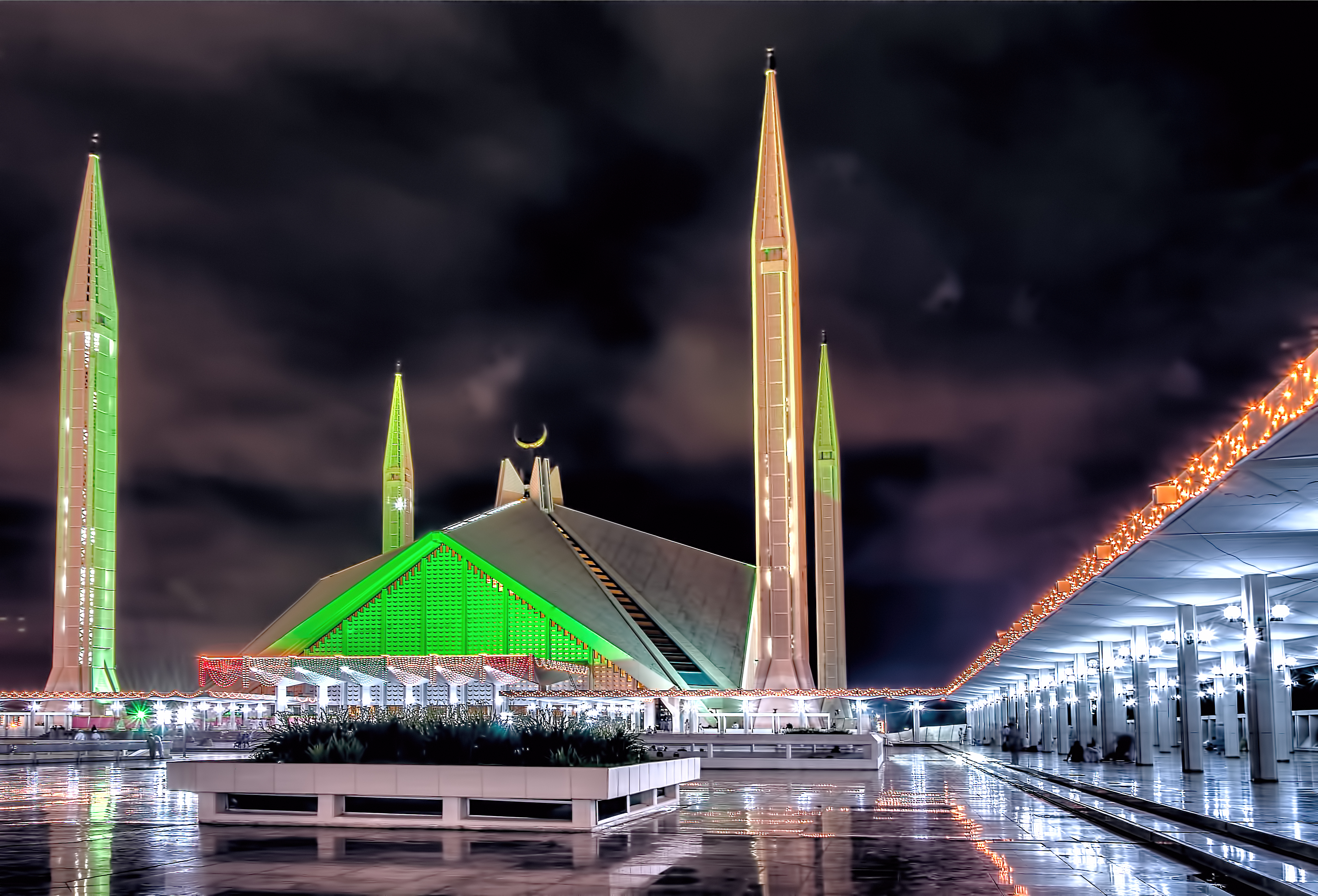
Faisal Mosque during Ramadan

The Faisal Mosque, built in 1986, is an iconic cultural and religious landmark that attracts many tourists; both domestic and international due to its modern interpertation of Islamic architecture designed by the Turkish architect Vedat Dalokay, as well as its location at the foothills of the Margalla Hills. The mosque was named after Faisal bin Abdul Aziz, the then-King of Saudi Arabia to honour him for his role in financing the construction of the mosque. The mosque itself can host up to 74,000 worshippers at a time and its interior is decorated with Islamic calligraphy of verses from the Quran.

One of the landmarks for tourists is the Pakistan Monument built in 2007 located in Islamabad. This tourist attraction represents the patriotism and sovereignty of Pakistan. The design is shaped as a dome with petal-shaped walls that are engraved with arts portraying Pakistan's other tourist landmarks such as the Badshahi Mosque, Minar-e-Pakistan and Lahore Fort.

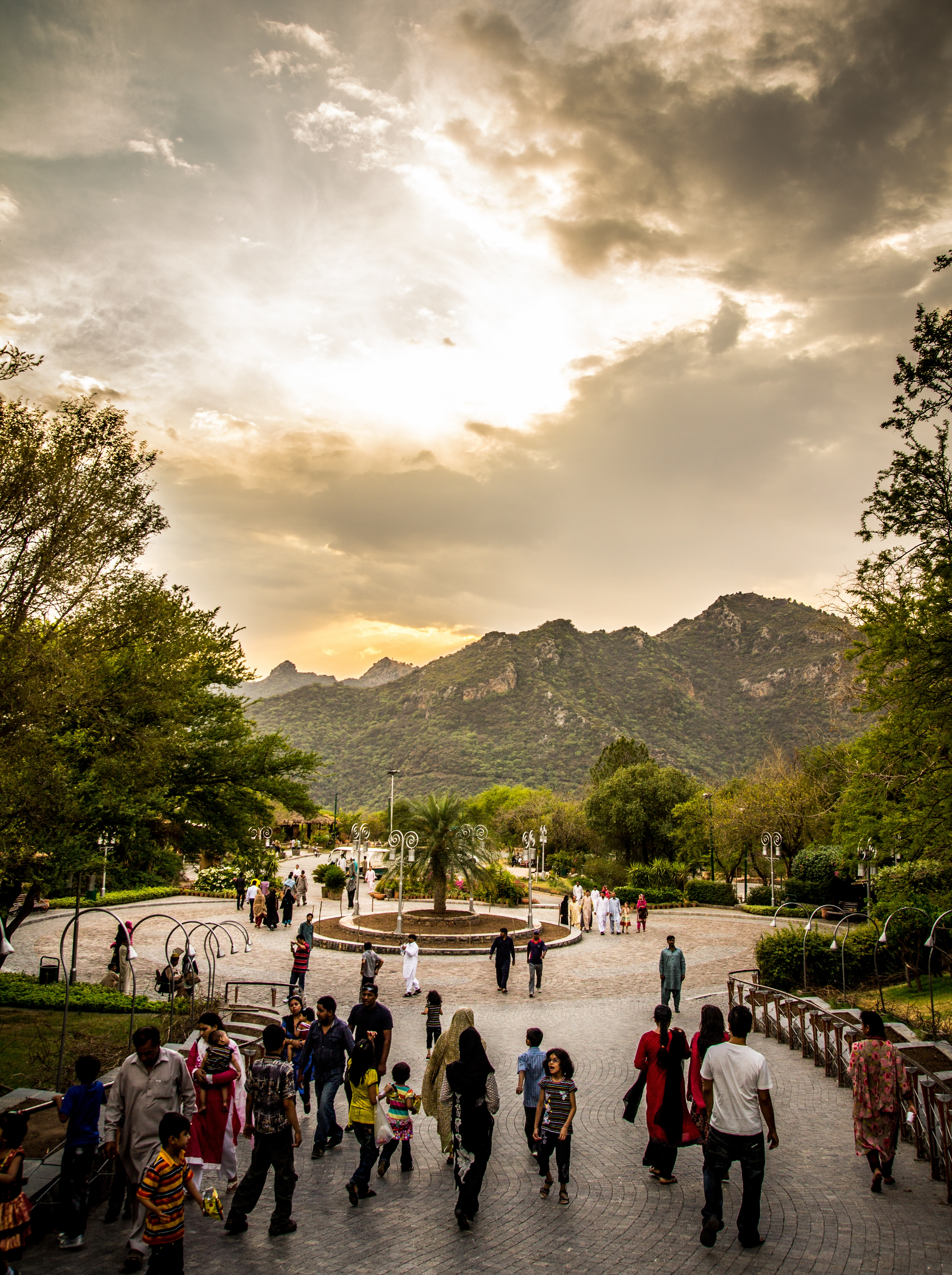
Daman-e-Koh Park

Islamabad holds some of Pakistan's most prestigious museums such as Lok Virsa Museum, Institute of Folk and Traditional Heritage Shakarparian Park and prominent galleries such as the National Art Gallery and Gallery 6.

The Islamabad Museum contains many relics and artifacts dating back to the Gandhara period of the region, an intriguing fusion of Buddhist and Graeco-Roman styles. The living culture of Islamabad and Pakistan is best explored at Lok Virsa Museum, as well as the Institute of Folk and Traditional Heritage in Shakarparian Park.

Islamabad is built upon civilisation and architecture that ranges from the 10th century to the modern era. As Islamabad is situated on the Potohar Plateau, the remains of civilisation descending from stone-age era include the Acheulian and the Soanian traditions and these are tourist landmarks. Islamabad has an array of historic landmarks that reflect the Hindu civilisation that dates back to the 16th Century with examples such as Saidpur. Saidpur that is situated in Islamabad has progressed from a village to a sacred place that includes temples where the Hindu Mughal Commanders worshipped.

Margalla Hills National Park is located in the North sector of Islamabad and is in close proximity to the Himalayas. The National Park is home to a range of wildlife, including Himalayan goral, Barking deer and leopards. Margalla Hills National Park also has accommodation and camping grounds for tourists.

=== Recreation ===
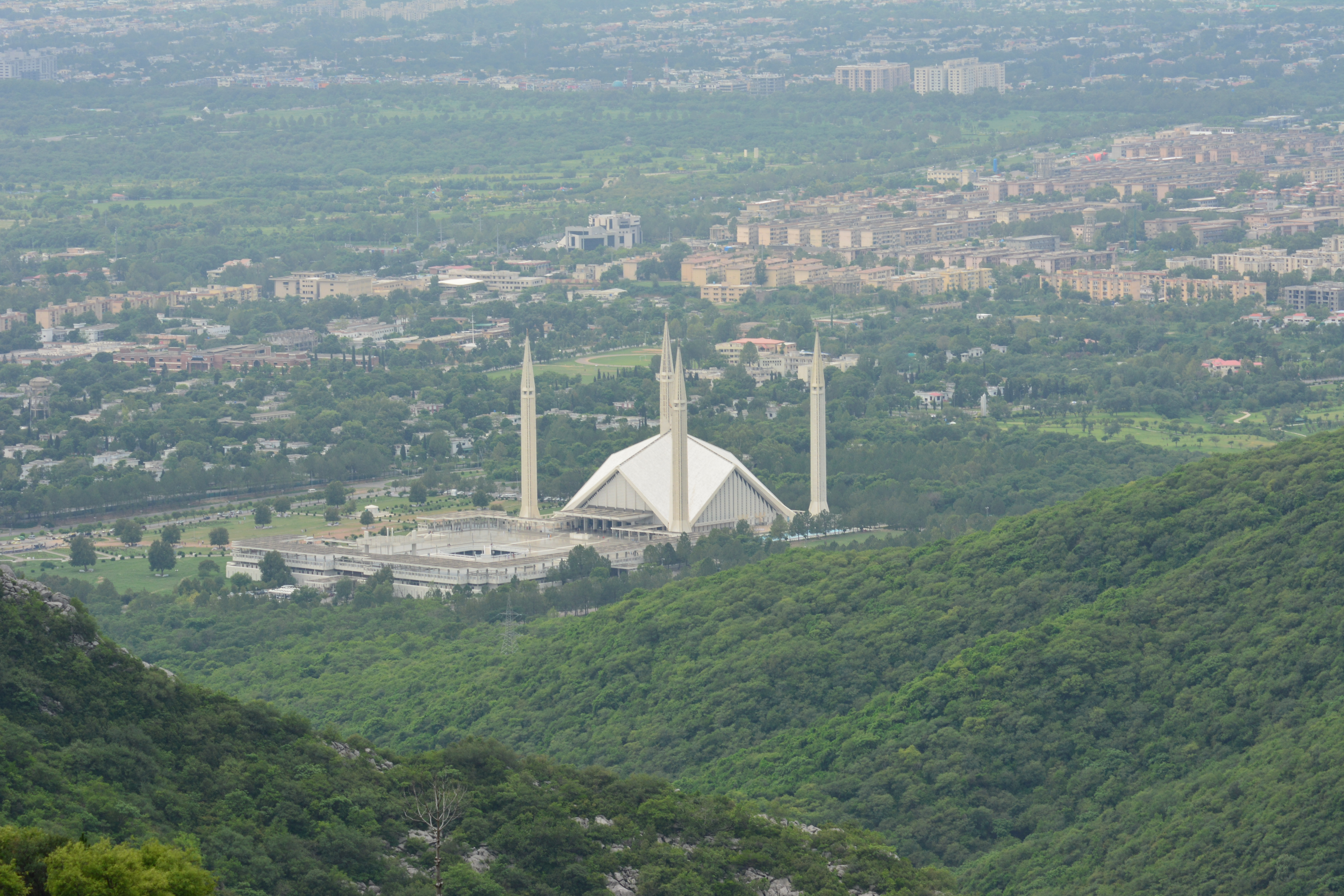
Faisal Mosque as seen from Margalla Hills

Located in the city, the Faisal Mosque is the largest mosque in South Asia and the sixth–largest mosque in the world. Built in the year 1986, it was named after the late king of Saudi Arabia, Faisal Bin Abdul Aziz, who backed and financed the construction.

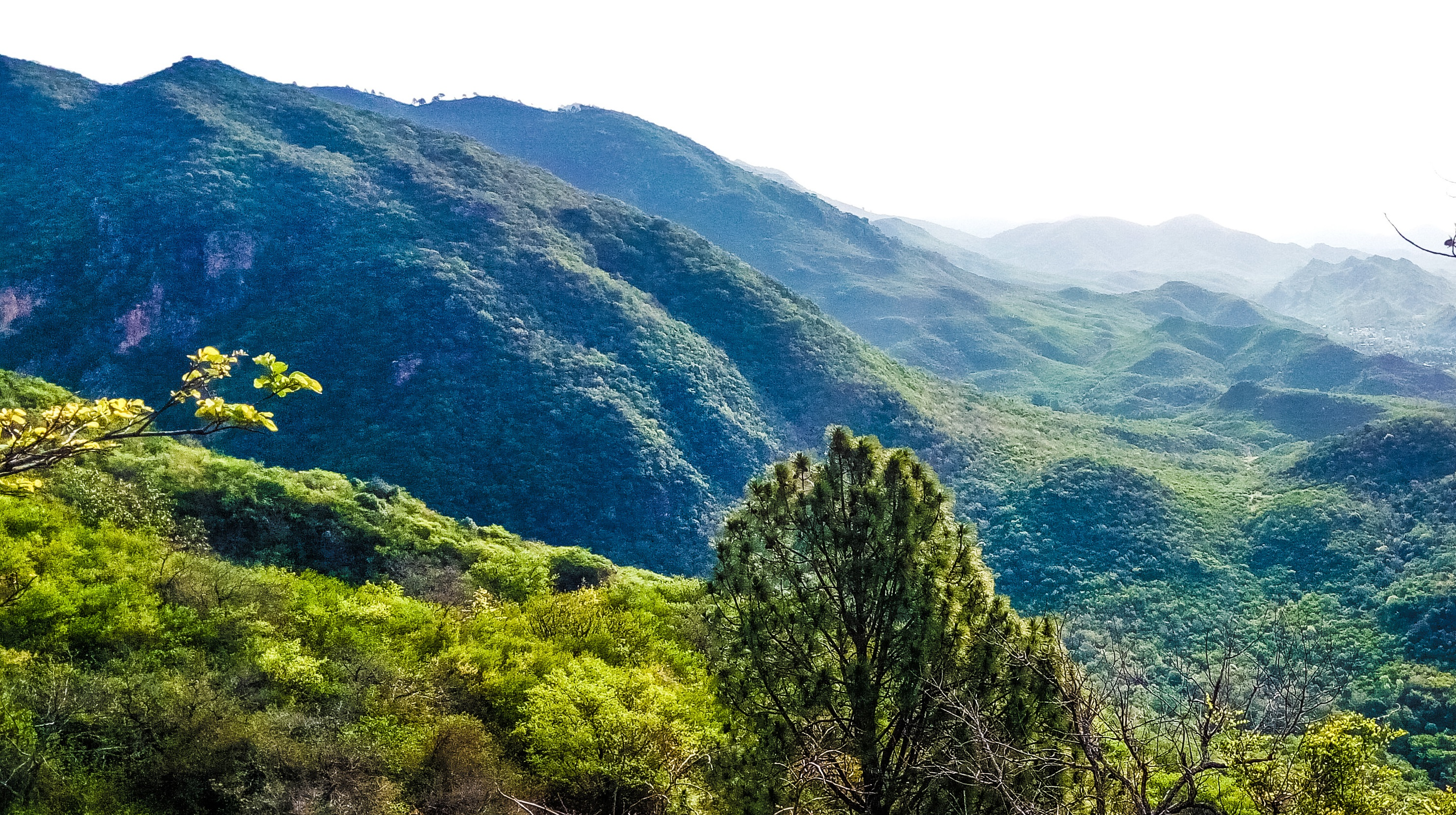
Trail 3 Islamabad

The most famous and oldest hiking track of Islamabad is Trail 3. It starts from the Margalla Road in sector F-6/3. Due to steep hills, the trail is exhausting to some extent. The course leads to the point where it goes up to the Viewpoint and is about a 30–50 minutes track. After the Viewpoint it continues for another easy-going 45 – 60 minutes and reaches the Pir Sohawa, where there are two restaurants for food, The Monal and La Montana. In total, it is approximately a one-hour and thirty minute walk.

Shah Allah Ditta village is a centuries-old village and a union council of the Islamabad Capital Authority. The village is named after a dervish who belonged to the Mughal era. It is estimated to be 650 years old approximately. It is also home to ancient caves that reflects the previous civilisations. The 2500-year-old Buddhist caves at the foot of Margalla Hills are located in west of Taxila, east of Islamabad and in the central area of Khanpur. A spring, a pond and a garden still exist near the Shah Allah Ditta Caves. There are some banyan trees in the garden, while all other fruit trees are gone. The water from the same spring was used to irrigate the garden adjoining the caves. During the Mughal period, when India was the centre of Sufism originating from Arabia and Central Asia, a saint named Shah Allah Ditta stayed in this garden and was entombed here. The place formerly attributed to sadhus, monks, or jogis is today known for the famous Sufi Shah Allah Ditta. A short distance from these caves is also an ancient baoli (stepwell) in the village of Kanthila, which is said to have been built by Sher Shah Suri.

== Transport ==
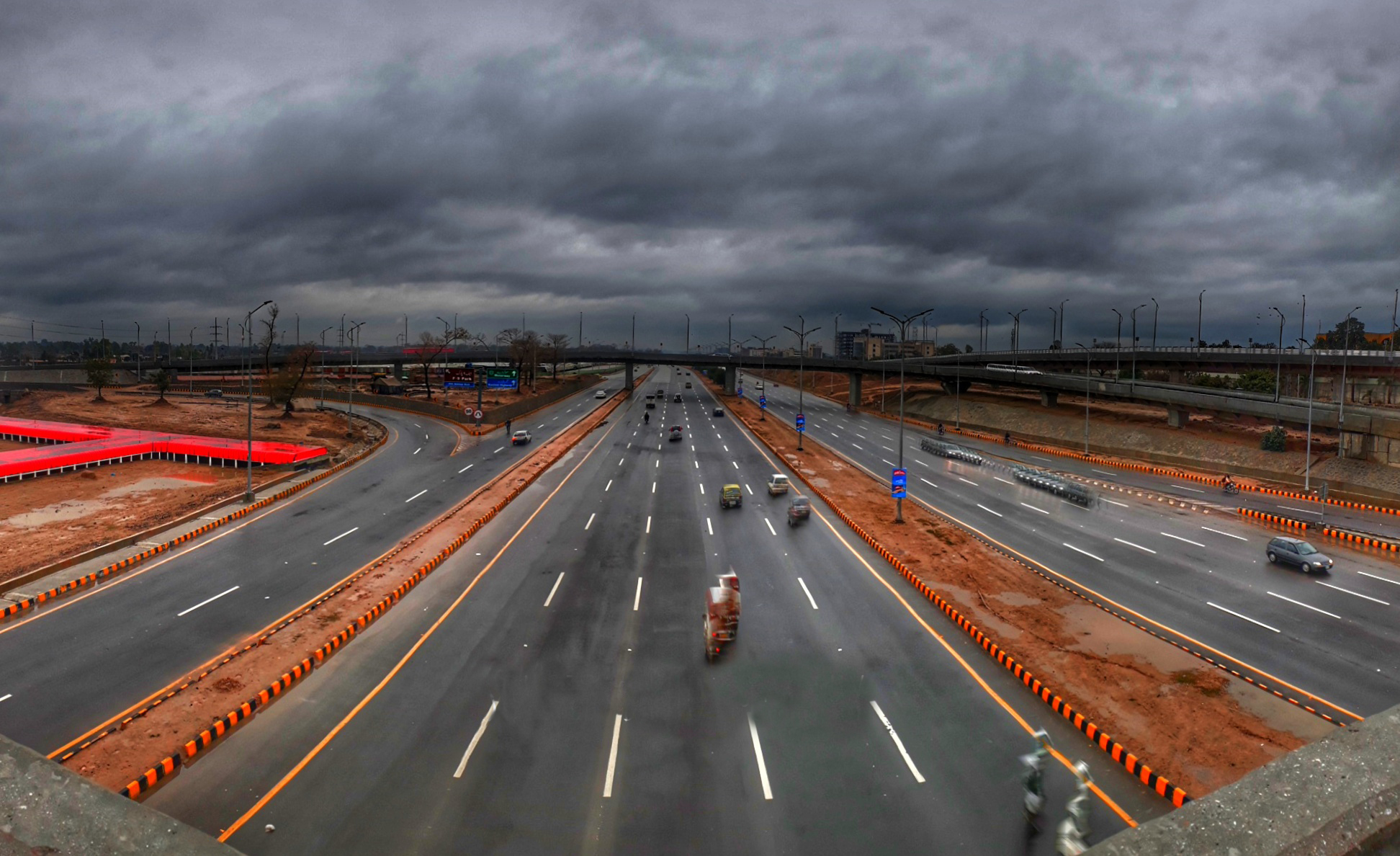
Srinagar Highway, Islamabad

=== Aerial transport ===
Islamabad is connected to major destinations around the world and domestically through Islamabad International Airport (IIAP). The airport is the largest in Pakistan and is located south-west of Islamabad. The new airport inaugurated on 20 April 2018, spreads over 19 square kilometres with 15 passenger boarding bridges. It also includes facilities to accommodate two double-decker Airbus A380s, 15 remote bays and 3 remote bays for Air cargo.

=== Public transport ===
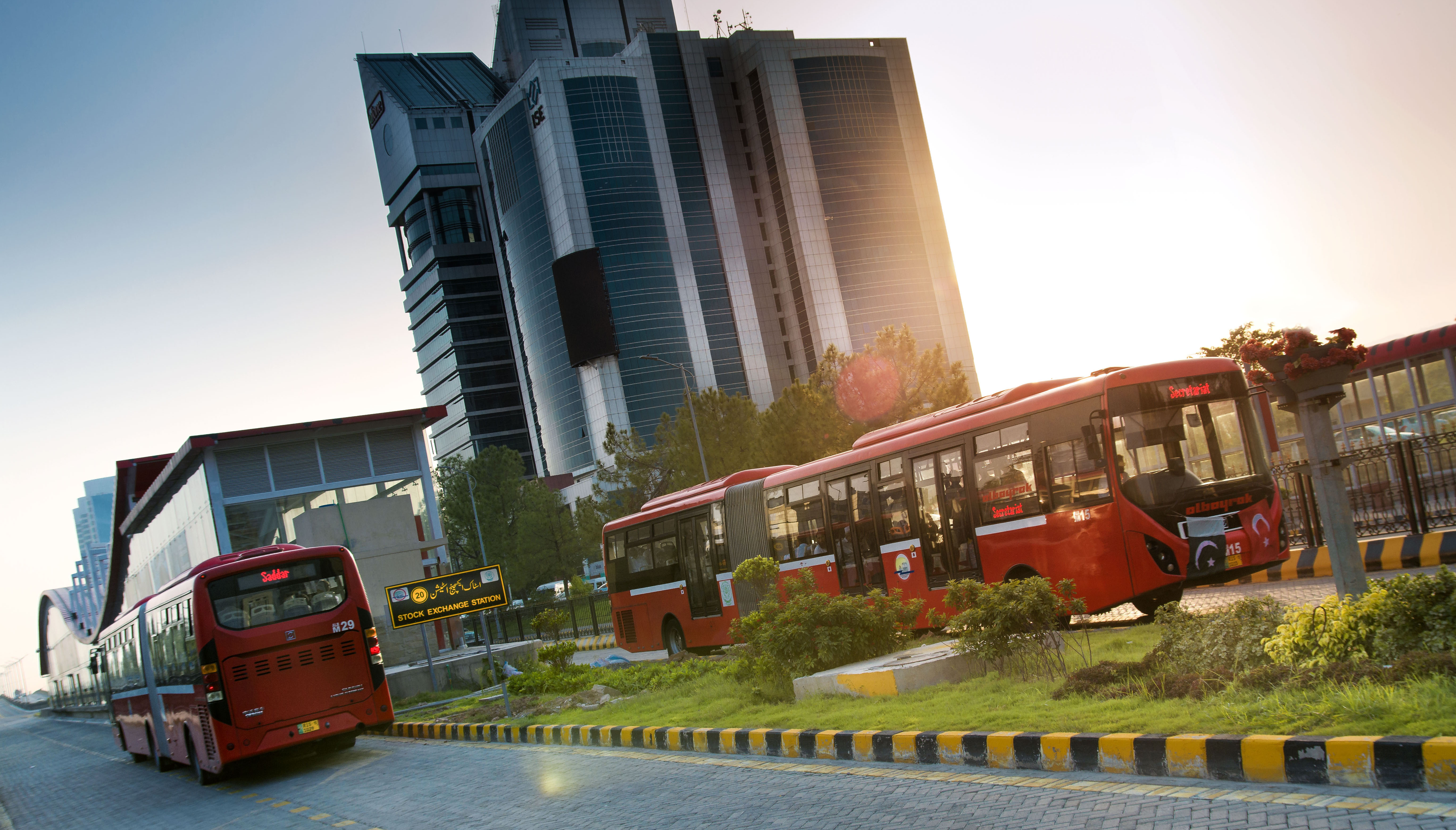
Islamabad Metrobus

The Rawalpindi-Islamabad Metrobus is a 83.6 km (51.9 mi) bus rapid transit system operating in the Islamabad-Rawalpindi metropolitan area. The Metrobus network's first phase was opened on 4 June 2015, and stretches 22.5 kilometres between Pak Secretariat, in Islamabad, and Saddar in Rawalpindi. The second stage stretches 25.6 kilometres between the Peshawar Morr Interchange and New Islamabad International Airport and was inaugurated on 18 April 2022. On 7 July 2022, the Green Line and Blue Lines were added to this Metrobus network. The system uses e-ticketing and an Intelligent Transportation System and is managed by the Punjab Mass Transit Authority. The metro buses are widely used for commuting purposes by the labour force and students.

=== Railway ===
Islamabad railway station is located in sector I-9 in Islamabad, Capital Territory, Pakistan. The station appears as Margala on the Pakistan Railways website.

=== Private transport ===
People use private transport like Taxis, Careem, Bykea, Indrive and Yango for local journeys.

=== Roadways ===
M-2 Motorway is 367 km (228 mi) long and connects Islamabad and Lahore. M-1 Motorway connects Islamabad with Peshawar and is 155 km (96 mi) long. Islamabad is linked to Rawalpindi through the Faizabad Interchange, which has a daily traffic volume of about 48,000 vehicles.

== Education ==
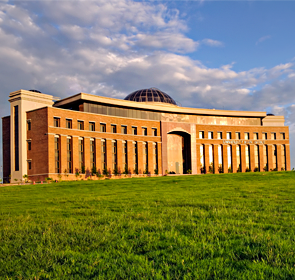
National University of Sciences and Technology

As of 2010, Islamabad boasts the highest literacy rate in Pakistan at 98%, and has some of the most advanced educational institutes in the country. A large number of public and private sector educational institutes are present here. The higher education institutes in the capital are either federally chartered or administered by private organisations and almost all of them are recognised by the Higher Education Commission of Pakistan. High schools and colleges are either affiliated with the Federal Board of Intermediate and Secondary Education or with the UK universities education boards, O/A Levels, or IGCSE. According to the Academy of Educational Planning and Management's report, in 2009 there were a total of 913 recognised institutions in Islamabad (31 pre-primary, 2 religious, 367 primary, 162 middle, 250 high, 75 higher secondary and intermediate colleges, and 26 degree colleges). There are seven teacher training institutes in Islamabad with a total enrolment of 604,633 students and 499 faculty.

The Gender Parity Index in Islamabad is 0.93 compared to the 0.95 national average. There are 178 boys-only institutes, 175 girls-only, and 551 mixed institutes in Islamabad. Total enrolment of students in all categories is 267,992; 138,272 for boys and 129,720 for girls. There are 16 recognised universities in Islamabad with a total enrolment of 372,974 students and 30,144 teachers. Most of the top ranked universities; National University of Sciences and Technology, COMSATS Institute of Information Technology and Pakistan Institute of Engineering & Applied Sciences, also have their headquarters in the capital. The world's second largest general university by enrolment, Allama Iqbal Open University is located in Islamabad for distance education. Other universities include Air University, Bahria University, Center for Advanced Studies in Engineering, Federal Urdu University of Arts, Science and Technology, Hamdard University, National University of Computer and Emerging Sciences, Capital University of Science & Technology, National Defence University, Shifa Tameer-e-Millat University, National University of Modern Languages, Iqra University, International Islamic University, Virtual University of Pakistan, Muhammad Ali Jinnah University, The University of Lahore, Abasyn University, and The Millennium University College.

== Healthcare ==
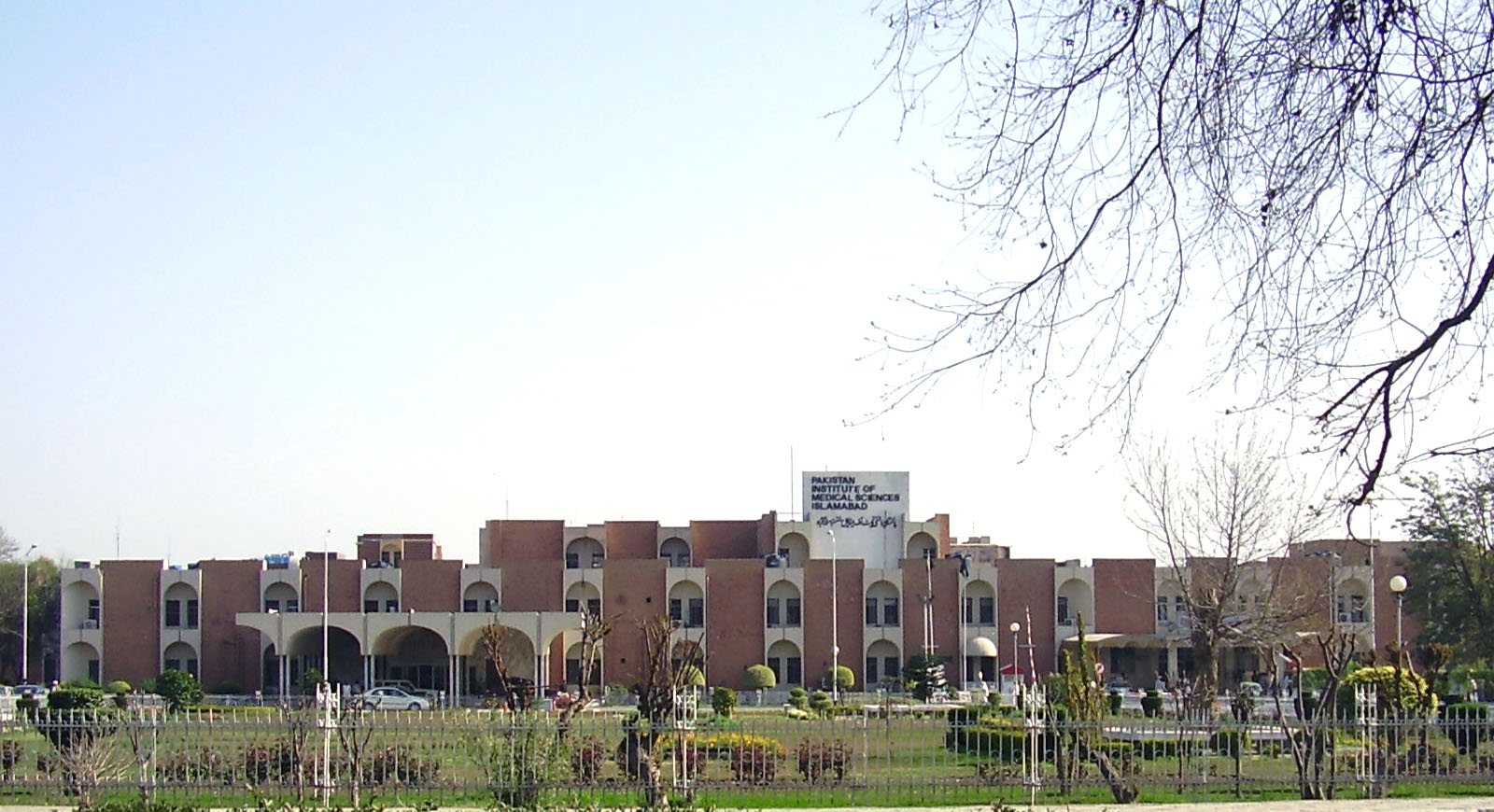
Pakistan Institute of Medical Sciences

In 2008, Islamabad had the lowest rate of infant mortality in the country at 38 deaths per thousand compared to the national average of 78 deaths per thousand. Islamabad has both public and private medical centres. The largest hospital in Islamabad is Pakistan Institute of Medical Sciences (PIMS) hospital. It was established in 1985 as a teaching and doctor training institute. PIMS functions as a National Reference Center and provides specialised diagnostic and curative services. The hospital has 30 major medical departments. PIMS is divided into five administrative branches. Islamabad Hospital is the major component with a 592-bed facility and 22 medical and surgical specialties.

The Children's Hospital is a 230-bed hospital completed in 1985. It contains six major facilities: Surgical and Allied Specialties, Medical and Allied Specialties, Diagnostic Facilities, Operation Theatre, Critical Care (NICU, PICU, Isolation & Accident Emergency), and a Blood Bank. The Maternal and Child Health Care Center is a training institute with an attached hospital of 125 beds offering different clinical and operational services. PIMS consists of five academic institutes: Quaid-e-Azam Postgraduate Medical College, College of Nursing, College of Medical Technology, School of Nursing, and Mother and Child Health Center.

PAEC General Hospital and teaching institute, established in 2006, is affiliated with the Pakistan Atomic Energy Commission. The hospital consists of a 100-bed facility and 10 major departments: Obstetrics and Gynecology, Pediatric, General Medicine, General Surgery, Intensive Care Unit/Coronary Care Unit, Orthopedics, Ophthalmology, Pathology, Radiology, and Dental Department. Shifa International Hospital is a teaching hospital in Islamabad that was founded in 1987 and became a public company in 1989. The hospital has 70 qualified consultants in almost all specialties, 150 IPD beds and OPD facilities in 35 different specialisations. According to the Federal Bureau of Statistics of the Government of Pakistan, in 2008 there were 12 hospitals, 76 dispensaries, and five maternity and child welfare centres in the city with a total of 5,158 beds.

== Sports ==
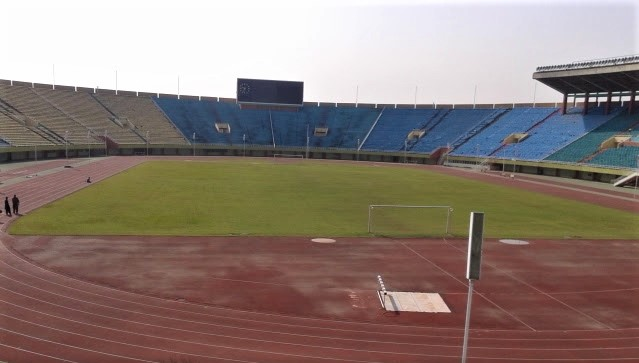
Jinnah Sports Stadium

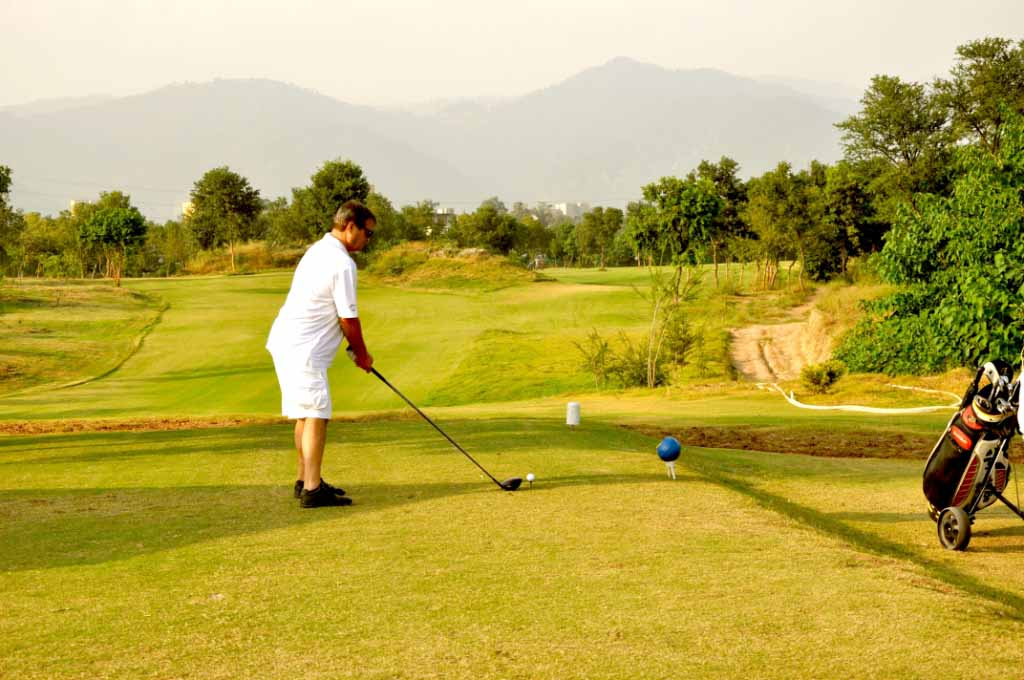
Islamabad Golf Club

Islamabad has a multipurpose sports complex opposite Aabpara. It includes Liaquat Gymnasium for indoor games, Mushaf Squash Complex and Jinnah Sports Stadium for outdoor games, which is a venue for regular national and international events. 2004 SAF Games were held in the stadium. Some other sports venues of Islamabad include Diamond Club Ground, Shalimar Cricket Ground and Islamabad Golf Club.

There is another multipurpose sports complex in the F6 Markaz. It has tennis courts, a basketball court with fibre-glass boards and a Futsal ground which introduced artificial turf to the people of Islamabad.

Major sports in the city include cricket, football, squash, hockey, table tennis, rugby and boxing. The city is home to Islamabad United which won the first ever Pakistan Super League in 2016 and second title in 2018, and Islamabad All Stars, which participates in the Super Kabaddi League.

Islamabad also has various rock climbing spots in the Margalla Hills.

The Pakistan Sports Complex has three swimming pools for children. These facilities attract a large gathering on weekends.

== Twin towns and sister cities ==
- Abu Dhabi, United Arab Emirates
- Amman, Jordan
- Ankara, Turkey
- Beijing, China
- Jakarta, Indonesia 1984, restarted in 2010
- Madrid, Spain
- Minsk, Belarus
- Seoul, South Korea
- Astana, Kazakhstan

== See also ==
- List of people from Islamabad

== Bibliography ==
- Daechsel, Markus (2015). Islamabad and the Politics of International Development in Pakistan. New York: Cambridge University Press. ISBN 978-11-07-05717-3.
- Moatasim, Faiza (2023). Master Plans and Encroachments: The Architecture of Informality in Islamabad. University of Pennsylvania Press. ISBN 978-1-5128-2519-0.
- Nadiem, Ihsan H. (2006). Islamabad Pothohar, Taxila Valley and Beyond: History & Monuments. Sang-e-Meel Publications. ISBN 978-969-35-1904-4. OCLC 85891881.
- Yakas, Orestes (2001). Islamabad, The Birth of a Capital. Karachi: Oxford University Press. ISBN 0-19-579533-4.
