= List of parks and gardens in Pakistan =

This is a list of notable parks and gardens in Pakistan.

== By type ==
=== Amusement parks ===
- Aladdin World, Karachi
- Aquafun Resort, Bahtar near Taxila
- Dino Valley Theme Park, Islamabad
- Go Aish, Karachi
- Japanese Park, Islamabad
- Jinnah Park, Rawalpindi
- Joyland, Lahore
- Jungle World, Rawalpindi
- Lake View Park, Islamabad
- National Bank Park, Lahore
- Oasis Golf and Aqua Resort, Lahore
- Shakarparian, Islamabad
- Sindbad Amusement Parks
- Sozo Water Park, Lahore
- Botanical Garden Jallo lahore
- Jilani park Lahore
- Greater Iqbal Park Lahore
- Gulshen E Iqbal Park Lahore
- Jallo forest and safari park Lahore
- SS World Family Park Bahawalpur

=== Botanical gardens ===
- Rose and Jasmine Garden, Islamabad

=== National parks ===
- Margalla Hills National Park
- Lal Suhanra National Park

=== Zoological gardens ===
- Islamabad Zoo

=== Mughal gardens ===
- Shalimar Gardens
- Sheikhuora Gardens
- Wah Gardens

== By region ==
=== Abbottabad ===
- Ayubia National Park
- Company Baagh
- Lady Garden - otherwise known as "Cantonment Public Park", or historically, "Lady Gordon's Garden"
- Lalazar Safari Park
- Shimla Hill Park
- Wild Life Park
- World Cedar Park

=== Bahawalpur ===
- Bahawalpur Zoo
- Lal Suhanra National Park
- SS World Family Park

=== Faisalabad ===
- Jinnah Garden
- Gatwala Wildlife Park

=== Gujrat ===
- Shahbaz Shreef Park, Gujrat
- Gujrat Zoo at Shahbaz Shreef Park, Gujrat
- Nawaz Shreef Park, Gujrat
- Ladies and Children Park, Gujrat
- Zahoor Ilahi Park, Jalalpur Jattan, Gujrat

=== Hyderabad ===
- Rani Bagh
- Askari Public Park

=== Islamabad ===
Islamabad has many notable parks and gardens, some of which are listed here:

- Embassy of Argentina, Islamabad
- Aquafun resort
- Centaurus Mall Garden
- Dino Valley Theme Park (Pir Sohawa road)
- Fatima Jinnah Park
- Islamabad Zoo
- Japanese Park
- Lake View Park
- Margalla Hills National Park
- National Herbarium
- Rose and Jasmine Garden
- Shakarparian
- Sukh Chayn F-8 Multipurpose Sports Ground
- Sukh Chayn G-5 Multipurpose Sports Ground

=== Jhelum ===
- Major Akram Shaheed Memorial
- Lehri Nature Park

=== Karachi ===
- The great fiesta water park
- Sunway Lagoon water park
- Cosy water park

=== Khairpur ===
- Herbarium and Botanical Garden, Shah Abdul Latif University

=== Multan ===
- Chenab Park
- Shah Shamas Park

=== Muzaffargarh ===
- Fayyaz Park
- Nawab Muzaffar Khan Park

=== Nowshera ===
- Kund Park

=== Peshawar ===
- Army Stadium
- Chacha Younas Family Park
- Ghani Bagh
- Jinnah Park, Peshawar
- New Army Stadium
- Bagh-e-Naran
- Tatara Park
- Shahi Bagh
- Wazir Bagh

=== Rawalpindi ===
- Ayub National Park
- Jungle World
- Liaquat National Bagh
- Lohi Bher Wildlife Park
- Allama Iqbal Park
- Jinnah Park
- Roomi Park
- 502 (Workshop) Park (also known as Zia Park)
- Playland, adjacent to Ayub National Park
- Army Race Course Ground

=== Sukkur ===
- Lab-e-Mehran

== See also ==
- List of museums in Pakistan
- List of urban parks by size
