= List of parks and gardens in Lahore =

This is a list of popular parks and gardens in Lahore, often called the city of gardens.

== Parks and gardens ==
- Shahdara Bagh
- Shalimar Gardens
- Hazuri Bagh
- Lawrence Garden
- Islamia Park
- Nasir Bagh
- Model Town Park
- Sukh Chayn Gardens
- Jilani Park
- Jam-e-Shirin Park
- National Bank Park
- Oasis Golf and Aqua Resort
- Punjab society park
- Riwaz Garden
- Zaman Park
- Sajawal Park Township Lahore

== Amusement parks ==
Adventure Park, opp Main Gate Bahria Town

- Gulshan Iqbal Park
- Jallo Park
- Jilani Park
- Joyland
- Sozo Water Park
- National Bank Park
- Oasis Golf and Aqua Resort
- Skyland Water Park
- Battlefield Lahore Airport Road
- Baoli Amusement Park

== Botanical gardens ==
- Danishmandan Botanic Garden
- Government College University Botanic Garden
- Lahore Botanical Gardens
- Forman Christian College University Botanical Garden

== Zoological gardens ==
- Changa Manga Wildlife Park
- Jallo Wildlife Park
- Lahore Zoo
- Lahore Zoo Safari (also called Woodland Wildlife Park)

== Gallery ==
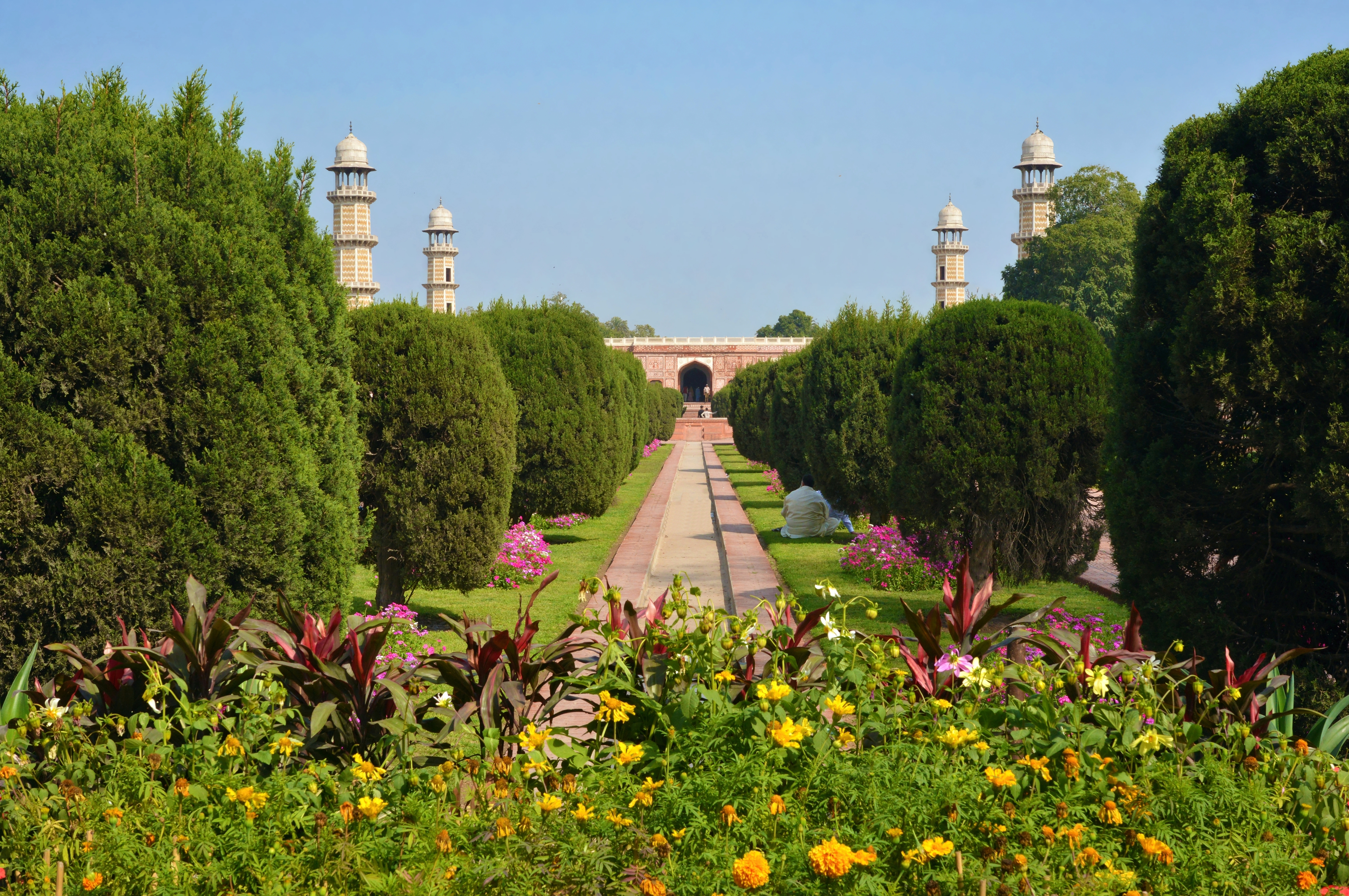
The tomb of Jahangir in Shahdara Bagh.

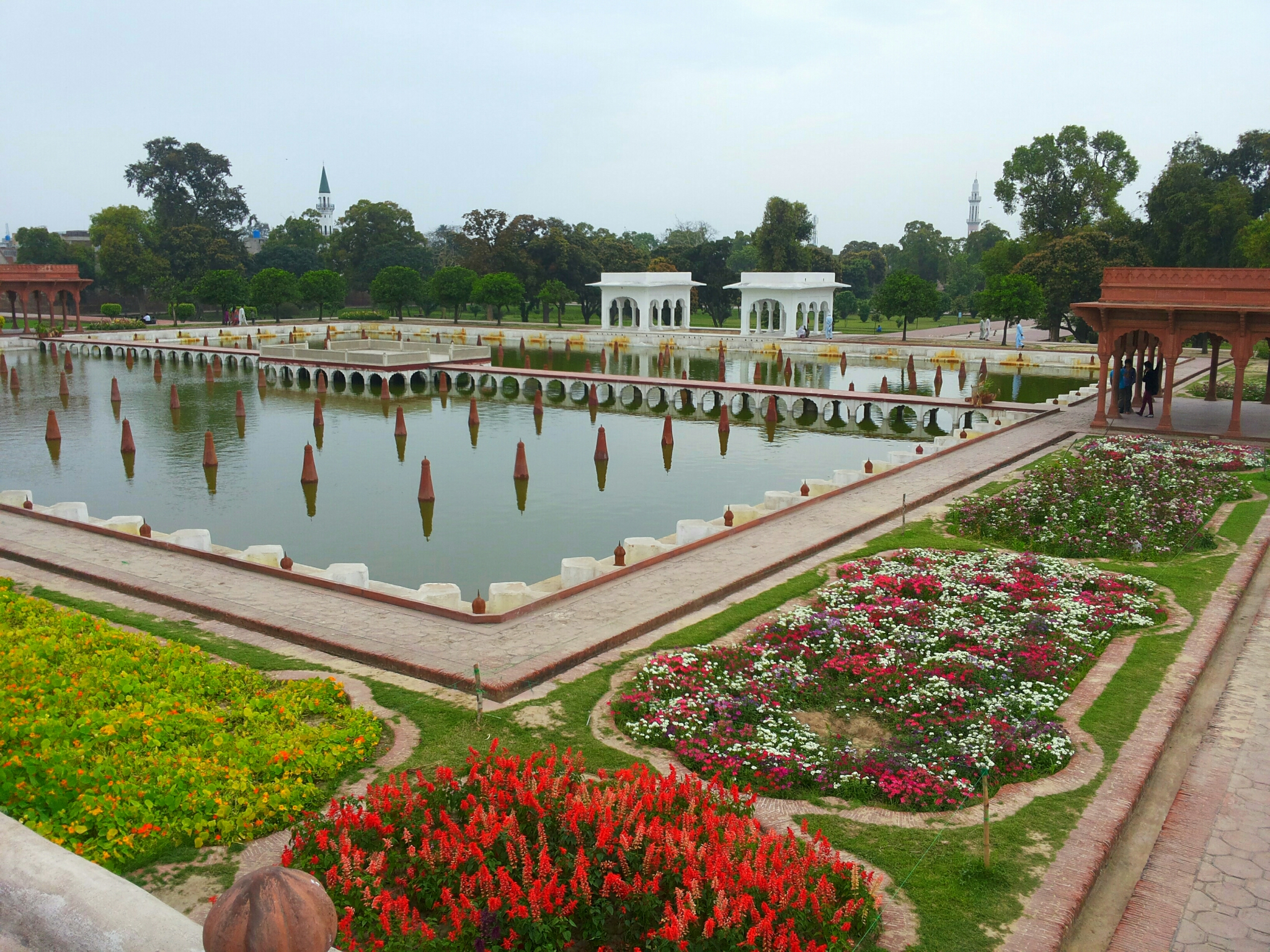
Shalimar Gardens, Lahore

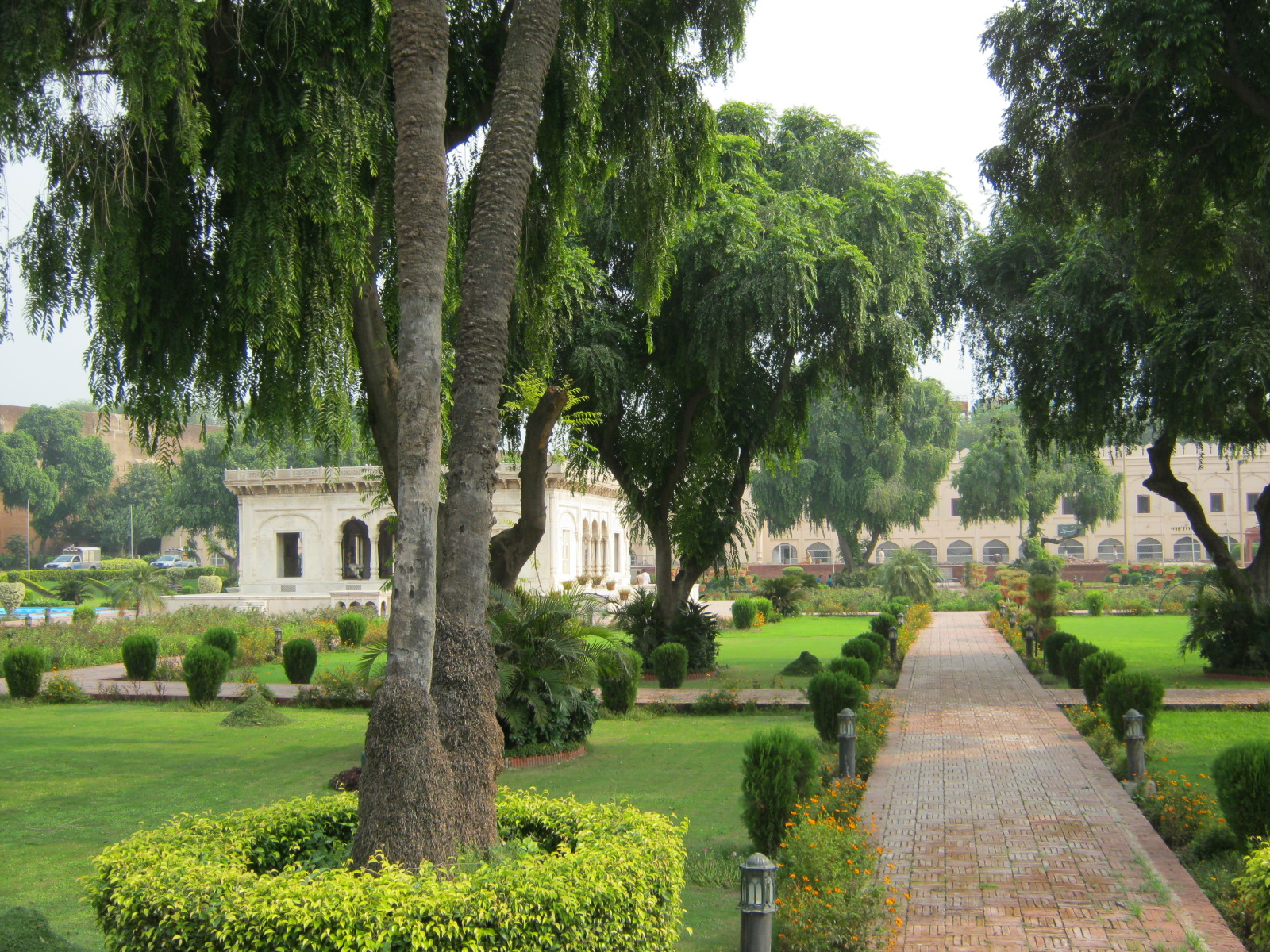
Hazuri Bagh

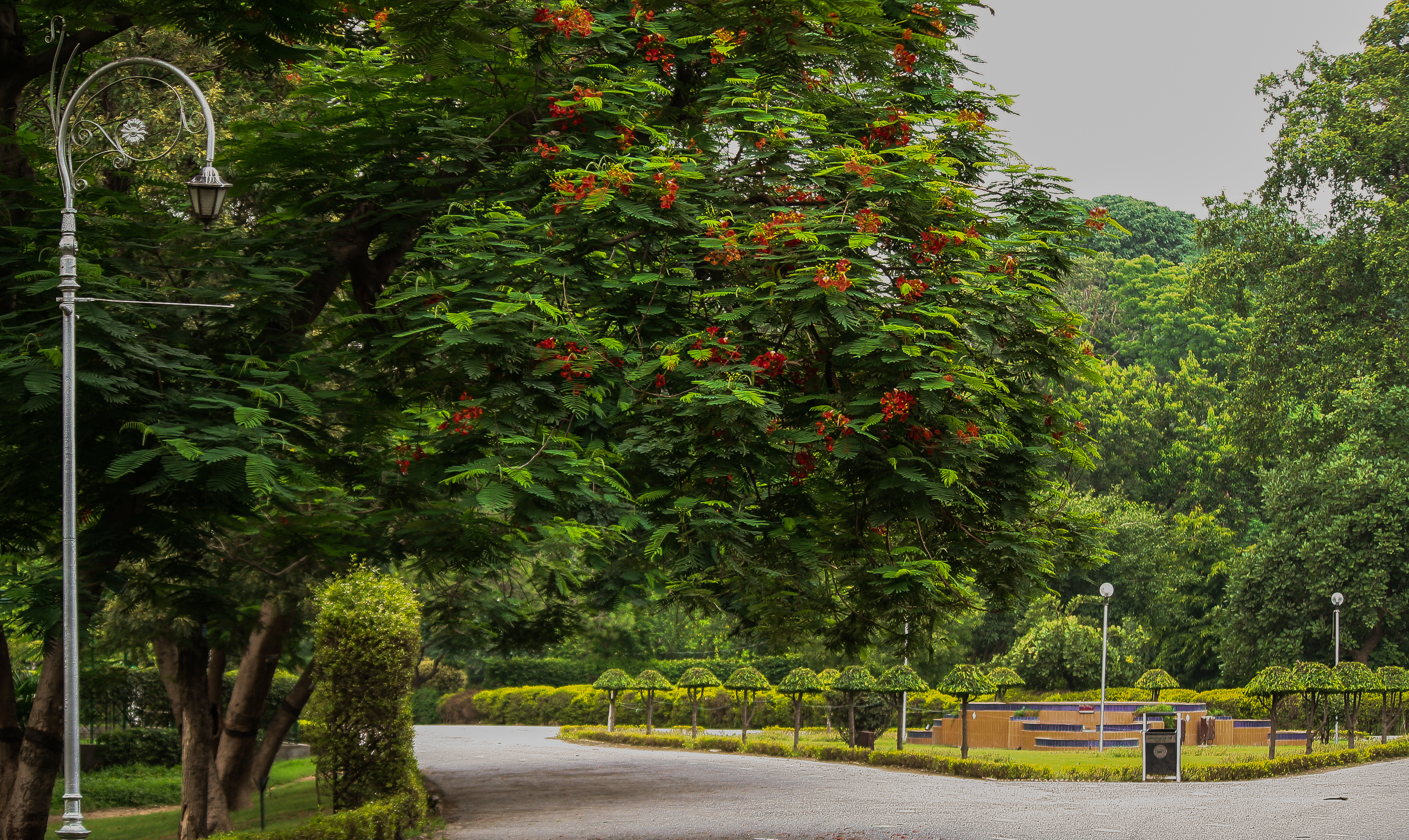
Bagh-e-Jinnah, Lahore

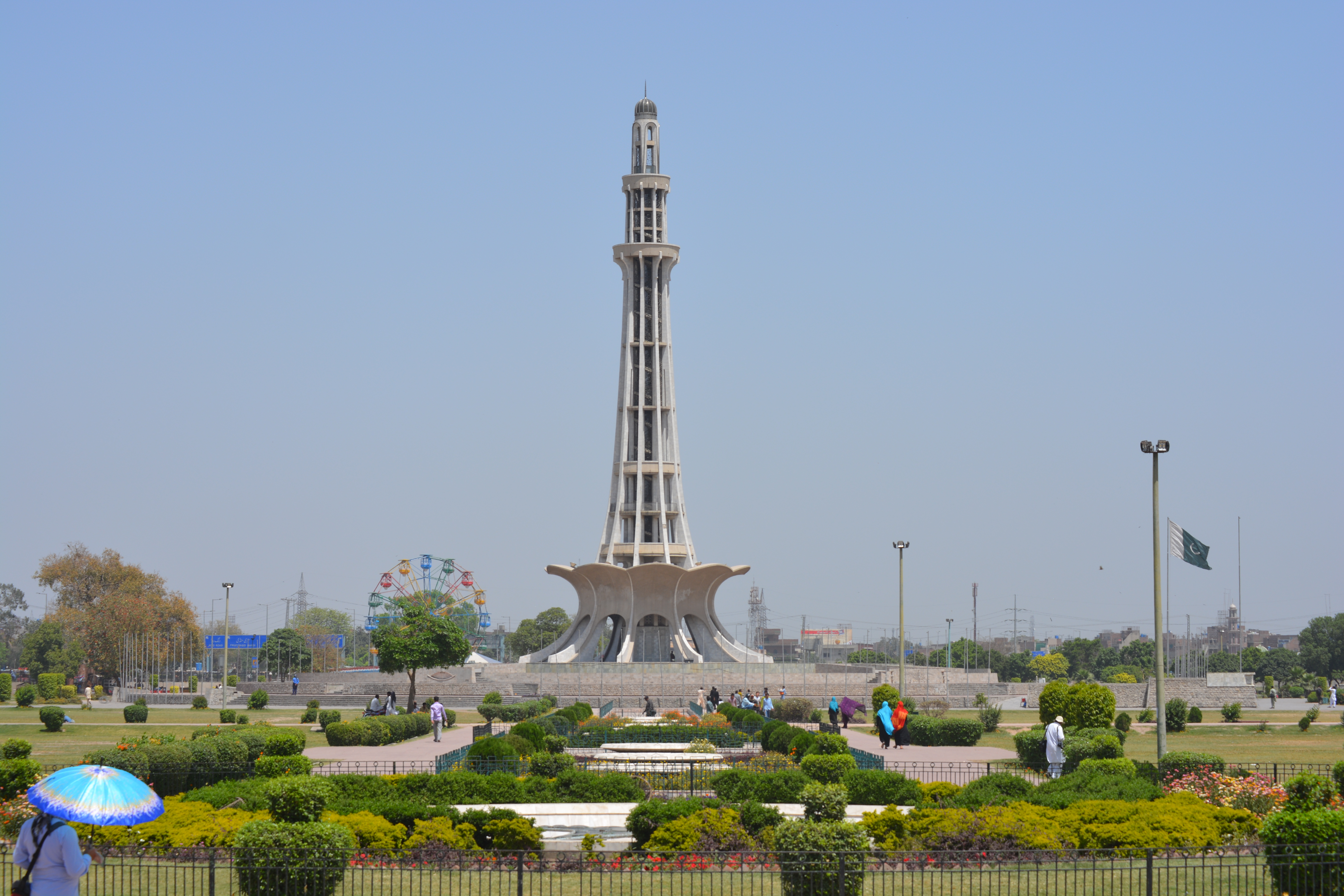
Minar-e-Pakistan in Minto Park

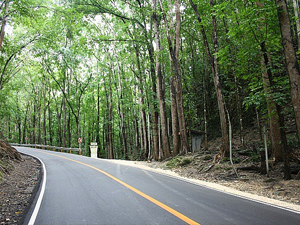
Changa Manga Widlife Park

== See also ==
- List of parks and gardens in Karachi
- List of places in Lahore
- List of sports venues in Lahore
- List of botanical gardens in Pakistan
- List of zoos in Pakistan
- List of parks and gardens in Pakistan
- List of urban parks by size
