= Lake View Park =

Park in Islamabad, Pakistan

- لیک ویو پارک
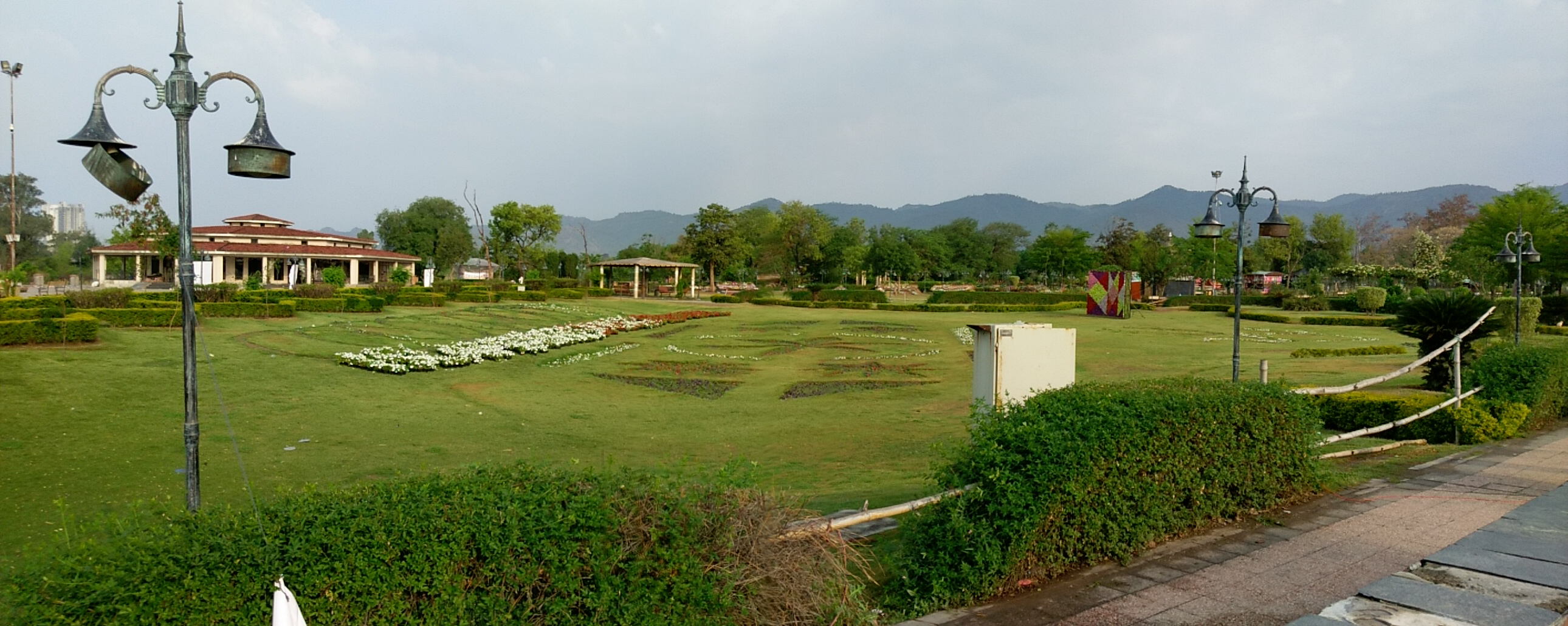
- Interactive map of Lake View Park
- Type: Public
- Coordinates: 33.7150°N 73.1325°E
- Administrator: Capital Development Authority
- Public transit: Lake View Metrobus Station

Lake View Park (also known as Rawal Lake View Point or Rawal Lake Promenade) is a wildlife park, amusement park and adventure park located near Malpur village at the edge of Rawal lake in Islamabad, Pakistan. It runs under the administration of Capital Development Authority. It is considered as a major hub for festivals and events, particularly during spring and winter. Flower exhibitions, bird shows, and national holiday celebrations have drawn tourists to the facility.

The park contains the third-largest walk-in bird aviary in the world, which was inaugurated in 2013. It is 24 m (79 ft) high, and covers 1.5 ha (3.8 acres). 4,000 birds belonging to 300 different species are housed here The recreation park employs more than 230 CDA employees, including cultivators, security personnel, gardeners, and other administrative staff.

== Public services ==
Some of the facilities here include:

- Sitting pagoda
- Picnic point
- Ibex club, rock climbing gym
- Motor sports ranch
- Fancy aviary
- Festival arena
- Passenger road train
- Paintball battlefield
- Boating arena on Saturday
- Fishing area
- Horse riding mobs
- Swimming pool
- Children play area
- Carousel
- M1 Traxx

== See also ==
- List of parks and gardens in Pakistan
- Simly Dam
- Rawal Lake
- Pakistan Monument
- Rose and Jasmine Garden
- Faisal Mosque
- Margalla Hills
