= Islamabad Nature Conservation and Wildlife Management Act 2023 =

- Long title: An Act to provide for the protection, preservation, conservation, and management of nature in the Islamabad Capital Territory
- Status: Current legislation

The Islamabad Nature Conservation and Wildlife Management Act 2023 is an act approved by the Pakistani Parliament. Its purpose is to establish measures ensuring the safeguarding, upkeep, and sustainable administration of the natural environment within the Islamabad Capital Territory. The enactment was specifically introduced to strengthen the safeguards for the Margallah National Wildlife Park, which had been facing persistent challenges due to unregulated urban expansion.

== Objectives ==
The primary aim of the law is to elevate the Margallah National Wildlife Park (MHNP) to global benchmarks. This serves to showcase the nation's capability to meet its international commitments concerning biodiversity and climate change. Additionally, it positions the park to access newfound global funding and assistance opportunities, like Green Funds, dedicated to the safeguarding of biodiversity.

== Provisions ==
As per the recently enacted legislation, it is prohibited to detain wild creatures, cause harm to them, engage in hunting, take their lives, or seize them. Additionally, the utilization of hawks for hunting or dogs for pursuing wild animals is prohibited. The statute also introduces the notion of "Nature" beyond solely wildlife, adopting a comprehensive approach in line with progressive global standards for safeguarding biodiversity.

The introduction of the fresh legal framework follows promptly after the directive from the senate committee for Islamabad's municipal body to halt construction activities on Alexander Road.

== Management ==
The legislation institutes Islamabad Wildlife Management Board (IWMB), granting it authority over both the MHNP and the wildlife in the Islamabad Capital Territory (ICT). Importantly, this Board is independence of the Capital Development Authority (CDA) and cannot be absorbed by it. The Board is also tasked with securing financial stability and continuity by enabling it to generate revenue through fee collection and imposing penalties for contraventions of national park and wildlife regulations, consistent with the precedent set in the legislation of various provinces and Azad Jammu and Kashmir (AJK).
