= Jungle World, Rawalpindi =

- دنیا جنگل، راولپنڈی
- Interactive map of Jungle World, Rawalpindi
- 33.565979°N 73.085324°E
- Location: Ayub National Park, G.T. road, Rawalpindi, Punjab, Pakistan
- Land area: 20 ha
- Website: jungleworld.com.pk

Jungle World (previously Jungle Kingdom) is an animal theme park and zoological garden located in Ayub National Park, Rawalpindi District, Pakistan. The visitor spot is spread over about 200,000 square metres (50 acres).

The Jungle World Theme Park consists of two interconnected facilities - a family amusement park and a zoo.

== Family amusement park ==
The Family Amusement Park portion of Jungle Worincludes an 18-hole Mini Golf Course and rides like Time Shift Machine, Simba Tower, Giant Wheel, Dodgem Cars, Tea Cups, Hully Gully, Miami Ride, Paddle Boats and MonoTrain etc. In addition, the “Mystery House” attraction takes you through a scary 10 mininute walk / trip. Children can also ride on miniature horses and have their photo taken with tamed Macaws and colourful Parrots. Other facilities include:

- Mini golf course
- Indoor snooker
- Bull ride
- Gift shop
- Haunted house (simulated)
- Paddle boats
- Remote-controlled cars
- Dodging cars
- Inflatable bouncers
- Jungle gym
- Video game arcade
- Running water pool

== Zoo ==
The Jungle World has the biggest Zoo in the twin cities of Rawalpindi-Islamabad where wildlife species are kept in large and open air enclosures close to nature. Some of the prominent animals are White Tiger, Bengal Tigers, African Lions, Bears, Puma, Monkeys, Baboons, Vervet, Zebras and variety of Deer. In addition, a variety of birds have been brought from all over the world like Pheasants, Peacocks, Parrots, Ostriches, Emus, Black Swans, Pelicans, Ducks etc. adds beauty to zoo and interest of the visitors.

Wildlife species are displayed in open air enclosures. Each enclosure is landscaped individually to simulate the natural habitat of the species kept there. Peafowls roam freely in the main park area. Other birds include common pheasant, rose-ringed parakeet, ostrich, black swan, mute swan, silver pheasant, vulturine guineafowls, dalmatian pelican and many other types of water birds. Some mammals are Bengal tiger, lion, nilgai, hog deer, black buck, urial, Asiatic black bear, leopard, plains zebra, red kangaroo, llama, red deer and several species of monkeys.

Jungle World is also the primary setting for the critically acclaimed music video for "The Great Unraveling" by internationally renowned rapper and music producer Adil Omar who chose the location based on childhood memories.

== Facilities ==
- Guest rooms
- Red Onion restaurant
- Topi Rakh auditorium

== See also ==
- Ayub National Park
- List of parks and gardens in Pakistan
