= Islamabad Wildlife Management Board =

Pakistani wildlife management and conservation agency

- اسلام آباد وائلڈ لائف مینجمنٹ بورڈ
- Abbreviation: IWMB
- Predecessor: Wildlife Management Board
- Formation: 7 July 2015; 11 years ago
- Type: Governmental
- Purpose: Environmentalism; Conservation; Ecology
- Headquarters: Pir Sohawa Road, Islamabad
- Coordinates: 33°43′59.1″N 73°03′34.7″E
- Region served: Margalla Hills National Park
- Methods: Lobbying; research; consultancy
- Chairperson: Aisha Humera Ch
- Parent organization: Ministry of Climate Change (Pakistan)
- Website: http://iwmb.org.pk/

Islamabad Wildlife Management Board (IWMB) is a Pakistani government body operating under the Ministry of Climate Change. Its mandate is the protection, conservation and management of the Margalla Hills National Park as its legal custodian.

It was set up in 2015 under Section 4 of the Islamabad Wildlife (Protection, Preservation, Conservation and Management) Ordinance 1979. It was officially notified on 7 July 2015 by the Prime Minister of Pakistan.

Aisha Humera Ch has been the chairperson of the board, since 2021.

== History ==
The Federal Government of Pakistan issued the Islamabad Wildlife (Protection, Preservation, Conservation and Management) Ordinance 1979 to protect the environment and wildlife in the Islamabad Capital Territory. The ordinance provided for the establishment of the Margalla Hills National Park (MHNP) in 1980, covering the Margalla Hills, Rawal Lake, and Shakarparian. Moreover, a Wildlife Management Board headed by the Chairman of Capital Development Authority (CDA) and composed of CDA and federal government officials was also notified under this ordinance. This Board, however, was dysfunctional, while the National Park was being managed by the Environment Wing of CDA without oversight.

On 30 September 2014, Z B Mirza, a zoologist and field expert, filed a petition in the Islamabad High Court, calling to attention the poor condition of the MHNP. A meeting attended by Mirza, the Cabinet Division, and CDA officials led to a discussion of the Board, and the resulting recommendations were sent to the federal government. As a result, the Islamabad Wildlife Management Board (IWMB) was notified on 7 July 2015. Dr. Anis-ur-Rehman was appointed the Chairman via a Cabinet Division notification on 10 August 2015.

== See also ==
- Islamabad Nature Conservation and Wildlife Management Act 2023
