= Lehri Nature Park =

Park in Pakistan

Lehri Nature Park is situated in Jhelum District, Punjab, Pakistan. The park is almost 90 kilometres on GT Road in the hilly region from Islamabad and almost 40 kilometres from Jhelum City. It is 10 kilometres from GT Road. The park has lodgings for the night. It is named after the Union Council of the village Lehri. The residents of Lehri village are mainly the descendants of the Gakhar tribe of the Pothohar region in Pakistan.

It is spread over 6,900 hectares (17,000 acres) and is covered with phulai (Senegalia modesta), sanatha (Dodonaea viscosa) and wild olive.

== See also ==
- List of parks and gardens in Pakistan
