= Yogi Haider =

Pakistani yoga teacher and meditation instructor

- Born: Shamshad Haider; August 19, 1969 (age 57); Phalia, Mandi Bahauddin District, Punjab, Pakistan
- Occupations: Yoga teacher, Meditation instructor, Wellness advocate
- Known for: Founder of Yoga Pakistan, Way of Nature, Self Discovery Art
- Website: yogihaider.org

Yogi Haider (born Shamshad Haider; 19 August 1969) is a Pakistani yoga teacher, meditation instructor, and wellness advocate from Phalia, Mandi Bahauddin District, Punjab, Pakistan. He is the founder of Yoga Pakistan, Way of Nature, and Self Discovery Art (SDA). He is widely regarded as a leading figure in promoting yoga and meditation across Pakistan, operating centres in Islamabad, Rawalpindi, Lahore, and Karachi.

== Early life ==
Shamshad Haider was born on 19 August 1969 in Phalia, a town in Mandi Bahauddin District, Punjab Province, Pakistan. He grew up in a traditional Pakistani family involved in the construction business.

In his early adulthood, Haider worked in Saudi Arabia in the family construction business. While there, he experienced a health problem and began reading books on mind science. This experience sparked his interest in alternative health and self-healing, eventually leading him toward yoga and meditation.

== Education and training ==
Driven by his interest in holistic health, Haider travelled across Asia to study yoga and meditation. He studied in Nepal (1994–1996), India (1997), Tibet, and Burma (Myanmar), and also trained with Guru Nikam in Maharashtra, India.

His most significant influence was S. N. Goenka (1924–2013), the Myanmar-born master of Vipassana meditation. Haider attended Goenka's meditation courses in India, an experience he has described as transformative.

Haider's expertise includes Hatha Yoga, Kundalini Yoga, Pranayam Yoga, and numerous meditation techniques rooted in ancient Eastern traditions. He returned to Pakistan in 2004 and began teaching.

== Career ==
=== Yoga Pakistan ===
Yoga Pakistan is Haider's primary organization, founded to promote yoga and its health benefits across Pakistan. Through this platform, Haider and a network of over 500 certified instructors offer yoga sessions in parks and public spaces across Islamabad, Rawalpindi, Lahore, and Karachi. Classes include both free and paid sessions, making yoga accessible to people from all economic backgrounds.

=== Way of Nature ===
Way of Nature, established in 2005 and headquartered at Ayub Park, Rawalpindi, was Haider's first large-scale yoga initiative in Pakistan. The organization focused on connecting urban Pakistanis with nature-based wellness practices through outdoor morning yoga sessions in public parks.

=== Self Discovery Art ===
Self Discovery Art (SDA) is an advanced program offering workshops and training designed to bring about transformation in participants' mindsets and personal wellness. SDA combines yoga, meditation, and ancient Eastern health practices.

== Teaching philosophy ==
Haider is notable for his efforts to reconcile yoga with Islamic culture, addressing widespread misconceptions in Pakistan that yoga is a Hindu religious practice. He frames yoga as a universal science and shared heritage of the East, stating: "Yoga has no religion, neither Hindu nor Muslim. It is our common heritage, an art, and a science. This is the property of the East."

He has also stated that yoga can serve as a bridge between India and Pakistan, referencing their shared South Asian cultural heritage that predates Partition.

== Notable students ==
Haider's students include prominent Pakistani public figures:

- Qaim Ali Shah — former Chief Minister of Sindh
- Ghulam Mustafa Khar — former Governor of Punjab
- Maulana Tariq Jameel — prominent Islamic scholar and preacher

== Impact ==
As of 2023, Haider's network includes over 50 yoga clubs across Pakistan, with more than 50,000 practitioners attending sessions led by around 500 trained instructors.

A 2025 academic paper titled "Disrupting Monoliths: Yogi Haider's Localization of Yoga in Pakistan" examined how Haider uses social media to localize yoga for Pakistani audiences by incorporating poetry, spatial markers, and historical elements.
