= Jilani Park =

Park in Lahore, Pakistan

Jilani Park جیلانی پارک ریس کورس پارک
- Race Course Park
- جیلانی پارک ریس کورس پارک
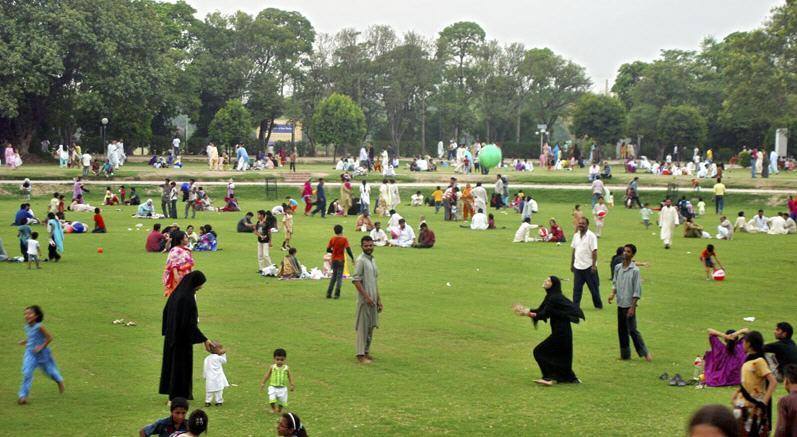
- Interactive map of Jilani Park جیلانی پارک ریس کورس پارک
- Type: Urban park
- Location: Lahore, Punjab, Pakistan
- Coordinates: 31°32′28″N 74°20′17″E
- Area: 0.36 km2 (88 acres)
- Created: October 3, 1985
- Founder: Governor Ghulam Jilani Khan
- Administrator: Parks and Horticulture Authority
- Status: Open

Jilani Park (formerly known as Race Course Park) is located in the city of Lahore, Punjab, Pakistan. It is situated on the Jail Road in front of the Services Hospital. It is known for its floral exhibitions and artificial waterfall and also for holding various annual festivals. Annual horse racing competitions are held in this park. There is also a famous restaurant inside the park called 'Polo Lounge'. It is named after Ghulam Jilani Khan.

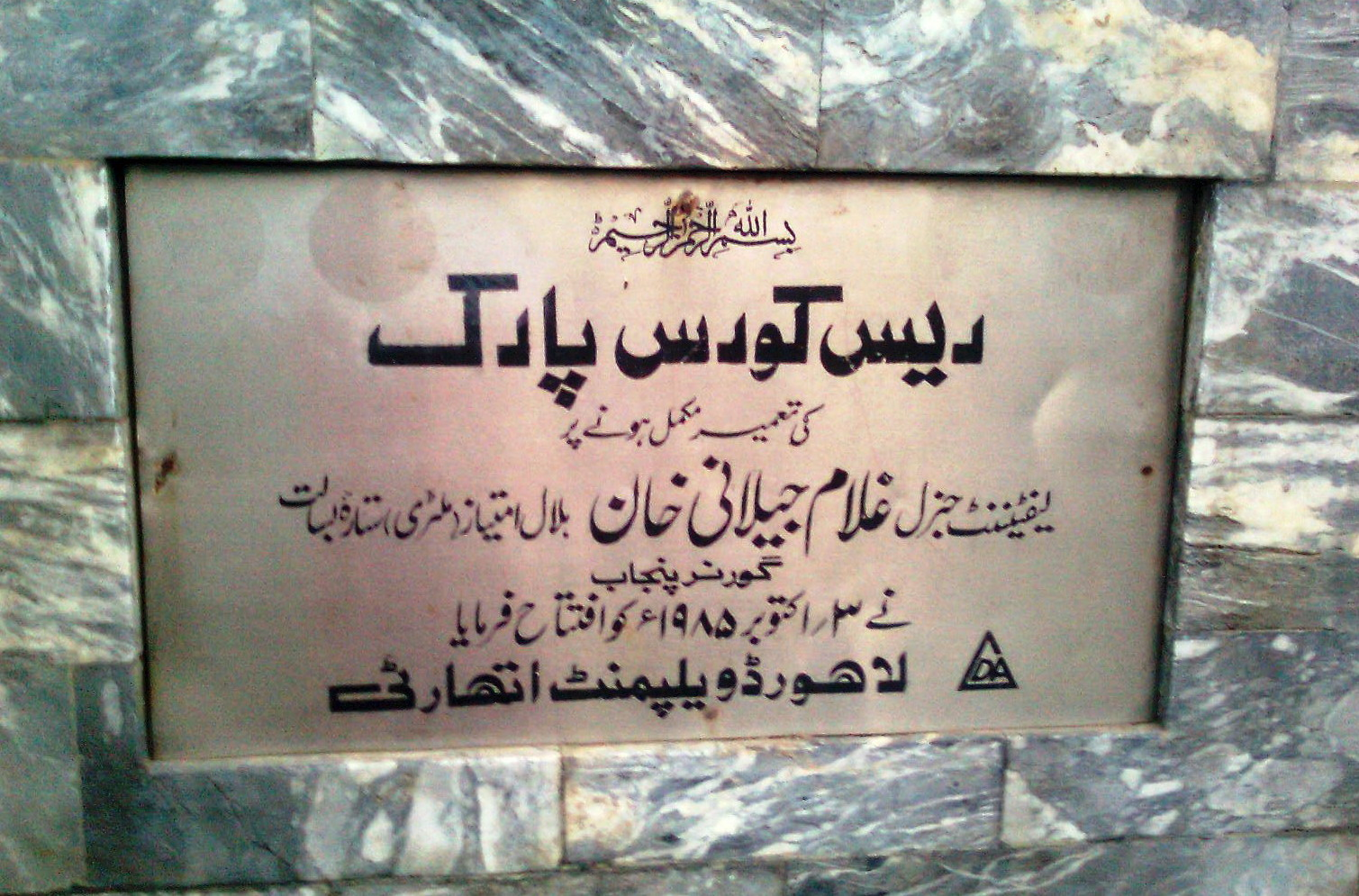
An inscription in the park by Lahore Development Authority.

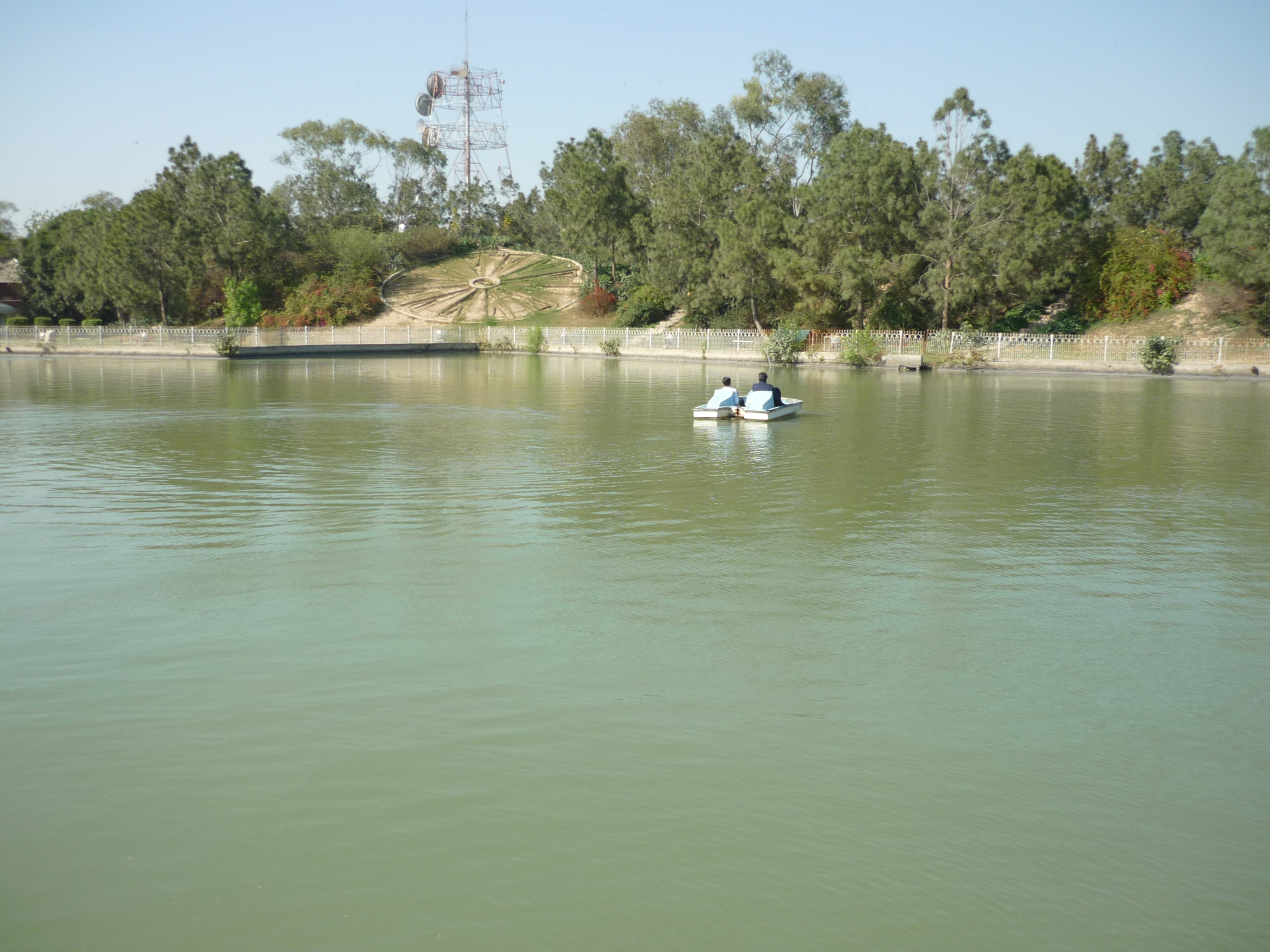
A view of lake in the park.

== See also ==
- Lahore Race Club
- List of parks and gardens in Lahore
- List of parks and gardens in Pakistan
- List of parks and gardens in Karachi
