= Model Town Park =

Family park and also a golf course located in Model Town, Lahore, Pakistan

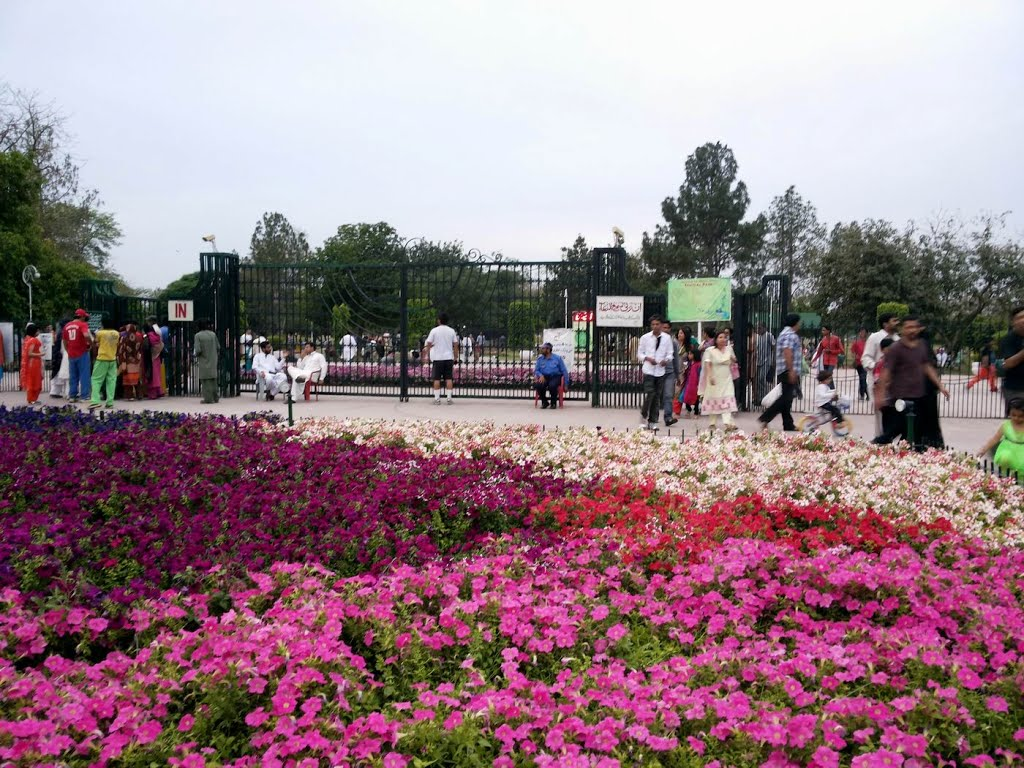
- Location: Model Town, Pakistan
- Established: 1985

The Model Town Park is located in Model Town, Pakistan. It was developed in 1985 by then Governor of Punjab, Ghulam Jilani Khan. It has 2.0 km jogging tracks.

Space for this park was earmarked in the original plans in 1920s. Till 1984 it was solid waste, and night soil burial ground. At that time it was a good solution because this waste was all organic waste. As a result, the salinity in the area was eliminated by the soil improvement through addition of organic waste. By 1985, planned landscaping took place.

== Walkway and Jogging track ==
The length of the walkway of hard tiles is 5.5 km while the jogging track is completely made of clay and its length is approximately 2.0 km and it is one of the larger jogging tracks in Asia which is made up of pure mud and clay only clay. And its maintenance is done properly and is watered 3 times a day. In the morning, evening and at night.

== See also ==
- List of parks and gardens in Lahore
- List of parks and gardens in Pakistan
- List of sports venues in Lahore
- List of parks and gardens in Karachi
