= Rose and Jasmine Garden =

Garden in Islamabad, Pakistan

- باغ گل و یاسمن
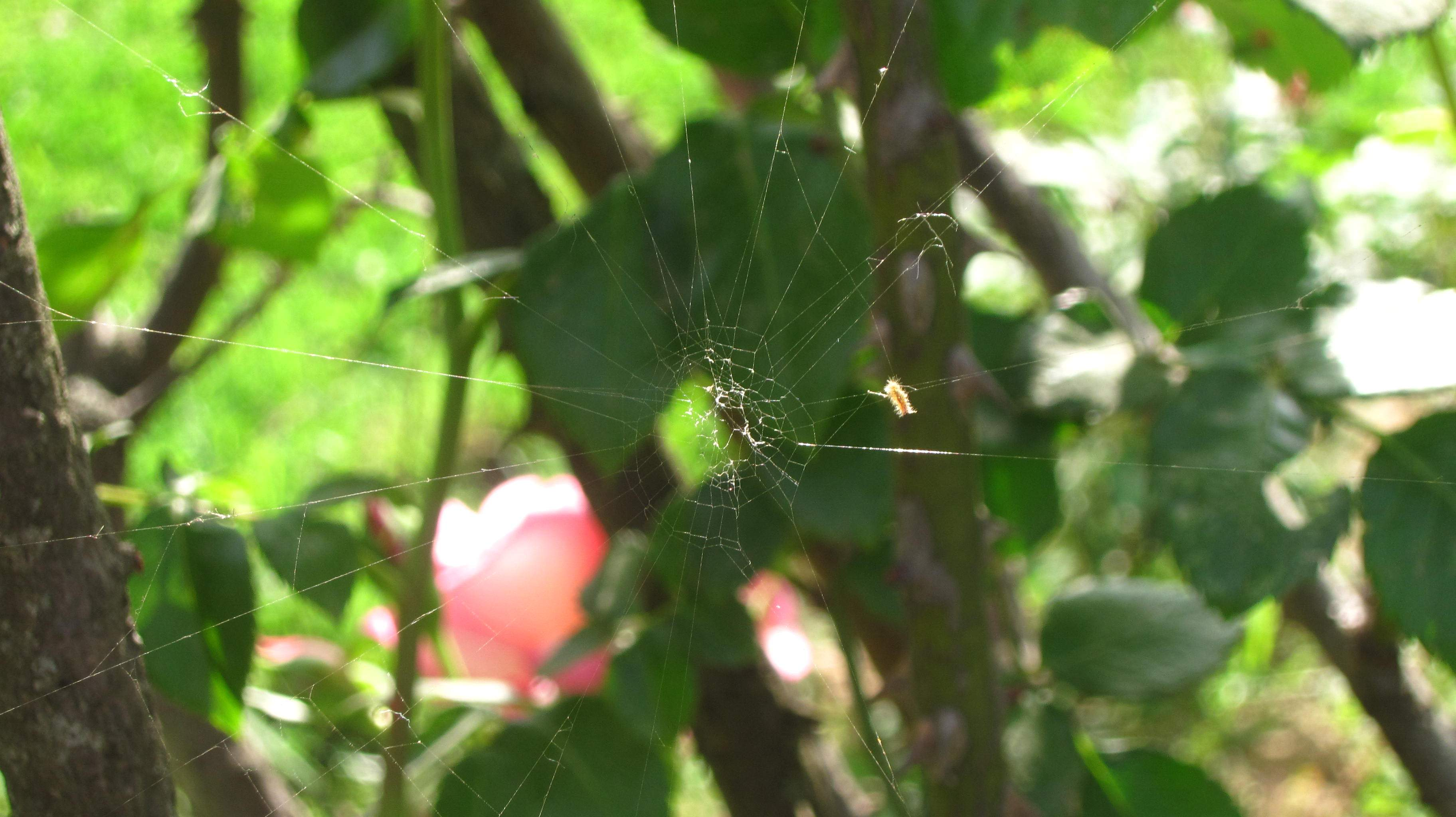
- A view inside the garden
- Interactive map of Rose and Jasmine Garden
- Type: Public garden
- Location: Shakarparian, Islamabad, Pakistan
- Coordinates: 33°42′6″N 73°5′20″E
- Area: 202,360 m^{2} (20.236 ha)
- Created: 1948
- Operator: Capital Development Authority
- Status: Open year-round
- Species: ≈ 250 rose varieties 150 jasmine species

Rose and Jasmine Garden is a public garden located in the recreational area of Shakarparian near Sports Complex Aabpara, on Kashmir Highway in Islamabad, Capital Territory, Pakistan. The garden spans 20,360 square meters and is known for its extensive collection of roses, featuring approximately 250 distinct varieties. In addition to roses, it also hosts about 150 species of jasmine.

Seasonal flower shows are occasionally organized at the garden, especially during the spring.

== History ==
Established in 1948, a year after the creation of Pakistan, the garden was originally known as the Government Rose Garden. It was later renamed to reflect the inclusion of jasmine varieties alongside its notable rose collection.

The garden runs under the administration of Capital Development Authority. It contains various varieties of flowers and herbs in it, especially roses and jasmines. The garden also boasts a collection of other colorful flowers such as marigolds, petunias, and daisies. It is located near Pakistan-China center. People who visit Pakistan Monument and Shakarparian also pay visit to this garden.

The 44th annual spring flower show, a three-day event, was held in April 2025 at the Islamabad Rose and Jasmine Garden in collaboration with the National Horticultural Society of Pakistan (NHSP) and the Capital Development Authority (CDA).

== Public services ==
Some of the facilities here include:

- Sitting
- Picnic point
- Walking and running track
- Cycling track
- Cafeteria (Dhaba)
- Parking area

== See also ==
- List of parks and gardens in Pakistan
