= Margalla Hills National Park =

National park in Islamabad, Pakistan

- مارگلہ پہاڑیاں قومی پارک
- IUCN category V (protected landscape/seascape)
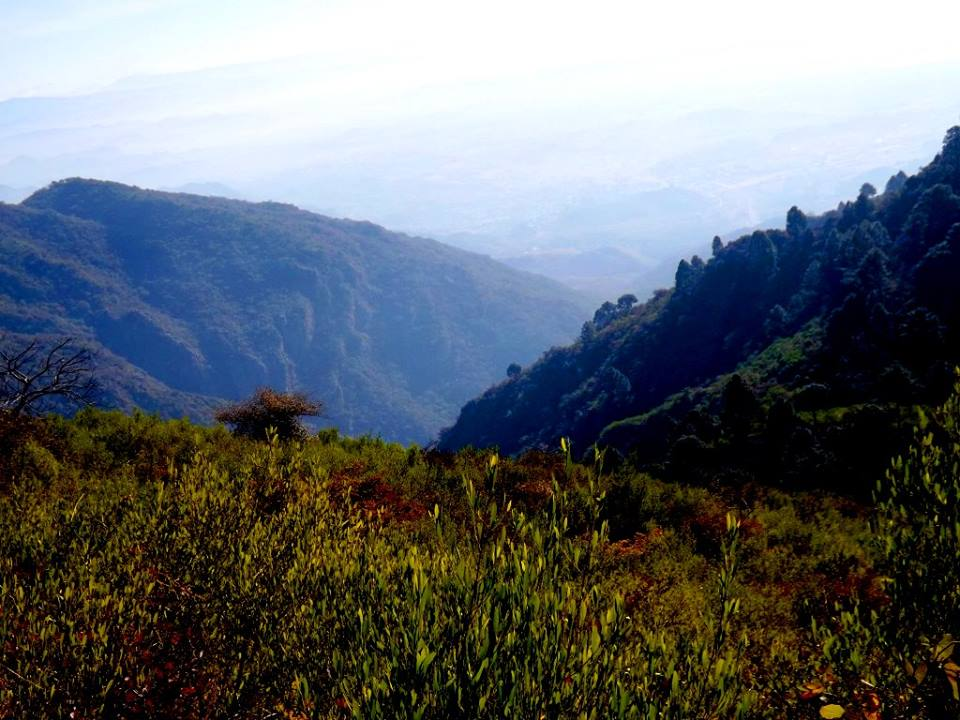
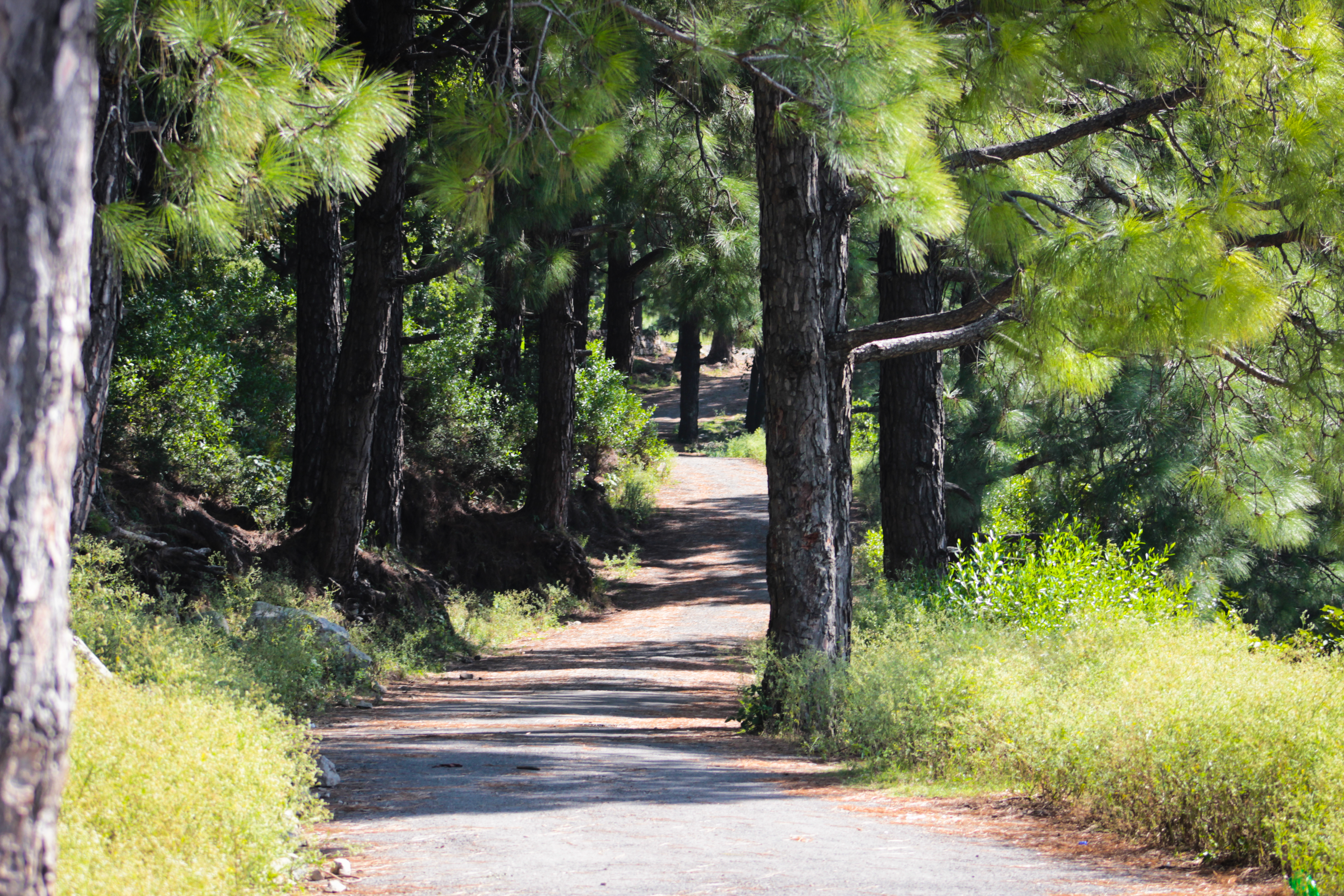
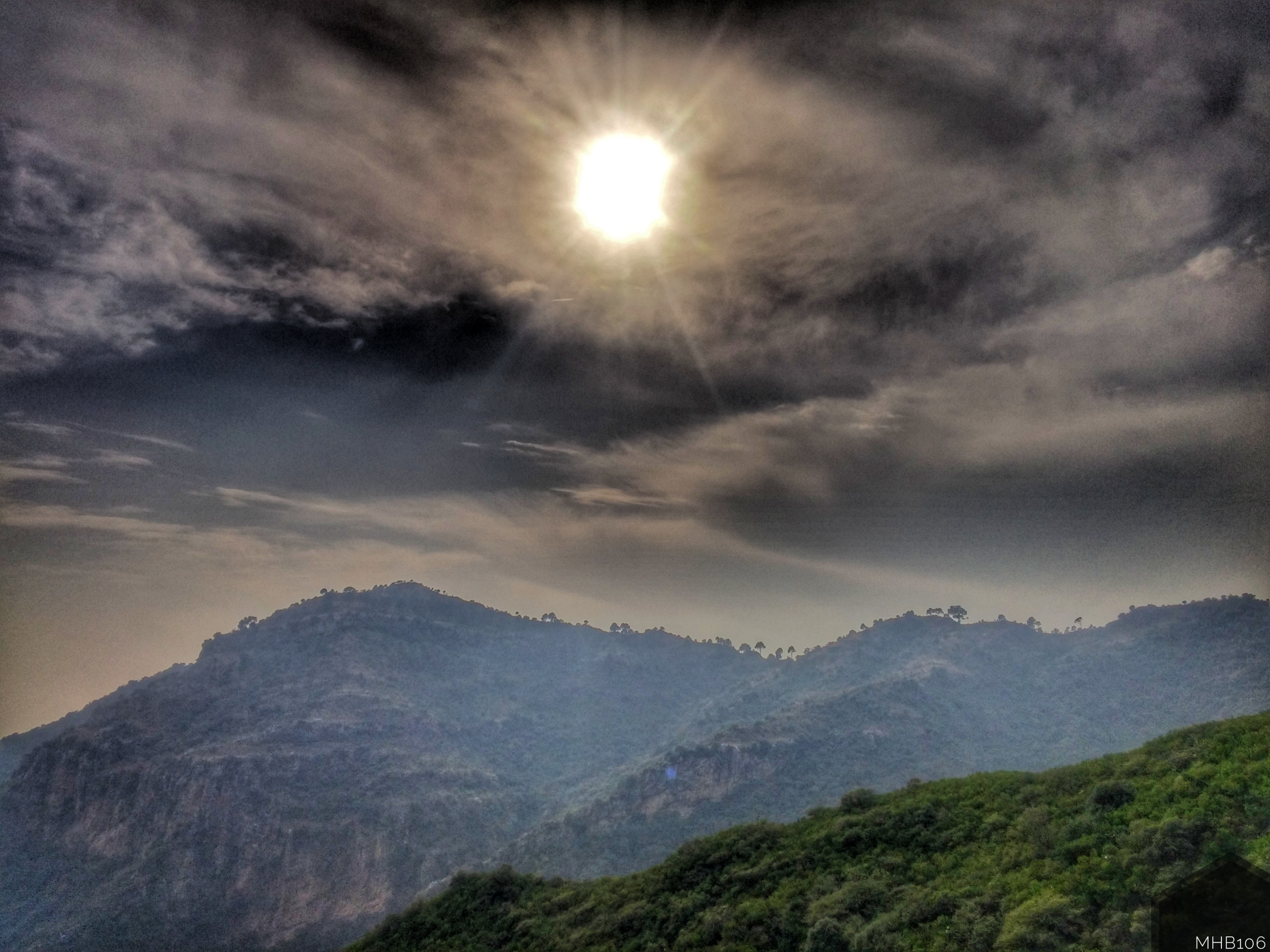
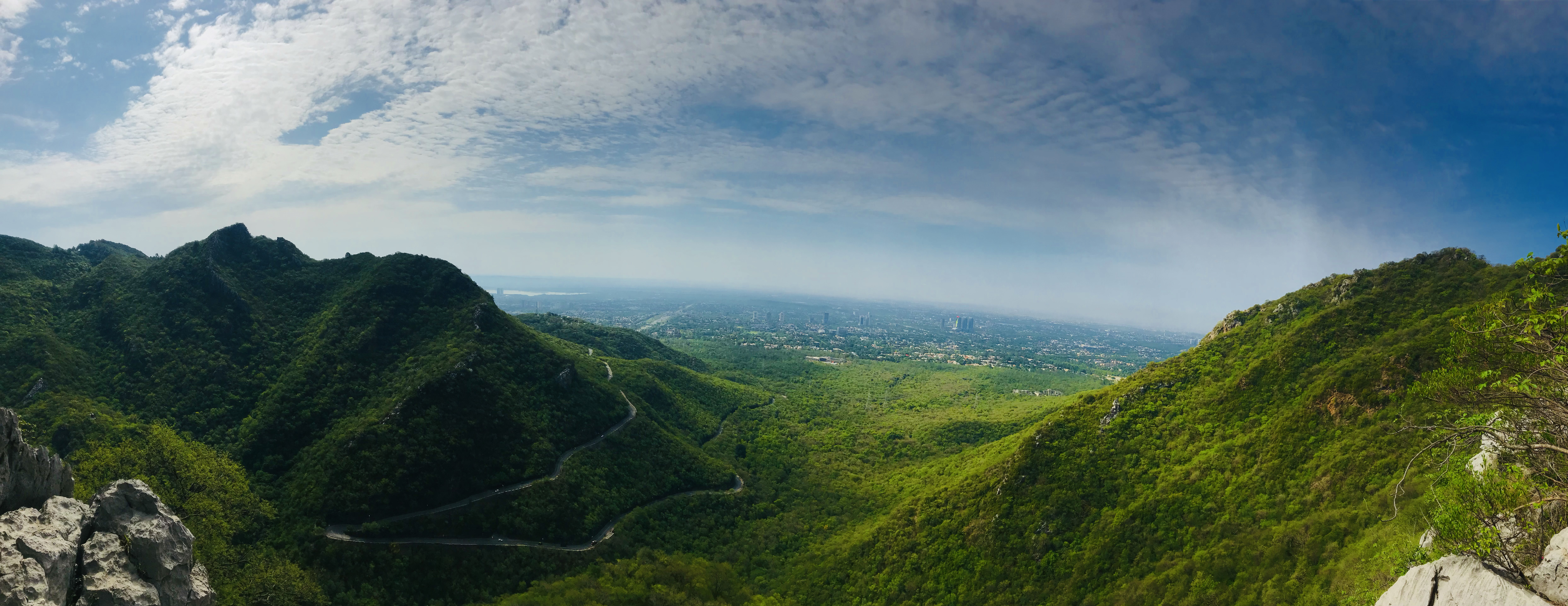
- Clockwise from left: A view of Margalla Hills, Sunrise, Panoramic view of Margalla Hills, Hiking trail in Margalla Hills National Park
- Interactive map of Margalla Hills National Park
- Location: Northern Pakistan
- Nearest city: Islamabad
- Coordinates: 33°43′52″N 72°56′13″E
- Area: 17,386 hectares (42,960 acres)
- Established: 1980; 46 years ago
- Governing body: Islamabad Wildlife Management Board
- Website: iwmb.org.pk

Margalla Hills National Park (Urdu: مارگلہ پہاڑیاں قومی پارک) is a national park in Pakistan located in Islamabad Capital Territory, near its northern boundary with Haripur District, Khyber Pakhtunkhwa. The park includes the Margalla Hills, which form the foothills of the Himalayas, along with Shakarparian Park and Rawal Lake.

Established in 1980, it is the third-largest national park in Pakistan with an area of 17,386 hectares (42,960 acres). Tilla Charouni, with a height of 1604 m, is tallest peak in the park. The Park is a major tourist destination, with Daman-e-Koh and Pir Sohawa serving as popular hill stations, while the Monal Restaurant, Shakarparian Cultural Complex, and Lake View Park are popular picnic spots.

The park is rich in biodiversity, especially rich in Sino-Himalayan fauna, most notably gray goral, barking deer and the leopard. Combined, MHNP is home to around 600 plant species, 402 bird varieties, 38 mammals, and 27 species of reptiles. PTDC is currently constructing a chairlift project in the park.

== Location ==
Instituted in 1980, the Margalla Hills National Park comprises the Margalla Hills (12605 hectares), the Rawal Lake, and Shakarparian Sports and Cultural complex. Located in Islamabad, the capital of Pakistan. The hill range nestles between an elevation of 685 meters at the western end and 1,604 meters on its east.

In November 2026, the area encompassing Rawal Lake and bounded by Srinagar Highway/Murree Road in the north, Club Road/Murree Road in the west, Park Road in the south, proposed Murree Link Road in the east, and a 200-metre buffer along both sides of Korang River up to two kilometres upstream of Rawal Lake, and south-east of Korang Road was redefined as the protected area after the federal government approved an amendment to zoning regulations and delineation for Rawal Lake. Following this decision, a part of the Lake View portion of the park and buildings constructed on Constitution Avenue are no longer part of Zone III.

== Paleontology ==
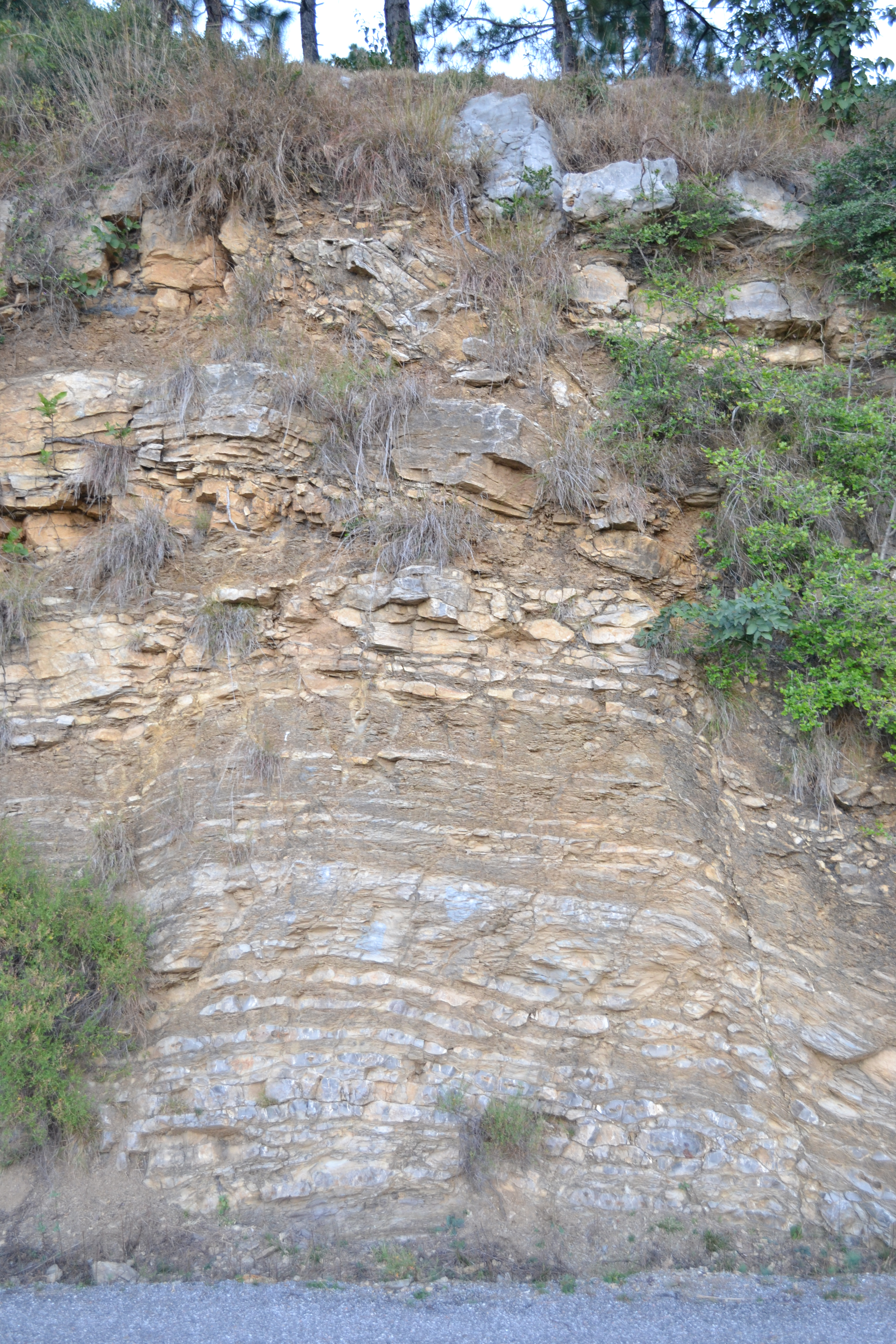
Rock layers below Tilla Charouni the highest peak in Margalla Hills

It is a clear indication that before the content collision around 40 to 50 million years ago, these hills were the seabed of the ancient ocean. Fossils of seashells, plants, petrified wood and early sea life Yorgia waggoneri are abound.

These hills are the starting point of the Himalayas. The Himalayas, which stretch some 2,900 kilometers between Pakistan, India, China, and Nepal, is the world’s tallest mountain range.

== Flora and fauna ==
Margalla Hills have a number of torrents which gush down in the monsoon. Natural springs are also present. Margalla has a variety of mammals, which include:

- Indian leopard
- Jungle cat
- Leopard cat
- Central Asian boar
- Golden jackal
- White-footed fox
- Rhesus macaque
- Grey goral
- Muntjac (barking deer)
- Chinkara
- Indian pangolin
- Indian crested porcupine
- Yellow-throated marten
- Fruit-bat
- Indian flying fox
- Indian grey mongoose
- Javan mongoose
- Indian hedgehog
- Masked palm civet
- Asian palm civet
- Northern palm squirrel
- Kashmir flying squirrel
- Murree vole (endemic to Margalla Hills, Murree and Khyber Pakhtunkhwa)

It is also home to a large number of birds such as Himalayan vulture, laggar falcon, peregrine falcon, common kestrel, Eurasian sparrowhawk, Egyptian vulture, white-eared bulbul, yellow-vented bulbul, paradise flycatcher, black partridge, cheer pheasant, kalij pheasant, golden oriole, spotted dove, Eurasian collared dove, Eurasian skylark, steppe grey shrike, desert wheatear, white-capped bunting, crested bunting, common reed bunting, and rock bunting.

Reptiles such as the Russell's viper, Indian cobra, Himalayan pit viper, and saw-scaled viper are found here.

=== Flora ===
Margalla Hills in Islamabad have been declared as a National Park since 1980 to conserve the existing flora and fauna. The selection of trees and shrubs species for plantation in Margalla Hills is limited to natural trees and plants species which include:

- Chir Pine (Pinus roxburghii)
- Olive (Olea ferruginea)
- Phulai (Senegalia modesta)
- Celtis (Celtis asustralis)
- Snatha (Dodonaea viscosa)

Major flowering trees include:

- Sumbal (Bombax ceiba)
- Dhak (Butea monosperma)
- Pear (Pyrus pashia)
- Kachnar (Bauhinia variegata)
- Roxburgh fig (Ficus auriculata)
- Red cedar (Toona ciliata)
- Java plum (Syzygium cumini)
- Cluster fig (Ficus racemosa)
- Amla (Phyllanthus emblica)
- Woodfordia (Woodfordia fruticosa)
- Jasmine (Jasminum humile)
- Holmskioldia (Holmskiodia sanguine)

== Tourism, trekking and sports ==
The National Park is the most accessible in Pakistan due to its close proximity to the national capital, Islamabad. It is a significant hub for bird lovers throughout the year. There are several hiking trails (Trail 1, Trail 2, Trail 3, Trail 4, Trail 5, Trail 6, Trail 7 (Shah Allah Dittah)), with the most frequented being Trail 3 and Trail 5.

=== Rock climbing ===
There are many spots for rock climbing in Margalla Hills. Few crags have been developed but there is still a lot of potential available to explore virgin lines.

For beginner level climbers, the following crags are suggested:

Name of crag	Number of Pitches	Difficulty Level	Average Height
Jasmine Corner (Margalla Hills)	3	Beginner Level	15 meters
Musical Lounge	2	Beginner to Intermediate Level	18 meters
Saidpur Village	2	Beginner Level	15 meters
Shahdra Wall	4	Beginner to Intermediate Level	13 meters
Shah Allah Dittah	2	Beginner to expert Level	15 meters

Although sport climbing is becoming increasingly popular among the youth of Rawalpindi and Islamabad, only few local climbers can climb at an advanced level. Therefore, most of the crags remain uncrowded.

=== Illegal Construction ===
Considered the most attractive spot by many on the Margalla Hills National Park was the famous Monal and LaMontana restaurant, which used to offers scenic view of Islamabad. Despite heavy public backlash, It was demolished in 2024 by order of Supreme Court of Pakistan.

== See also ==
- Protected areas of Pakistan
- List of urban parks by size
