= Sozo Water Park =

Water park in Lahore, Pakistan

- Interactive map of Sozo Water Park
- Coordinates: 31°35′39″N 74°29′11″E
- Opened: May 28, 1987
- Status: Operating

Sozo Water Park (Urdu: پارک آبی سوزو) is a water park located in Lahore, Punjab, Pakistan, opened in 1987. It is the largest water park in Pakistan

== History ==
The water park first opened on May 28, 1987 on the Muslim holiday of Eid al-Fitr. The name of the park came from the Greek word Sozo, meaning "salvation". Trip Advisor says it is the best water park in Lahore "to beat the scorching heat."

Sozo Water Park is the largest water park in Pakistan. It has parking for 1,000 vehicles and offers to host events for up to 10,000 people. The waterpark is located in Lahore, Punjab, Pakistan, and is one of the few water-themed amusement parks in the city of Lahore. It has a separate section for women.

== Water rides ==
The park has three pools and many waterslides. There is also a large bucket called "Balti", which every few minutes pours water down on visitors. The park also includes swings. Cleanliness of the facility is paramount there.

The Bullet Drop water slide was added in 2021, imported at a cost of Rs150,000,000 and the first of its kind in Pakistan.

== Animal attractions ==
Sozo Water Park also once had an animal attraction featuring dolphins. During the fall of 2019 four dolphins imported from Ukraine died at the park.

== Park safety ==
In 2004 three children and two teachers were killed when a merry-go-round ride at the park collapsed. Forty-seven other students were also injured. Authorities learned that the park had not maintained the merry-go-round since its installation. The Citizens' Commission for Human Development blamed the accident on "negligence on the part of the government and the park management". However, later study showed the ride had only been there two months, and attributed its failure to a design defect in the axle and load-bearing structures, not a lack of maintenance.

The park draws its water through "three housing societies, eight squatter settlements and a slum", which has created health issues at the park. It has been cited as an example of "water mismanagement".

== See also ==
- List of parks and gardens in Lahore
- List of parks and gardens in Pakistan
