= Lab-e-Mehran =

Garden in Sukkur, Pakistan

Coordinates: 27.68673°N 68.85162°E

- Interactive map of Lab-e-Mehran
- Type: Entertainment
- Location: Indus River, adjacent to the Sukkur Barrage, Sindh, Pakistan
- Nearest city: Sukkur
- Established: 1965
- Administered by: Sukkur District administration

Lab-e-Mehran is a park in Sukkur, Pakistan. It is situated on the right bank of Indus River, adjacent to the Sukkur Barrage. It was built at a cost of 120 million rupees.

== History ==
The Barrage Division of the Irrigation Department, Sindh was assigned to build the Lab-e-Mehran Park and the opening ceremoney was held in 1965. In 2004, the then-Chief Minister of Sindh, announced an amount of Rs. 12 crores for its restoration and renovation. The project's initial phase was finished at a cost of Rs. 10 million. The sitting Chief Minister of Sindh performed the ceremony for the second phase of the project, which cost Rs. 15 million, on January 30, 2006.

In 2021, the Supreme Court of Pakistan rejected a petition of the Sukkur Municipal Corporation to take over management of the Labe Mehran Park.

== Facilities ==
The park offers several facilities for visiting families such as a boat ride across flowing water, a small food cafe, and a fun-land with swings and slides. The park is filled with trees and flowers, as well as benches for visitors to sit on and walking and running paths. There is a walking path next to Circuit House Sukkur. Another nearby view is of the World Globe that has been constructed near the roundabout. The project was architected by the artist Jamal Shah.
