= Lalazar Safari Park =

Zoo in Nathiagali, Murree, Pakistan

- Location: Lalazar mountain top, Nathiagali, Murree, Pakistan

Lalazar Safari Park is a park located on the Lalazar mountain top at a height of 2743 metres in Nathiagali, Murree. Most of the wildlife in Murree is based in this park.

It is part of Ayubia National Park.

== Summer resort ==
The park also acts like a summer resort and some rare animals such as snow leopard and bird species can be found there.
