= Sukh Chayn Gardens =

Sukh Chayn Gardens سکھ چین باغ
- Housing estate
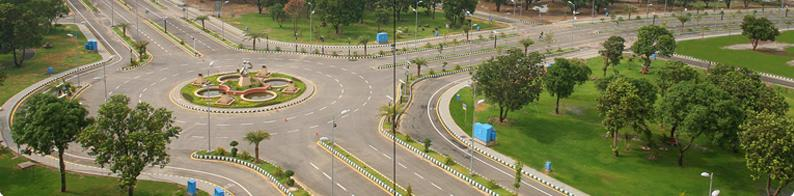
- Interactive map of Sukh Chayn Gardens سکھ چین باغ
- Coordinates: 31°29′39″N 74°16′10″E
- Country: Pakistan
- Province: Punjab
- City: Lahore
- Administrative town: Iqbal
- Union council: 122 (Maraka)

Sukh Chayn Gardens (Punjabi, Urdu: سکھ چین باغ) is a private housing project located within union council 122 (Maraka) in Iqbal Town of Lahore, Punjab, Pakistan. In December 2004, a contract was signed between Pakistan and China and the foundation stone was laid. Sukh Chayn Gardens has a total area of 107.8 hectares , out of which kanals are residential, 63.8 hectares commercial, 2.3 hectares for public use and 7.9 hectares for open spaces.

== Subdivisions ==
Sukh Chayn Garden has residential sectors, called A through H, with each sector consisting of a central park and a commercial area.
