= Pakistan Monument =

National monument in Islamabad, Pakistan

- یادگارِ پاکستان
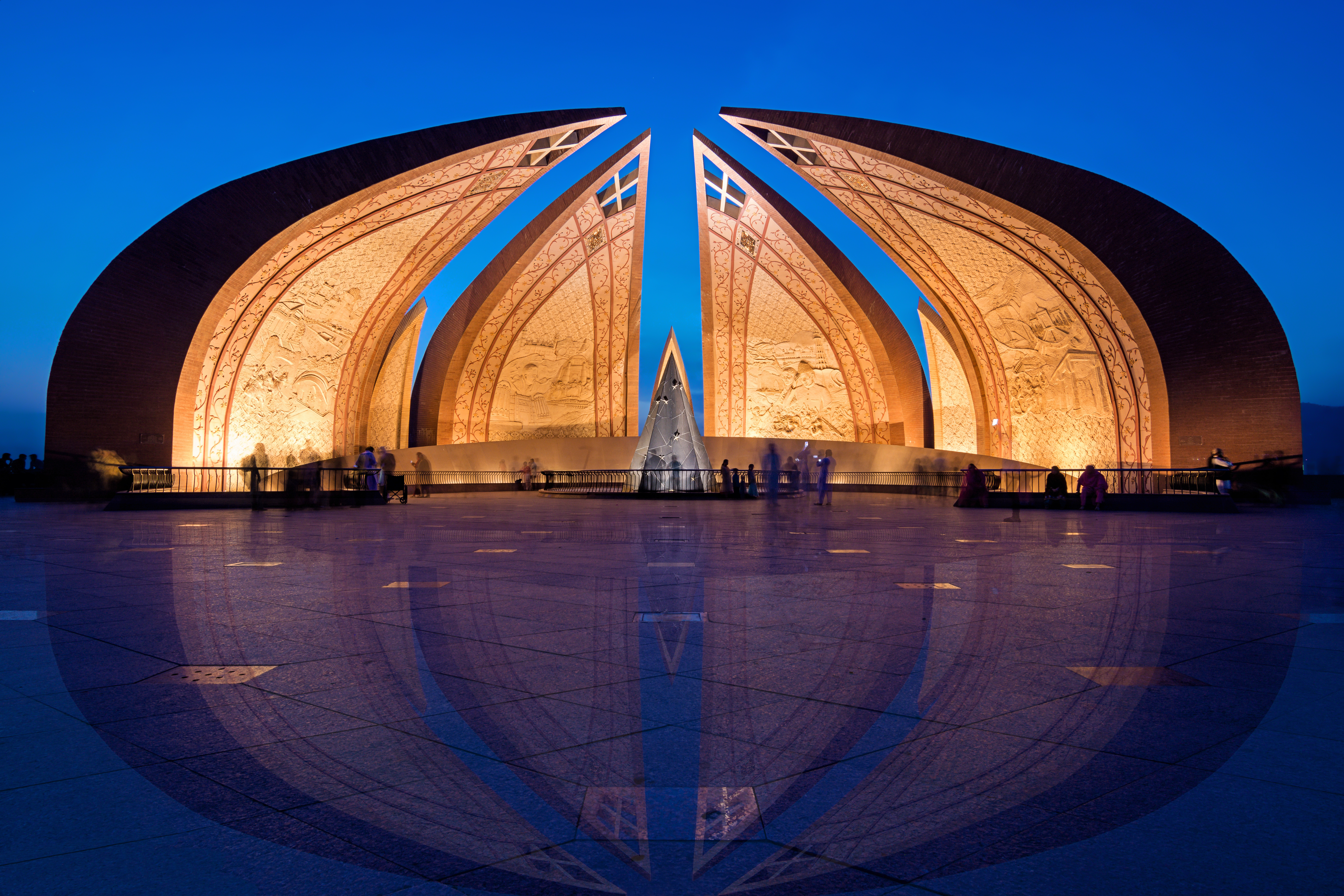
- Pakistan Monument at night
- Interactive map of Pakistan Monument
- Location: Shakarparian Hills, Islamabad, Pakistan
- Coordinates: 33°41′36″N 73°04′06″E
- Designer: Arif Masoud (architect); Guchrung (artwork)
- Type: National monument
- Material: Granite, stainless steel (crescent), black granite (star)
- Height: 18 m
- Visitors: 0.57 million (in 2015)
- Beginning date: 25 May 2004
- Completion date: 2006
- Opening date: 23 March 2007
- Dedicated to: Unity of the Pakistani people
- Owner: Ministry of Culture

The Pakistan Monument (Urdu: یادگارِ پاکستان, romanized: Yādgār-e-Pākistān) is a national monument and heritage museum located on the western portion of the Shakarparian Hills in Islamabad, Pakistan. The monument was constructed to symbolize the unity of the Pakistani people; and is dedicated to those who sacrificed their "today" for a better "tomorrow".

The four large petals represent the four major cultures of Pakistan – Punjabi, Baloch, Sindhi, Pashtun – with the three smaller petals representing the minor cultures, including Azad Kashmir and Gilgit-Baltistan. All seven petals converge in unison over the central platform. Its elevation makes the monument visible from across the Islamabad-Rawalpindi metropolitan area and it is a popular tourist destination.

== Conception ==
The plan for a National Monument in Islamabad was first envisioned in 2002 by the government of Pakistan then assisted by Uxi Mufti, son of Mumtaz Mufti. The Ministry of Culture was tasked to organize through the Pakistan Council of Architects and Town Planners; a national monument design competition based on the theme of signifying strength, unity and dedication of the people of Pakistan into an icon representing an independent and free nation. From a total of 21 submissions, 3 were short-listed. The final design proposed by Arif Masoud was selected and approved on 10 July 2003. The foundation stone was laid on 25 May 2004, completed in 2006 and inaugurated on 23 March 2007 by President General Pervez Musharraf.

== Design concept ==
Covering a total area of 2.8 hectares (6.9 acres), the design of the monument is rooted in the rich Mughal architecture of the Subcontinent. Its petal-shaped structure is derived from the traditional muqarnas of Mughal architecture. As the architect says: "We should learn from history but not remain in it." He used today's technology to modernize the historical form of the muqarnas. The resultant petal-shaped structure emphasizes the importance of unity and togetherness among the people of Pakistan. Rather than symbolizing the four provinces (as is mistakenly observed), it represents the four different cultures of the people of Pakistan. The four large petals represent each of the four cultures, the Punjabi, the Baloch, the Sindhi and the Pakhtun. The three smaller petals represent: the minorities, Azad Kashmir and Gilgit-Baltistan. All seven petals, though independent of each other, stand together in unison to form the nation of Pakistan. Standing together, they are protecting the star and the crescent of the flag of Pakistan.

The star of the flag in the monument is designed in shiny black granite with golden stars, which represent the people who sacrificed their lives for Pakistan. The moon crescent is made from stainless steel with inspirational writings of Quaid-e-Azam Muhammad Ali Jinnah and Allama Iqbal. The petals are built of granite (projecting in a suspended cantilever form, among the largest in Asia) and its inner walls are covered with artwork depicting various landmarks of Pakistan, notable people of Pakistan's independence movement and musical and dance themes. The landmarks portrayed include Lahore Fort, Badshahi Mosque, Khyber Pass, and Minar-e-Pakistan.

Other than the People's Monument, there is a museum that narrates the history and story of the creation of Pakistan. These two structures are connected by a large piazza, known as the Freedom Plaza. Though the name of the architect – Arif Masoud – is inscribed in stone on the main dedication plaque located outside the main plaza, he has honoured all construction workers by placing their hand impressions all along the long walls flanking this Freedom Plaza on both sides. At the farthest end is a viewing platform which gives a bird's-eye view of Islamabad. From the air, the monument looks like a star (centre) and a crescent moon (formed by walls forming the petals), these represent the star and crescent on Pakistan's flag.

== Museum ==
Adjoining the monument is the Pakistan Monument Museum, which includes a wax museum depicting important events leading to the Pakistan Movement. Furthermore, the facilities includes a reference library, audio-visual archive, conference hall along with a 62-seat capacity auditorium known as Panorama Hall. The complex received on average around 1,500 tourists per day totaling at 0.57 million visitors in 2015, while there were 514,944 visits in 2018.

== Gallery ==
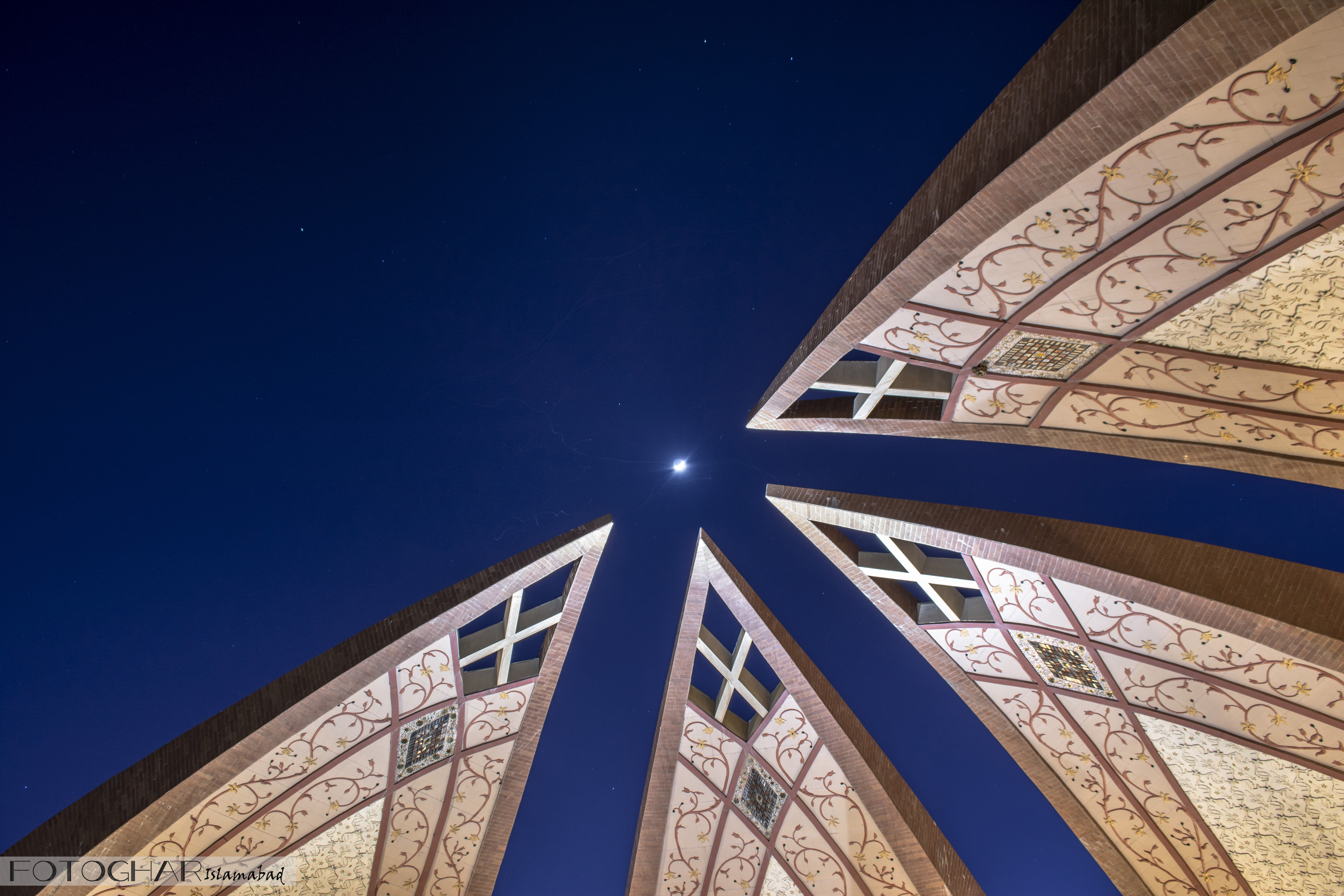
Moon as seen from the Monument

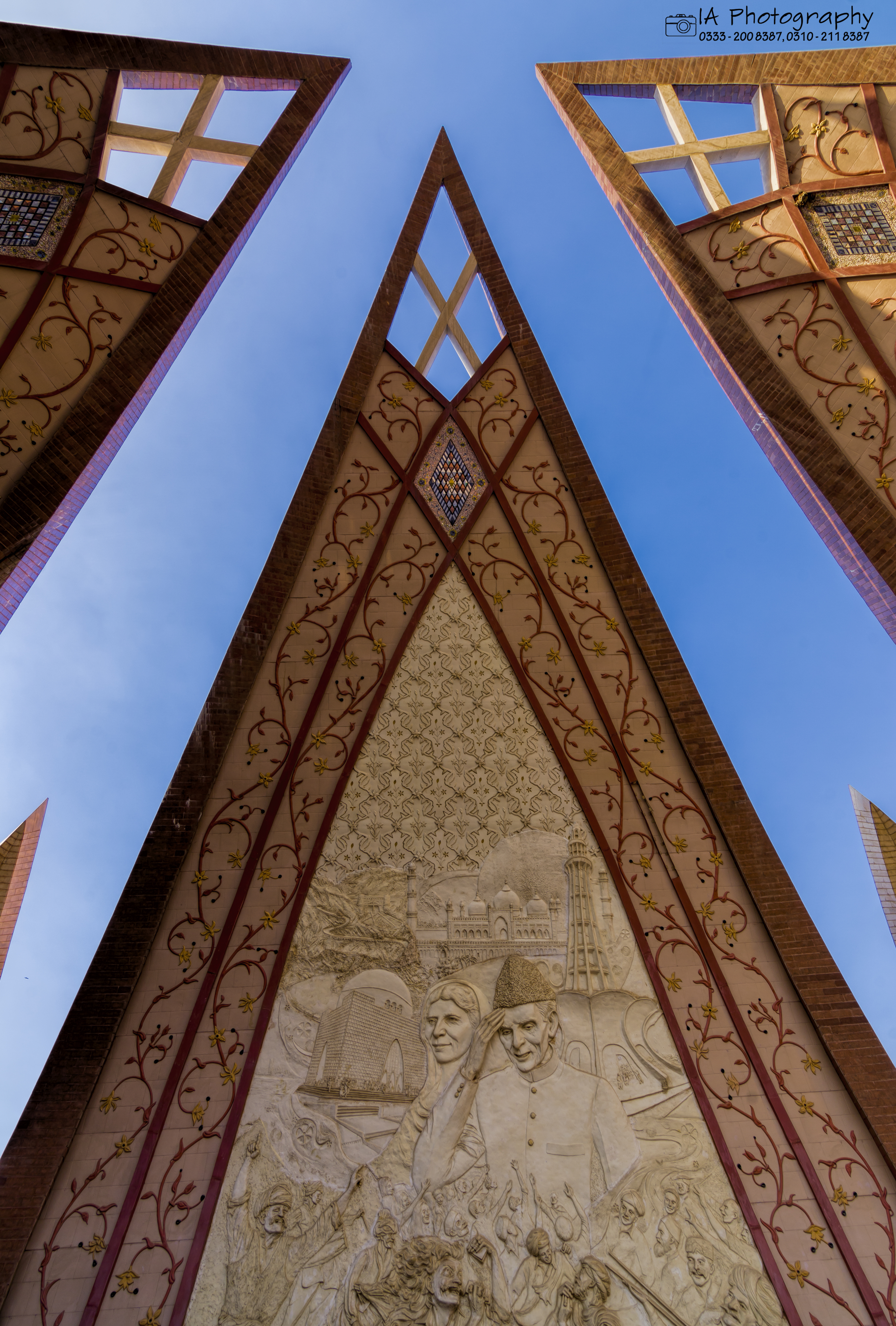
One of the leaves displaying Quaid-e-Azam Jinnah and his sister.

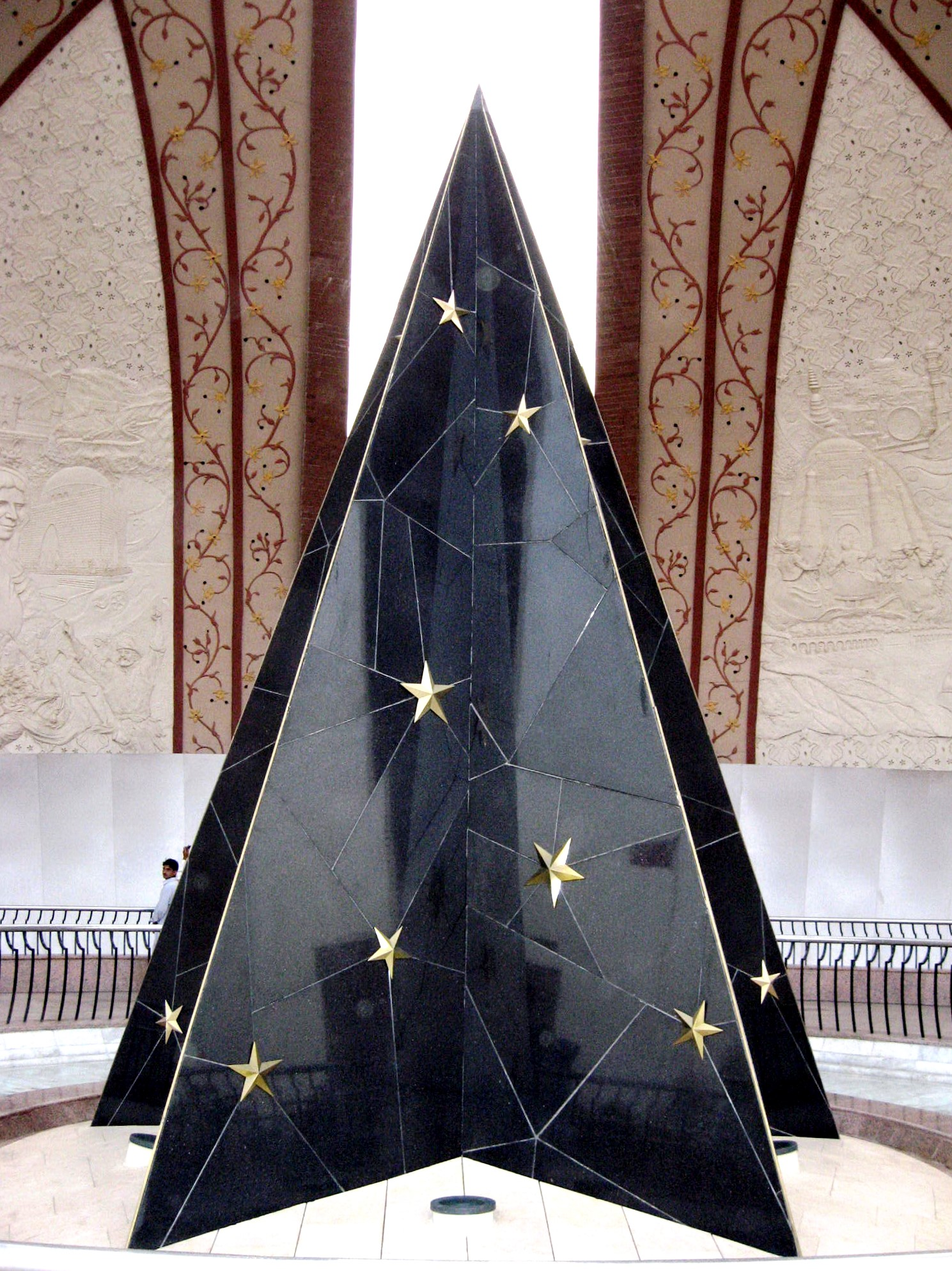
Central platform

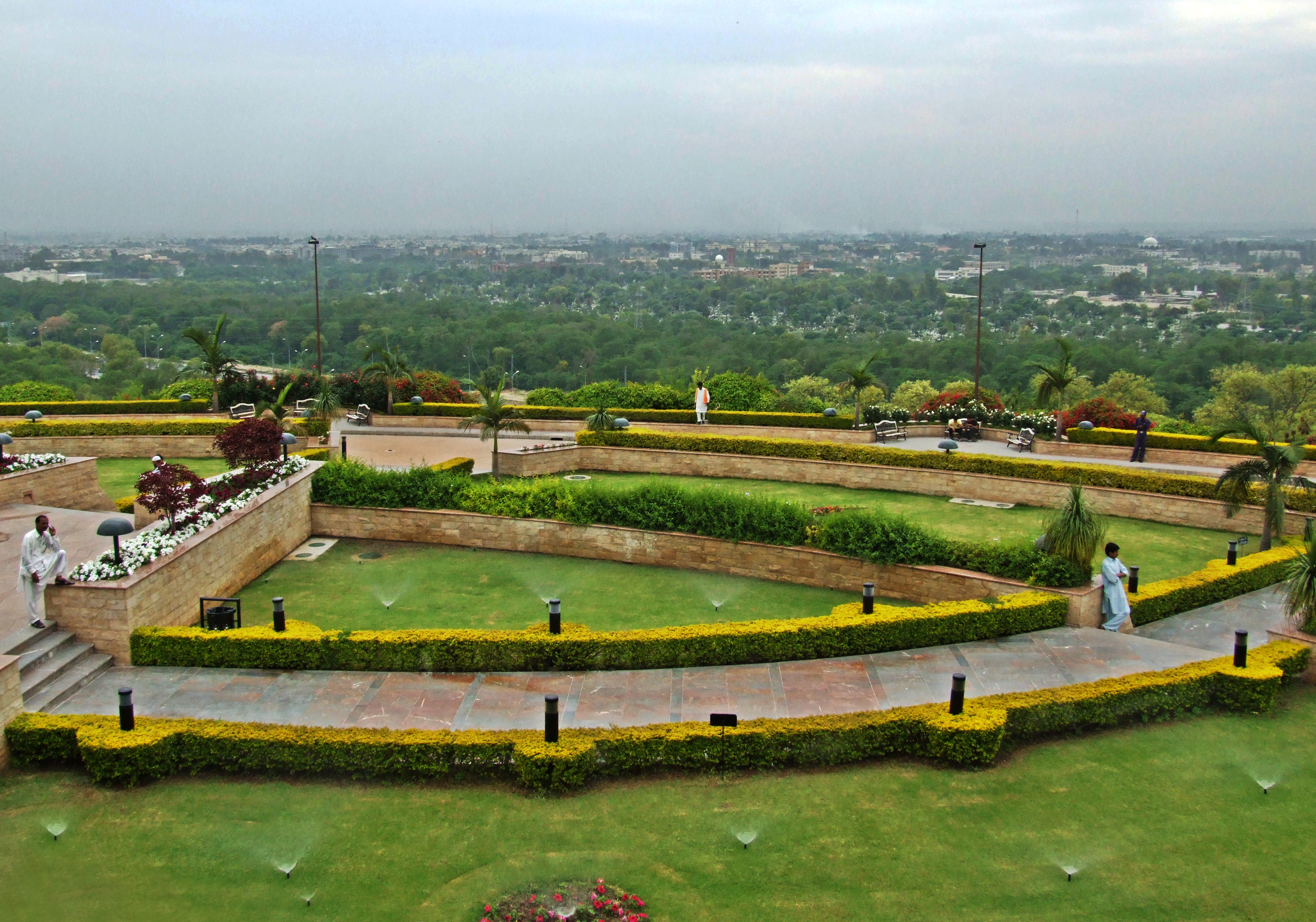
Gardens at the Pakistan Monument

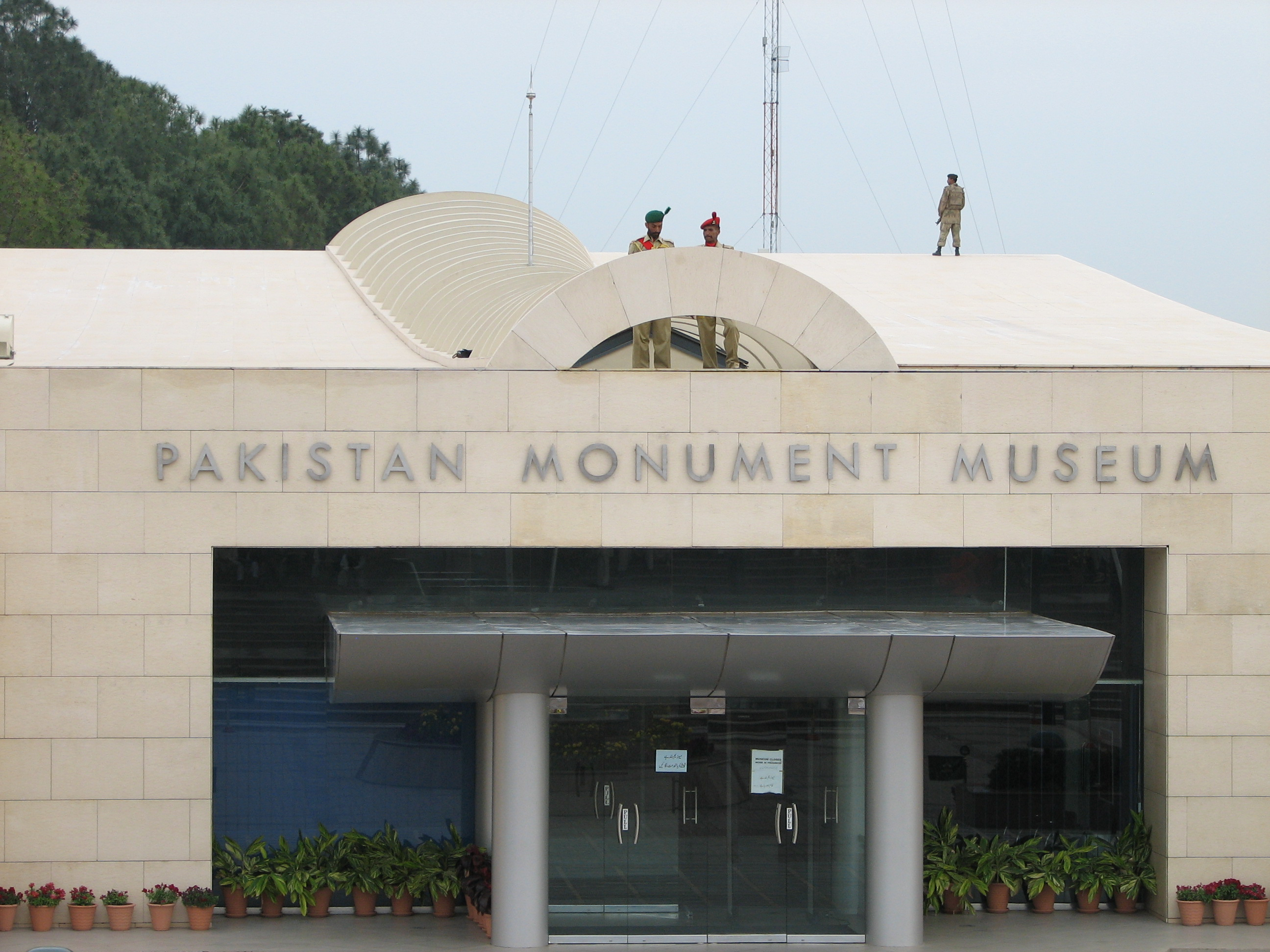
Pakistan Monument Museum

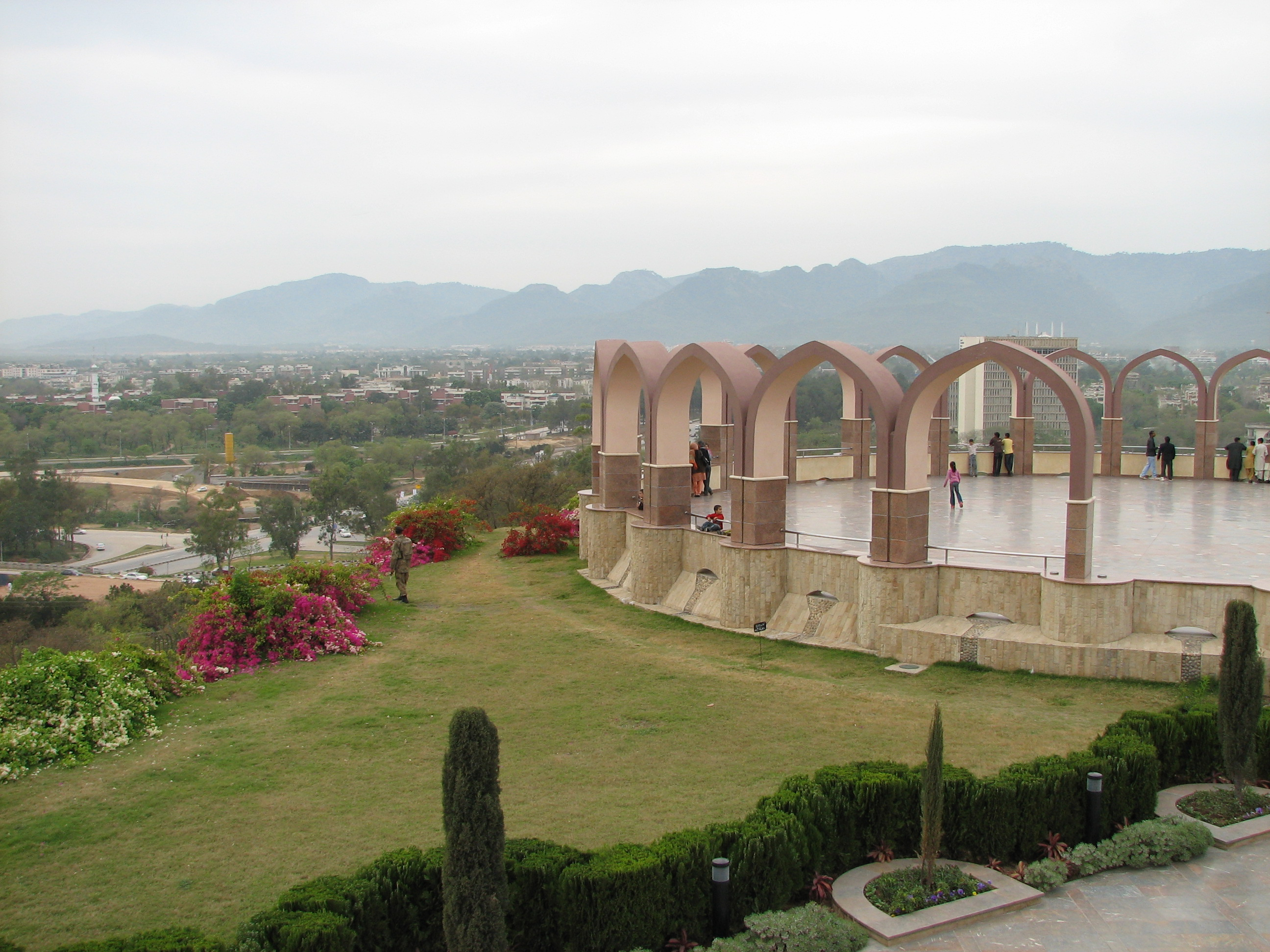
Monument Arches

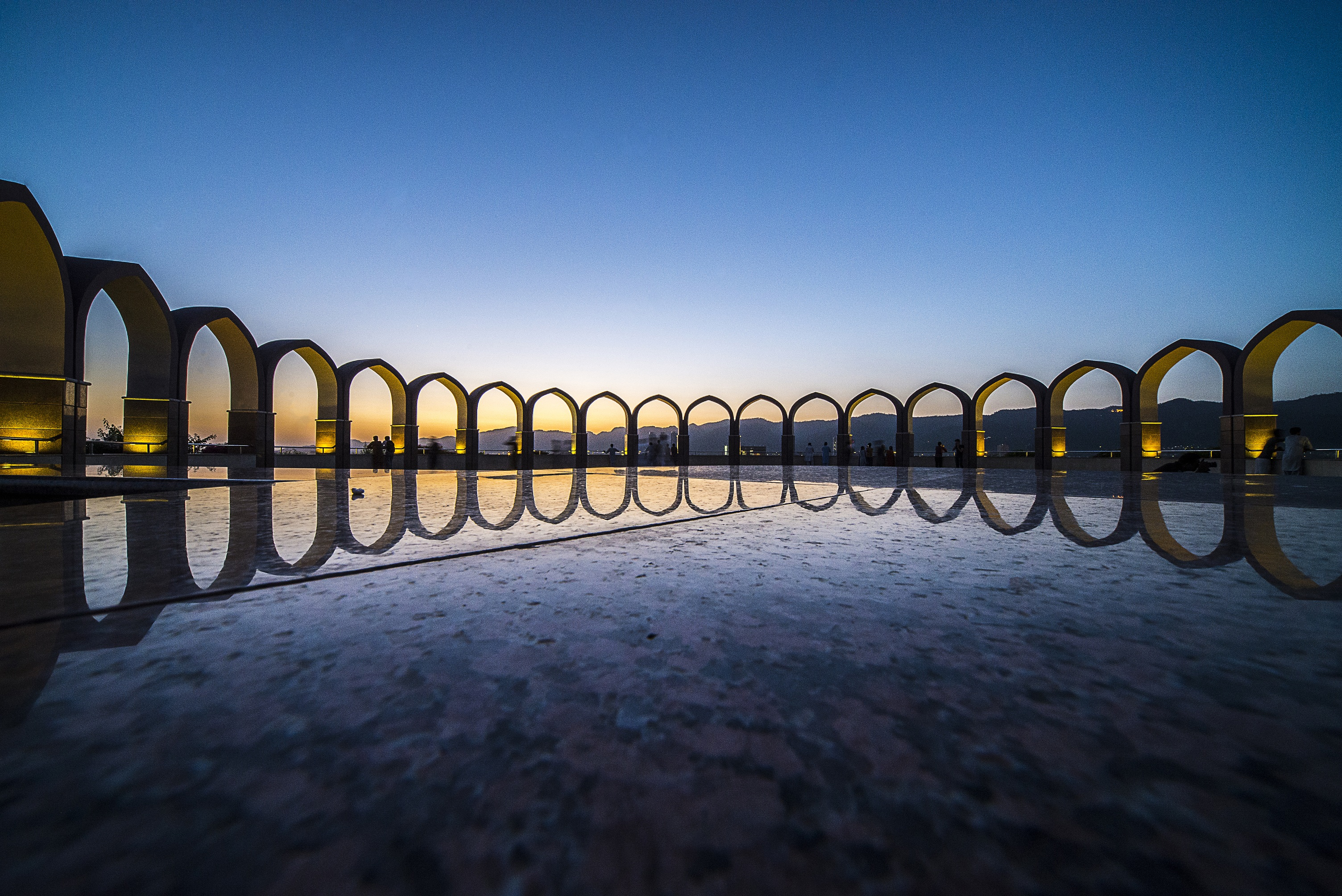
Monument Arches

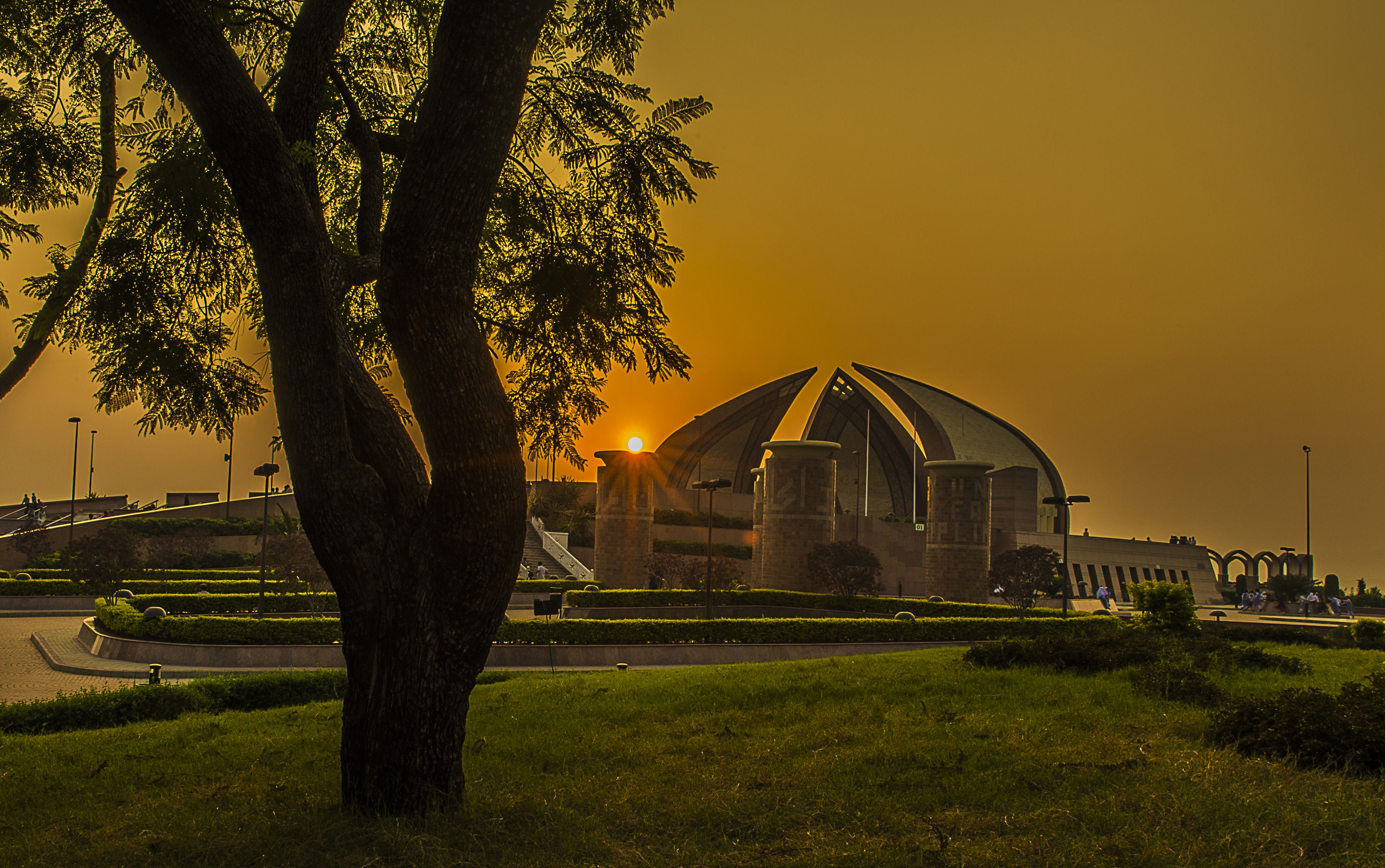
Sunset at Monument

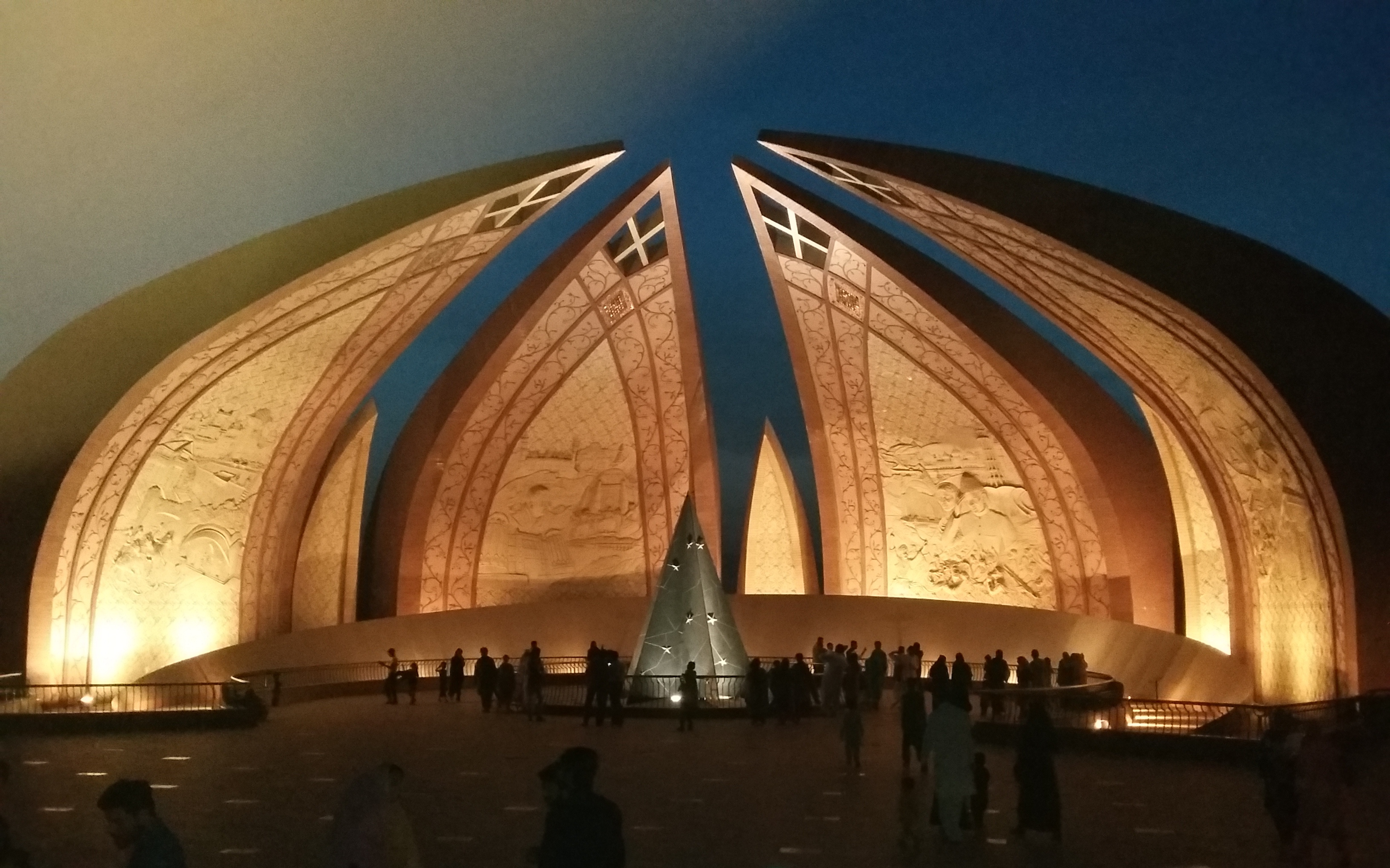
Pakistan Monument Islamabad

== See also ==
- Minar-e-Pakistan
- History of Pakistan
