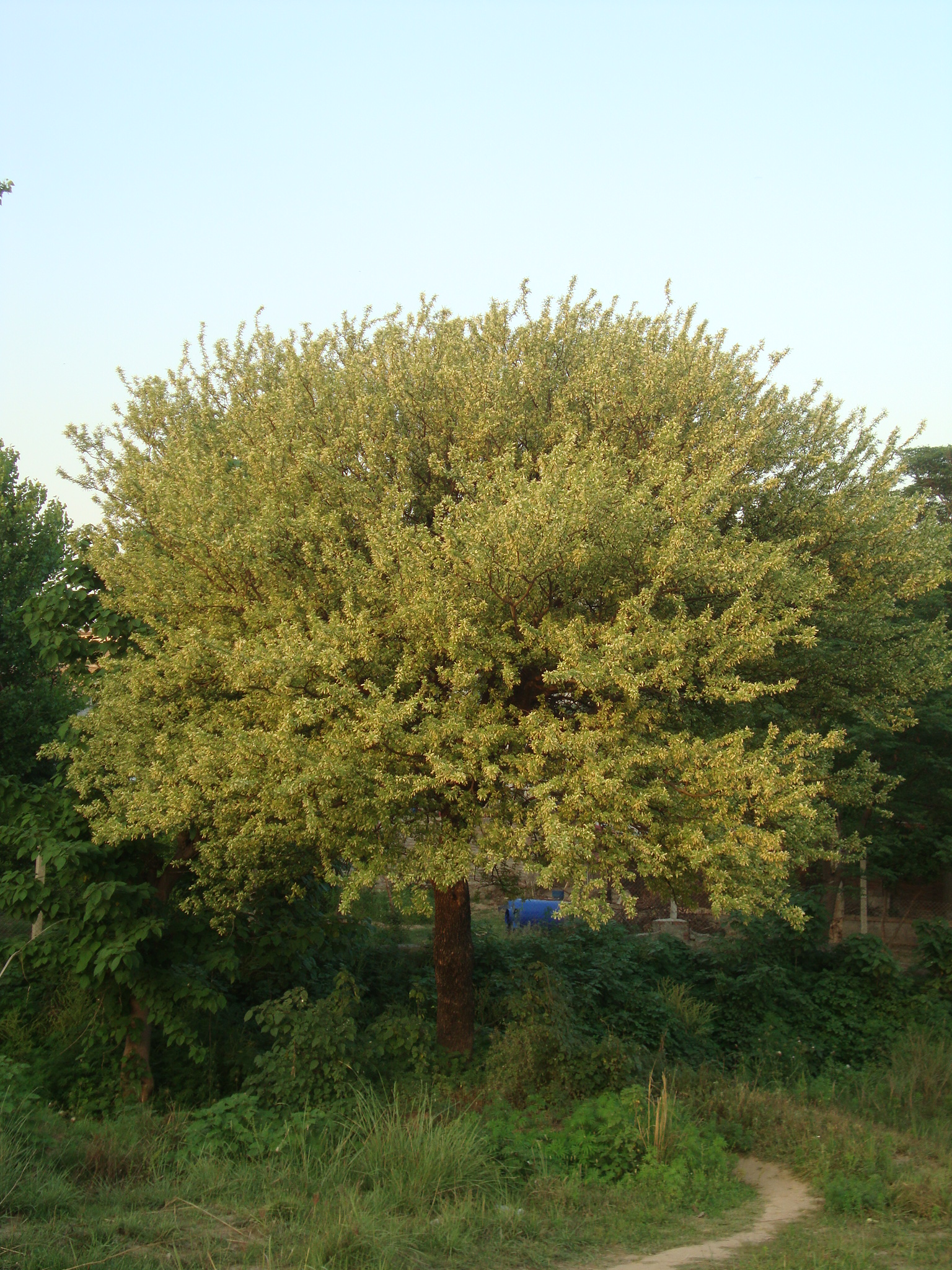

Scientific classification
- Kingdom: Plantae
- Clade: Tracheophytes
- Clade: Angiosperms
- Clade: Eudicots
- Clade: Rosids
- Order: Fabales
- Family: Fabaceae
- Subfamily: Caesalpinioideae
- Clade: Mimosoid clade
- Genus: Senegalia
- Species: S. modesta

Binomial name
- Senegalia modesta (Wall.) P. J. H. Hurter

Synonyms
- Acacia modesta Wall.; Mimosa dumosa Roxb.; Mimosa obovata Roxb.

= Senegalia modesta =

Species of legume

Senegalia modesta (commonly called phulai in Pakistan, phalāhī ਫਲਾਹੀ پھلاہی (Punjabi) in India) is a species of plant commonly found in Pakistan, India and Afghanistan. S. modesta is a perennial tree and formerly, it was classified as Acacia modesta. The plant is drought tolerant. S. modesta`s tree grow in medium size (3 to almost 5 meters) deciduous form with rough surfaced, brown or greenish grey bark, leaflets as (3-5 pairs), cream colored inflorescence (in April–May or July–August) in the form of pedunculate spike, pods as stipitate having 3-5 seeds inside.

In August, 2018 thousands of phulai trees were planted during the two-day tree plantation for reforestation campaign in Kingyar Gali, District Buner, Khyber Pakhtunkhwa Pakistan.

The tree produces a gum in the form of pale yellow small tears of mucilage. This gum (also called gum arabic) is used for emulsification and stabilizing agent in food, cosmetic, textile and pharmaceutical industries. The hard wood of tree is also source of fuel.

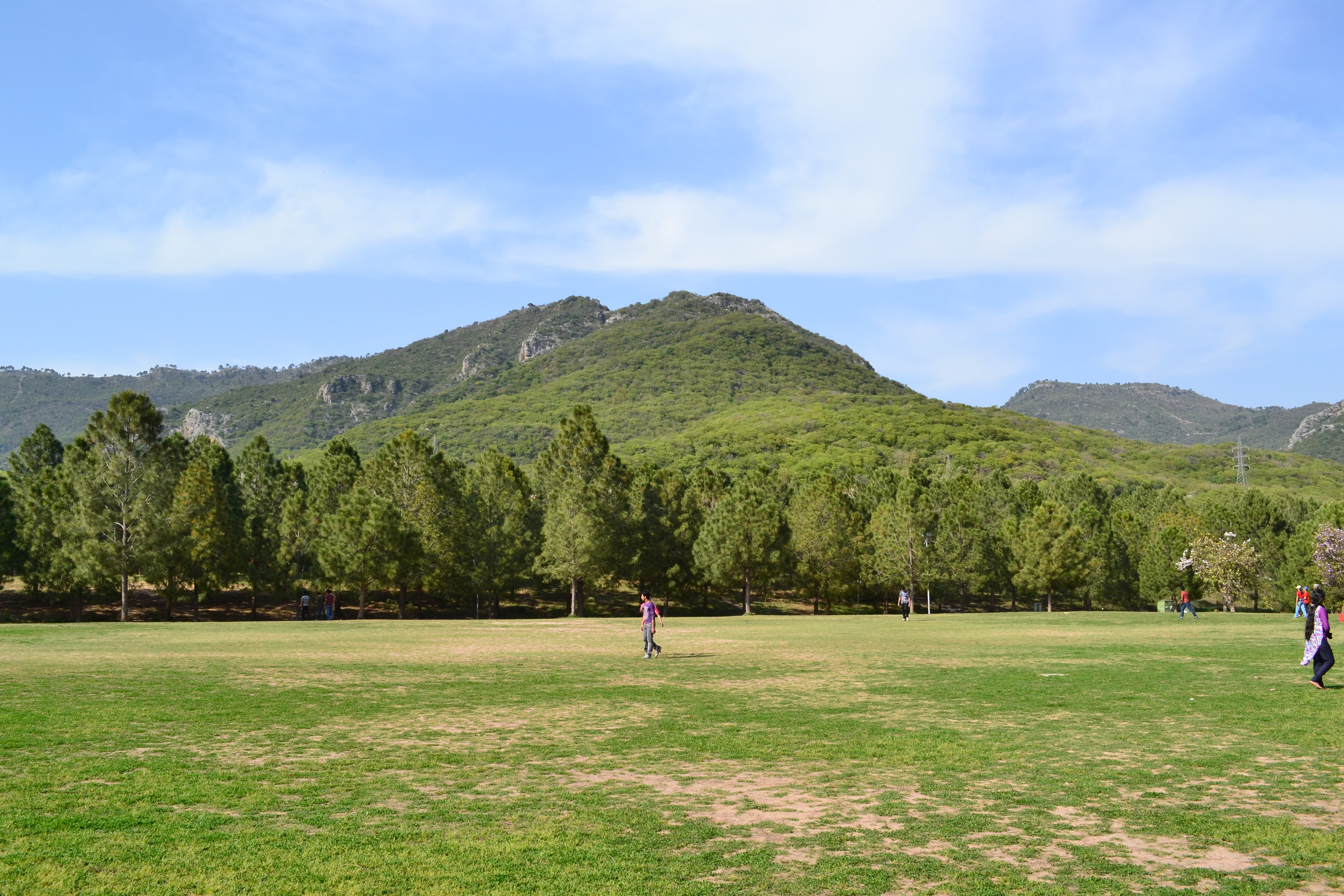
Senegalia modesta on Nekka Phullai Hill of Margalla Range Islamabad Pakistan

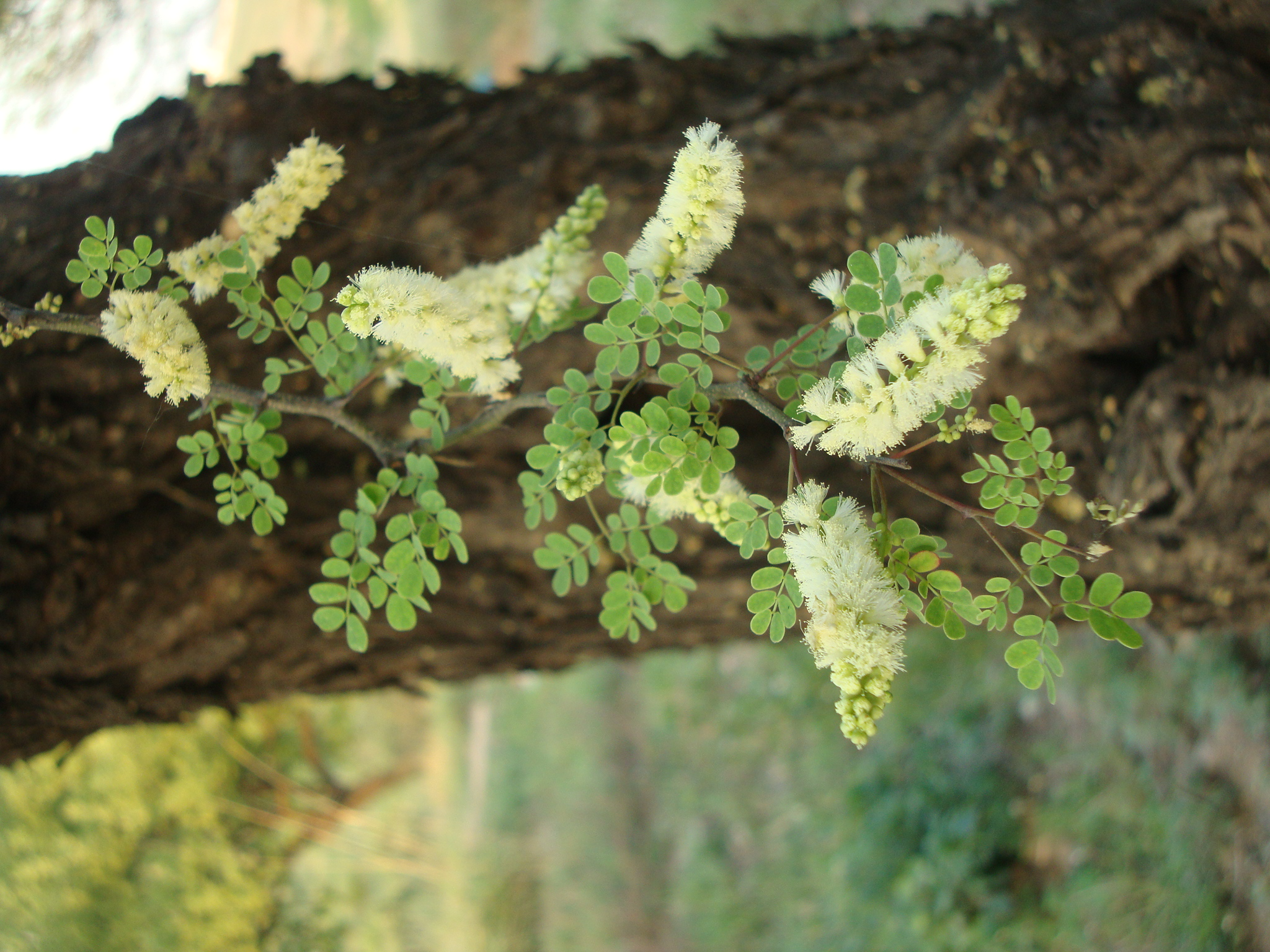
Flowers and leaves of S. modesta
