= Shakarparian =

National park in Islamabad, Pakistan

Coordinates: 33°41′N 73°05′E

- کوہ مارگلہ شکر
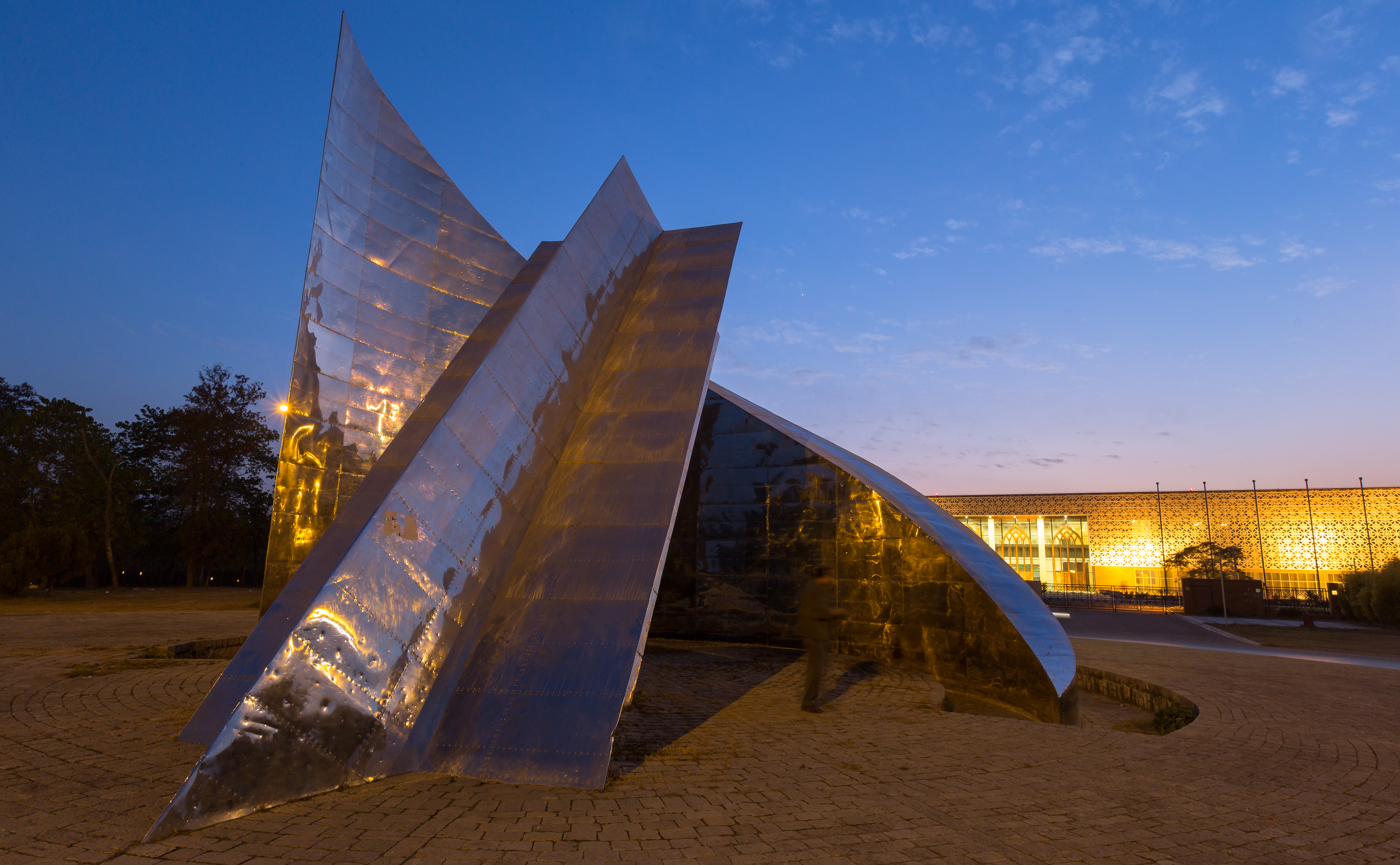
- Star and Crescent Monument near the start of Shakarparian
- Interactive map of Shakarparian
- Type: Public
- Location: Islamabad, Pakistan

Shakarparian (Urdu: کوہ مارگلہ شکر; also known as Shakarparian Hills) is a hill and a national park located near the Zero Point Interchange in Islamabad, Pakistan. Pakistan Monument and Pakistan Monument Museum are also located in Shakarparian.

Members of the Gakhar tribe settled here before the Indo-Pak partition in 1947; later, the clan was relocated to create a park for the newly marked federal capital of the country in 1960–61.

Shakarparian also has a parade ground that hosts the Pakistan Day Parade every year on 23 March.

The Capital Development Authority (CDA) manages ongoing plantation drives in Shakarparian, to plant indigenous species like pine and replace allergy causing paper mulberry trees.

== See also ==
- List of parks and gardens in Pakistan
