= Ayub National Park =

National park in Pakistan

Ayub National Park پارک قومی ایوب
- Topi Rakh Park
- IUCN category II (national park)
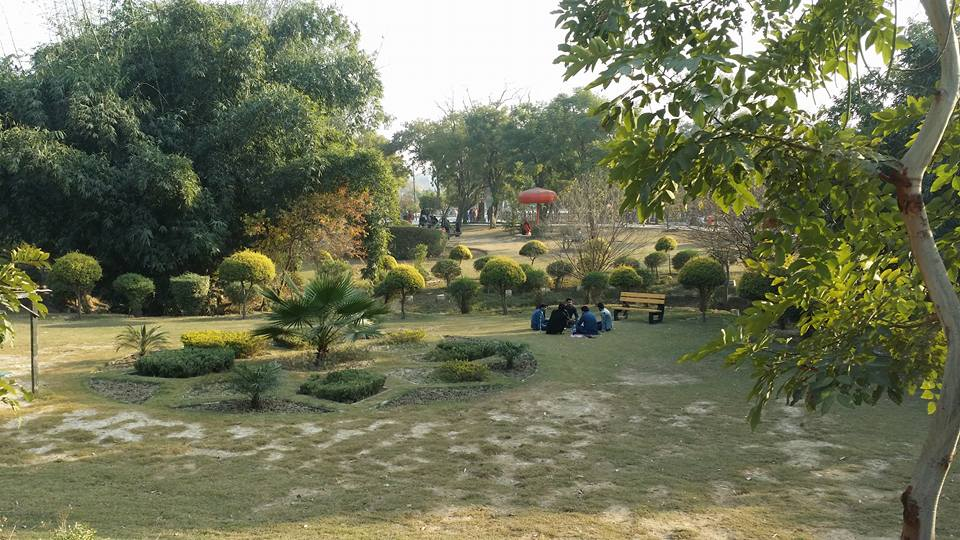
- Interactive map of Ayub National Park پارک قومی ایوب
- Location: Grand Trunk Road, Rawalpindi, Punjab, Pakistan
- Nearest city: Rawalpindi
- Coordinates: 33°34′15″N 73°04′50″E
- Area: 127 hectares
- Elevation: 505 m (1,657 ft)
- Governing body: Army Heritage Foundation
- Website: ayubpark.com

Ayub National Park, commonly known as Ayub Park or, historically, Topi Rakh Park (Rakh lit. reserve in Potwari), is a national park located on the Grand Trunk Road, not far away from the old presidency in Rawalpindi, Punjab, Pakistan.

The park was established before the creation of Pakistan and covers an area of 127 hectares (313 acres). It was named after the former President of Pakistan Field Marshal Ayub Khan. It is the largest park in the Islamabad–Rawalpindi metropolitan area, and is claimed to be one of the largest in Asia.

== History ==
The park was established during the British Raj as the Topi Rakh Park as a popular picnic spot. In 1959, it was converted into a national park during the reign of Ayub Khan, with Rawalpindi Cantonment Board tasked with its administration. The park's open air theater, the only one in the then-capital Rawalpindi, used to host top cultural and social gatherings. However, the park was neglected over the years, almost falling into disuse in the early 1990s.

In 2001, President Pervez Musharraf handed over its control to the Army Heritage Foundation, which oversaw extensive development work there, establishing play areas, jogging tracks, and lawns.

On 16 November 2021, a "Miracle Garden" was inaugurated at the park, along with a waste recycling plant and chairlift.

== Features ==
=== Cricket ground ===
The south side of the park, once covered with mud and wild growth, was developed into a cricket facility in 2014. A flood-lit cricket ground and practice nets were established. The ground soon became a hub for night tournaments in Ramadan, with a dozen clubs and thousands of players availing it every night.

The ground also hosted the PCB U16 National One-Day Tournament in 2021.

=== Hockey ground ===
An AstroTurf hockey ground was inaugurated by Chief of Army Staff Qamar Javed Bajwa at the park on 21 January 2022. The ground was developed by Army Heritage Foundation and Mari Petroleum.

=== Jungle Barracks ===
Former barracks present in the park have been converted to resorts which can be rented for overnight stays.

=== Jungle World ===
The Jungle World theme park contains an animal-themed amusement park and a zoo.

In September 2020, 44 animals were shifted from Islamabad Zoo to the Jungle World after the zoo was shut down due to lack of adequate facilities. They included three wolves, four black bulls, four blue bulls, four urials, five rabbits, seven monkeys, and seventeen rabbits.

As of 2022, the zoo houses 130 species of animals and more than 200 birds.

== See also ==
- List of national parks of Pakistan
