= List of cultural heritage sites in Islamabad =

Islamabad Capital Territory is located on the Pothohar Plateau where excavations have revealed evidence of a prehistoric culture. Relics and human skulls have been found dating back to 5000 BC that show this region was home to Neolithic people who settled on the banks of the Soan River, and developed small communities in the region at around 3000 BC. Islamabad's cultural heritage includes various archaeological sites, government buildings, shrines, stupas, landmarks, and national monuments.

According to one survey by Quaid-i-Azam University in 2010, there are around 450 heritage sites in the capital territory and the adjoining Rawalpindi District. The Capital Development Authority formed a committee in 2011 to locate and preserve 150 of these historical and archaeological sites.

Following is an incomplete list of the cultural heritage sites in Islamabad Capital Territory.

National monuments

ID	Name	Type	Location	District	Coordinates	Image
ICT-1	Mausoleum of Meher Ali Shah	Shrine	In Golra Sharif, Sector E-11	Islamabad	33°41′29″N 72°58′27″E	Mausoleum of Meher Ali Shah More images Upload Photo
ICT-2	Golra Sharif Railway Museum and Station	Museum and historical site	Located on Golra Road	Islamabad Capital Territory	33°40′15″N 72°56′51″E	Golra Sharif Railway Museum and Station More images Upload Photo
ICT-3	Saidpur Village	Historical site	On Khayaban-e-Iqbal, opposite Sector F-6, parallel to Islamabad Zoo	Islamabad Capital Territory	33°44′34″N 73°04′04″E	Saidpur Village More images Upload Photo
ICT-4	Pakistan Monument	Landmark	Located on Shakarparian near Zero Point Interchange	Islamabad	33°41′36″N 73°04′06″E	Pakistan Monument More images Upload Photo
ICT-5	Faisal Mosque	Mosque	Located at end of Shahrah-e-Faisal at the foot of Margalla Hills	Islamabad Capital Territory	33°43′47″N 73°02′15″E	Faisal Mosque More images Upload Photo
ICT-6	Bari Imam	Shrine	Nurpur Shahan village - 4 kilometres (2.5 mi) northeast of the Diplomatic Enclave	Islamabad Capital Territory	33°44′43″N 73°06′40″E	Bari Imam More images Upload Photo
ICT-7	Pakistan Museum of Natural History	Museum	Garden Avenue, Shakarparian	Islamabad	33°41′10″N 73°04′35″E	Pakistan Museum of Natural History More images Upload Photo
ICT-8	Parliament House	Official building	on Constitution Avenue	Islamabad city	33°43′55″N 73°05′45″E	Parliament House More images Upload Photo
ICT-9	Supreme Court of Pakistan	Official building	on Constitution Avenue	Islamabad city	33°43′39″N 73°05′54″E	Supreme Court of Pakistan More images Upload Photo
ICT-10	Aiwan-e-Sadr	Official building	on Constitution Avenue	Islamabad	33°43′53″N 73°05′51″E	Aiwan-e-Sadr More images Upload Photo
ICT-11	Prime Minister's Secretariat	Official building	on Constitution Avenue	Islamabad	33°43′33″N 73°06′00″E	Prime Minister's Secretariat More images Upload Photo
ICT-12	Pak Secretariat buildings	Official building	on Constitution Avenue	Islamabad	33°44′07″N 73°05′34″E	Pak Secretariat buildings More images Upload Photo
ICT-13	National Archives of Pakistan	Official building	on Constitution Avenue	Islamabad	33°44′24″N 73°05′41″E	Upload Photo Upload Photo
ICT-14	National Library of Pakistan	Official building	Behind Prime Minister's Secretariat	Islamabad	33°43′34″N 73°06′07″E	National Library of Pakistan More images Upload Photo
ICT-15	Jinnah Convention Centre	Building	On Murree Road near Kashmir Chowk	Islamabad	33°42′45″N 73°06′17″E	Jinnah Convention Centre More images Upload Photo
ICT-16	Punjab House	Official building	Sector F-5	Islamabad	33°44′34″N 73°05′25″E	Punjab House More images Upload Photo
ICT-17	Sindh House	Official building	Sector F-5	Islamabad	33°44′20″N 73°05′16″E	Sindh House More images Upload Photo
ICT-18	Kashmir House	Official building	Sector F-5	Islamabad	33°44′13″N 73°05′01″E	Upload Photo Upload Photo
ICT-19	Balochistan House	Official building	Sector F-5	Islamabad	33°44′06″N 73°05′23″E	Balochistan House More images Upload Photo
ICT-20	Khyber Pakhtunkhwa House	Official building	Sector F-5	Islamabad	33°44′05″N 73°05′13″E	Upload Photo Upload Photo
ICT-21	Buddhist and Hindu sites at Shah Allah Ditta village	Archaeological site	various sites in Shah Allah Ditta village	Islamabad Capital Territory		Buddhist and Hindu sites at Shah Allah Ditta village More images Upload Photo
ICT-22	Shah Allah Ditta caves	Archaeological site	Near the shrine of Shah Allah Ditta	Islamabad Capital Territory		Shah Allah Ditta caves More images Upload Photo
ICT-23	Sadhu ka Bagh	Archaeological site	In Shah Allah Ditta village near the caves	Islamabad Capital Territory		Sadhu ka Bagh More images Upload Photo
ICT-24	Jira rock shelters	Archaeological site	near the village of Bobri	Islamabad Capital Territory		Jira rock shelters More images Upload Photo
ICT-25	Bobri rock shelters	Archaeological site	South of the village of Bobri	Islamabad Capital Territory		Upload Photo Upload Photo
ICT-26	Phulgran rock shelter and natural menhirs	Archaeological site	In Phulgran village	Islamabad Capital Territory		Upload Photo Upload Photo
ICT-27	Darwala rock shelters and natural menhirs	Archaeological site	In Darwala village	Islamabad Capital Territory		Upload Photo Upload Photo
ICT-28	Bora Bangial rock shelters and natural menhirs	Archaeological site	In Bora Bangial village	Islamabad Capital Territory		Upload Photo Upload Photo
ICT-29	Peja rock shelters and natural menhirs	Archaeological site	In Peja village	Islamabad Capital Territory		Upload Photo Upload Photo
ICT-30	Gora Mast rock shelters and natural menhirs	Archaeological site	In Gora Mast village	Islamabad Capital Territory		Upload Photo Upload Photo
ICT-31	Bhimbar Tarar rock shelters and natural menhirs	Archaeological site	In Bhimbar Tarar village	Islamabad Capital Territory		Upload Photo Upload Photo
ICT-32	Bagh Jogian caves	Archaeological site	In Bagh Jogian village	Islamabad Capital Territory		Upload Photo Upload Photo
ICT-33	Meharabad Buddhist mound and stupas	Archaeological site	Meharabad, Sector G-12	Islamabad Capital Territory		Upload Photo Upload Photo
ICT-34	Chauntra caves	Archaeological site	North of Sector E-11	Islamabad Capital Territory		Chauntra caves More images Upload Photo
ICT-35	Ban Faqiraan stupas	Archaeological site	Ban Faqiraan	Islamabad Capital Territory		Upload Photo Upload Photo
ICT-36	Ban Faqiraan mosque	Mosque	Ban Faqiraan	Islamabad Capital Territory		Upload Photo Upload Photo
ICT-37	Lizard Rock (rock shelter)	Archaeological site	Lizard Rock Park, Sector G-13	Islamabad Capital Territory		Lizard Rock (rock shelter) More images Upload Photo
ICT-38	Islamabad di daat	Landmark	Fatima Jinnah Park, Sector F-9	Islamabad		Islamabad di daat More images Upload Photo
ICT-39	Fatima Jinnah Park baradri	Landmark	Near the Bolan Gate of Fatima Jinnah Park, Sector F-9	Islamabad	33°41′49″N 73°01′03″E	Fatima Jinnah Park baradri More images Upload Photo
ICT-40	Three domes	Landmark	Fatima Jinnah Park, Sector F-9	Islamabad	33°42′16″N 73°01′04″E	Three domes More images Upload Photo
ICT-41	Reflecting ponds (poetry walls)	Landmark	Fatima Jinnah Park, Sector F-9	Islamabad	33°42′21″N 73°01′02″E	Reflecting ponds (poetry walls) More images Upload Photo
ICT-42	Chaghi Monument	Landmark	Faizabad Interchange	Islamabad	33°40′00″N 73°05′10″E	Chaghi Monument More images Upload Photo
ICT-43	Chan Pir Badsah Darbar	Shrine	In Pandorian, Shehzad Town	Islamabad Capital Territory		Chan Pir Badsah Darbar More images Upload Photo
ICT-44	Lok Virsa Museum	Museum	Garden Avenue, Shakarparian	Islamabad	33°41′20″N 73°04′21″E	Lok Virsa Museum More images Upload Photo
ICT-45	Saudi-Pak Tower	Building	Blue Area	Islamabad	33°42′51″N 73°03′47″E	Saudi-Pak Tower More images Upload Photo
ICT-46	Crescent and Star monument	Landmark	on Garden Avenue near Rose and Jasmine Garden	Islamabad	33°41′53″N 73°05′10″E	Crescent and Star monument More images Upload Photo
ICT-47	Sain cup marks	Archaeological site	Sain village	Islamabad Capital Territory		Upload Photo Upload Photo
ICT-48	Gumbat cup marks	Archaeological site	Gumbat village	Islamabad Capital Territory		Upload Photo Upload Photo
ICT-49	G-10 rock shelter, petroglyphs, and cup marks	Archaeological site	Next to Usman Mosque near Buland Market, G-10/1	Islamabad	33°40′24″N 73°00′47″E	G-10 rock shelter, petroglyphs, and cup marks More images Upload Photo
ICT-50	Arazi Sahal cup marks	Archaeological site	Arazi Sahal village	Islamabad Capital Territory		Upload Photo Upload Photo
ICT-51	G-13 petroglyphs	Archaeological site	Sector G-13/4	Islamabad Capital Territory		Upload Photo Upload Photo
