= Syed Ghulam Moinuddin Gilani =

Sufi Scholar from Pakistan

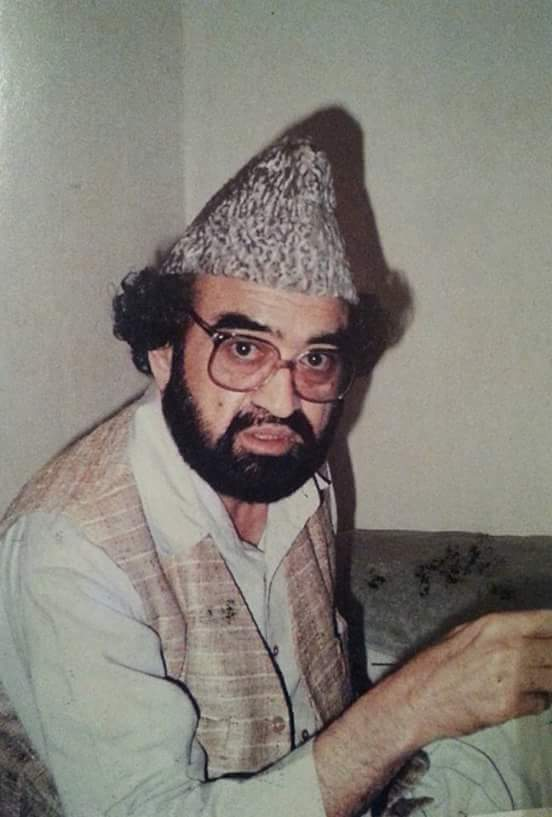
- Title: Pir, Syed

Personal life
- Born: 22 May 1920 (3 Ramadan 1338 A.H.) Golra Sharif, British India (present-day Pakistan)
- Died: 12 March 1997 (aged 77) (2 Ḏū al-Qaʿdah 1417 A.H.) Golra Sharif, Pakistan
- Children: Naseer-uddin-Naseer, Syed Ghulam Jalaluddin Gilani, Syed Ghulam Hussamuddin Gilani
- Parent: Syed Ghulam Mohiyyuddin Gilani
- Other name: Baray Lala jee
- Relations: Meher Ali Shah (grandfather), Syed Shah Abdul Haq Gilani (younger brother)

Religious life
- Religion: Islam
- Order: Sufism Qadiriyya Chishti Order

Muslim leader
- Based in: Golra Sharif
- Predecessor: Syed Ghulam Mohiyyuddin Gilani

Syed Ghulam Moinuddin Gilani, commonly known as Baray Lala jee (22 May 1920 at Golra Sharif, of district Rawalpindi – 12 March 1997), was a Pakistani Islamic scholar and the Sajjada Nashin (successor) of Shrine Golra Sharif in Islamabad.

He was the grandson of Pir Meher Ali Shah, the son of Syed Ghulam Mohiyyuddin Gilani and father of Naseer-uddin-Naseer, all famed scholars. He is also the elder brother of Syed Shah Abdul Haq Gilani. He died on 12 March 1997.

== Early life and education ==
Syed Ghulam Moinuddin Gilani was born on 22 May 1920 in Golra Sharif, Rawalpindi District, into the spiritual lineage of Meher Ali Shah, as the eldest son of Syed Ghulam Mohiyyuddin Gilani.

He received his early religious education at the family madrasa in Golra Sharif. Under the instruction of scholars such as Maulana Ghulam Muhammad Peshawari and Maulana Ghulam Muhammad Ghotavi, he memorized the Qur’an and studied classical Islamic disciplines.

In the late 1930s, he enrolled at Jamia Abbasia Bahawalpur (now Islamia University), where he studied Arabic, jurisprudence, hadith, logic, Persian literature, and mathematics. He earned traditional scholarly titles such as Maulvi, Fazil, and Allama.

== Career ==
After the passing of his father in 1974, Syed Ghulam Moinuddin Gilani assumed the position of Sajjāda Nāshīn (spiritual custodian) of the Golra Sharif shrine. He held this position until his death in 1997.

He provided spiritual guidance, delivered weekly Friday sermons, and presided over the annual Urs celebrations at Golra Sharif, which drew large gatherings of religious scholars, politicians, and devotees.

He also made pilgrimages to sacred cities including Mecca, Medina, Baghdad, Najaf, and Karbala. These travels helped foster spiritual and scholarly ties with international Sufi communities.

== Writings ==
Although not widely published during his lifetime, Syed Ghulam Moinuddin Gilani left behind a modest yet respected body of spiritual and poetic writings.

- Israr-ul-Mushtaq (1998) – A posthumously compiled collection of hamd, na‘at, manqabāt, ghazals, and rubā‘iyyāt in Urdu and Persian, reflecting his deep spiritual devotion and literary style.
- A selection of his sermons and unpublished poems remain preserved in oral tradition, especially recited during the Urs and spiritual gatherings at Golra Sharif.

== See also ==
- Meher Ali Shah
- Naseeruddin Naseer Gilani
- Shrine of Meher Ali Shah
