= Shrine of Meher Ali Shah =

Dargah in Golra Sharif, Pakistan

Shrine of Peer Meher Ali Shah
- پير مہر علی شاہ مزار
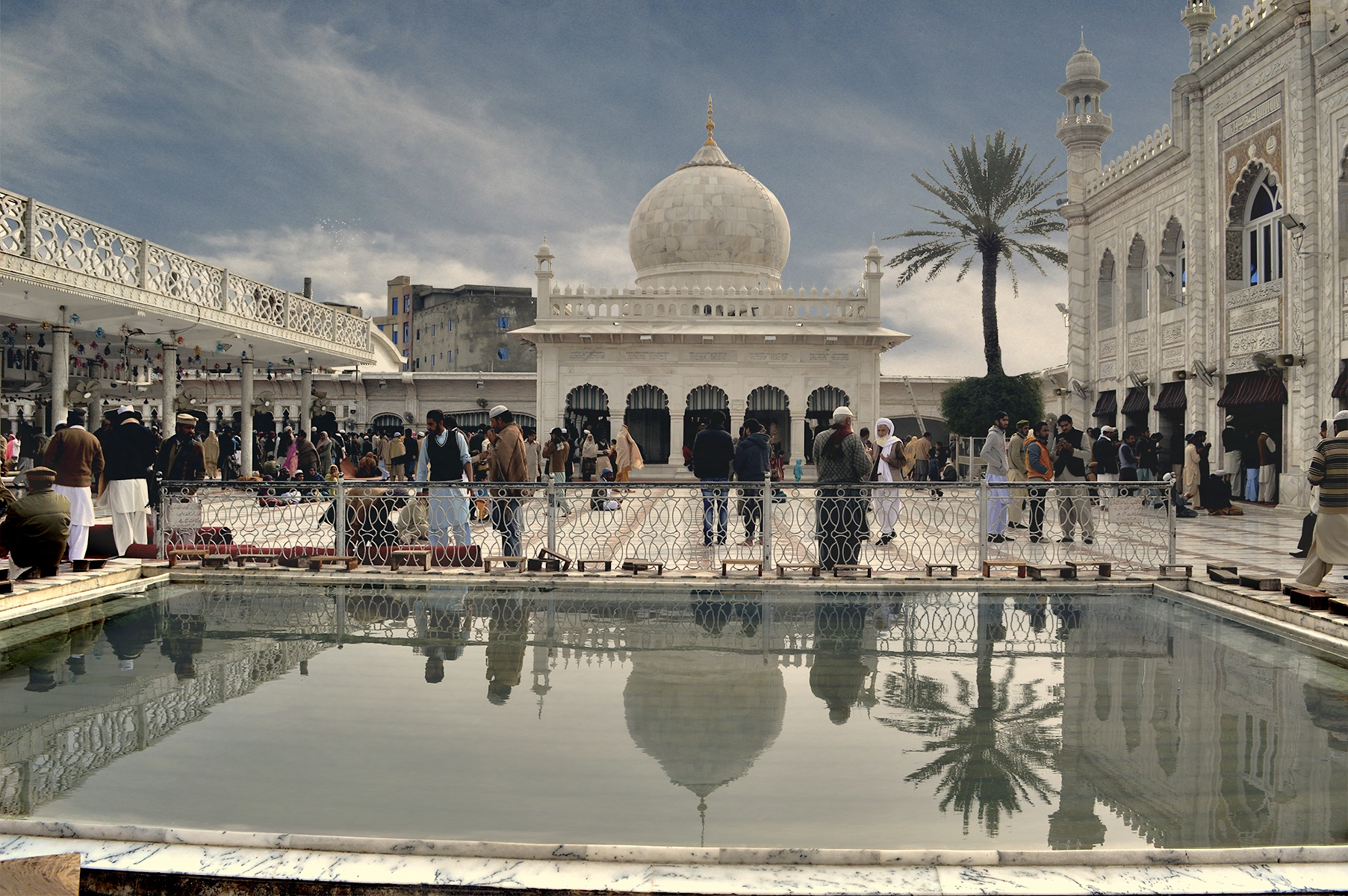

- Location within Punjab, Pakistan

Religion
- Affiliation: Islam

Location
- Location: Golra Sharif, Islamabad Capital Territory
- State: Pakistan
- Interactive map of Shrine of Peer Meher Ali Shah
- Sector: E-11
- Territory: Islamabad Capital Territory
- Coordinates: 33°41′28.95″N 72°58′27.65″E

Architecture
- Architect: Babu Lal-Muhammad Chughtai
- Style: Islamic architecture

The Shrine of Meher Ali Shah is a 20th-century Sufi shrine that serves as the tomb of Pir Meher Ali Shah, an early 20th-century Sufi scholar of the Chishti order, who was also a leader of the anti-Ahmadiyya movement. The shrine is located within the Islamabad Capital Territory, in the village of Golra Sharif.

Today, Golra Sharif is widely known for one of its custodians (Sajjada nashin) Pir Syed Naseer Uddin Naseer Gilani. The shrine's longest-serving Sajjada nashin was Pir Syed Shah Abdul Haq Gilani, the younger son of Babuji, who took care of the shrine for approximately 46 years (from 1974 until his death in July 2020). Presently, the shrine is managed by the heirs of both, Syed Ghulam Moinuddin Gilani and Syed Shah Abdul Haq Gilani.

== Location ==
The mausoleum is situated in the village of Golra Sharif, in the foothills of Margalla in Sector E-11, in the Islamabad Capital Territory. The shrine is situated at an altitude of about 520 m (1,710 ft) above sea level.

== Construction ==
Pir Mehr Ali Shah died on 11 May 1937 and was succeeded by Babuji. The construction of the mausoleum took nearly twenty years to be fully completed. For this purpose, marble was brought from the Makrana mines in Jodhpur State.

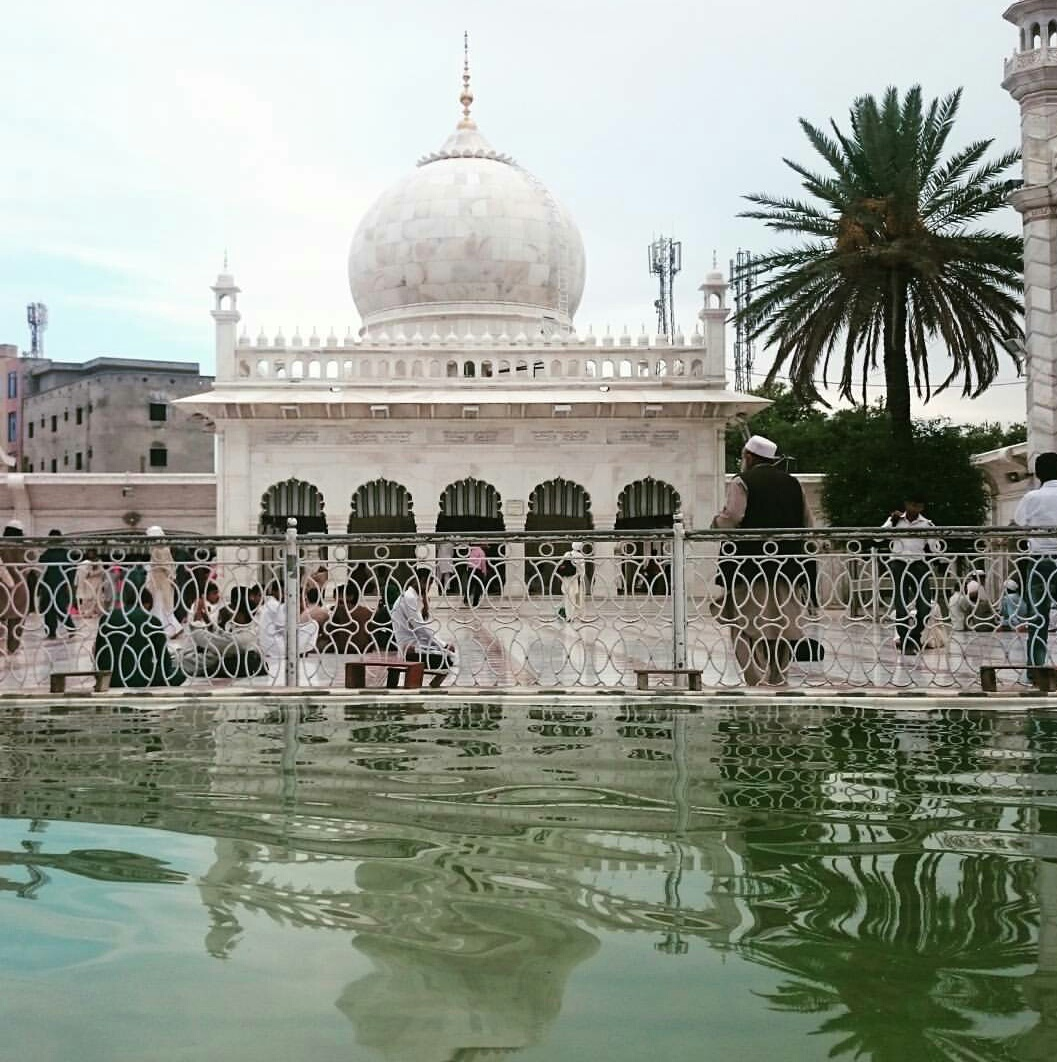
Another view of the shrine and Mausoleum.

== See also ==
- List of cultural heritage sites in Islamabad Capital Territory
- List of cultural heritage sites in Pakistan
- List of mausolea and shrines in Pakistan
- Syed Ghulam Mohiyyuddin Gilani
- Syed Ghulam Moinuddin Gilani
