= Pir Naseeruddin Naseer =

Pakistani Sufi scholar and poet (1949–2009)

Naseeruddin Naseer Gilani
- Title: Pir, Syed

Personal life
- Born: 14 November 1949 Golra Sharif, Islamabad Capital Territory, Pakistan
- Died: 13 February 2009 (aged 59) Golra Sharif, Islamabad Capital Territory, Pakistan
- Parent: Ghulam Moinuddin Gilani
- Main interest: Sufism
- Relatives: Syed Ghulam Moinuddin Gilani (father); Ghulam Mohiyyuddin Gilani (grandfather); Meher Ali Shah (great-grandfather)
- Website: golrasharif.com.pk

Religious life
- Religion: Islam
- Order: Qadiri and Chishti
- School: Hanafi

Muslim leader
- Based in: Golra Sharif
- Predecessor: Ghulam Moinuddin Gilani
- Successor: Syed Ghulam Nizamuddin Jami

Syed Naseeruddin Naseer Gilani (14 November 1949 – 13 February 2009) (Urdu: پیرسید نصیر الدین نصیرگیلانی) was a Pakistani Islamic scholar, poet, and spiritual leader who served as the custodian (Sajjāda Nāshīn) of the Golra Sharif shrine in Islamabad. A descendant of Meher Ali Shah, he was the son of Syed Ghulam Moinuddin Gilani and the nephew of Syed Shah Abdul Haq Gilani.

Renowned as a polyglot and prolific writer, he composed poetry in Arabic, Urdu, Punjabi, and Persian. He authored more than 30 books on Islamic theology, Quranic exegesis, hadith, Islamic jurisprudence, and the life of Muhammad. His Persian Rubā'iyyāt (quatrains) have been included in university curricula in Iran.

He played a prominent role in promoting the values of Islam, love, peace, unity, and humanity across South Asia and internationally. His poetry was famously adapted into Qawwali by Nusrat Fateh Ali Khan, further amplifying his spiritual influence. He could himself play the harmonium, an instrument associated with Qawwali.

== Early life and education ==
Syed Ghulam Naseeruddin Naseer Gilani was born on 14 November 1949 (22 Muharram 1369 AH) in Golra Sharif, near Rawalpindi, into a distinguished spiritual family descended from Meher Ali Shah of Golra Sharif.

He received his initial religious education at the ancestral madrasa in Golra Sharif under the guidance of his father, Syed Ghulam Moinuddin Gillani, and other resident scholars. This early spiritual and academic training took place in a deeply rooted environment of Qadiriyya–Chishti Sufi traditions.

From an early age, Naseer actively studied Quran tajwīd (recitation) and classical Islamic sciences. According to a biographical article:

"Pir Naseeruddin began Tajwīd with Mahbub Ali Lakhanvi and mastered multiple recitation styles... his melodious recitation captivated audiences."

Beyond scripture and jurisprudence, he was educated in Persian and Urdu literature, memorized classical poetry, and became adept in grammar, logic, and theology, all within the family's spiritual institution, rather than formal secular universities.

== Career ==
Pir Naseeruddin became the Sajjāda Nāshīn (custodian) of the Golra Sharif shrine after the passing of his father, Syed Ghulam Moinuddin Gilani. In this capacity, he led religious gatherings, led spiritual rituals, and delivered Khutbahs at the shrine throughout the 1980s and 1990s.

He was widely recognized for his public oratory and poetic recitations, which drew thousands to the shrine. His addresses often combined Islamic teachings with contemporary moral and social commentary, earning him acclaim as "a man of letters, an intellectual, poet of repute and a linguist".

Between the late 1990s and 2000s, Pir Naseeruddin expanded his teaching mission abroad, especially in Europe and North America. He delivered Islamic lectures in Urdu, English, and Persian to the Pakistani diaspora, emphasizing interfaith understanding, peace, and spiritual unity.

His international influence grew thanks to media exposure; recordings of his Qawwali-style poetry were performed by Nusrat Fateh Ali Khan, bringing spiritual audiences to his work across South Asia and beyond.

== Death ==
On 13 February 2009, he felt cardiac pain while preparing for Friday prayer. He suffered a heart attack and was shifted to a hospital, but could not recover and died. His funeral took place in Islamabad and was led by Allama Sajidur Rehman, the custodian of Baghar Sharif shrine. Thousands of devotees from across the country attended the funeral prayers. A large number of people from all walks of life sent condolence messages, including President Asif Ali Zardari and Prime Minister Yusuf Raza Gilani.

== Books ==
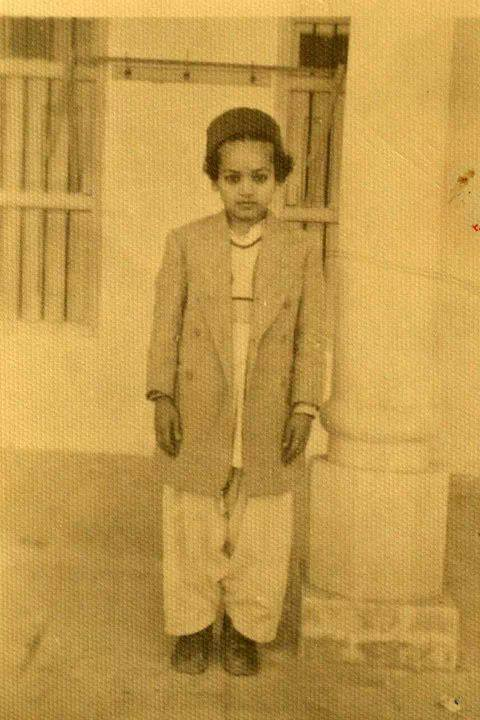
Naseer-uddin-Naseer in childhood

As scholar and author, Pir Naseeruddin published approximately 36–40 books on theology, Quranic exegesis, jurisprudence, and Sufi teachings, in addition to multiple collections of poetry in Urdu, Persian, Arabic, and Punjabi.

His books include:

=== Theology & Islamic Studies (علم و فقہ) ===
- لفظِ اللہ کی تحقیق (Lafz-i-Allah Ki Tahqeeq, late 1990s) – A theological and philological treatise on the Divine Name "Allah", addressing its linguistic purity, scriptural authority, and historical usage in Islamic texts.
- کیا ابلیس عالم تھا؟ (Kya Iblees Aalim Tha?, c. 1999) – A study questioning whether Iblis (Satan) held scholarly knowledge, using Quranic exegesis and classical scholarship to analyze his defiance.
- اسلام میں شاعری کی حیثیت (Islam Mein Shayari Ki Hesiyat, early 2000s) – Discusses the role of poetry in Islamic heritage, defending it against critiques using hadith and examples from Sufi history.
- قرآنِ مجید کے آدابِ تلاوت (Qur'an Majeed ke Adaab-e-Tilawat, early 2000s) – Covers etiquette, pronunciation, and spiritual discipline required for Quranic recitation, aimed at both students and practicing Muslims.
- موازنہ علم و کرامت (Mawazna-e-Ilm o Karamat, 2004) – Explores the contrast and interdependence between intellectual knowledge ('ilm) and spiritual charisma (karamat) in the Sufi tradition.

=== Social Commentary & History (سماجی و تاریخی) ===
- پاکستان میں زلزلے کے تباہ کاریاں (Pakistan mein Zalzalay ke Tabahkariyan, 2005) – Reflects on the theological and societal consequences of natural disasters, particularly earthquakes, and links them to communal morality.
- مسلمانوں کے عروج و زوال کے اسباب (Musalmanon ke Urooj-o-Zawal ke Asbab, 2006) – Evaluates historical, ethical, and religious reasons for the rise and decline of Muslim civilizations.

=== Sufi Doctrine & Practice (تصوف و روحانیت) ===
- فتوی نویسی کے آداب (Fatwa Naveesi ke Adaab, c. 2007) – Lays out ethical and jurisprudential principles for issuing religious edicts, with emphasis on spiritual responsibility.
- پیرانِ پیر کی شخصیت، سیرت، تعلیمات (Peeran-e-Peer ki Shakhsiyat, Seerat, Taleemat, 2007) – A tribute to Abdul Qadir Jilani, presenting his teachings, ethics, and personality in a devotional yet scholarly manner.
- آئینہ شریعت میں پیری مریدی کی حیثیت (Aaina-e-Shari'at Mein Peeri-Mureedi Ki Hesiyat, 2008) – Investigates the role of Sufi mentorship within the framework of Islamic jurisprudence.
- فیضِ نسبت (Faiz-e-Nisbat, 2008) – A collection of guidance for spiritual seekers, combining prose and poetry to outline the importance of divine connection (nisbat).
- دستِ نظر (Dast-e-Nazar, 2009) – A reflective work on spiritual vision and insight, dealing with esoteric themes and unveiling.

=== Poetry & Literary Works (شاعری و ادبیات) ===
- پیمانِ شب (Paiman-e-Shab, 1983) – His first Urdu poetry collection, containing ghazals and devotional verse focused on divine love and the Prophet's praise.
- آغوشِ حیرت (Aaghosh-e-Hairat, 1987) – A set of Persian rubāʿiyyāt exploring divine wonder, the mystery of creation, and the human soul's yearning for God.
- راہ و رسمِ منزل‌ها (Rah-o-Rasm-e-Manzilha, 1990s) – Urdu ghazals that metaphorically document the Sufi path, capturing moments of spiritual longing, struggle, and ecstasy.
- لطمت الغیب علی ازالت الریب (Latmat-ul-Ghaib 'Ala Azalat-ur-Rayb, 1990s) – A unique collection that blends mystical verse with polemic against spiritual doubt, written in classical Urdu.
- ارشِ ناز (Arsh-e-Naaz, 2007) – A poetic tribute to Muhammad, blending Persian and Urdu poetic forms with deep metaphysical imagery.
- النظم رباعیات قادریہ (Al-Nazm: Rubāʿiyāt-e-Qadiriyya, 2007) – A set of Persian quatrains dedicated to the Qadiriyya order, often studied in Iranian academic circles.
- کلیات نصیر گیلانی (Kulliyat-e-Naseer Gilani, 2019, posthumous) – A complete anthology of his poetry across Urdu, Persian, and Punjabi, preserving his literary and spiritual legacy

== See also ==
- Golra Sharif
- Meher Ali Shah
