= Ram Mandir, Saidpur =

Hindu temple in Pakistan

- راما مندر
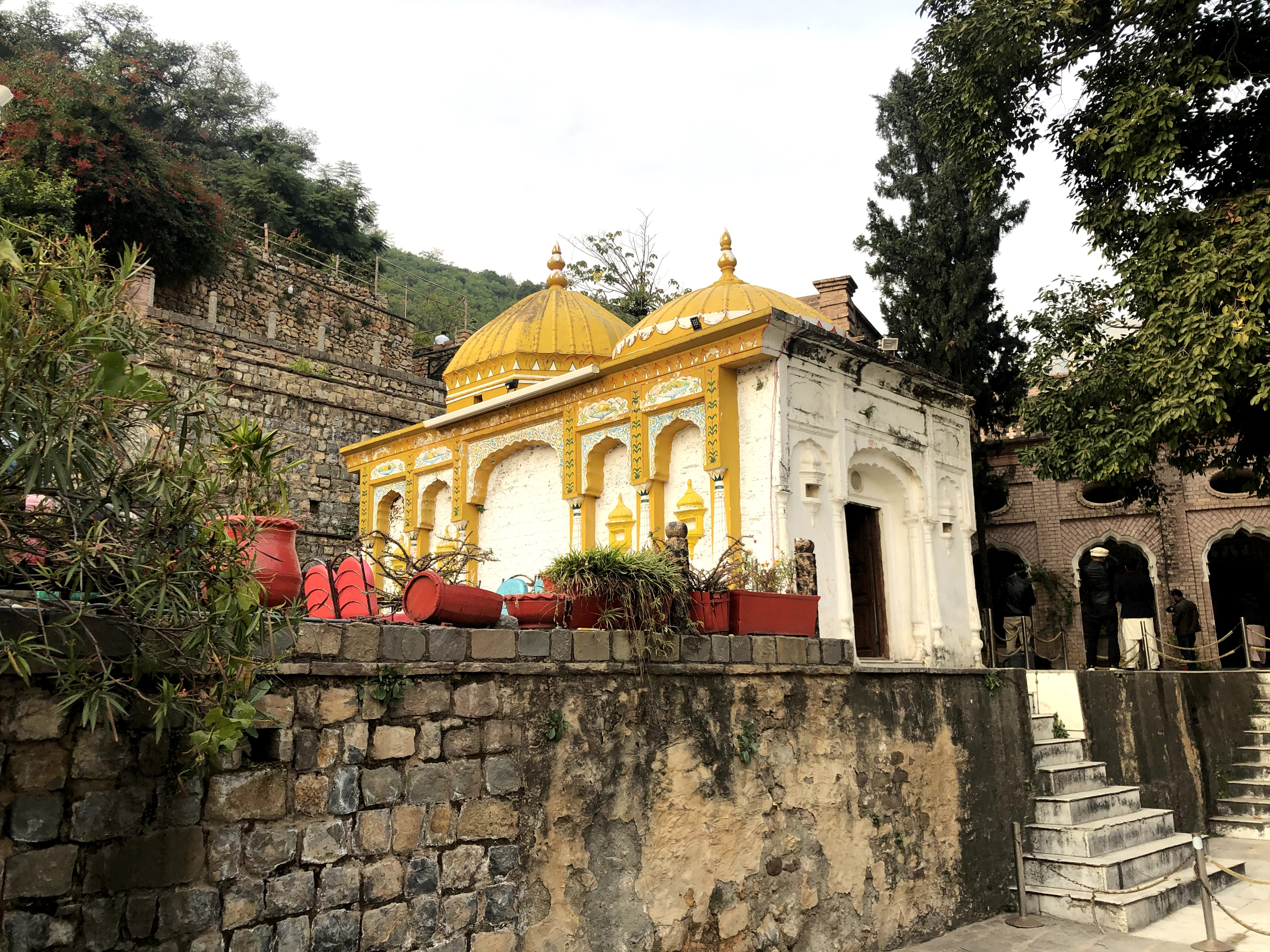
- View of Ram Mandir at Saidpur Village

- Location within Islamabad Capital Territory Location within Pakistan Location within Asia

Religion
- Affiliation: Hinduism
- District: Islamabad
- Deity: Shri Ram
- Status: Tourist Site

Location
- Location: Saidpur Village
- State: Islamabad Capital Territory
- Country: Pakistan
- Interactive map of Ram Mandir, Saidpur
- Coordinates: 33°44′41.2″N 73°04′04.8″E

Architecture
- Type: Hindu temple
- Founder: Man Singh I
- Established: 16th-century
- Completed: 16th-century

Ram Mandir, also known as Ram Kund Mandir, is situated in Saidpur Village, Islamabad, Pakistan. The temple is dedicated to the Shri Ram, who is believed to have lived in the area with his family during 14 years of their exile. The temple was built in the 16th century by Man Singh I.

== History ==
According to the legends, during the 14 year exile, Lord Ram, his wife Sita and his brother Lakshman arrived this region in the Margalla Hills and drank the water from the pond here.

The current temple structure was built by Raja Mann Singh around 1580. For centuries, Hindus travelled far and wide to worship at the temple, staying in an adjoining Dharamshala (rest house for pilgrims). According to official records of the Rawalpindi Gazetteer dating back to 1893, a fair was held each year at a pond near the site called "Ram Kund" to commemorate that Ram and his family had once sipped water from it. However, after the Partition of India in 1947, the temple building was no longer used as a place of worship. In 1960, the building was used as a girls' school for the local people. In 2006, it was converted into a tourist site.

Before Partition, annual Hindu fair used to be conducted during Baisakhi, which will be attended by around 8,000 people.

== Significance ==
The temple has a lot of significance to the Hindu community of Islamabad and Pakistan. It is believed that Lord Ram, Sita and Lakshman stayed in the region and drank the water from the pond here, which is now called Ram Kund. Lord Ram then went to Swat and later to Ram Takht. On his return journey to his hometown also he spent some time in the area. There are four ponds in the region named after each– Ram Kund, Sita Kund, Lakshman Kund and Hanuman Kund.

== Current Situation ==
In 2006, it was turned into a tourist site by the Capital Development Authority(CDA). As a result, all the idols have now been removed and the religious carvings were painted over by the CDA. The dharamshala has also been converted into a public toilet.

The Hindu community of Islamabad has been demanding to make the temple operational again. The PTI lawmaker Lal Chand Malhi argued that the tourists disregard the sanctity of the temple by walking inside the holy sanctum with their shoes. According to the Hindu community, the sanctity of the 3 temple ponds were also violated as the CDA has handed over them to restaurants serving meat dishes.

== See also ==
- Hinduism in Pakistan
- Evacuee Trust Property Board
- Hinglaj Mata
- Krishna Temple, Islamabad
