= Losar (disambiguation) =

Losar is a festival in Tibetan Buddhism.

Losar may also refer to:

- Losar Baoli, a stepwell in the Islamabad Capital Territory, Pakistan
- Losar Khas, Spiti valley, a village in Spiti valley, Himachal Pradesh, India

== See also ==
- Loser (disambiguation)
