= Ghulam Mohiyuddin Gilani =

Pakistani Sufi scholar (1891–1974)

- غلام محی الدین گیلانی
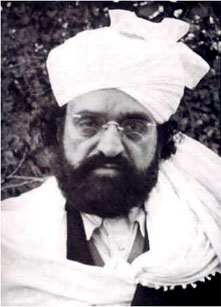
- Title: Pir, Syed

Personal life
- Born: December 1891 Golra Sharif, British India (present-day Pakistan)
- Died: 22 June 1974 (aged 83) Golra Sharif, Pakistan
- Children: Syed Ghulam Moinuddin Gilani; Syed Shah Abdul Haq Gilani
- Parent: Meher Ali Shah
- Other name: Babuji

Religious life
- Religion: Islam
- Order: Sufism Qadiriyya Chishti Order

Muslim leader
- Based in: Golra Sharif
- Predecessor: Meher Ali Shah

Peer Syed Ghulam Mohiyuddin Gilani (December 1891 - 22 June 1974), commonly called Babuji, was a Sufi scholar from Golra Sharif, Pakistan, belonging to the Chishti order. He was the son of Peer Meher Ali Shah and served as the sajjada nashin of the Golra Sharif shrine from 1937 to 1974.

== Education ==
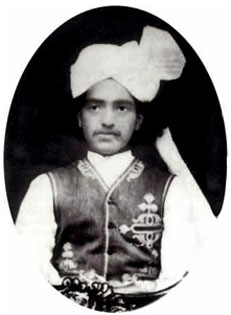
Ghulam Mohiyyuddin in his teens

He received his early education from Qari Abdul Rahman of Jawnpur and Maulana Muhammad Ghazi under the supervision of his father Peer Meher Ali Shah.

After completing his education, Ghulam Mohiyuddin received the caliphate (khilafat) from his father but was not prepared to take anyone as his murid (spiritual disciple) mainly due to his claim that he did not possess the merit that is required for extending bay'ah to others. Only after his father Meher Ali Shah assured that, “I agree to be responsible for anyone who takes bai'at at your hand.”, he started taking people as his murid.

== Beliefs ==
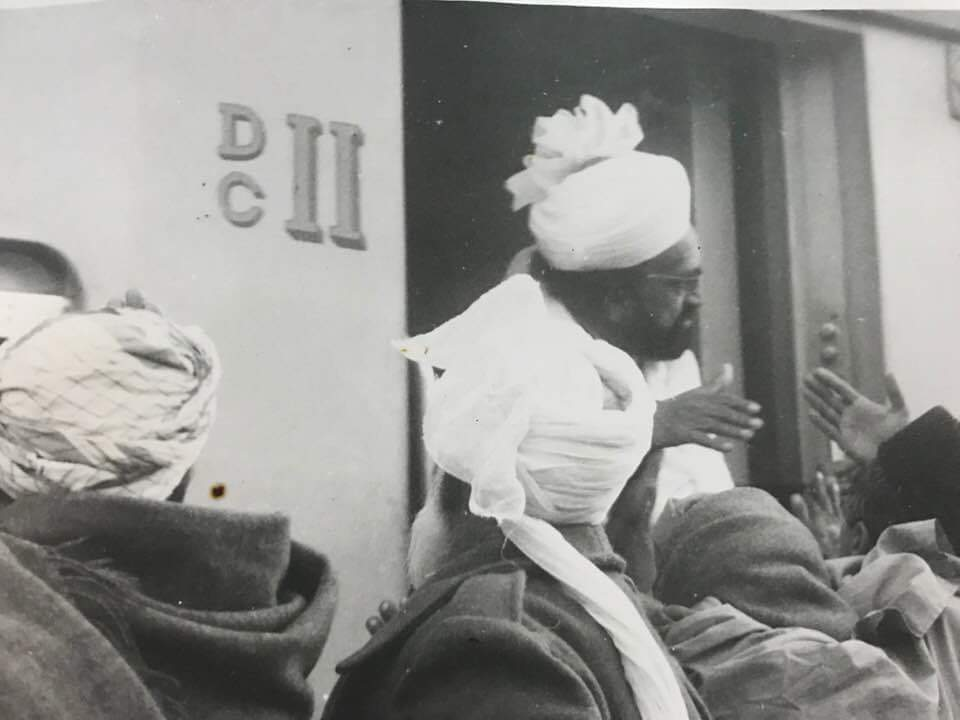
Ghulam Mohiyyuddin at Rawalpindi Railway Station

Following the example of his father, Ghulam Mohiyuddin was a firm adherent to the concept of Ibn Arabi's ideology of "Wahdat-ul-Wajood" (Ultimate Unity of Being). According to him, the Divine Will is at work behind all that is happening in the universe. The Divine Will which is absolute and everlasting manifests itself in the diverse aspects of this universe.

Ghulam Mohiyuddin was also a firm admirer of Jalāl ad-Dīn Muhammad Rūmī so much so that he is reported to have made his qawwal i.e; the person who performs Qawwali, memorize almost half of the Masnavi which was then performed at the shrine. His biography states that he would sometimes refer to Rumi as “Pir-e-Ma” (mine guide).

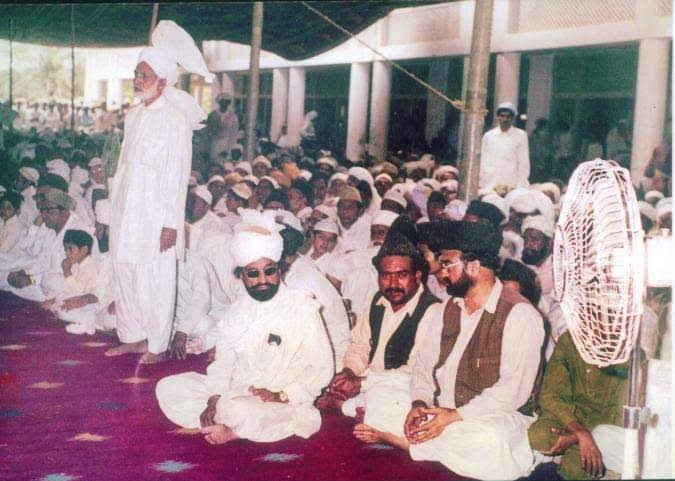
Ghulam Mohiyuddin presiding over an Urs ceremony at Golra Sharif. Both his sons can also be seen.

== Political activity ==
Ghulam Mohiyuddin supported the Pakistan Movement, encouraging the mass displacement of the population around the time of the Partition of India.

== Death ==
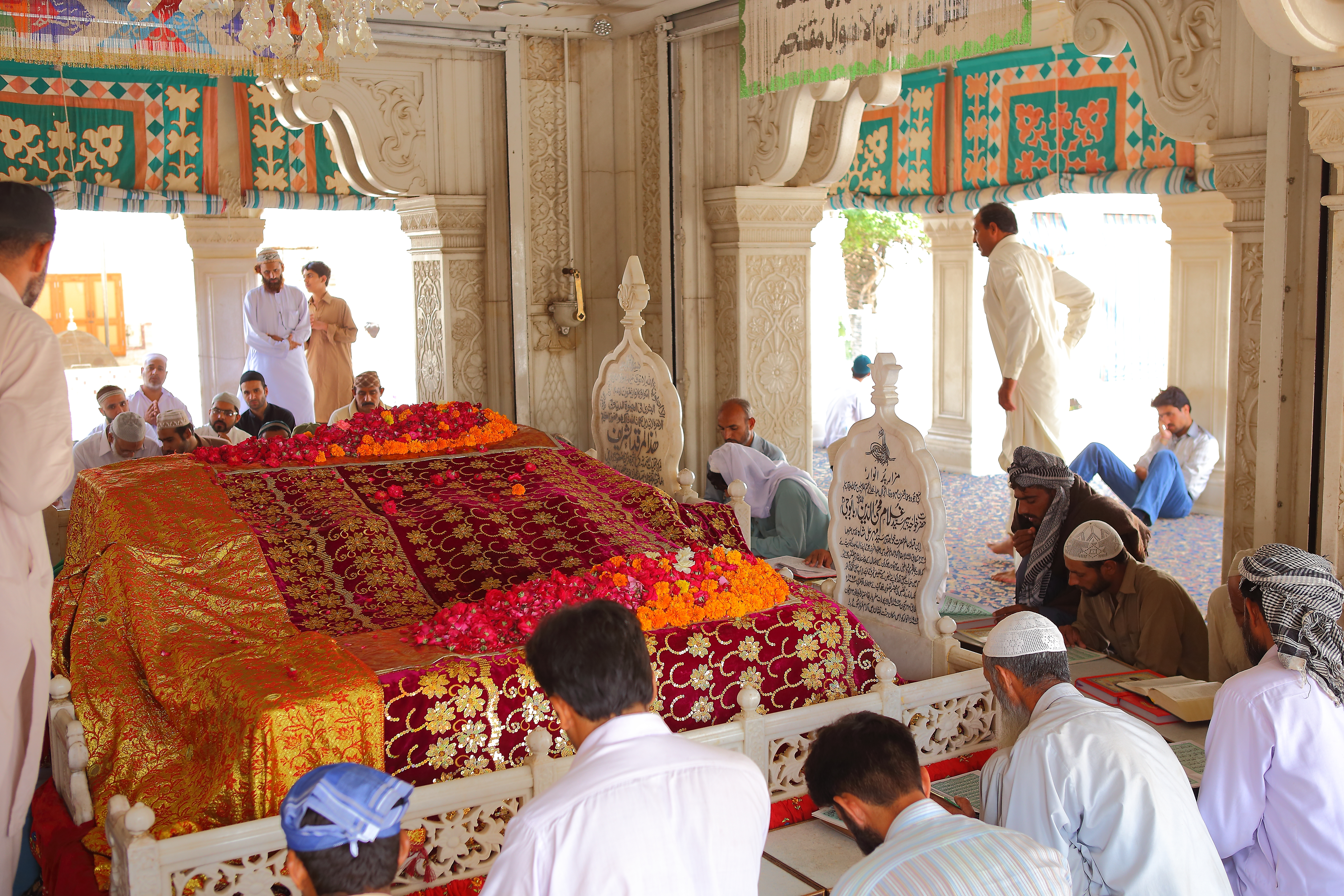
Visitors at the graves of Syed Ghulam Mohiyyuddin Gilani and his father Meher Ali Shah

Ghulam Mohiyuddin died on 22 June 1974 after prolonged illness and was buried next to his father in Golra Sharif.
