= Shah Allah Ditta =

Pakistani village

Shah Allah Ditta شاہ اللہ دتا شاہ اللہ دتہ
- Village
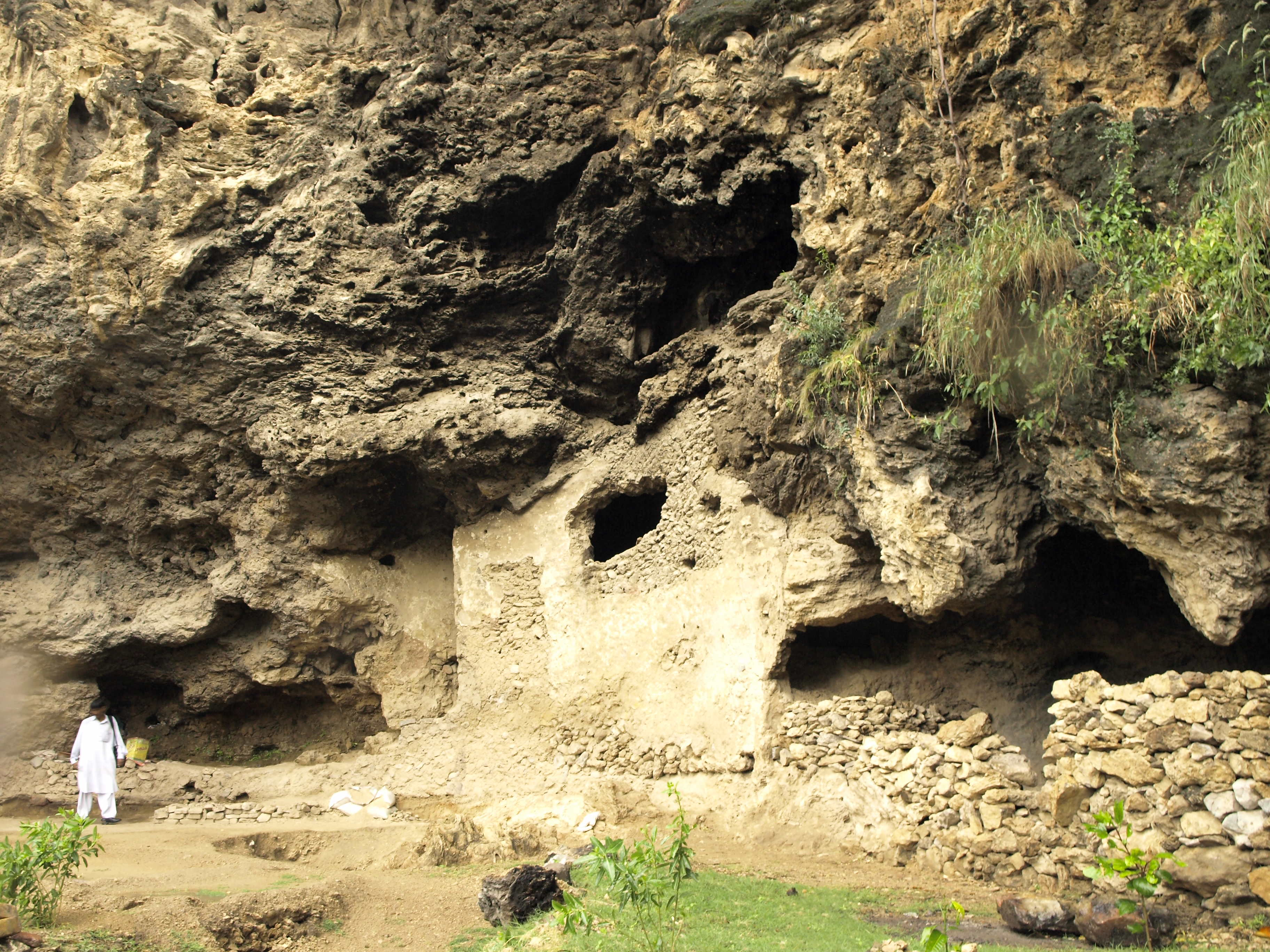
- Shah Allah Ditta's Sadhu da Bagh caves are an ancient Buddhist monastic site

- Location in Islamabad Capital Territory
- Coordinates: 33.7209642°N 72.9143201°E
- Country: Pakistan
- Adm. Unit: Islamabad Capital Territory
- Time zone: UTC+5 (PST)

Shah Allah Ditta (Punjabi: شاہ اللہ دتا; Urdu: شاہ اللہ دتہ) is a centuries-old village and a union council located at the foothills of the Margalla Hills in the Islamabad Capital Territory, Pakistan. It s located adjacent to Sector D-12 of Islamabad.

== Etymology ==
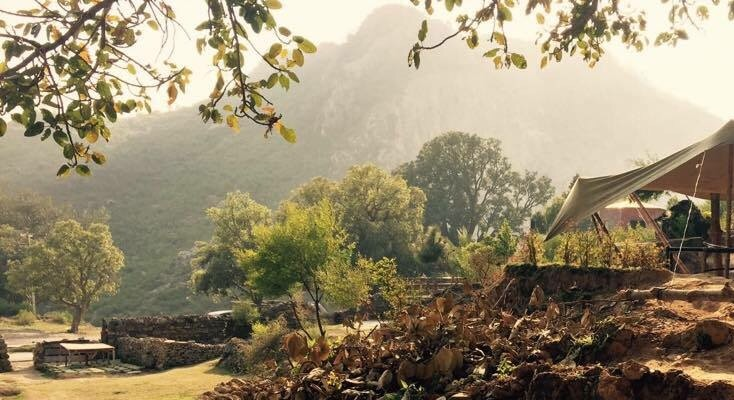
Shah Allah Ditta is based in a mountainous setting.

The village is named after a Punjabi Dervish who lived during the Mughal-era.

== History ==
The village is believed to be more than seven hundred years old and lies on the route which was used to travel from Kabul to the Gandharan city of Taxila by Alexander the Great and Sher Shah Suri, while Mughal rulers and other emperors often passed through while traveling from Afghanistan to the Indian subcontinent. Local people used to call that route Gernaili Road (Sher Shah's road), and some of its remnants are still visible today. It is said that Mughal emperor Akbar built a watering hole for travelers in this village.

== Archeology ==
Relics of the Buddhist era dating back to the 8th century can be found here along with burnt diyas and trees with amulets tied to them.

Shah Allah Ditta caves are located on the route leading towards Khanpur. These caves are next to the shrine and tomb of Shah Allah Ditta.

2,400-year-old Buddhist era murals of Buddha appear on the walls of caves at Shah Allah Ditta.

Archaeological evidence indicates that the caves and the platform-like formations surrounding the area were first used for meditation by Buddhist monks and later by Hindu sadhus before Muslim ascetics took over during the Mughal period.

Marked on the ground close to the caves the location where Alexander the Great arrived and was received by Raja Ambi, King of Taxila. The road next to the caves that leads to the main top of the mountain, Shah Allah Ditta road, is said to be built on the exact path followed by Afghan emperor Sher Shah Suri during his visit.

Moving up the mountain from the caves, there is a stepwell called Losar Baoli and a mosque built by Shahāb-ud-Din Ghori. The mosque has broken walls and the road leading to it is dilapidated.

== Preservation ==
- In October 2010, Capital Development Authority (CDA) finally approved the plan after realizing the importance to preserve this 2,400-year-old archeological site. The plan covers conservation of the Buddha caves as well as the adjacent garden known as 'Sadhu ka Bagh'. This is the second heritage site in Islamabad which has been targeted for preservation; the first was the historical Saidpur Village, also situated at the foothills of the Margallas.
- The Taxila Institute of Asian Studies, Quaid-i-Azam University, the Natural History Museum and Department of Architecture, and a recent effort by the Mass Communication Department of NUST has urged the government to preserve such sites of Mughal heritage.
- Embassy of Japan in Pakistan, reportedly offered to provide funds for the preservation of Shah Allah Ditta caves.

== Residential land ==
There is approx. 1,163.4 hectare land located in Shah Allah Ditta village and its surroundings.

As of July 2011, approx. 859.9 hectare land is privately owned, and approx. 303.5 hectares of land has been purchased by the housing society developers of sectors D-13, E-13 and C-13.

The federal government has only 1.5 hectares of land in and around Shah Allah Ditta.

== Margalla Ridge Trail ==
The village also serves as the starting point of the Margalla Ridge Trail. Inaugurated on 3 November 2018 as Pakistan's longest single trans-provincial trail, 15 of its 44 km length lies within Islamabad Capital Territory, while the rest passes through districts Abbottabad and Haripur districts of Hazara in the Khyber Pakhtunkhwa province. It passes through six villages, including Talhar (in Islamabad Capital Territory) and Lora (in Khyber Pakhtunkhwa), and has multiple exit points. It ends at Summa.

== Gallery ==
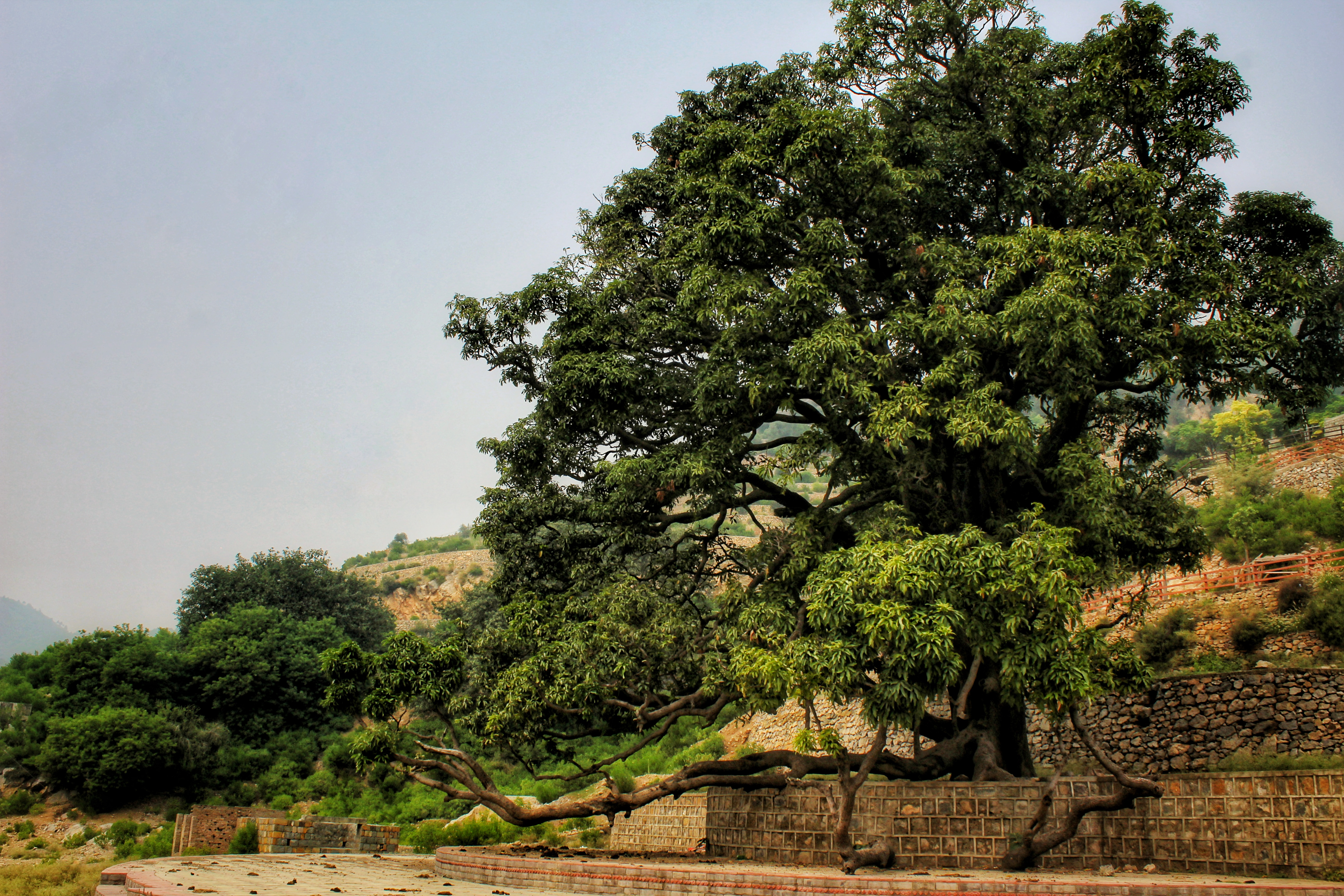
The Sadhu ka Bagh near the caves

== See also ==
- Saidpur Village
- Losar Baoli
- Developments in Islamabad
