= Saidpur Hatchery =

Bird hatchery in Pakistan

- Date opened: 1986
- Location: Saidpur, Islamabad Capital Territory, Pakistan
- No. of animals: 170
- Owner: Punjab Wildlife Department

Saidpur Hatchery is a hatchery and breeding center located in village of Saidpur in Islamabad Capital Territory, Pakistan. The hatchery was set up in village of Saidpur for breeding birds in 1986 by the Punjab Wildlife Department on a land allotted by the Capital Development Authority. It currently houses more than 170 birds of different kinds including peafowls.
