= Hinduism in Islamabad Capital Territory =

Hinduism in Islamabad, Pakistan

Hindus of Islamabad
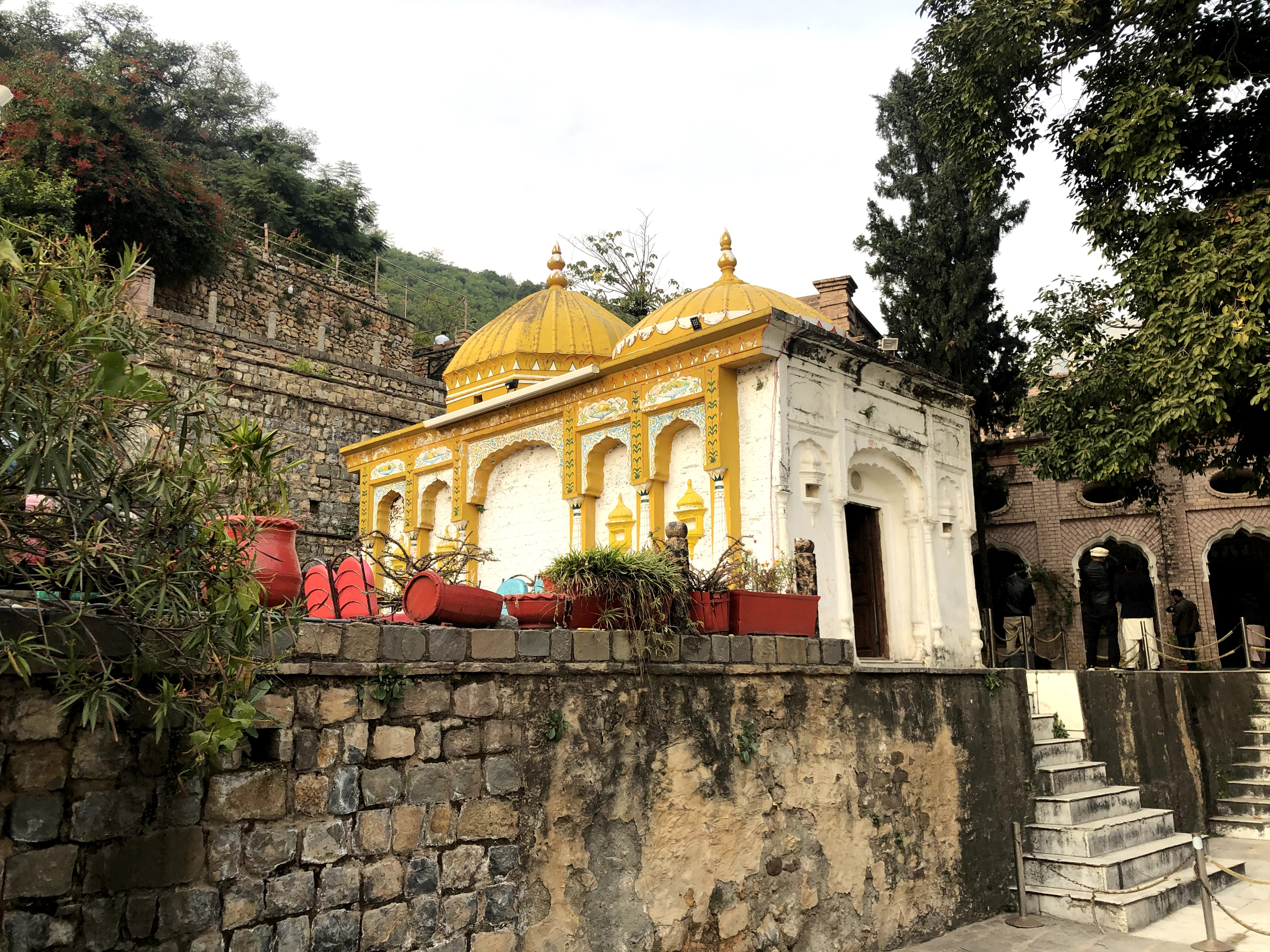
- The Rama Temple at Saidpur Village

Total population
- 883 ▲ (2023 census); 0.03% of total Islamabad Capital Territory population

Languages
- Sanskrit (sacred); Sindhi, Punjabi, Urdu

Hinduism is followed by a small minority of the population of Islamabad Capital Territory. It is followed by native hindus who have been living there for centuries and migrants from other parts of Pakistan who reside in the territory. There are also a small number of Non-Pakistani Hindus, mainly Indian diplomats, Hindu staff of western embassy and diplomats serving UN missions.

== History ==
The area surrounding modern Islamabad has a long and diverse religious history. The Shah Allah Ditta caves, located at the foot of the Margalla Hills, were used successively by Buddhist monks, Hindu sadhus, and later Muslim ascetics during the Mughal period. Near the Shah Allah Ditta village is the Saddhu Da Bagh, which is a Hindu priests garden and spring. Before Partition, Hindu families resided in Shah Allah Ditta village and used the caves for worship. Following their departure at Partition, custodianship of the site was passed to a Muslim family. In October 2010, the Capital Development Authority (CDA) approved a conservation plan for the caves and the adjacent garden, known as Sadhu ka Bagh.

Another historically significant site is the Ram temple in Saidpur Village, at the foot of the Margalla Hills. The temple was rebuilt by Raja Mann Singh around 1580. The Rawalpindi Gazetteer of 1893, describes about the fair held in the temple. The temple has been used by the Mughal Hindu commanders for worshipping. The temple served as a centre of worship for the local Hindu population prior to Partition. The CDA has since partially restored the temple complex as a heritage site; it no longer functions as an active place of worship.

== Demographics ==
Hindu population in Islamabad Capital Territory (ICT) has remained very low but growing. According to the 1998 census, 205 Hindus resided in the ICT, accounting for approximately 0.025% of the total population of 805,235. The 2017 census recorded 737 Hindus, comprising approximately 0.037% of the population. The 2023 census reported a Hindu population of 883 out of a total ICT population of 2,283,244, or approximately 0.039%.

Hindu Population in Islamabad Capital Territory
Year	Hindu Population	Percentage of Total Population
1972	112	0.05%
1981	36	0.01%
1998	205	0.025%
2017	737	0.037%
2023	883	0.039%

Community representatives have estimated the actual Hindu population in Islamabad at approximately 3,000, a figure that includes government and private-sector employees, members of the business community, and doctors.

== Places of worship ==
Islamabad Capital Territory has no fully operational Hindu temple. In 2016, the CDA allocated a half-acre plot in Sector H-9 for the construction of the Shri Krishna Mandir and a cremation site. Construction of the boundary wall commenced in June 2020 following a groundbreaking ceremony, but was halted on 4 July 2020 by the CDA on procedural grounds, amid opposition from religious groups. The boundary wall was subsequently vandalised. In October 2020, the Council of Islamic Ideology ruled that the construction was permissible under Islamic law and that the Hindu community had the right to a place for worship and the performance of last rites. As of 2025, construction of the temple has not begun.

The Ram temple in Saidpur Village is a historically significant site, though it is not maintained as an active place of worship.

=== Other Hindu sites ===
Several Hindu sites in the Islamabad area are no longer in use or accessible for worship. These include:

- Jira, near Bobri village: Believed to derive from Yatra or Jiva, this was a pilgrimage site where women offered cloth to the deity in thanksgiving for fulfilled wishes.
- Sacred rocks in Peja village: A natural grouping of three standing stones, held to represent a divine Hindu trinity.
- Bagh Jogian: A site formerly used by Nath Jogis for ascetic practice; later repurposed by Muslim communities.
- Sacred tree in Gora Mast village: Worshipped by Hindus before Partition; subsequently Islamised, with the original beliefs supplanted by new local narratives.
- Rawal Lake temple: A rectangular structure with arched openings and steps leading to the sanctum, located in what was formerly Rawal village. The structure survives in a deteriorated condition.
- Other temples in Rawal village: At least two further temples formerly existed in the village, including one with eight arches. The Gurukal temple was submerged when Rawal Dam was constructed.
- Samadhi near Rawal Chowk: A small domed structure associated with a Nath Jogi ascetic, part of the village landscape before Partition.
- Golra temple: Located near the old bazaar behind the haveli of the Pir of Golra Sharif, the structure retains carved pillars and a shikhara with faded paintings depicting Hindu deities. It survives in a deteriorated condition.
- Nath Jogi site near Bari Imam: A lesser-known site approximately 2 km west of Bari Imam, formerly used as a stop by travelling jogis; now disused.

== Community Life ==
As of 2025, Islamabad Capital Territory has no fully operational Hindu temple or officially sanctioned cremation facility. Religious observances such as Diwali and Holi are typically held in private homes or embassy compounds, or in temples in neighbouring Rawalpindi. For cremations, the Hindu community must travel outside the capital territory.

Most Hindus residing in Islamabad are migrants from Sindh, Balochistan, and Khyber Pakhtunkhwa.

In 2017, Hindu Marriage Act was passed which gives legal ground for Hindu marriages performed in Islamabad Capital Territory along with Balochistan, Khyber-Pakhtunkhwa and Punjab. The law was notified through notification Islamabad Capital Territory Hindu Marriage Rules 2023.

== See also ==
- Hinduism in Balochistan
- Hinduism in Khyber Pakhtunkhwa
- Hinduism in Punjab, Pakistan
- Hinduism in Sindh
- Hindu temples in Pakistan
