= Losar Baoli =

Coordinates: 33°43′48″N 72°55′36″E

Losar Baoli (the Losar Stepwell) is a stepwell in the Margalla Hills of the Islamabad Capital Territory, Pakistan. It is located near the town of Shah Allah Ditta in the Potohar Plateau. The area was a passageway for caravans and armies moving along the east–west direction.

It is constructed using dressed bricks. The well can be accessed from Shah Allah Ditta in Sector D-13, via the Kenthla-Haripur Road, established in 2007 by a federal minister. With a 1.8 meter diameter, the well continues to supply water to local residents for their daily needs. Its surroundings, filled with trees and bird songs, provide a restful spot for locals and travelers.

== Gallery ==
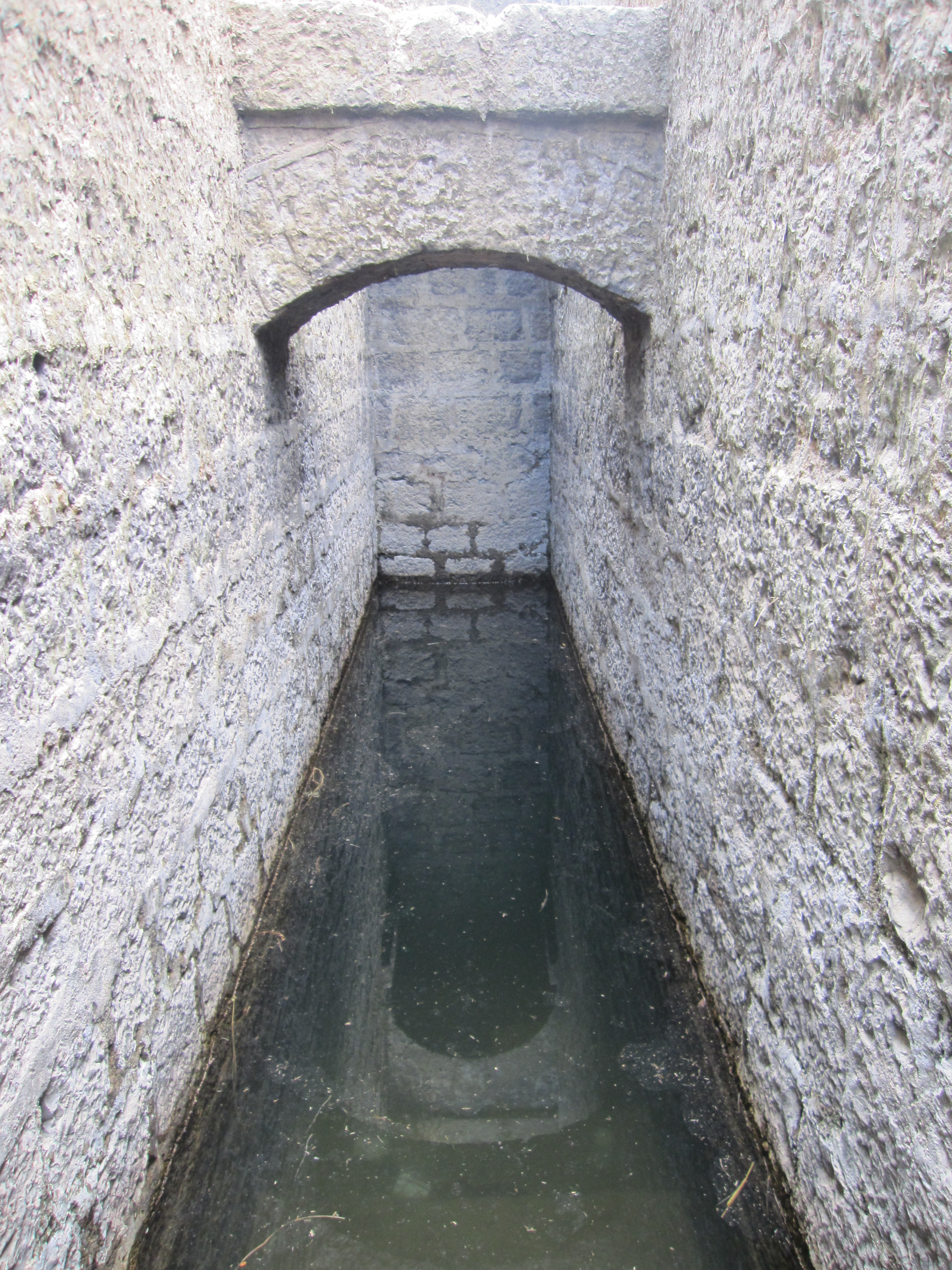
Down the steps of the Losar Baoli

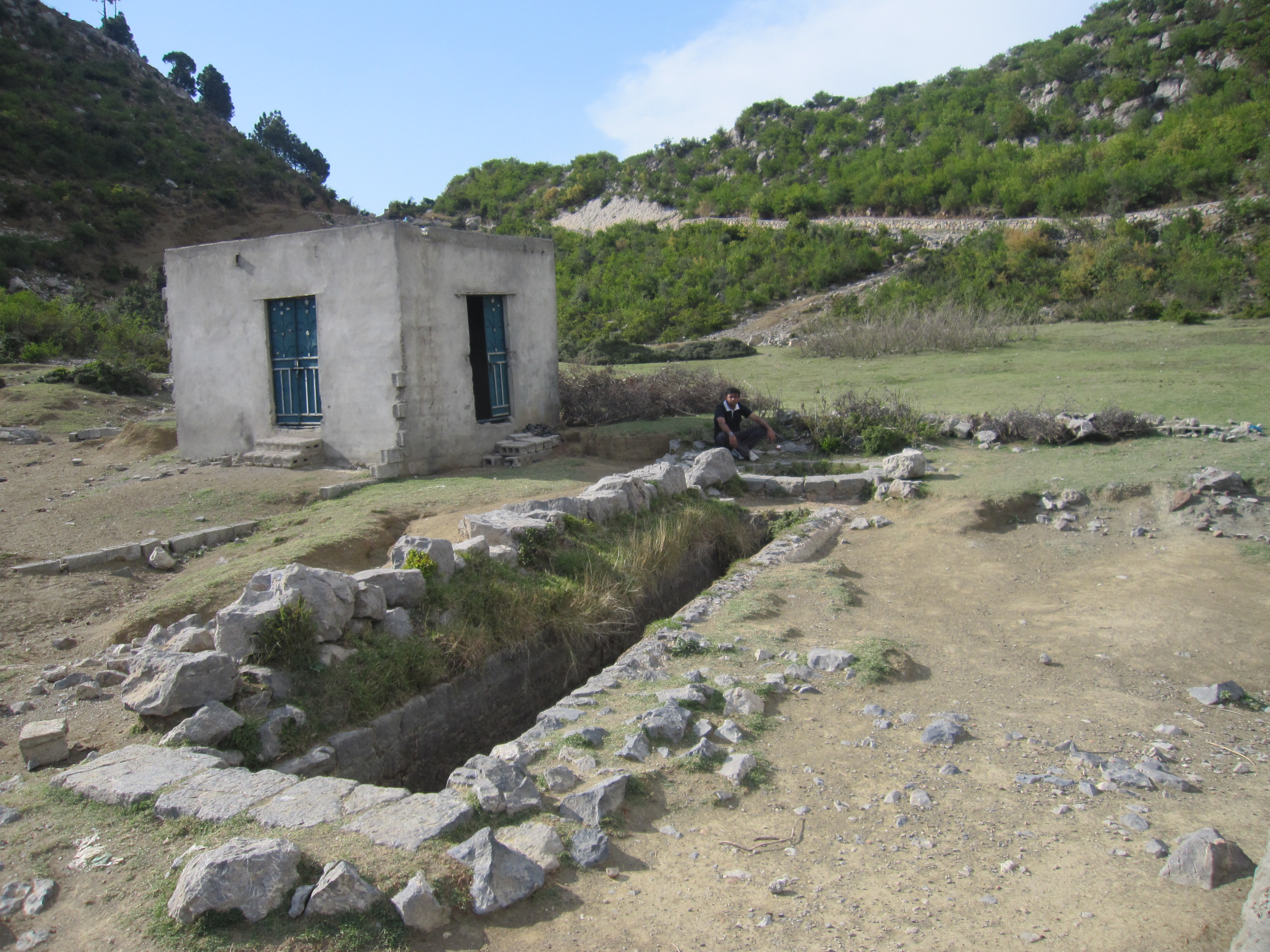
A view of the baoli from ground level

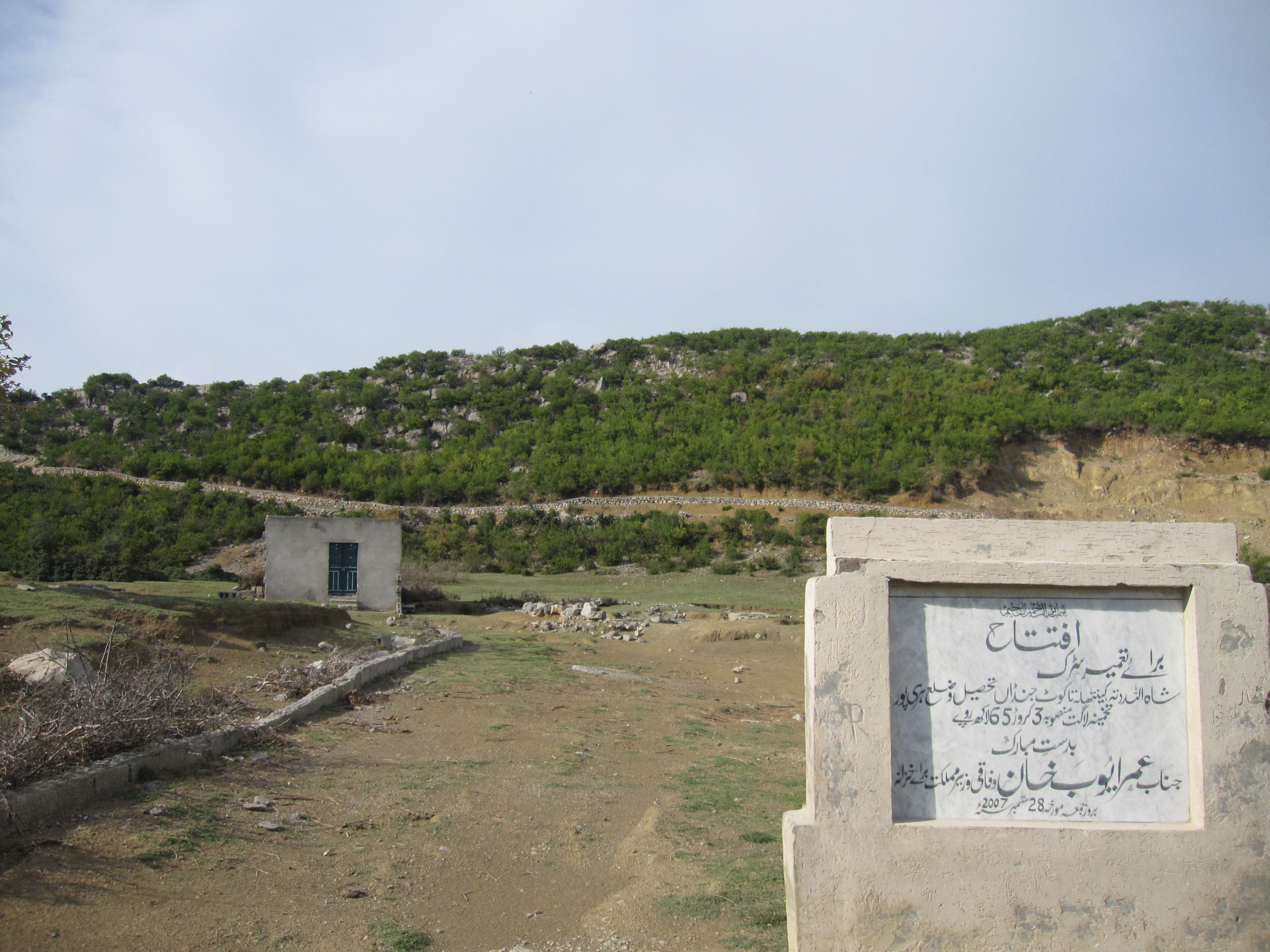
The landmark at the end of the road coming from Shah Allah Ditta
