= Saidpur, Islamabad =

Saidpur سیدپور Fatehpur Baoli
- Village
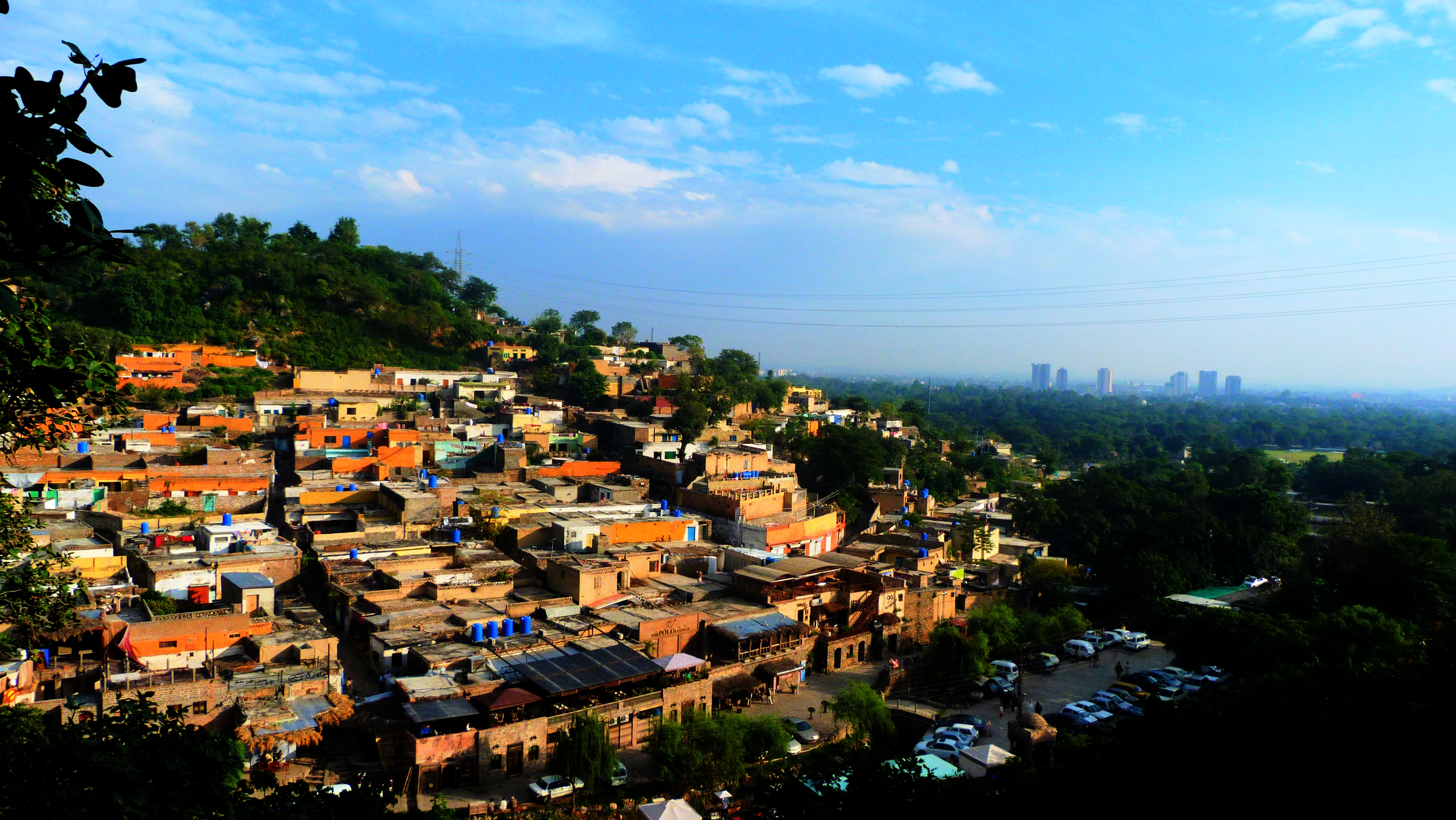
- A view of Saidpur Village
- Interactive map of Saidpur
- Coordinates: 33.742077°N 73.067708°E
- Country: Pakistan
- Administrative region: Islamabad Capital Territory
- Founded: 1530
- Founder: Mirza Fateh Ali
- Named for: Sultan Said Khan

Government
  - Chairman: Shiraz Kiyani
- Elevation: 620 m (2,030 ft)

Population
  - Estimate (2015): 12,000−15,000
- Time zone: UTC+5 (PST)
- Calling code: 051

Saidpur (Urdu: سیدپور) is a village and union council (UC-1) located in a ravine in Pakistan in the Margalla Hills, near the Daman-e-Koh overlook, in the Islamabad Capital Territory. It is a Mughal Era village that has a wide spectrum of religious and cultural heritage. It serves as a tourist spot for locals as well as foreigners.

The village also has an animal market, which provides a source of income to its dwellers. Some shops sell locally made pottery items and handicrafts. A 2015 estimate puts the village's population at between 12,000 and 15,000.

== History ==
=== Establishment and early years ===
The area around the village has been a part of several civilizations, including the Gandhara, the Buddhists, the Greeks, Ashoka of the Maurya Empire, the Mughal Empire, and the British Raj. One of the oldest villages in the region that is still inhabited, Saidpur was founded in 1530 by Mirza Fateh Ali. It was named Fatehpur Baoli after its founder. The village was transferred to Said Khan Gakhar by Emperor Akbar as a reward for the Gakhar family's services in the war effort against Sher Shah Suri. As a result, the settlement was renamed to 'Saidpur'. Sultan Said Khan was the son of Sultan Sarang Khan, a chief of the Potohar area during the reign of Mughal Emperor Babur.

Several years later, Said Khan's daughter married Akbar's son, Saleem (who later ascended the throne as Emperor Jahangir). Her father gave her Saidpur as a wedding gift. Tuzk-e-Jahangiri, Jahangir's autobiography, mentions his stay at a village "beyond Rawalpindi", believed to be Saidpur, en route to Kabul. The village was a garden resort at that time, and a natural spring flowed across it, providing water for drinking and irrigation.

=== Use as a Hindu site ===
The village was later set up as a place for Hindu worshippers by commander Raja Man Singh, who visited the site in 1580. Several ponds were built and named after characters from the epic Ramayana (including Hanuman Kunda, Lakshaman Kunda, Rama Kunda, and Sita Kunda), and temples were also constructed. Hindus from Rawalpindi used to gather there and celebrate Baisahkhi.

=== Interfaith harmony ===
In the 20th century, a gurdwara was constructed adjacent to the temple by the Sikhs, which served as a school for spreading the teachings of Guru Nanak. Until the partition of the subcontinent in 1947, Waheguru and the goddesses Lakshmi and Kali were worshipped next to each other. A church and a mosque were also located nearby, as was the shrine of Zinda Pir (Living Saint), symbolizing interfaith harmony.

=== CDA renovation ===
In 2006, the Capital Development Authority started work on the renovation of the village on a budget of 400 million rupees (3.26 million dollars). It was remodelled as an Arts and Crafts Village, with the objective of preserving its 500-year old multi-cultural heritage and developing it as a tourist spot. Historical buildings were refurbished, the mud houses of the locals were given a facelift, and the water stream was cleaned. A museum displaying old pictures of Islamabad was also opened in the north-west corner.

In addition to that, CDA preserved the old School building, old Sufi tomb, and preserved Hindu temple and Gurdwara as well. Nomad Art Gallery, artistic restaurants, and cafes were also developed thus making it one of major tourist attractions in Islamabad.

== Rama Temple ==
Saidpur Village is home to a small 16th-century temple called Rama Mandir or Ram Kund Temple, dedicated to the Hindu god Rama. Hindus believe that he lived in the area with his family during 14 years of their exile. According to official records dating to 1893, a fair was held each year at a pond near the site called "Ram Kund" to commemorate that Ram and his family had once sipped water from it. For centuries, Hindus have travelled from far and wide to worship at the temple, staying in an adjoining dharamshala (rest house for pilgrims). However, all the idols have since been removed, and, since 1947, the temple has not been used as a place of worship. Between 1960 and 2006, the temple building was used as a girls' school. At that time CDA took possession of it and converted it to a tourist site.

The local Hindu community has expressed its desire for the temple to be reopened, since the nearest temple in the vicinity is in Rawalpindi. Residents believe that tourists disregard the sanctity of the place by walking inside it while wearing shoes. Carvings of goddesses have been painted over by the CDA, and the sites of the former ponds have been taken over by restaurants. Natural streams and ponds in the vicinity now contain sewage.

== Marghzar Cricket Ground ==
Considered as one of the oldest cricket grounds in Islamabad located in Saidpur village. Marghzar Cricket Ground is primarily used for domestic level cricket.

== See also ==
- Saidpur Hatchery
- Hinduism in Islamabad Capital Territory
- Developments in Islamabad
