= Golra Sharif Railway Museum =

Railway museum in Pakistan

- گولڑہ شریف ریلوے موزه
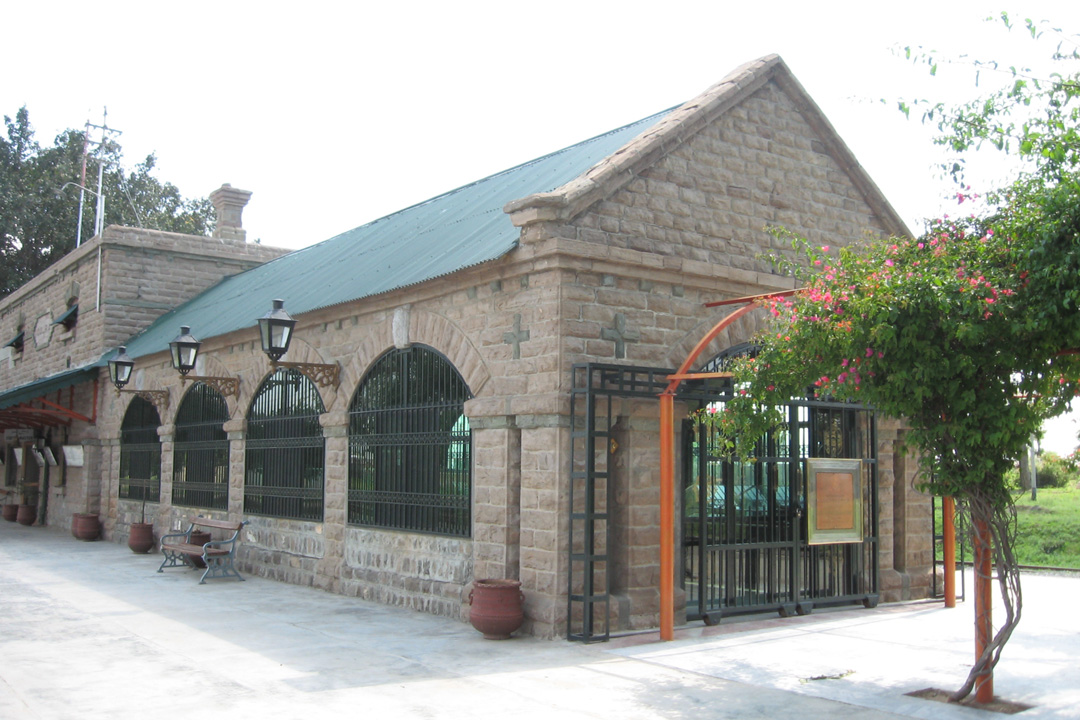
- Established: 26 September 2003; 23 years ago
- Location: Golra Sharif Junction railway station, Islamabad, Pakistan
- Coordinates: 33°40′14″N 72°56′52″E
- Type: Railway Museum
- Owner: Pakistan Railways

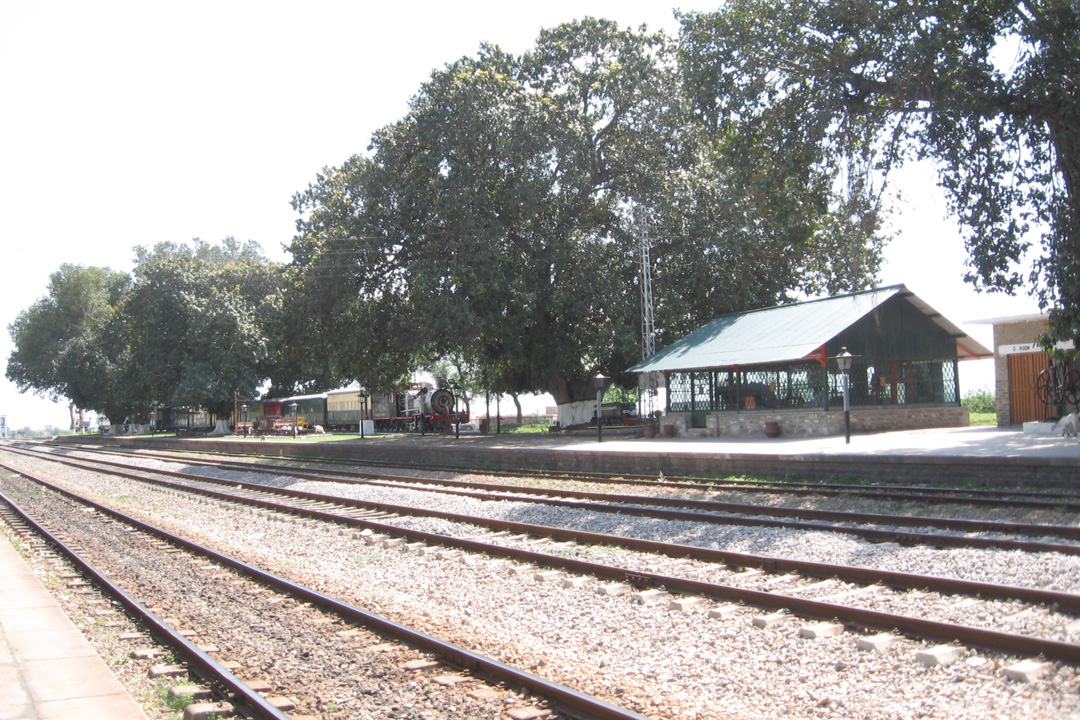
A view of Golra Sharif Railway Museum

Golra Sharif Railway Museum, also known as Pakistan Railways Heritage Museum, is a railway museum located near Sector F-13 of Islamabad, Pakistan. It is located at the Golra Sharif railway station, a junction station in the Rawalpindi Division of Pakistan Railways, located at 1,994 feet above sea level, in the southeast of the Margalla Hills and east of the cradle of Gandhara civilization, the ancient city of Taxila.

Established in 2003 and renovated in 2018, the railway museum consists of two galleries housing the relics and memorabilia associated with more than 150 years of rail heritage dating back to the days of the British Raj. The railway station, with its museum, is a major attraction for tourists and locals alike and is becoming a major attraction for railway enthusiasts.

== Golra Sharif Junction railway station ==
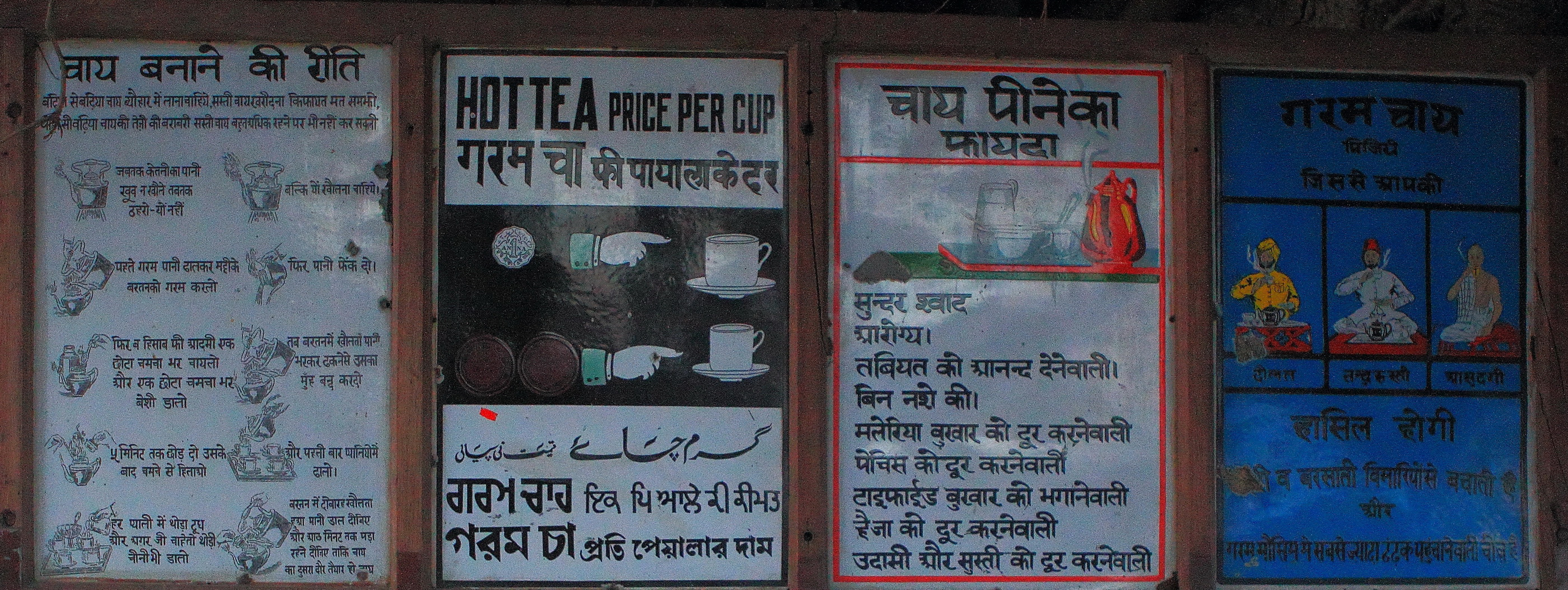
An original sign for 'Hot Tea' (Garam Chai) at the Golra Sharif Junction Railway Station in Hindi, Urdu, Punjabi, Bengali and English, five major languages used in British India.

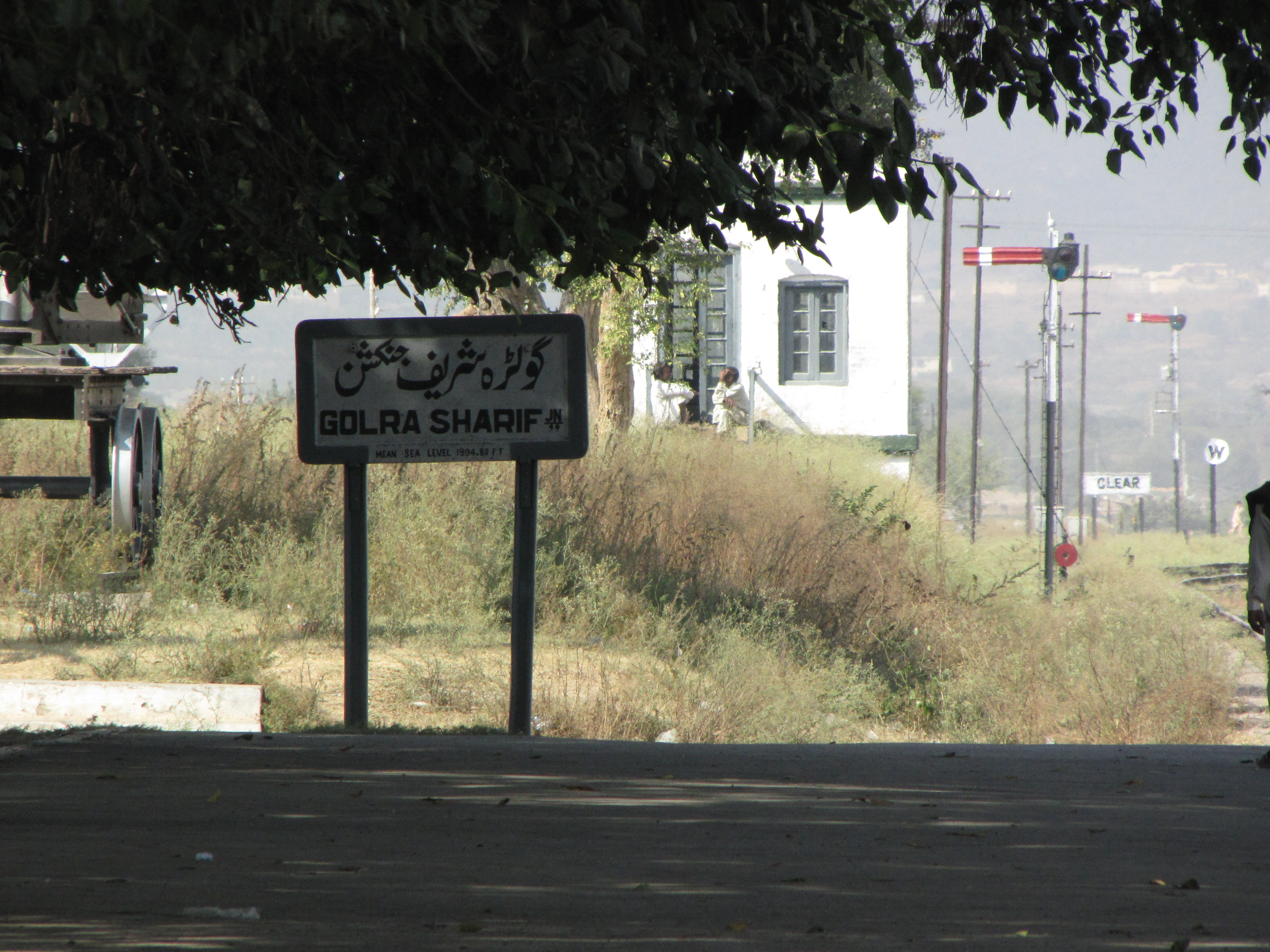
Golra Sharif Railway Station

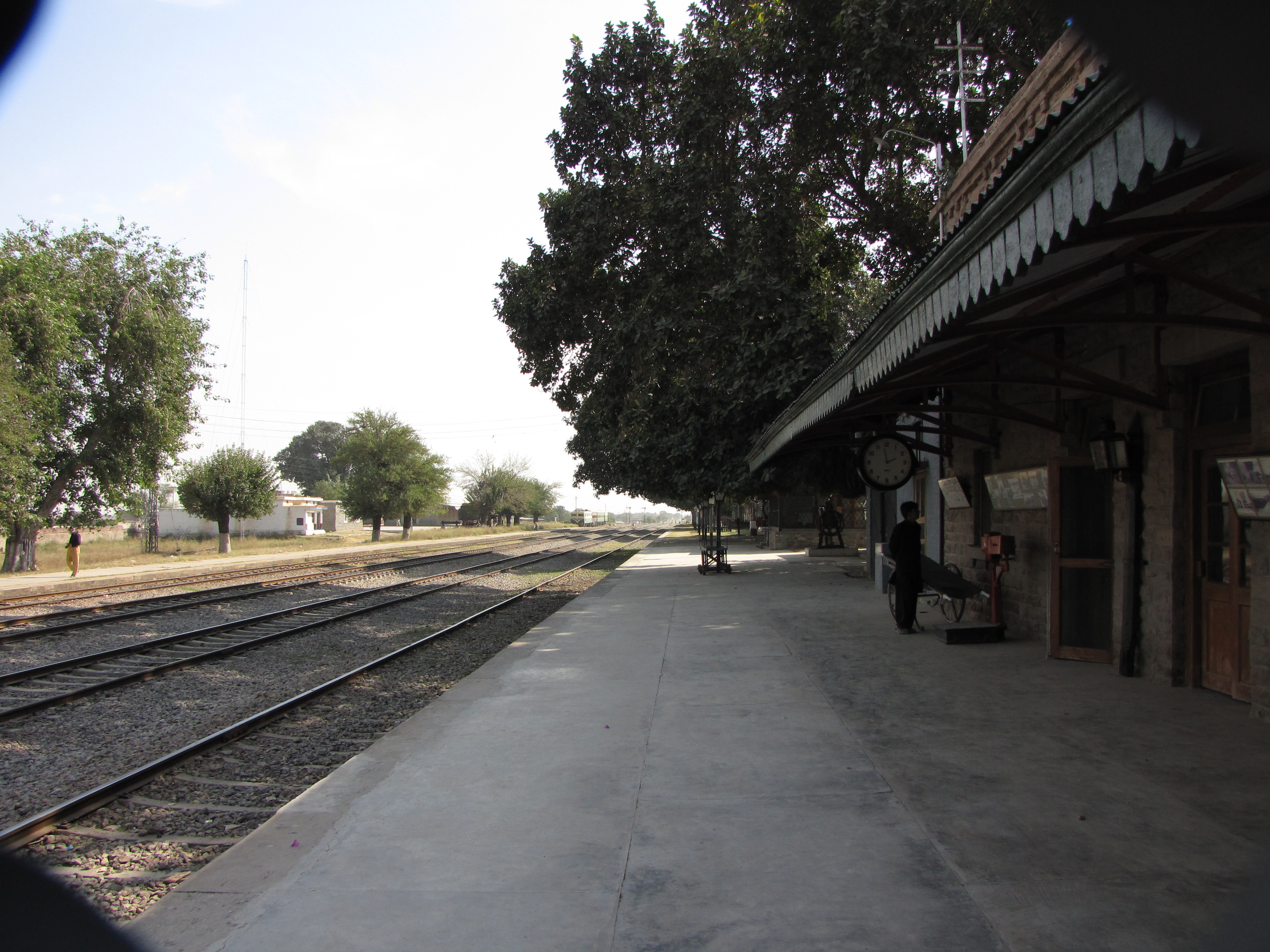
A platform on the Golra Sharif Railway Station

The Golra Sharif Junction railway station lies on the main line of the Pakistan Railways which connects the rest of the country in the south and Peshawar in the north. More than 20 trains pass through this station every day.

It is situated southwest of Islamabad, the capital of Pakistan, at the altitude of 1,994 feet. Its magnificent building has Victorian architecture and is composed of yellow stone masonry. It consists of five hall-like rooms. The station that once linked Peshawar, Kohat, Havelian, and Multan now enjoys more importance due to its museum.

The station was established in 1882 during British rule and upgraded as junction in 1912. It was the logistics artery of British India during the Afghan military campaigns at the turn of the twentieth century. It has since become an important trade route which protrudes into Afghanistan through the famous Khyber Pass.

== The museum ==
=== Development ===
The museum was envisioned by Ishfaq Khattak, the DS of the Rawalpindi division. In late 2002, the headquarters issued instructions to all the divisions of the Pakistan railways to scrap all the old items including crockery, furniture, locomotives, and saloons for narrow gauge lines. Ishfaq Khattak saw this as an opportunity to accumulate all the relics and create a heritage site. By the end of 2003, this feat was achieved mostly due to the diligence of officers working on the project without any funding from the government. Pure unabated love for the railways had been the major driving force towards the completion of this venerated project. Though the museum was inaugurated officially on 5 March 2007, it had already opened its doors to the public on 26 September 2003.

=== Collection ===
The Railway Heritage Museum was established in October 2003. From relics dating back to the inception of railways in the subcontinent by the British, to memorabilia depicting the creation of the museum are housed and preserved in this heritage site. The Rail Heritage Museum is housed in two halls to contain artifacts reflecting history of railway over a period of more than 150 years including almost 100 years of undivided India.

As a part of the museum, there is a big yard where cranes, trolleys, saloons, locomotives, coaches, and tracks are marshaled impressively, portraying the railway’s march forward through time. The museum houses an impressive blend of artifacts covering the many facets of the railways systems. Mechanical models, signalling systems, communication tools and the evolution of operational protocols are preserved and chronologically displayed in the museum.

The museum also displays the social impact and anthropological implications of the railways on the human geography of the multi-racial sub continent. An open yard displays a wide array of relics which have become extinct on the railway lines around the world. The steam and electric locomotives, a German postal car, a saloon car used by the last Indian viceroy, Lord Mountbatten, and another 1888 saloon car belonging to the Maharaja of Jodhpur, made at the Ajmer Sharif Carriage Workshop from the Jodhpur railways given as a wedding present to his daughter are a few examples.

=== Relics ===
The railway museum boasts of a very special collection of memorabilia from different periods in time from the British Raj to the occupation of Indian-held railway station during the 1965 war with India. May it be the saloon cars of yore or the long-forgotten steam locomotives, this museum has got it all. Everything has been fully preserved given the limited resources and a fledgling organization of Pakistan Railways. A new building has been erected on the premises to be converted into an art gallery and a café.

The majority of the items displayed at the museum belonged to the North West Railways, as Pakistan Railways was called before Independence, dating back to the year 1890. The intention is to preserve and display vintage items and artifacts related to the history of railways at the museum.

=== Renovation ===
Renovation work at the museum was inaugurated by Khawaja Saad Rafique, the Railways Minister, on 20 April 2018.

== Public interest ==
The heritage site and the beautiful serene looking railway station has become one of the centerpieces of the railway image in the country. The heritage project provided the impetus of the resumption of a steam safari in different areas of Pakistan. A mighty steam locomotive hauling luxury coaches across the beautiful scenic routes of the plains of Punjab or the rolling hills of the north west has become a romantic sight. This has generated an immense public interest with respect to tourism and entertainment.

=== Portrayal in pop culture ===
Since then the museum has been repeatedly highlighted in TV commercials and the site has been used by numerous TV plays and films. It has become the station of choice for the entertainment industry as they have become frequent visitors to this beautiful location. This station can be seen in numerous advertisements adorning the billboards and TV screens.

=== Tourism ===
Dignitaries, whether related to railways or not, have frequently visited as this heritage museum has become a huge source of attraction to people because of its uniqueness. Schoolchildren are specially brought to this place as the concept of train travel is diminishing fast, especially within the new generations. The number of tourists has also increased following the resumption of the steam safari which takes tourists to the archeological digs at Taxila, the center of the Gandhara civilization.

== See also ==
- List of museums in Pakistan
- Golra Sharif Junction railway station
