= Meher Ali Shah =

Punjabi Sufi scholar and poet (1859–1937)

Pir Syed Meher Ali Shah
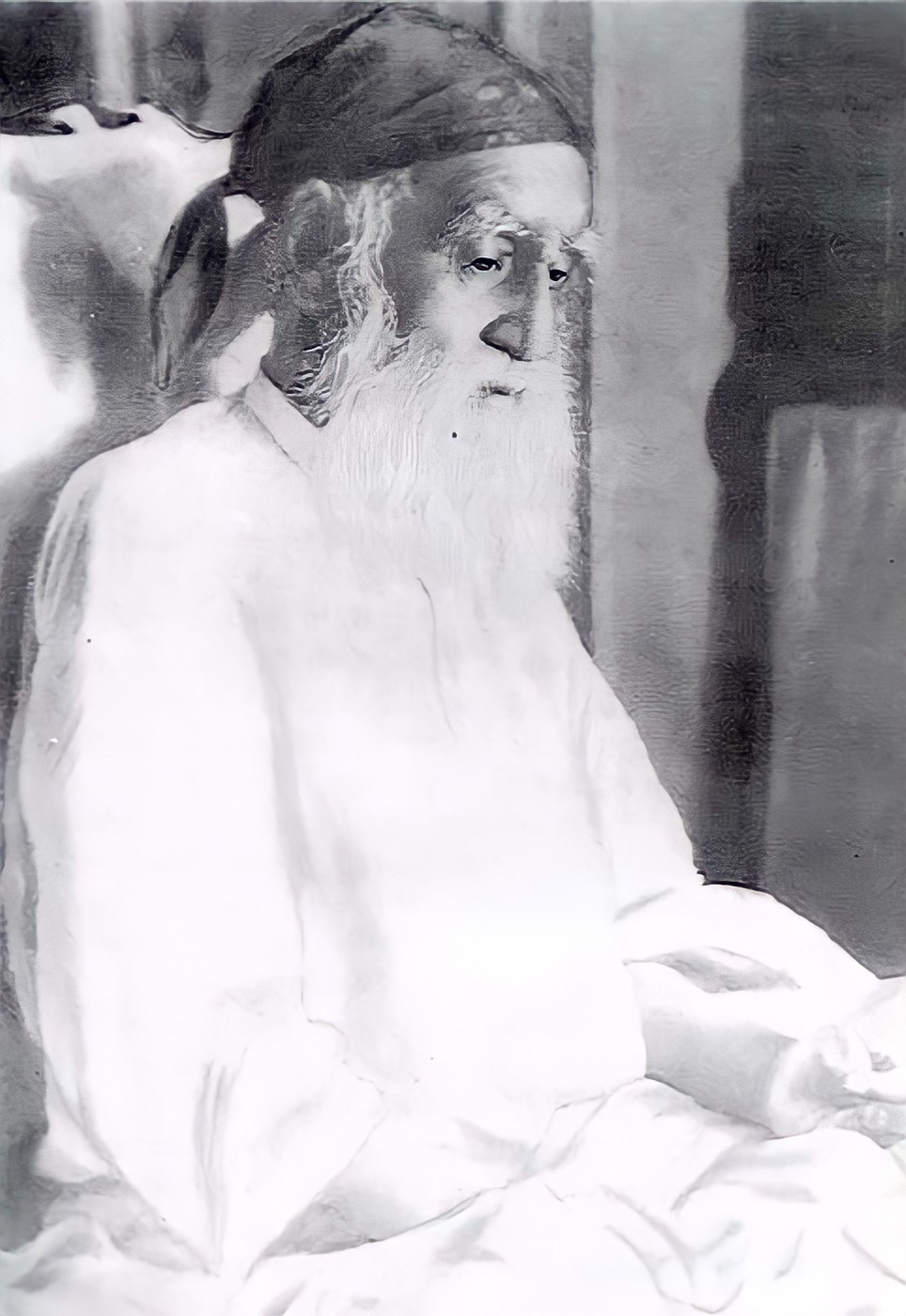
- Pir Meher Ali Shah
- Title: Pir, Syed

Personal life
- Born: 14 April 1859 (1 Ramadan 1275 A.H.) Golra Sharif, Punjab, British India (present-day Islamabad, Pakistan)
- Died: May 1937 (aged 78) Golra Sharif, Punjab, British India
- Children: Ghulam Mohiyyuddin Gilani
- Parents: Nazar Din Shah (father); Masuma Mawsufa (mother)

Religious life
- Religion: Islam
- Denomination: Sunni
- Order: Sufism Qadiriya Chishti Order
- Jurisprudence: Hanafi

Muslim leader
- Based in: Golra Sharif
- Predecessor: Sial Sharif
- Successor: Ghulam Mohiyyuddin Gilani

Pir Meher Ali Shah (Punjabi: پیر مہر علی شاہ, pronounced [piɾ mɛɦəɾ əli ʃaːɦ]; 14 April 1859 – May 1937) was a Punjabi Muslim Sufi scholar and mystic poet from Punjab, British India (present-day Pakistan). Belonging to the Chishti order, he is known as a Hanafi scholar who led the anti-Ahmadiyya movement. He composed poetry in Punjabi, and wrote several books in both Urdu and Persian, most notably Saif-e-Chishtiyai ("The Sword of the Chishti Order"), a polemical work criticizing the Ahmadiyya movement of Mirza Ghulam Ahmad.

Shah was a descendant, from his father Nazar Din Shah's side, of Abdul Qadir Jilani in the 25th generation, and of the Islamic prophet Muhammad through Hassan ibn Ali in the 38th generation.

== Early life and education ==
Shah received his early religious education at a khanqah (school at a mausoleum) and was attended classes in Urdu and Persian at the local madressah. After completing his education at Angah at the age of 15, he decided to continue further studies in the United Provinces (U.P.) of British India, in present day Uttar Pradesh. He therefore set out for higher education in different parts of India such as Lucknow, Rampur, Kanpur, Aligarh, Bhui, and Saharanpur, which were the then known major centers of Islamic religious education. His stay at Aligarh at the madrasah of Lutfullah of Aligarh was for two and a half years.

=== Historic mosque's construction ===
In the old city of Rawalpindi, a historic Mughal style mosque (Markazi Jamia Masjid) was built in 1903 as a symbol of Muslim unity with donations by Rawalpindi's Muslim community. This mosque was completed in two years and was inaugurated by the Sufi saint of Golra Sharif, Pir Meher Ali Shah along with the deposed king of Afghanistan Ayub Khan who was living in Rawalpindi at the time.

Prominent Muslim figures of the Sub-Continent such as Maulana Zafar Ali Khan, a leader of Pakistan movement, Attaullah Shah Bukhari, a leader of Congress aligned party Majlis-e-Ahrar and Maulana Anwar Shah Kashmiri later led prayers at this historic mosque, when they visited it.

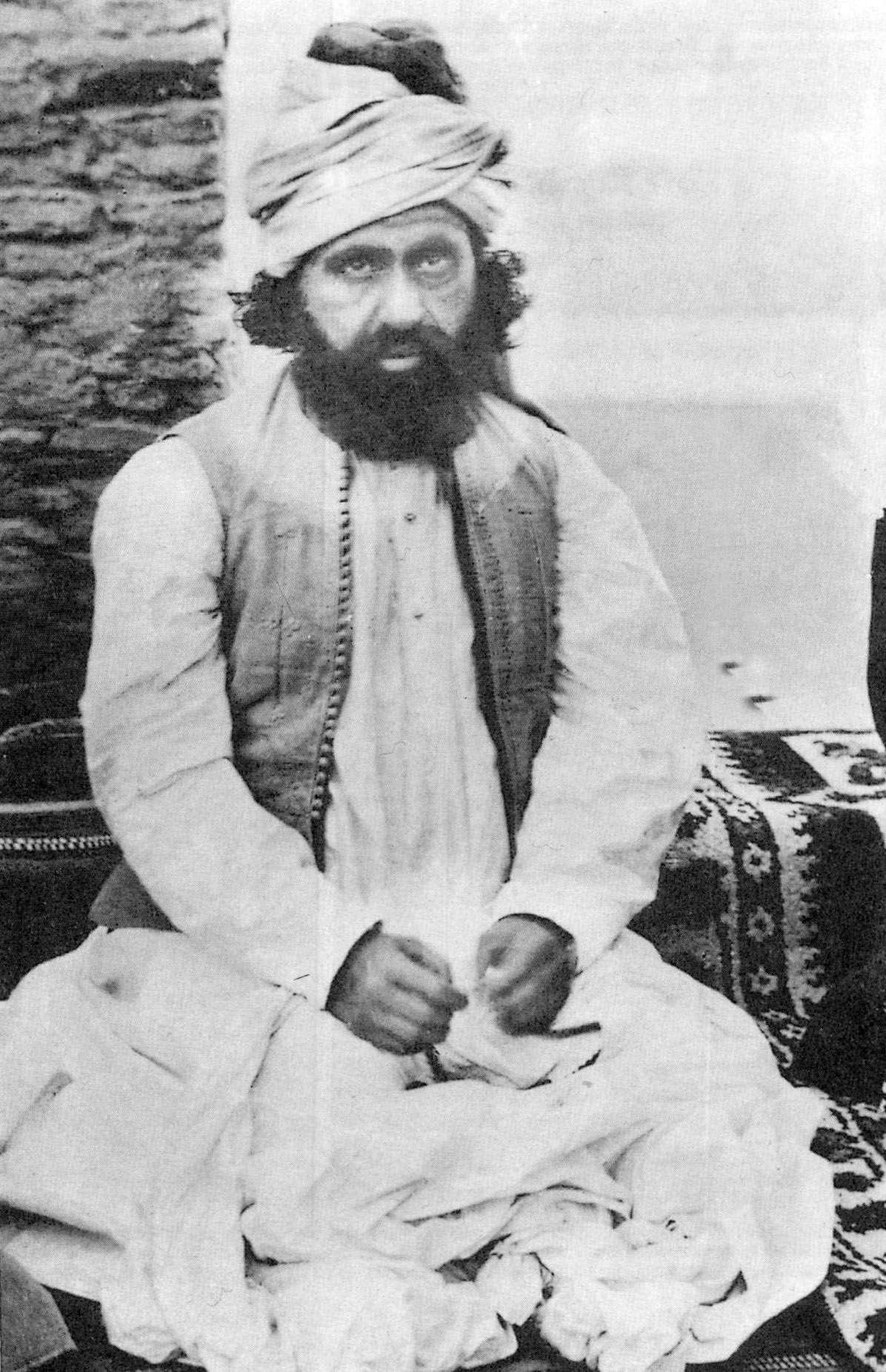
Meher Ali Shah in middle age

== Religious beliefs ==
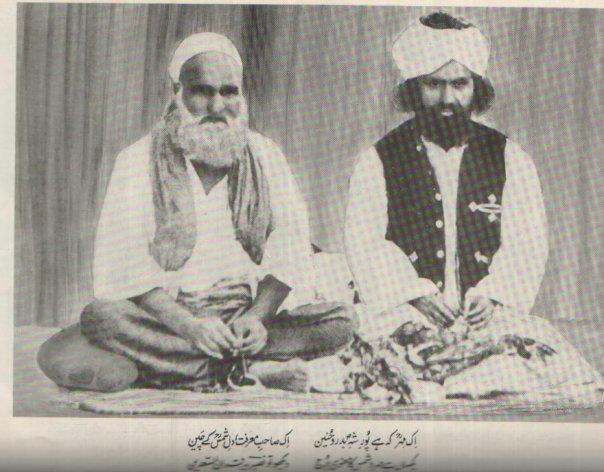
Pir Meher Ali Shah with Khawaja Muhammad din Sialvi of Sial Sharif

=== Sufism ===
Shah was a disciple and Khalifa of Khawaja Shams-ud-din Sialvi of Sial Sharif in the Silsila-e-Chishtia Nizamiyah. His biography Meher-e-Muneer records that he was also made a Khalifa by Haji Imdadullah, when he visited the latter in Mecca.

==== Ibn Arabi ====
Shah was a supporter of Ibn Arabi's ideology of Wahdat-ul-Wujood but he made a distinction between the creation and the creator (as did Ibn Arabi). He also wrote explaining the "Unity of Being" doctrine of Ibn Arabi.

Like his comrade Qazi Mian Muhammad Amjad, he was an authority on Ibn Arabi and his 37-volume work The Meccan Illuminations (Al-Futūḥāt al-Makkiyya).

In 1933, Shah was absorbed in his meditation and mystic trances. That year the philosopher Muhammad Iqbal had to give a lecture at Cambridge University on Ibn Arabi's concept of Space and Time. He wrote a letter to the Shah stating that now there was nobody in all of Hindustan whom he could consult in this matter, and requesting him to tell about Ibn Arabi's work. The Shah however, due to his meditation and bad health, could not reply.

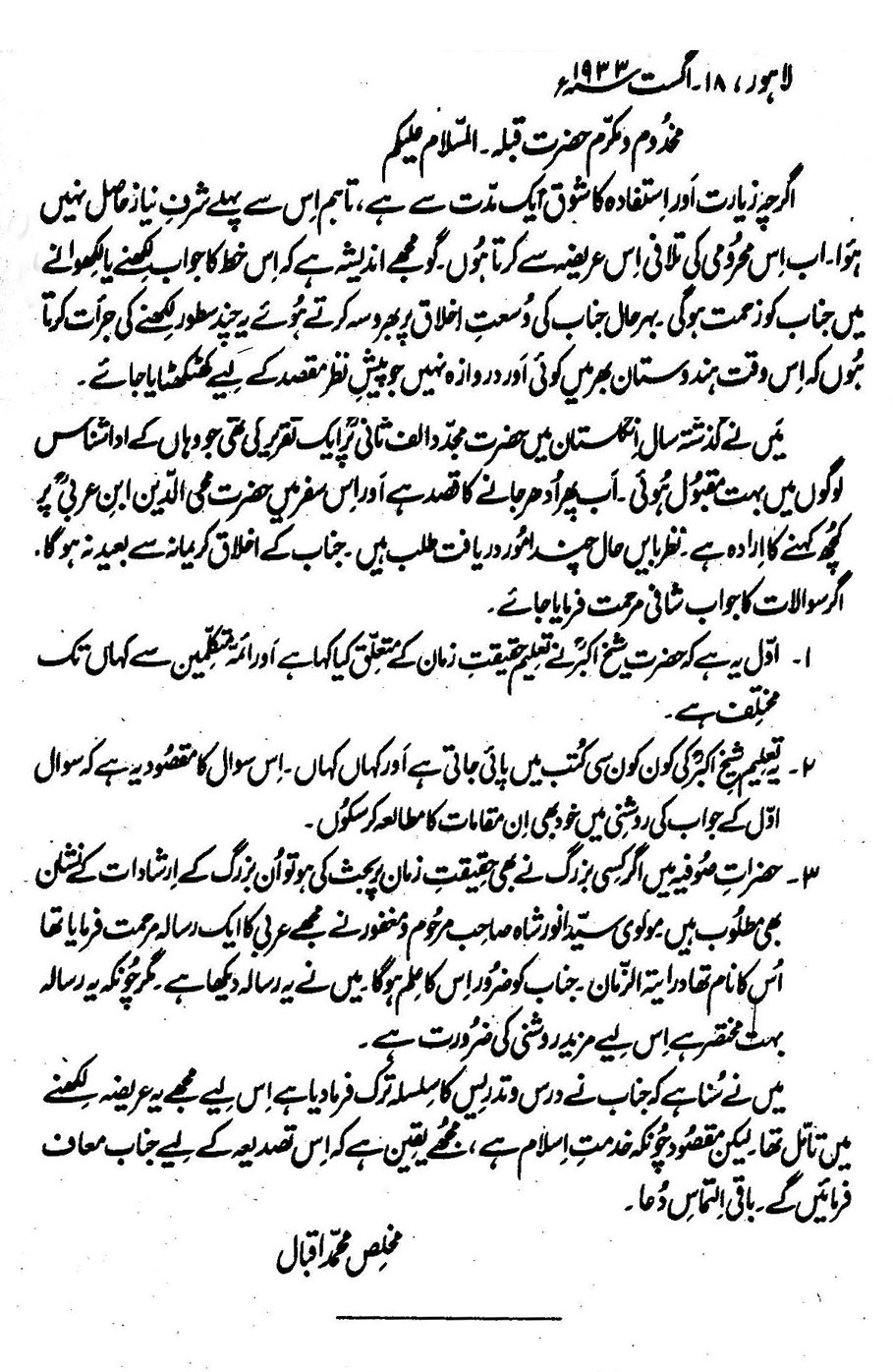
Printed copy of Iqbal's letter.

=== Shi'as ===
Among his lesser-known yet significant works is Tasfiah Mabain Sunni wa Shi'ah ("Clarification Between Sunni and Shia"), a theological treatise composed in Persian. In this work, Shah sought to delineate the doctrinal distinctions between the Sunni and Shia traditions while maintaining a scholarly tone that aimed to reduce sectarian animosity. Though he strongly refuted Shia theological positions—particularly those concerning the Imamate and the early Caliphs—his criticism was framed as part of an intellectual and religious dialogue rather than a hostile polemic.

== Death and legacy ==
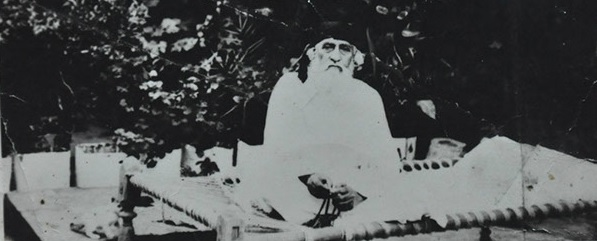
Shah sahib sitting on his charpai with a misbaha in hand

In the early part of the month of Safar 1356-A.H (April 1937), he had an attack of cold, which soon developed into typhoid fever, which lasted for several days. His condition grew worse during the last days of Safar. On the morning of 29 Safar (11 May 1937), the pulse became irregular and the body temperature also underwent sudden changes. Just before the arrival of the final irrevocable moment, he pronounced the words “Allah” from the deepest recesses of his heart in a manner which sent a shudder throughout his body from head to foot, and the reverberation of which was felt by every one who happened to touch the body. The next moment, he repeated the word “Allah” a second time and then turned his head towards the Qibla, thus signaling that the end had finally come.

His three-day Urs (annual death anniversary) is held every year from 27th to 29th Safar. Thousands of devotees come from all over Pakistan to visit the tomb of this early twentieth century Punjabi mystic sufi poet, Pir Meher Ali Shah.

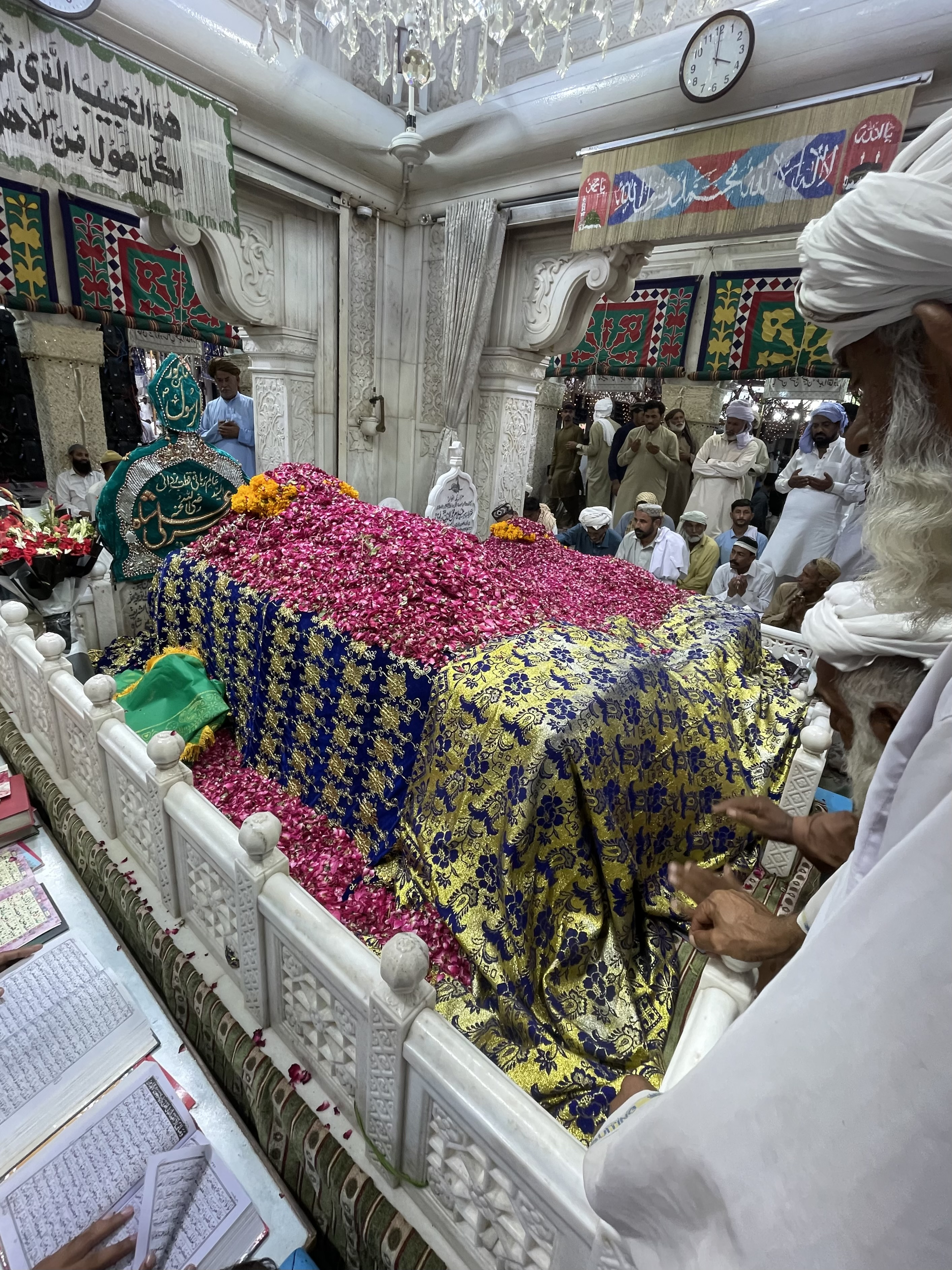
The grave of Pir Meher Ali Shah

== Books ==
The following is a list of notable books authored by Pir Meher Ali Shah:

Urdu Title	English Translation	Description
تحقیق الحق فی کلمۃ الحق	Investigation of Truth in the Word of Truth	A theological treatise originally written in Persian defending the doctrine of Tawḥīd and Wahdat-ul-Wujūd, written in response to contemporary misinterpretations of Islamic creed.
شمس الھدایۃ	Sun of Guidance	A refutation of Mirza Ghulam Ahmad's esoteric interpretations of the Islamic declaration of faith, particularly addressing doctrinal misuses.
سیفِ چشتیائی	The Sword of the Chishtiya	A polemical work answering Ahmadi arguments, especially those in Ijaz-ul-Masih and Shams-e-Bazighah, defending traditional interpretations of Surah al-Fātiḥah and mainstream Sunni creed.
اعلاء کلمات اللہ فی بیان وما أُحلَّ به لغير اللہ	Exalting the Word of Allah and What Was Made Lawful for Others than Allah	A critical analysis of practices like offering sacrifice at shrines and the concept of intercession, aimed at clarifying boundaries of permissible belief in Islam.
الفتوحات الصمدیہ	Divine Bounties	A mystical discourse on divine truths and spiritual experiences, reflecting the author’s deep engagement with Sufism.
تصفیہ مبین سنی و شیعہ	Clarification Between Sunni and Shia	A theological discussion composed in Persian intended to highlight doctrinal differences and commonalities between Sunni and Shia schools of thought.
فتاوی مہریہ	The Mehria Legal Opinions	A compilation of Pir Meher Ali Shah’s Islamic legal rulings covering various aspects of jurisprudence and daily life.
مکلوٰظات مہریہ	Sayings of Mehria	A collection of spiritual aphorisms, advice, and discourses reflecting the author's moral and mystical teachings.

== Honors ==
- Pakistan Post issued a commemorative postage stamp in its Sufi saint series (2013) to pay tribute to him.
- Pir Mehr Ali Shah Arid Agriculture University located at Murree Road Rawalpindi is named after him.

== See also ==
- Naseer-uddin-Naseer
