= Golra Sharif =

Village in Islamabad Capital Territory, Pakistan

Coordinates: 33.6940°N 72.9775°E

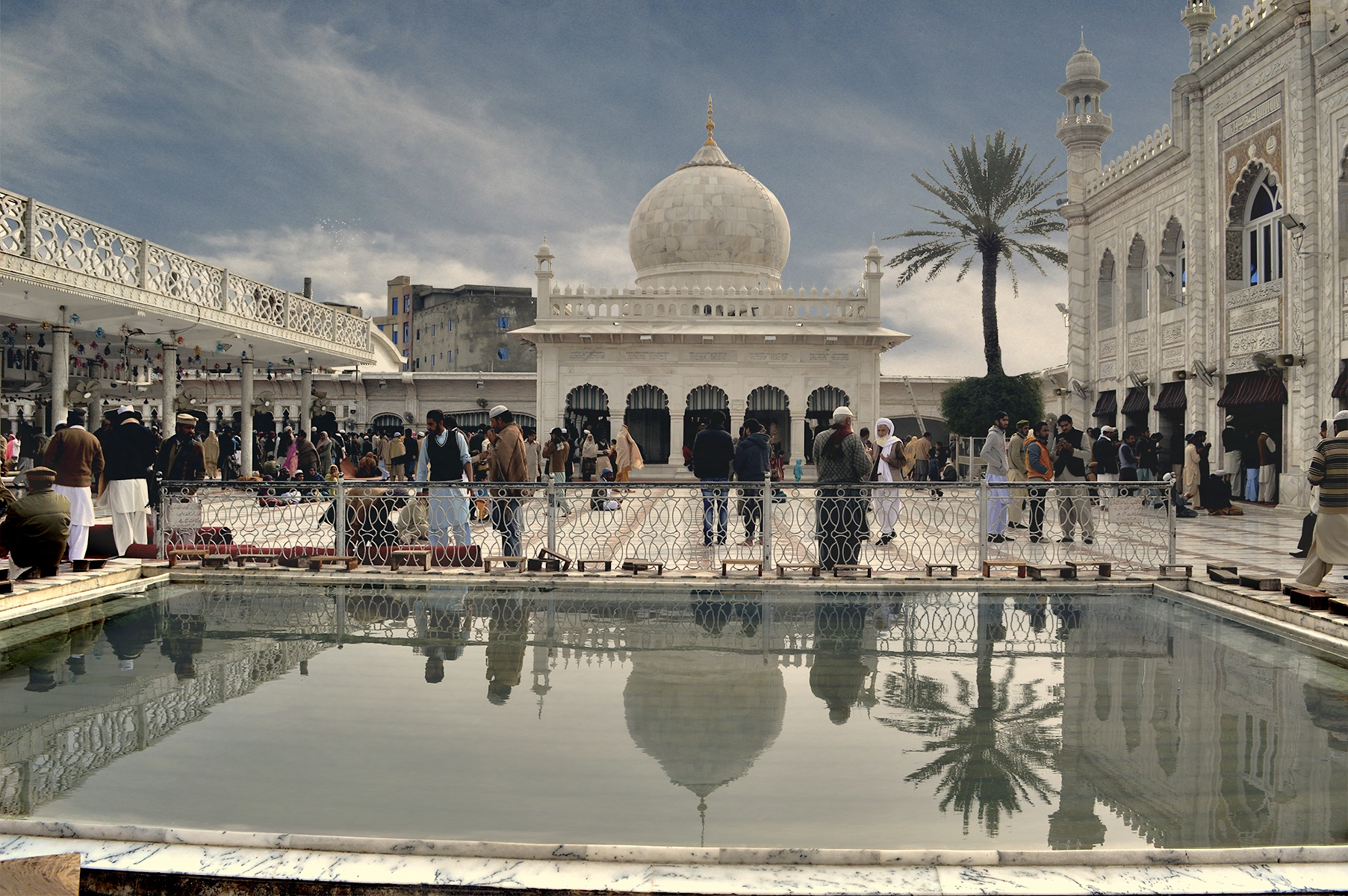
Darbar Golra Shareef

Golra Sharif (Urdu: گولڑہ شریف) is a town situated near the Margalla Hills in Islamabad Capital Territory, Pakistan, at about 520 m (1,710 ft) above sea level, 17 km (11 mi) from the ancient city of Taxila.

It is known for the Mausoleum of Meher Ali Shah that yearly attracts thousands of devotees. Prior to the arrival of Meher Ali Shah's ancestors, Golra Sharif was a village in the suburbs of Rawalpindi.

== Historic railway station ==
The Golra Sharif Junction railway station is situated on Golra Road near Golra Sharif. The station was established in 1881. It is an important junction of Pakistan Railways to link Peshawar, Kohat, Havelian, and Multan. It also hosts the Railways Heritage Museum established in October 2003.
