= Tourism in Islamabad =

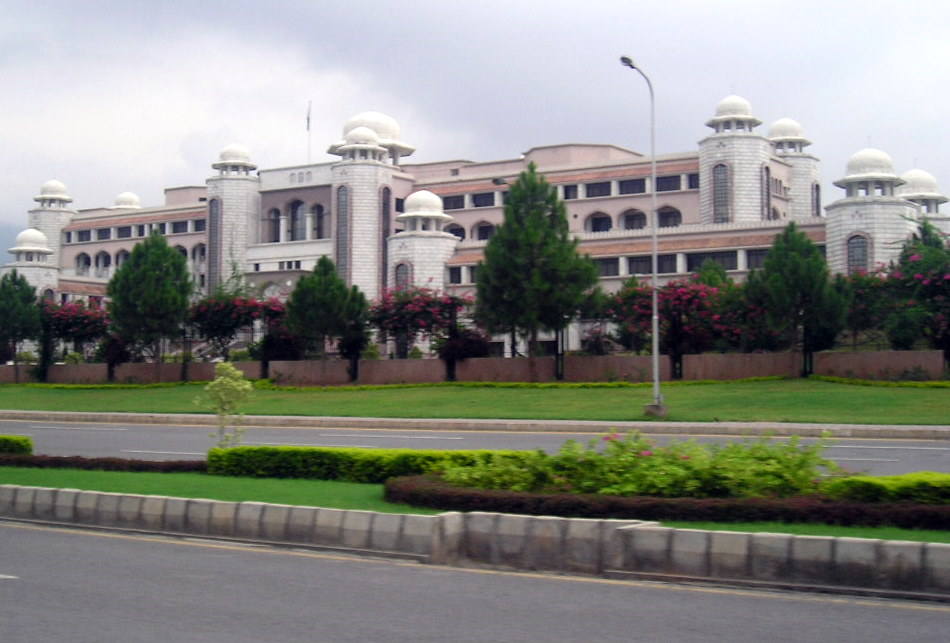
PM house

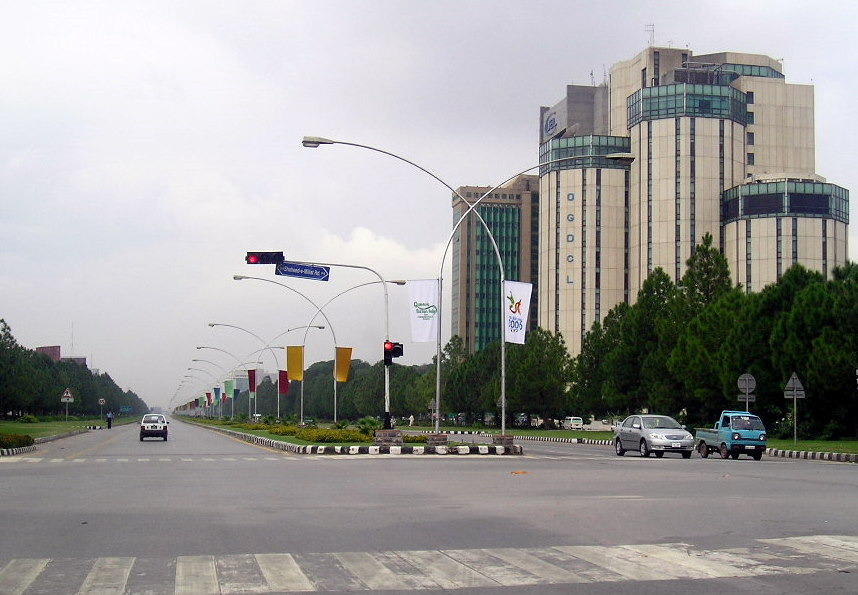
Boulevard, Blue Area, Islamabad,

Islamabad, the capital of Pakistan, is home to numerous tourist attractions. (Note: This article, does not include any attractions in the city of Rawalpindi.) Daman-i-Koh, Margalla Zoo, Pakistan Monument, Faisal Mosque, Shakarparian, Lok Virsa Museum and Rawal lake view point are among the top tourist attractions in Islamabad.

== General ==
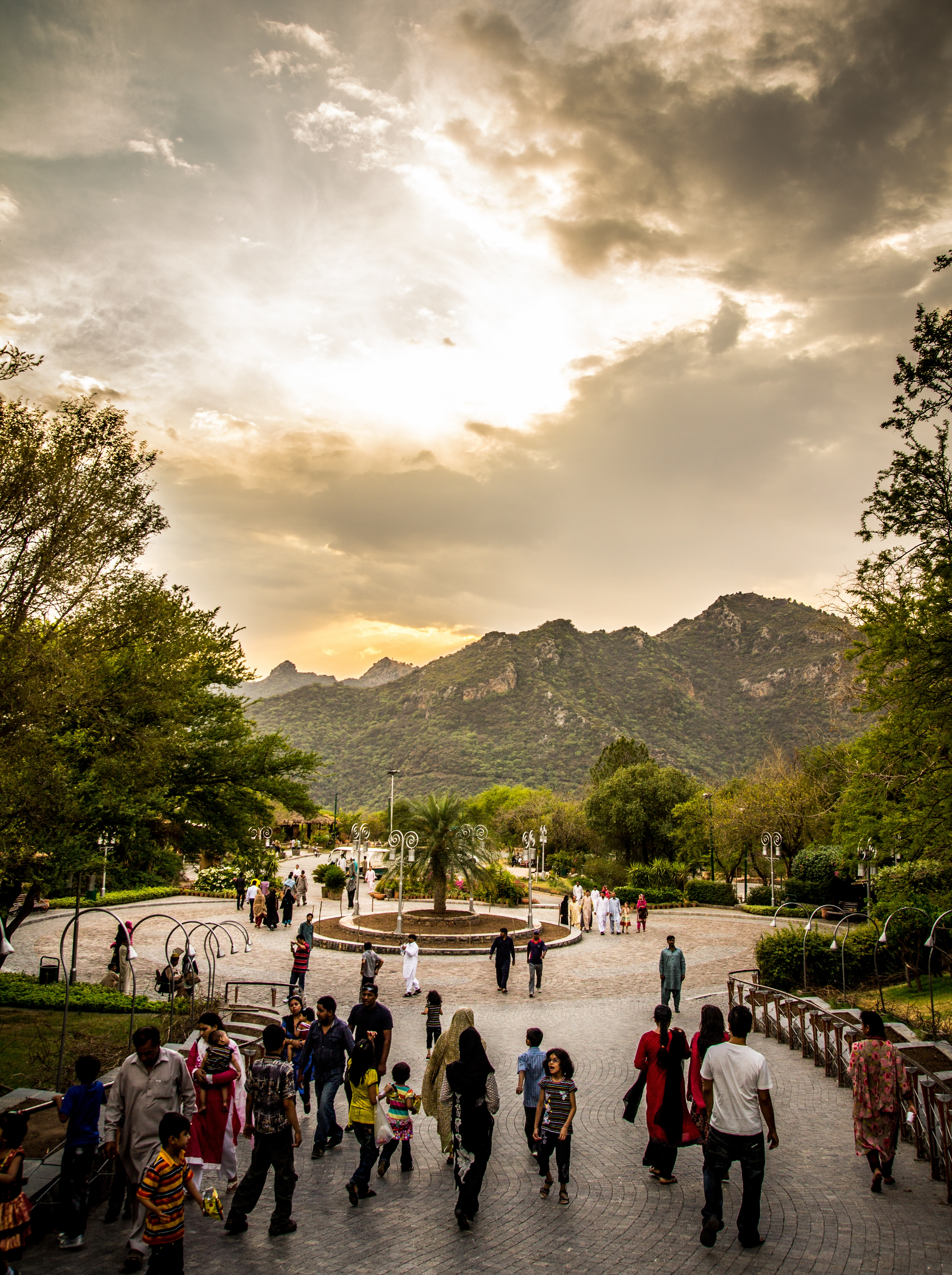
Daman-e-Koh Park

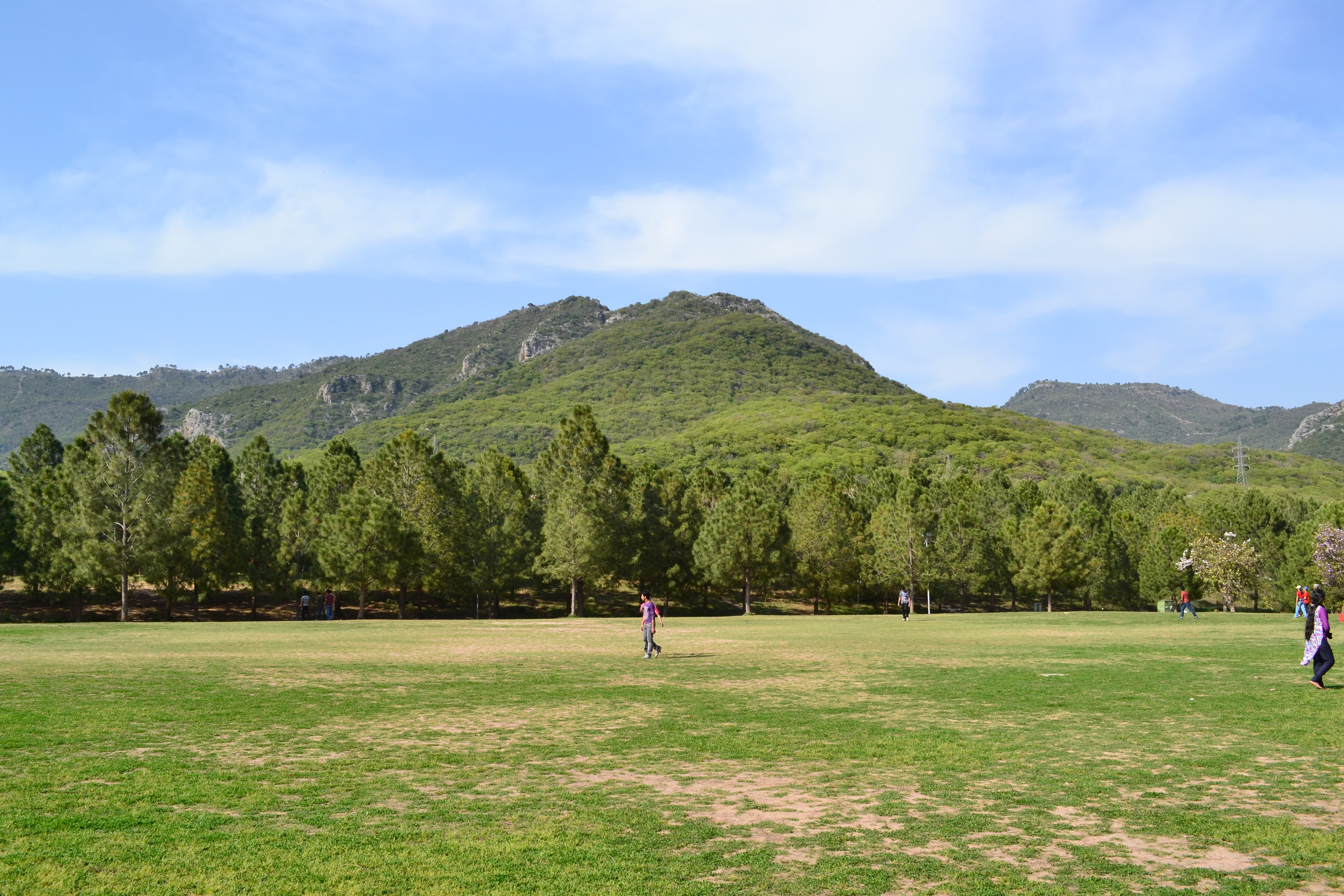
Margalla Hills

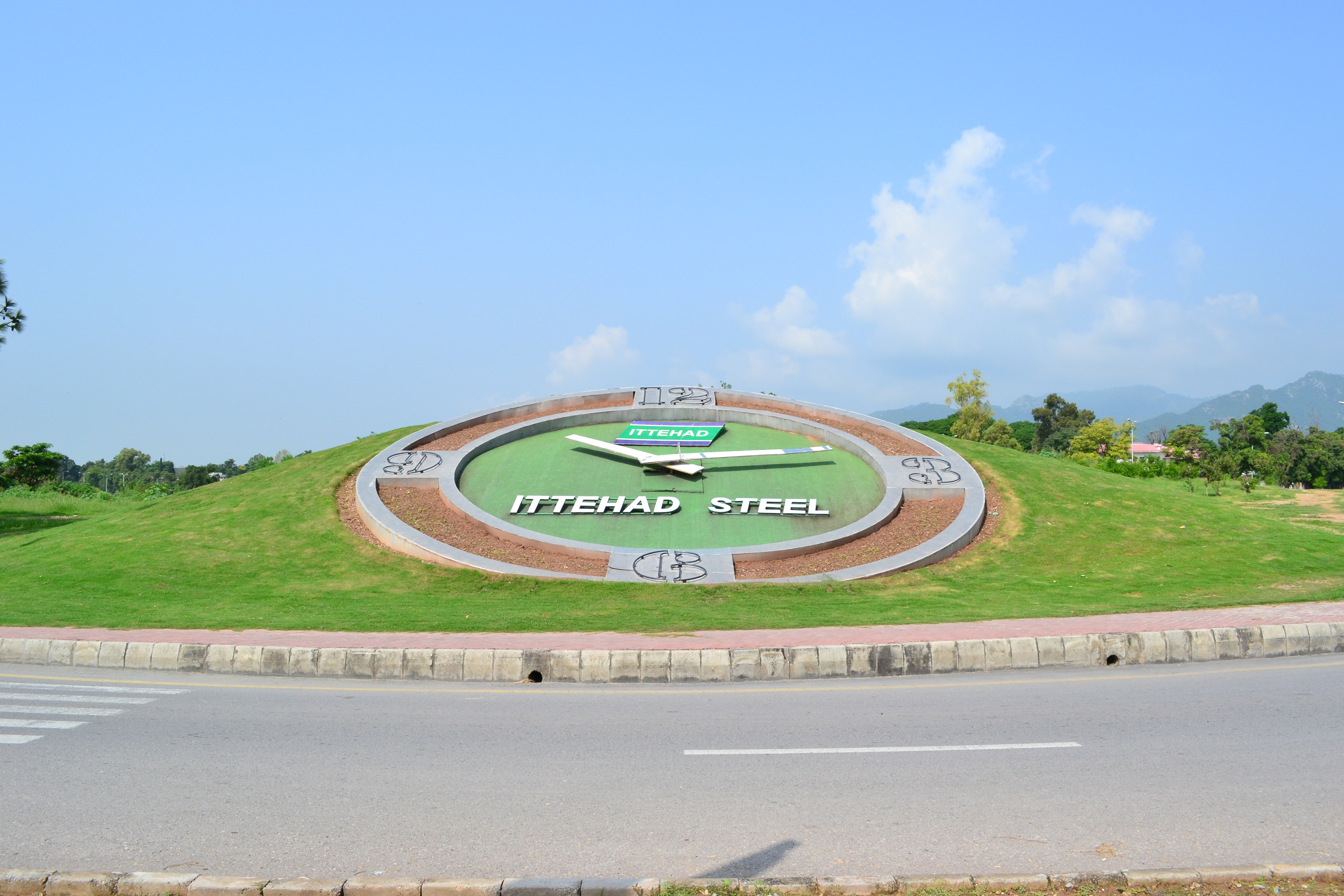
Islamabad Clock

- Faisal Masjid
- The Centaurus
- Daman-e-Koh
- Islamabad Zoo
- Lok Virsa Museum
- Margalla Hills
- Murree Hills
- National Herbarium Islamabad
- National Monument Islamabad
- National Museum of Natural History
- Neela Sandh
- Nilan Bhotu
- Pak-China Friendship Centre
- Pir Sohawa
- Rawal Lake
- Shahdara Village
- Shakarparian
- Lotus Lake
- Shah Allah Ditta

== Rock climbing ==
There are many spots for rock climbing in Margalla Hills, including Jungle Rock (F 6a:8a), God Rock (F 6b+:7b), Legacy Wall (F 6a:7c+), Jasmin Corner (F 4b:5a), Belvedere (F 4c:6b+), Hidden Rock (F 6a:6c), Music Lounge (F 5c:6c) Beetle’s Nest (F 5b:6c+, including multi-pitch route), Well Hidden Rock (F 5a:8a), Holiday Rock (F 5b:5b), Said Pur View (F 5c:8a) and Shaddarrah (F 5c:6a).

== Parks ==
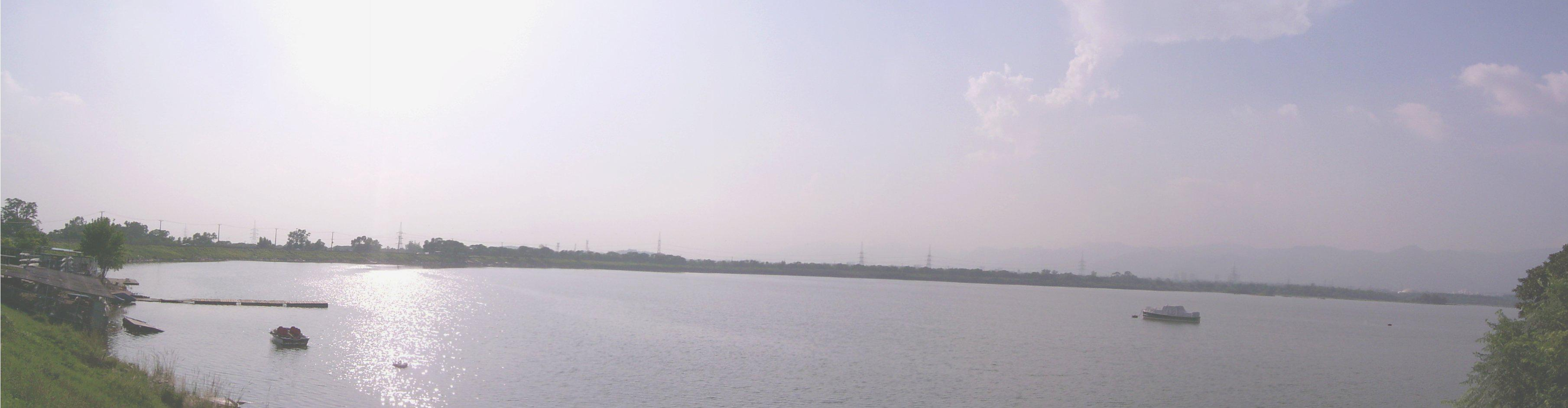
Rawal lake view

- Ayub National Park
- Ankara Park
- Fatima Jinnah Park
- Japanese Park
- Lake View Park
- Playland
- Rose & Jasmine Garden

== Museums and art galleries ==
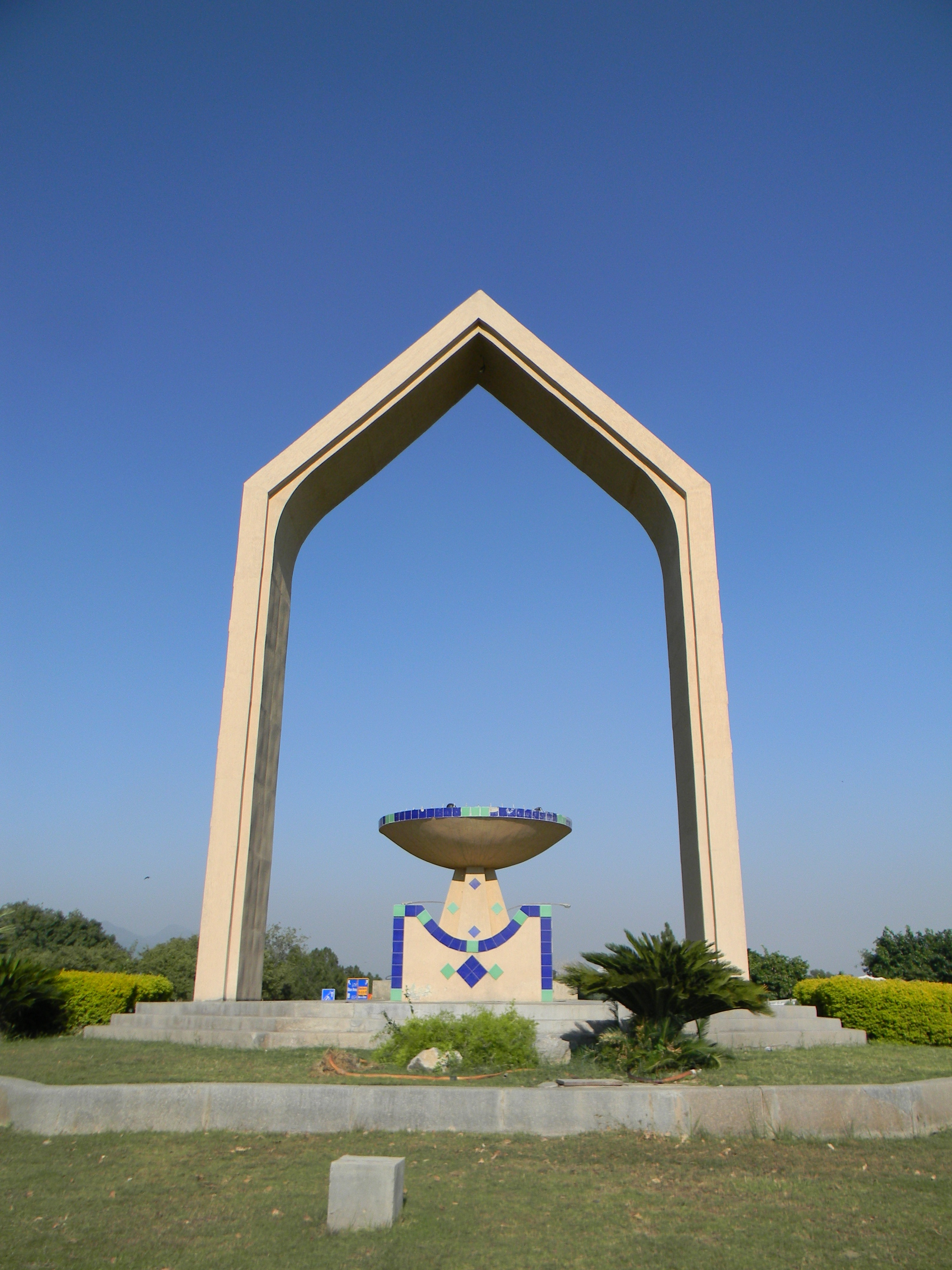
Islamabad di Daat

- Lok Virsa Museum
- Golra Sharif Railway Museum
- National Art Gallery, Islamabad
- Pakistan Museum of Natural History

== Model villages ==
- Potohari Arts & Craft Village
- Saidpur Village Resort

== Mosques and shrines ==
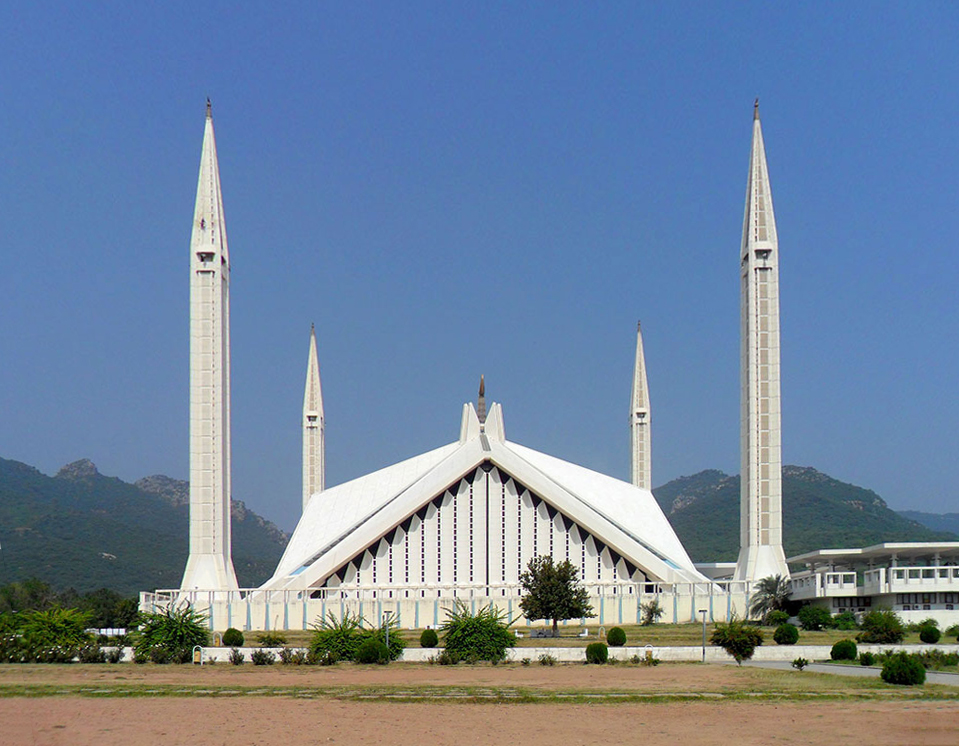
A right view of Shah Faisal Mosque from adjoining yard

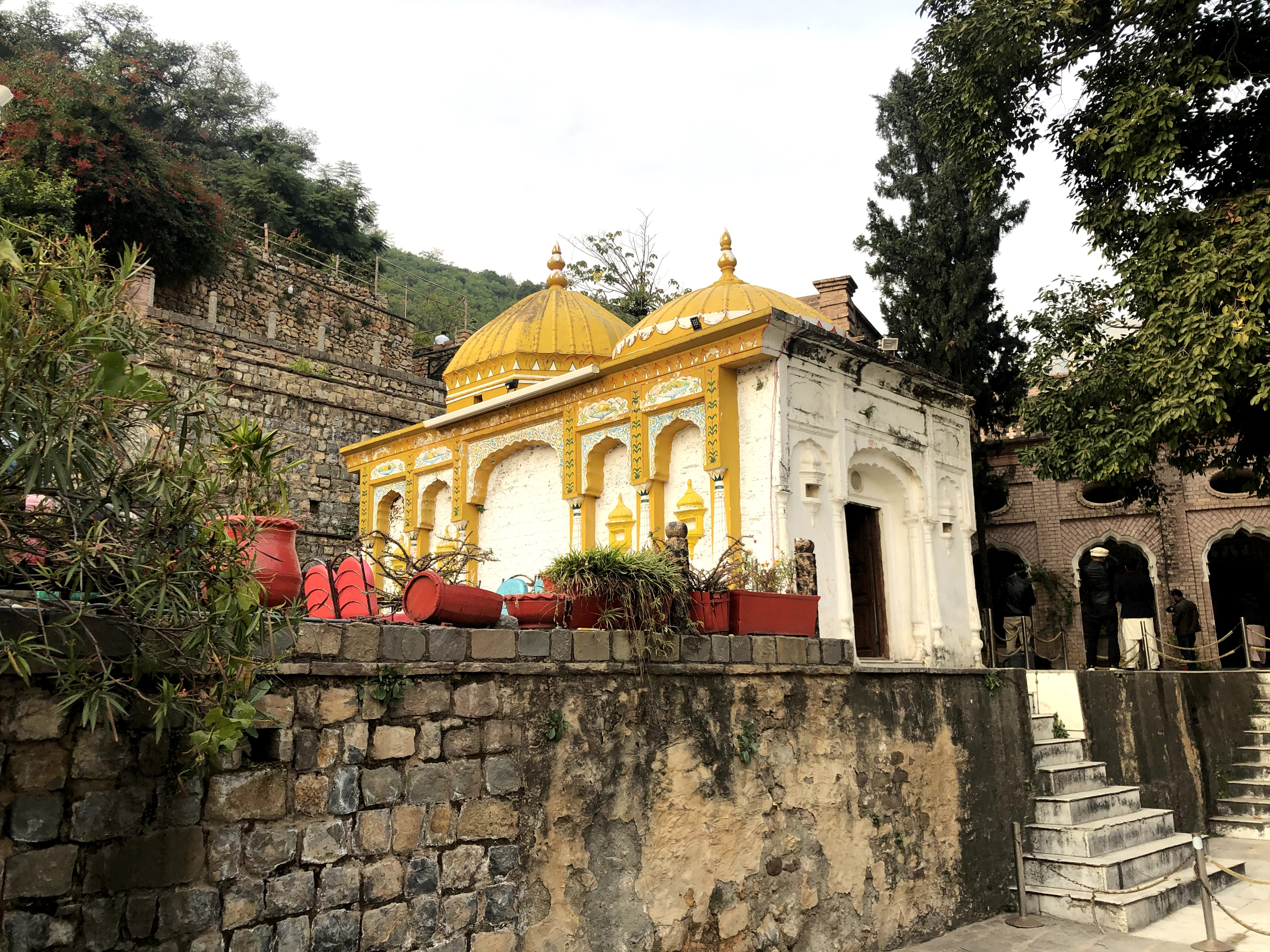
Ram Mandir in Saidpur- historic Hindu temple

- Baba Badshah Bani Gala
- Bari Imaam
- Shah Faisal Mosque
- Golra Sharif
- Ram Mandir, Saidpur

== Food streets ==
- Melody Food Street
- Aabpara Food Street
- Blue Area Food Street
- Naan Street in PWD Islamabad

== Sporting facilities ==
- Jinnah Sports Stadium
- Liaquat Gymnasium

== Main markets ==
=== Markaz and bazaars ===
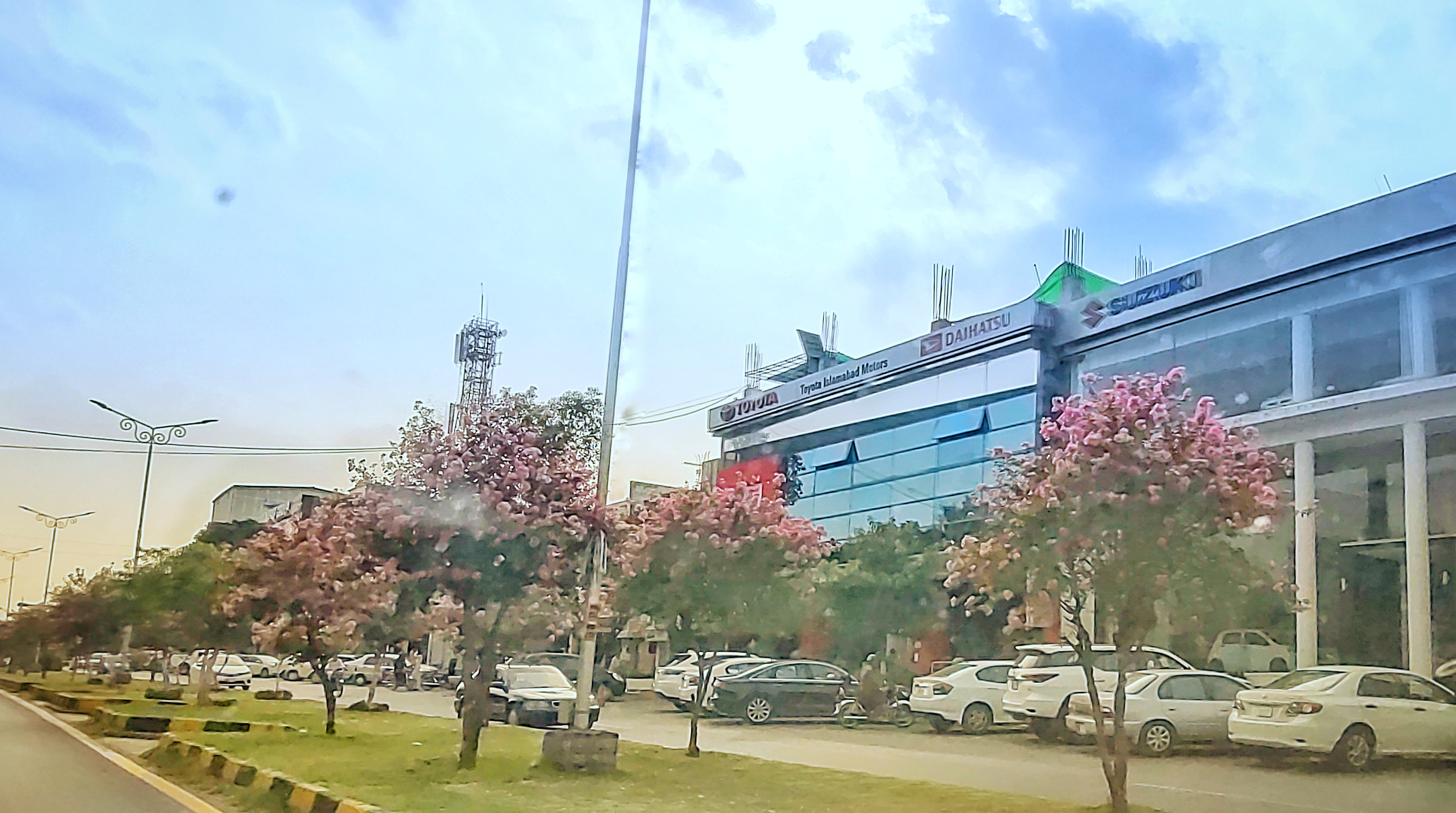
Aabpara Market at G-6 is the oldest market of Islamabad

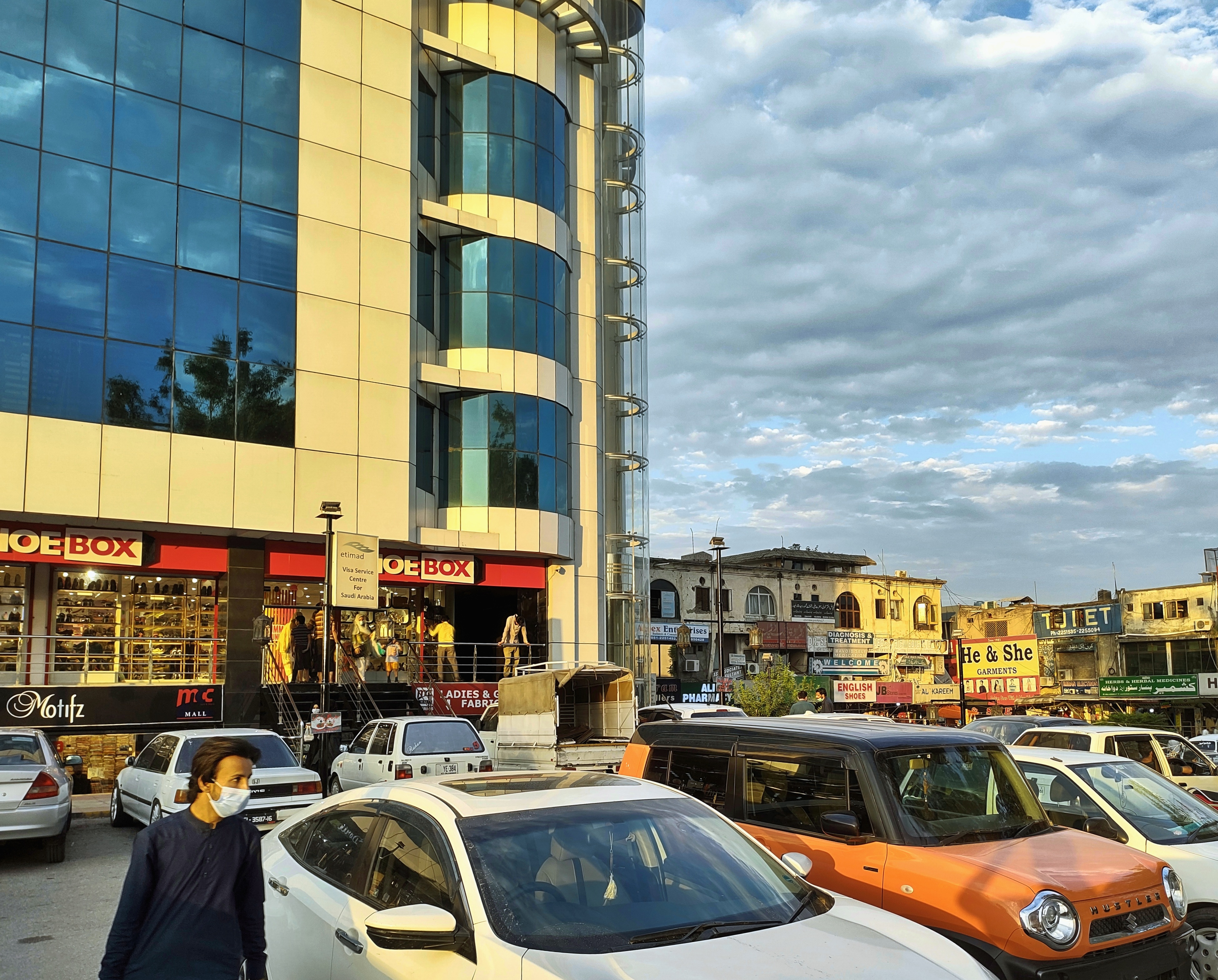
G-9 Markaz or Karachi Company

Every populated sector in Islamabad has a main market/bazaar referred to as a markaz.

- Aabpara Market (G-6)
- Allah Wali Market (F-8/1)
- Ayyub Market/F-8 Markaz
- Cafe Irum Market (G-6/2)
- Jinnah Super Market/F-7 Markaz
- Friday and Sunday Bazar (near Peshawar Morr Interchange and G-6)
- Karachi Company/G-9 Markaz
- Mediterranean Food Court Diplomatic Enclave/G-5 Markaz
- Super Market/F-6 Markaz

=== Malls ===
- Centaurus Mall
- Emporium Mall (under construction)
- Giga Mall
- Olympus Mall
- Pak China Mall
- Safa Gold Mall
- Gulberg Mall
- Zeta 1 Mall (under construction)

== Government buildings ==
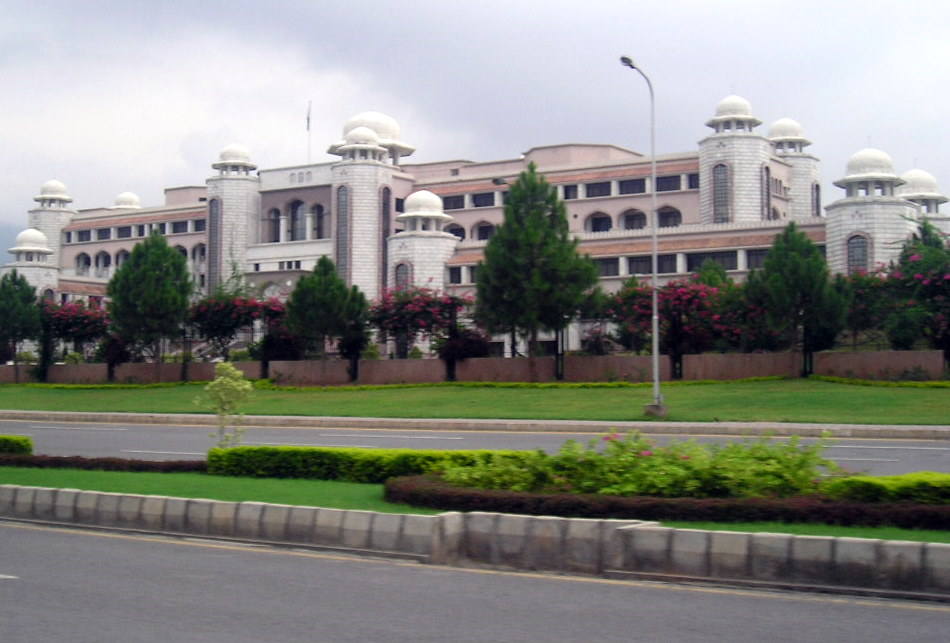
Prime Minister Secretariat

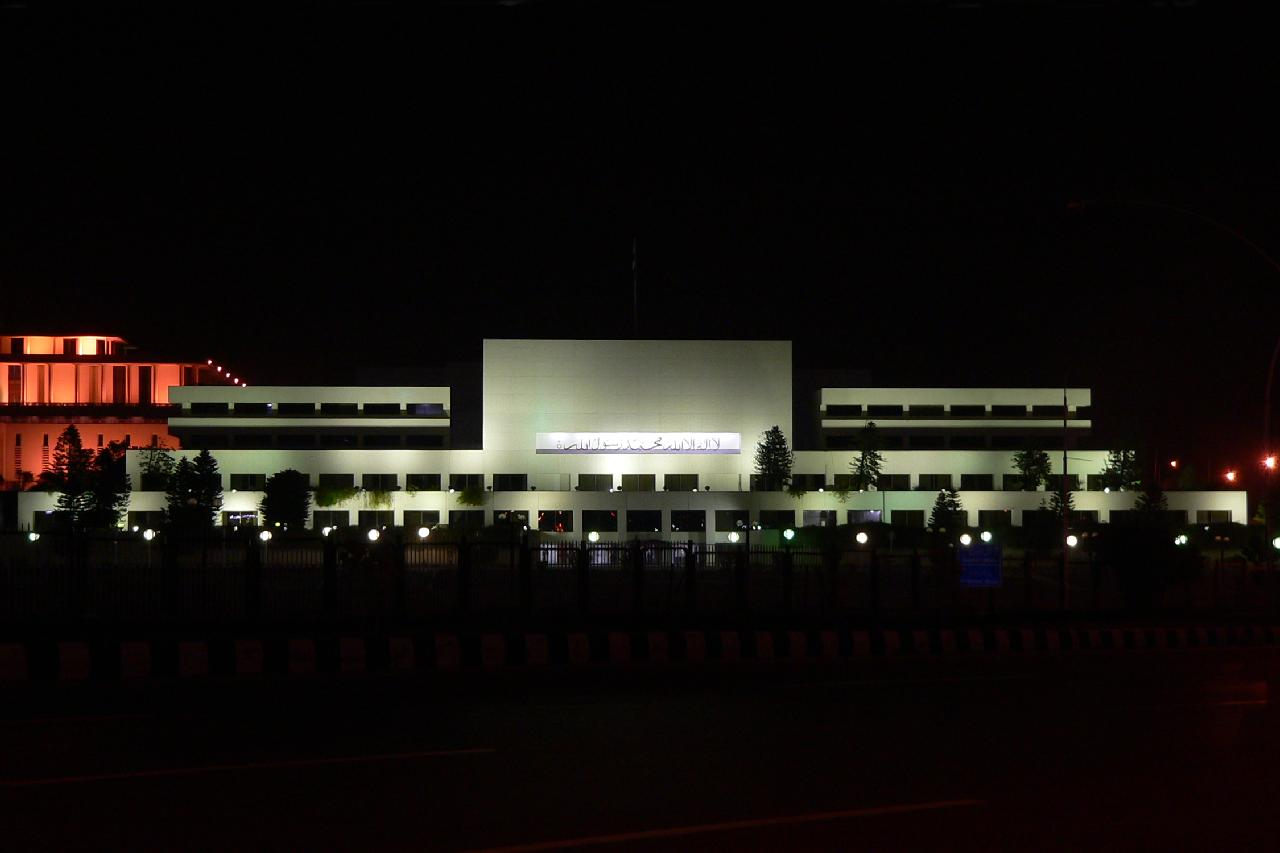
Parliament House

- Aiwan-e-Sadr - President's official residence
- National Institute of Health
- National Parliament of Pakistan
- Supreme Court of Pakistan

== See also ==
- Developments in Islamabad
