= Al Ma'wa Wildlife Reserve =

The Al Ma'wa Wildlife Reserve in Jerash province, 48 kilometres north of Amman, was established in 2011 by the Princess Alia Foundation in partnership with the international animal welfare organisation Four Paws. It is the largest sanctuary for rescued and mistreated wildlife in the Middle East. Covering 140 hectares donated by the Jordanian Agriculture Ministry, it includes habitats for large cats and bears. In December 2020, Four Paws transferred two Himalayan brown bears from the closing Islamabad Zoo.
