= Islamabad Zoo =

Zoo in Pakistan

Islamabad Zoo اسلام آباد چڑیا گھر
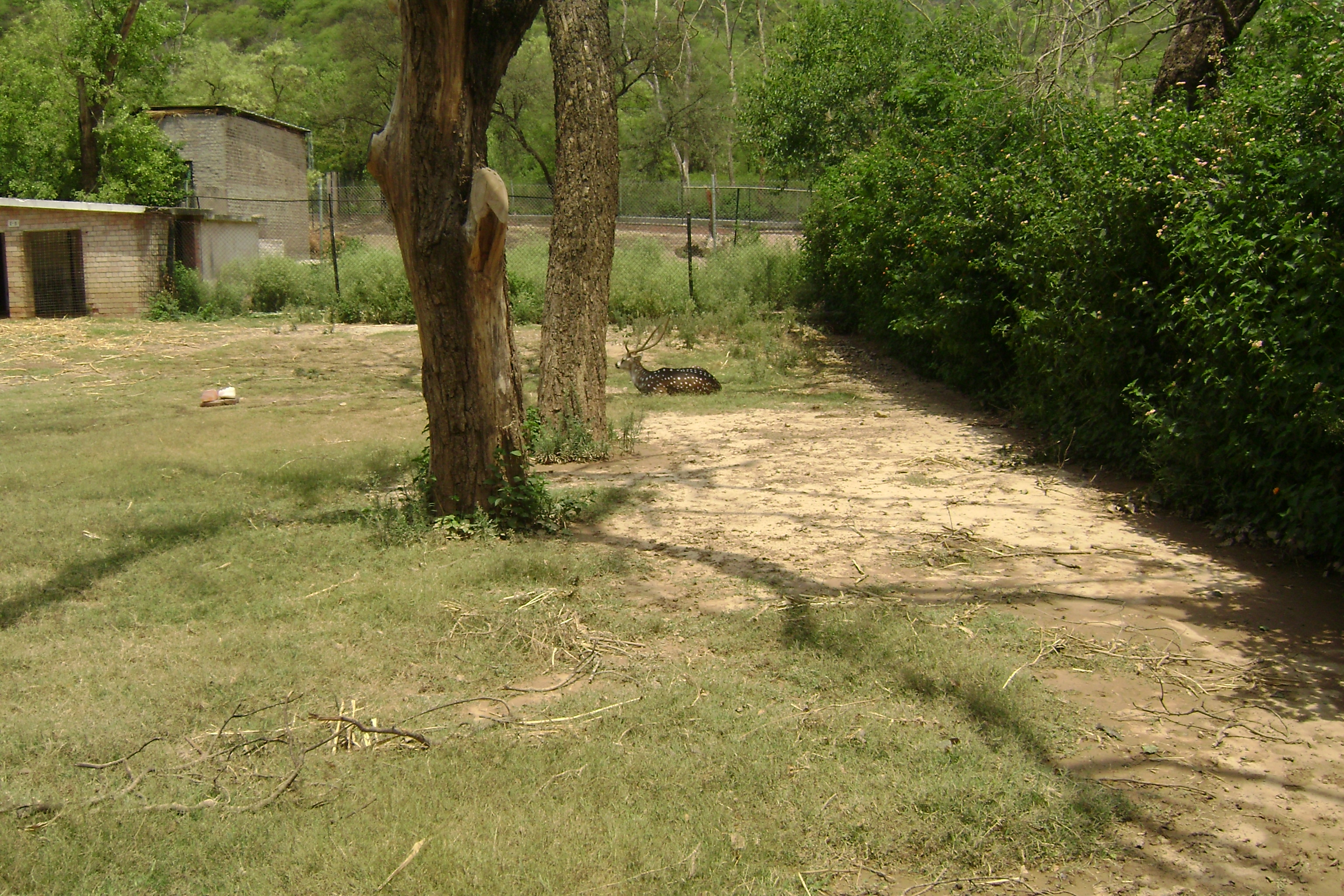
- A view of Islamabad Zoo
- Interactive map of Islamabad Zoo اسلام آباد چڑیا گھر
- 33°44′3.47″N 73°3′32.81″E
- Date opened: 1978
- Date closed: December 2020
- Location: Pir Sohawa Road, Islamabad, Pakistan
- Land area: 33-hectare (82-acre)
- No. of animals: ~600
- Annual visitors: ~1 million

Islamabad Zoo (Urdu: اسلام آباد چڑیا گھر), previously Marghazar Zoo, was a 33-hectare (82-acre) zoo in Islamabad Capital Territory. It was opened in 1978, and was under the administration of Capital Development Authority of Pakistan before its closure in December 2020 due to its mistreatment of animals.

In May 2020, the Islamabad High Court ruled to transfer management of the park and its non-human species to the Islamabad Wildlife Management Board and transfer all animals to shelters, and the board took administrative control in June 2021. A renovation of the zoo as a conservation centre is being planned and subsequently, the zoo being shut down temporarily.

== History ==
The zoo started in 1978 as a refuge for leopards, spotted deer, and Indian gazelle found in the region, and was administered by Capital Development Authority. Located at the foot of Margalla Hills, it soon gained popularity and became a part of the Japanese garden. An aviary was later constructed. The Capital Development Authority devised a plan in August 2008 to upgrade and extend the zoo as a recreational area and wildlife sanctuary. The estimated cost of the project was 1407.8 million Pakistani rupees.

In February 2019, Minister of State for Climate Change Zartaj Gul told a Senate committee that she has requested the government to hand over the control to the Islamabad Wildlife Management Board for better management of the zoo and care of the animals. Gul said, “The zoo needs to be returned from the MCI to the Islamabad Wildlife Management Board that has qualified individuals and trained caretakers.”

In May 2020, the closure of the zoo was ordered by the court.

== Controversies ==
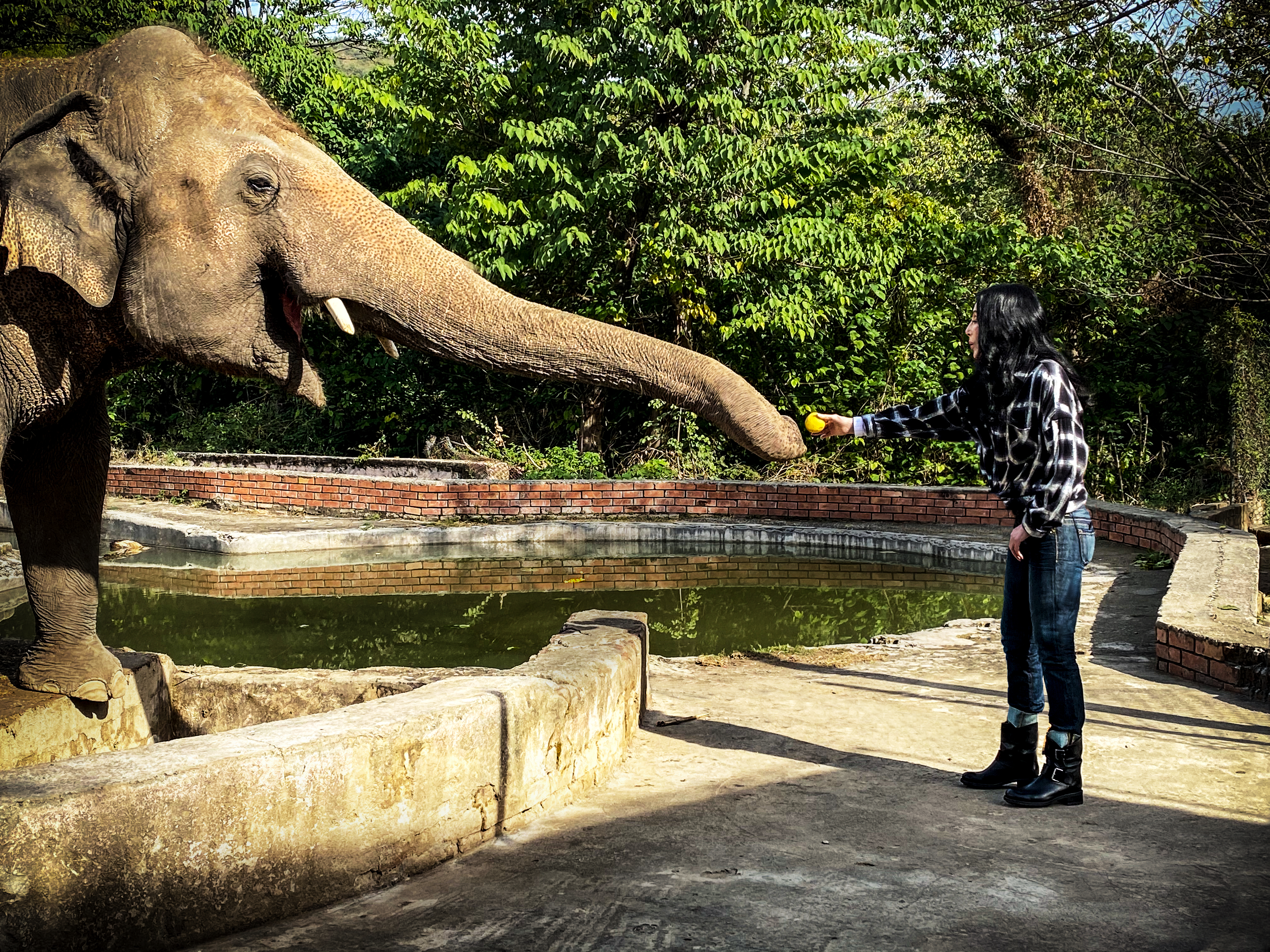
Kaavan taking a fruit from Cher

In September 2016, the 32 year-old Asian elephant named Kaavan, turned mentally ill due to being chain bound for the last two decades. The neglect spawned international attention, and there was a #SaveKavaan hashtag on social media. The zoo consequently decided to send Kavaan to his homeland of Cambodia. In July 2017, four lion cubs died due to keepers giving them high intakes of Welmingnch milk instead of a lioness' milk. Later in 2017, a male ostrich died due to negligence of the zoo staff. In August 2018, six deer were mauled by a wolf at an extension of the zoo. The zoo was also criticised for the insufficient or bad quality of food, the small cages they are put in, and their poor health.

On 21 May 2020, the Islamabad High Court ordered that the elephant Kaavan should be immediately relocated to a different sanctuary following a four-year campaign by popular pop singer Cher since 2016 demanding for the release of Kaavan from Islamabad Zoo. On December 1, 2020, Kaavan arrived at a wildlife sanctuary in Cambodia.

== Renovation ==
In 2021, the climate change ministry of Pakistan began planning a $7.5 million rehabilitation of the zoo. All animals were temporarily relocated to sanctuaries. The ministry intends to establish the zoo as a conservation centre, with facilities to treat and rehabilitate injured wildlife. The Islamabad Wildlife Management Board took administrative control of the zoo on 24 June 2021.

Some of the animals that were housed at Islamabad Zoo

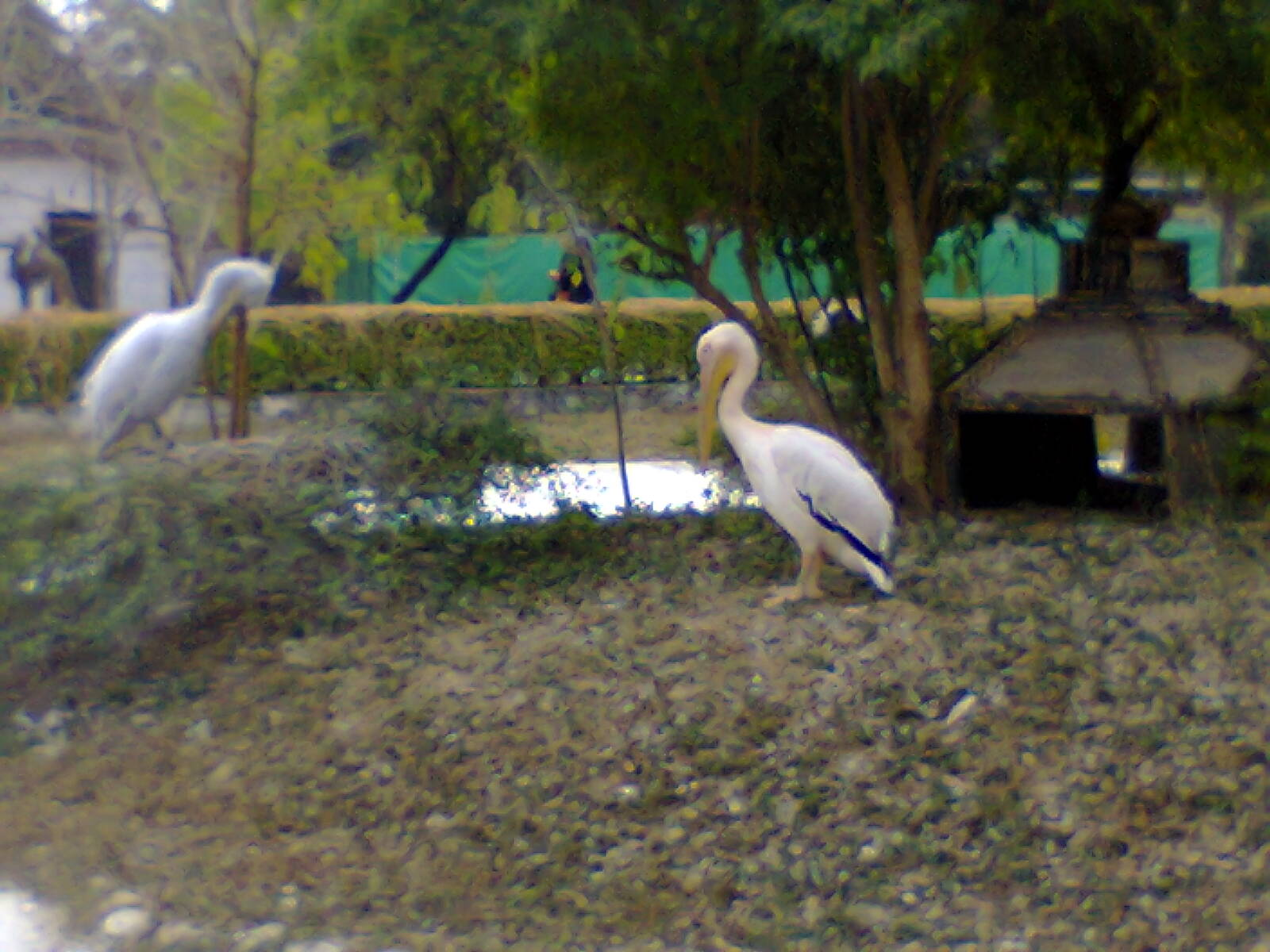

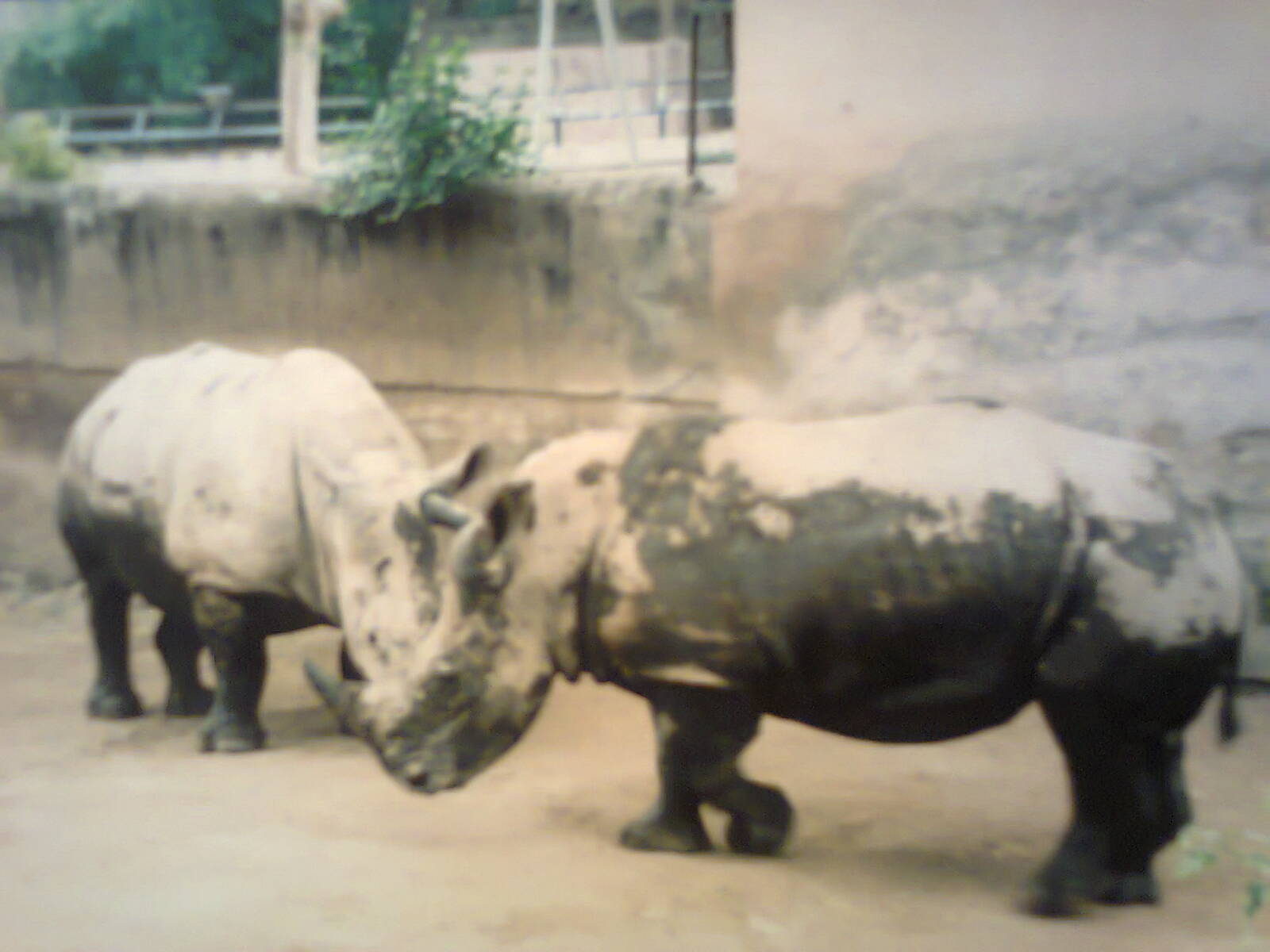

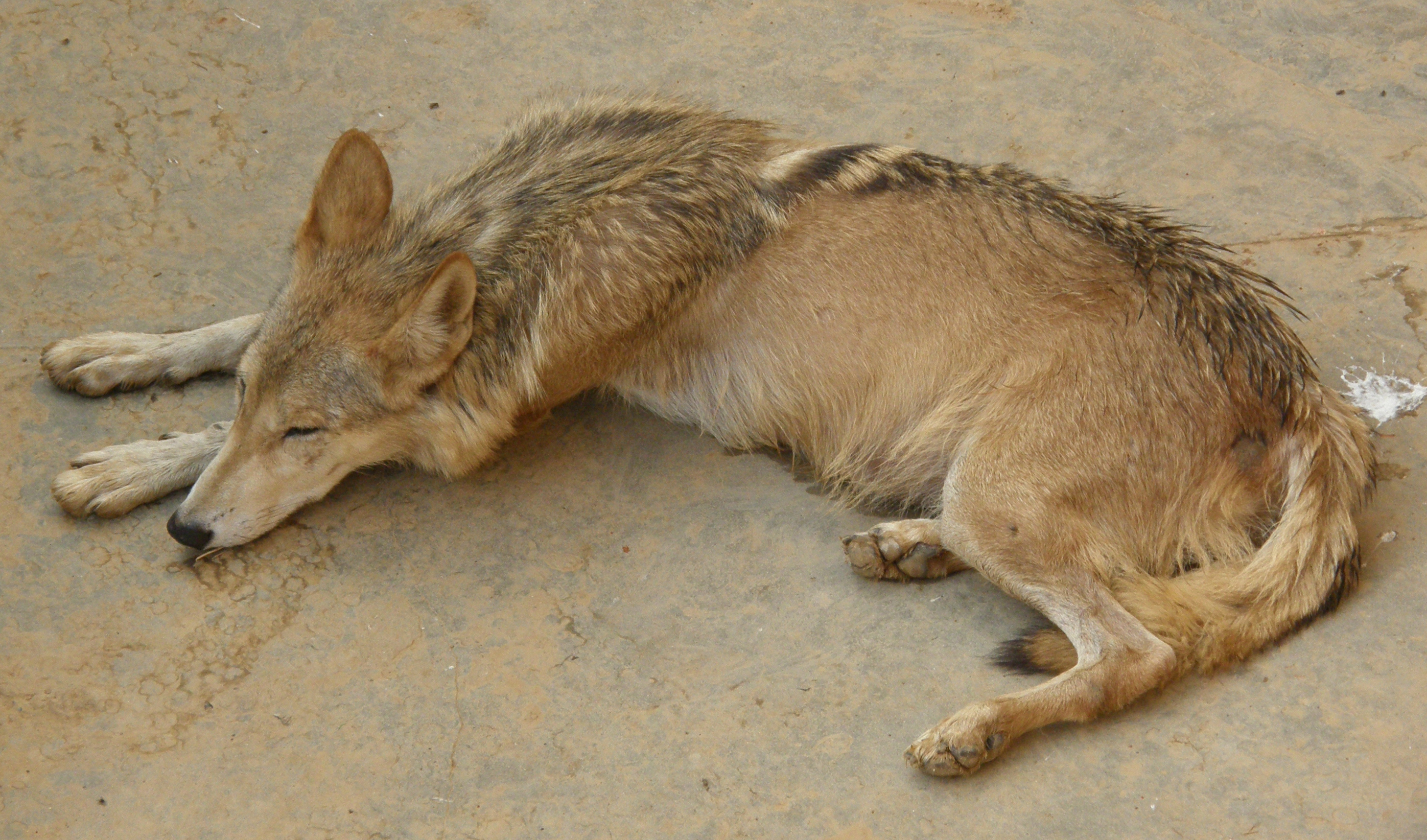

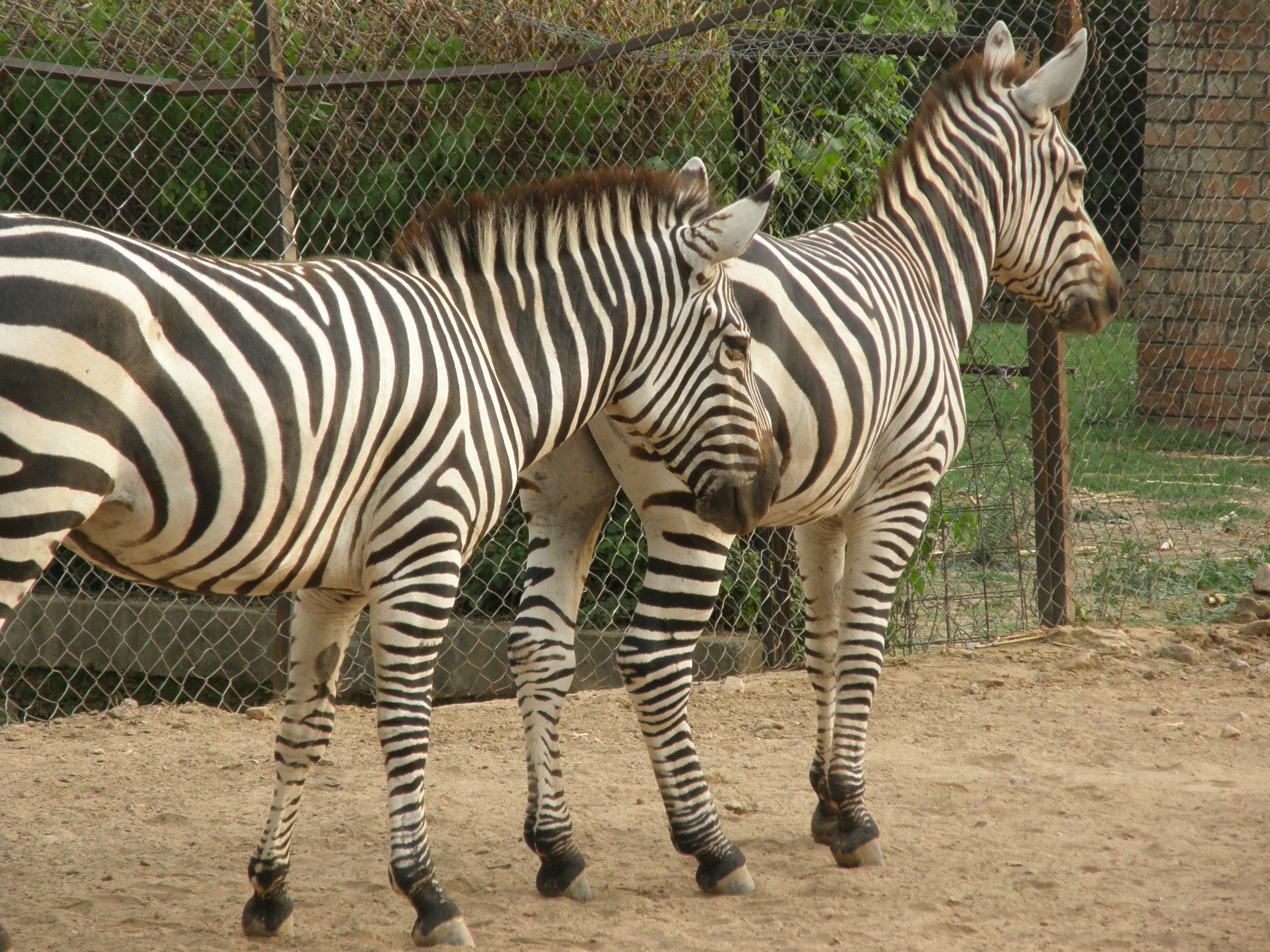

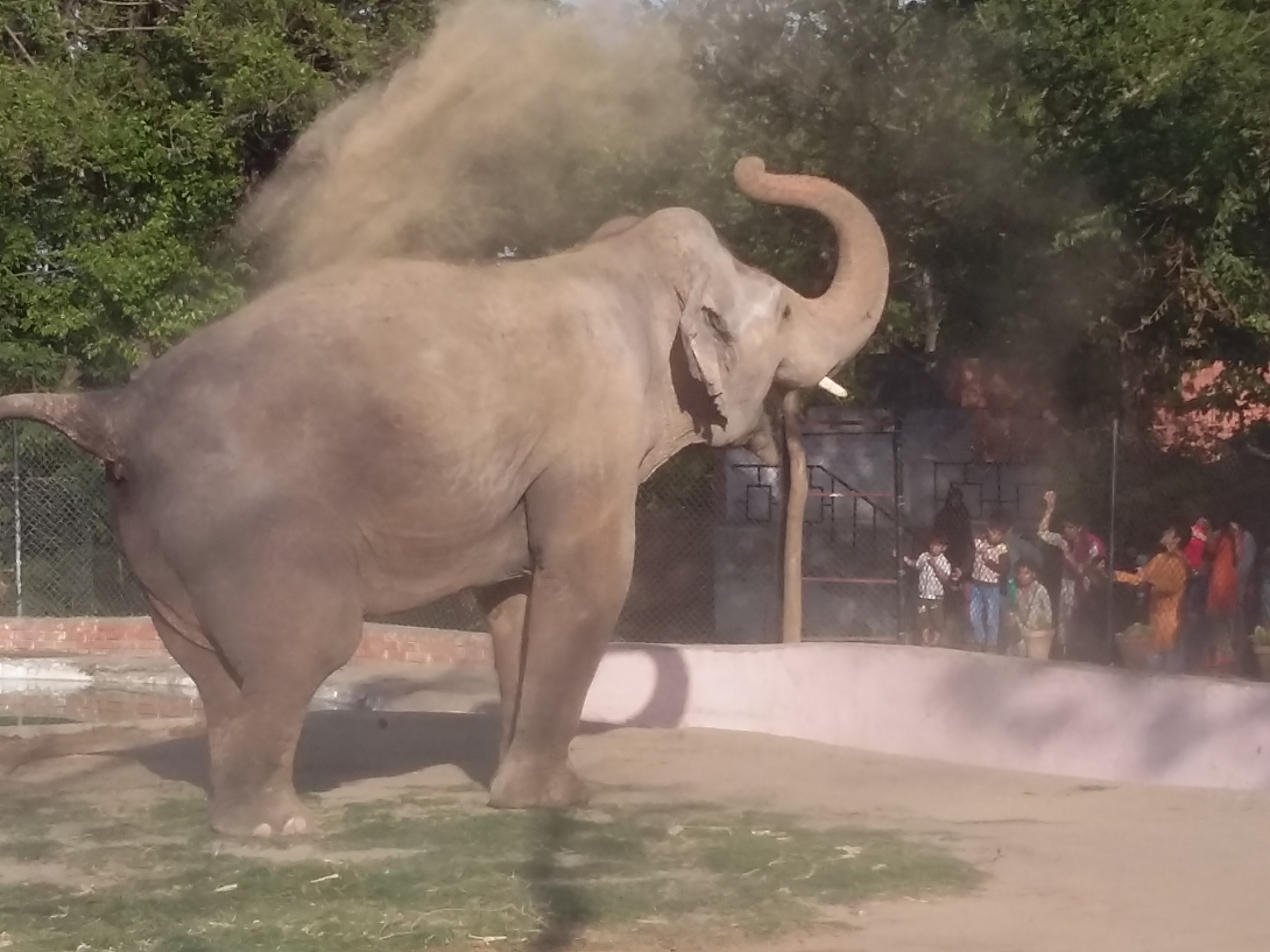

== See also ==
- List of zoos in Pakistan
- Capital Development Authority
- Margalla hills
- Daman-e-Koh
- Pir Sohawa
