= Nilan Bhotu =

Coordinates: 33°50′N 73°11′E

Nilan Bhotu Valley is about 40 minutes drive from Pir Sohawa on the Khyber Pakhtunkhwa (KPK) side of Margalla Hills, roughly 27 kilometres (17 mi) North-East of Islamabad, the capital city of Pakistan. The 'Chilla Gah' (Place of meditation) of Bari Imam is also located there with crystal clear water ponds full of Mahseer fish, but fishing is not allowed by the locals.

It is almost possible to go there on a street car, you can also use motor bikes (Trail bike preferably). It also passes through a stream. You can also hire a jeep from the village to take you to Nilan bhotu.
