= Daman-e-Koh =

Hilltop garden near Islamabad, Pakistan

- دامن کوہ
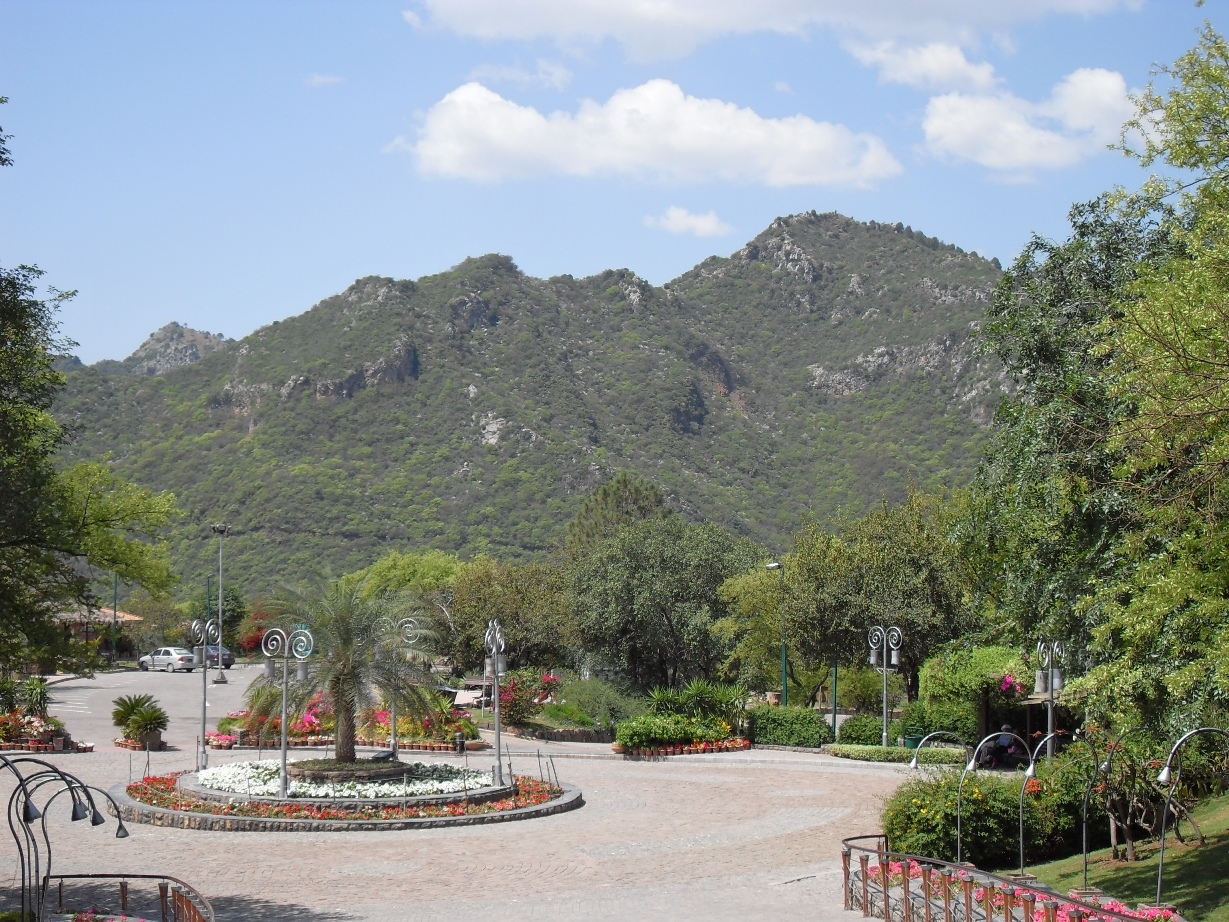
- A morning view at Daman-e-Koh

- Location within Islamabad Capital Territory
- Type: Public
- Location: Pir Sohawa Road, Islamabad
- Nearest city: Islamabad
- Coordinates: 33.7395548°N 73.0554566°E
- Elevation: 731 m (2,398 ft)
- Administrator: Capital Development Authority
- Hiking trails: Trail 2

Daman-e-Koh (Urdu: دامن کوہ) is a hilltop garden north of Islamabad. It is in the center of the Margalla Hills. The name is a fusion of two Persian words "Dāman" (دامن) meaning "skirt" and "Kōh" (کوہ) meaning "hill", which collectively denote "foothills". It is about 731 m (2,398 ft) above sea level and about 152 m (499 ft) above Islamabad. The area is a popular destination for both residents and tourists.

Tourist treats are a popular attraction for monkeys. Leopards are reported to descend from higher hills of Murree during the winter months.

Airblue Flight 202 crashed near here on 28 July 2010.

== Access ==
Daman-e-Koh is located on the route to Pir Sohawa, which is approximately 1,097 m (3,599 ft) above sea level. Since the road is slender and winding, it is cited as a reason for traffic jams for the lack of public transportation alternatives. Environmental concerns led to the suspension of the chairlift from Daman-e-Koh to Pir Sohawa.

From Trail 2, it is possible to access the viewpoint by hiking.

== Panoramic view of Islamabad ==
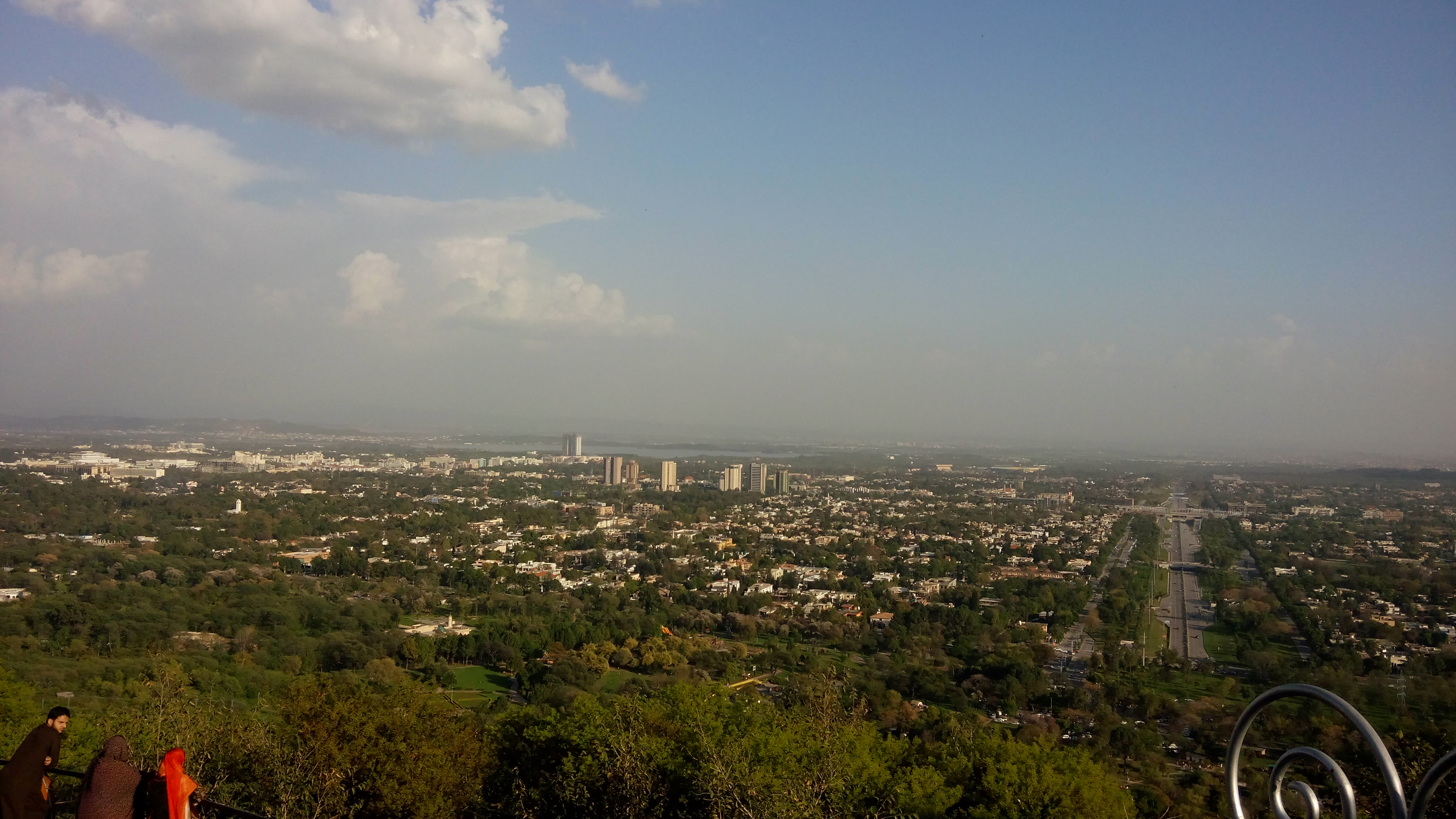
View of Islamabad from Daman-e-Koh

From the southern spot, there is a panoramic view of Islamabad. Faisal Mosque, Seventh Avenue, and Rawal Lake are all visible to the visitors.

In addition, there are observational telescopes installed. Furthermore, there is a substantial sign nearby, which displays an authentic map of Islamabad.

== Renovation ==
Electric-powered vehicles and an expanded car-parking area were added by the Capital Development Authority.

== Gallery ==
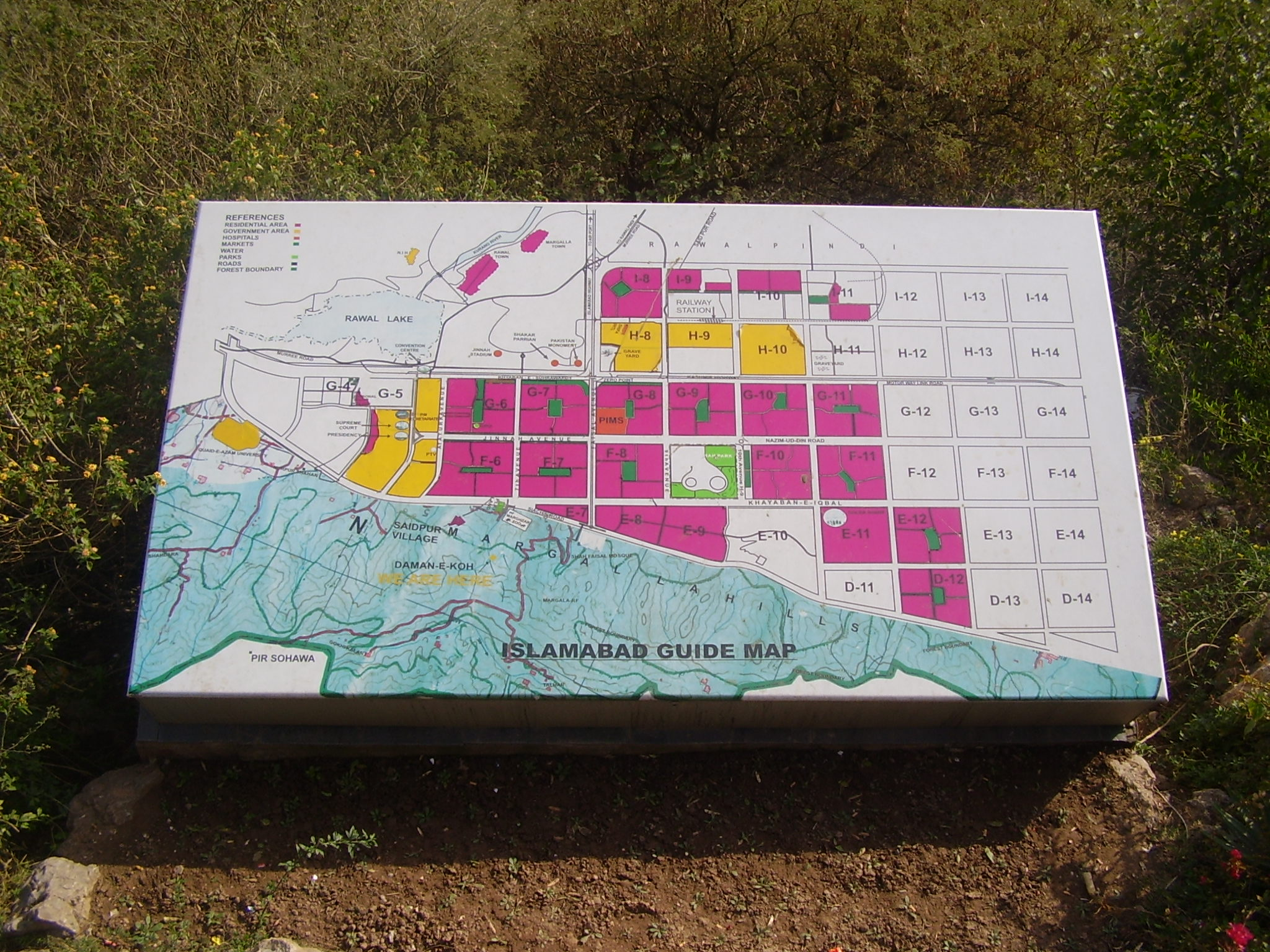
Map of Islamabad

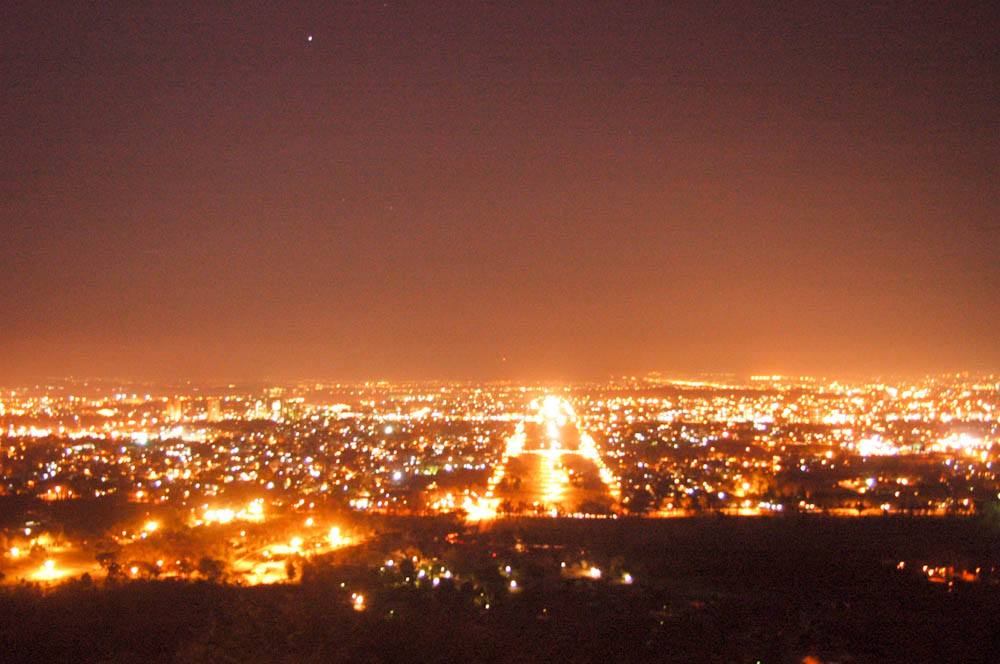
View of Seventh Avenue from Daman-e-Koh at night

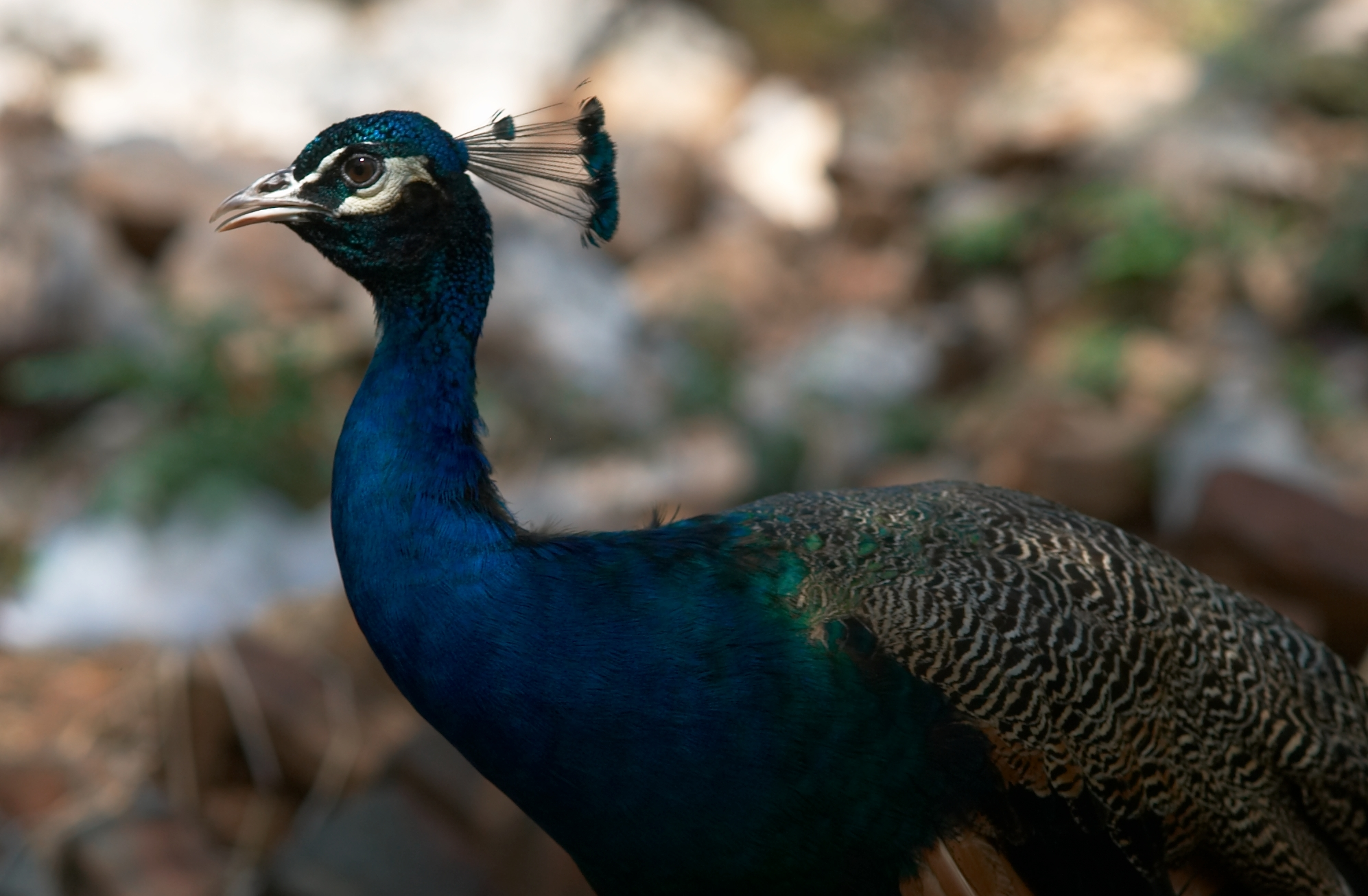
A peacock at Daman-e-Koh

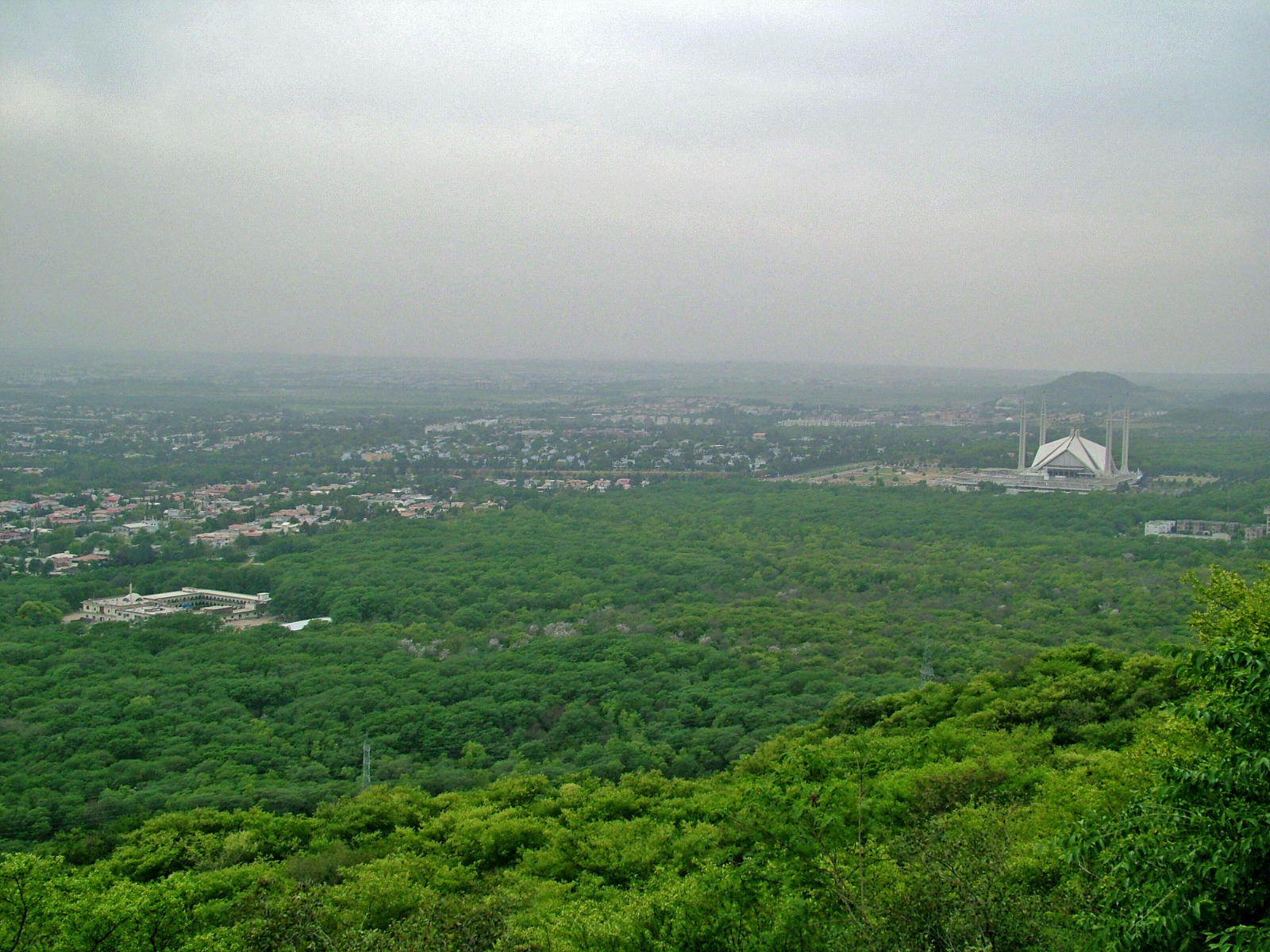
View of Faisal Mosque and Jamia Faridia from Daman-e-Koh

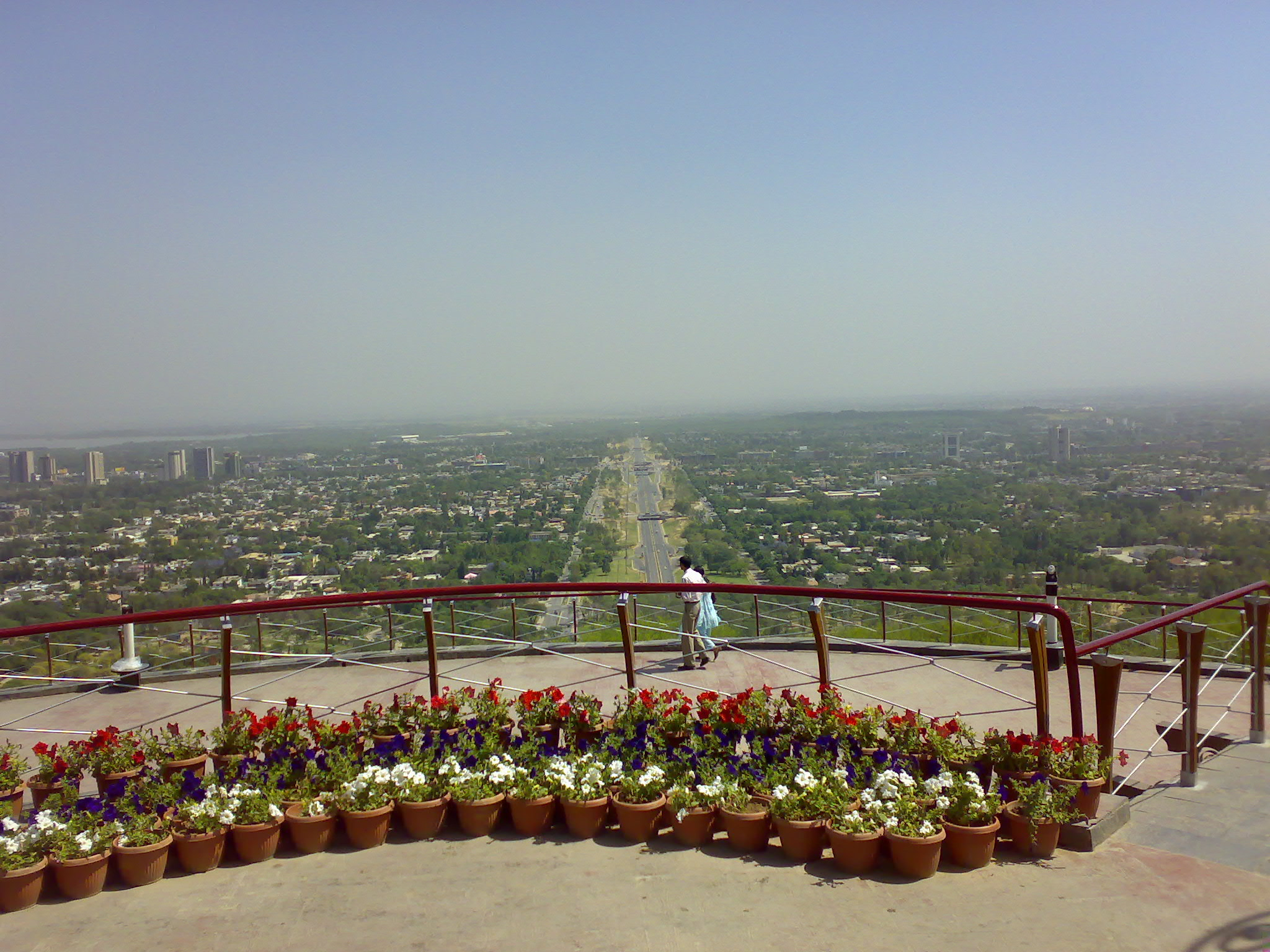
View of Islamabad from Daman-e-Koh

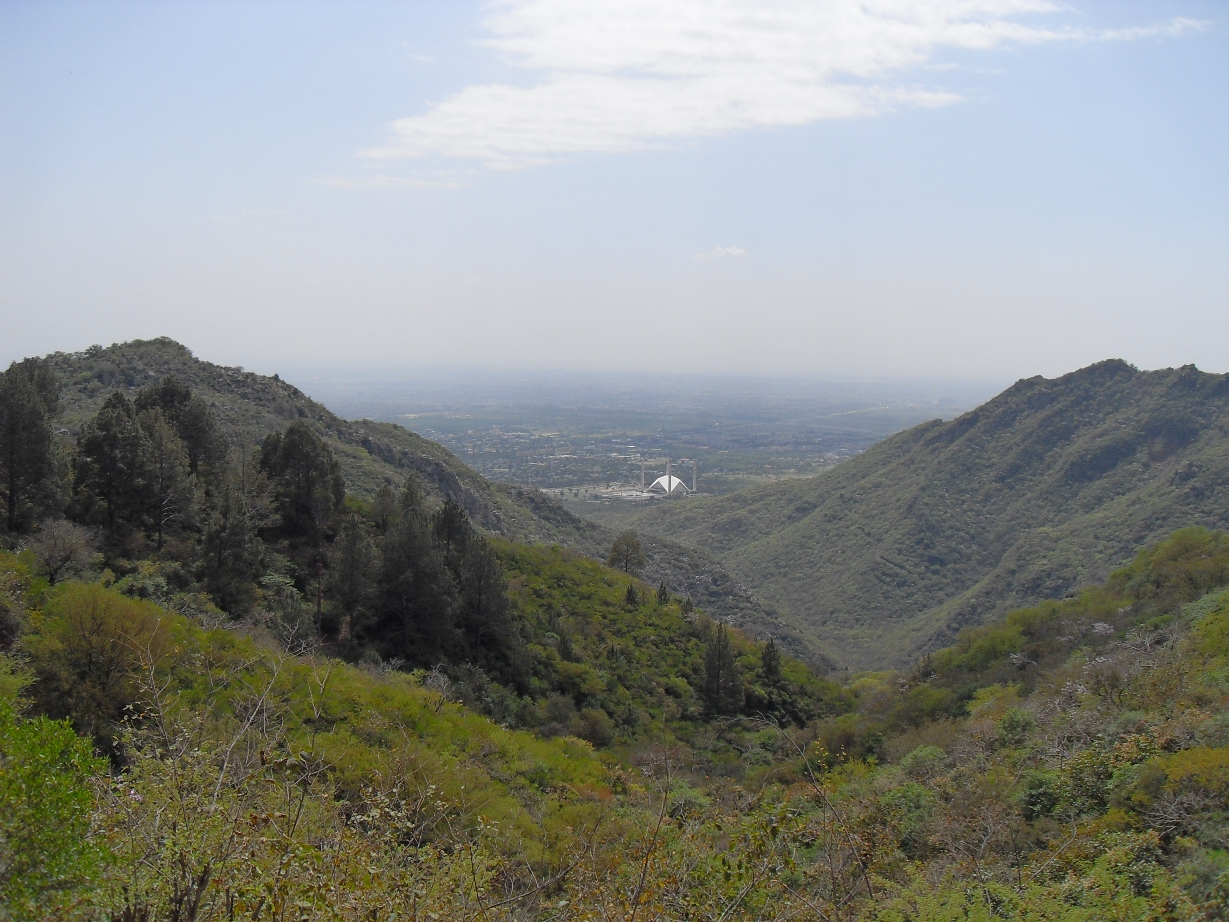
View of Faisal Mosque from Daman-e-Koh

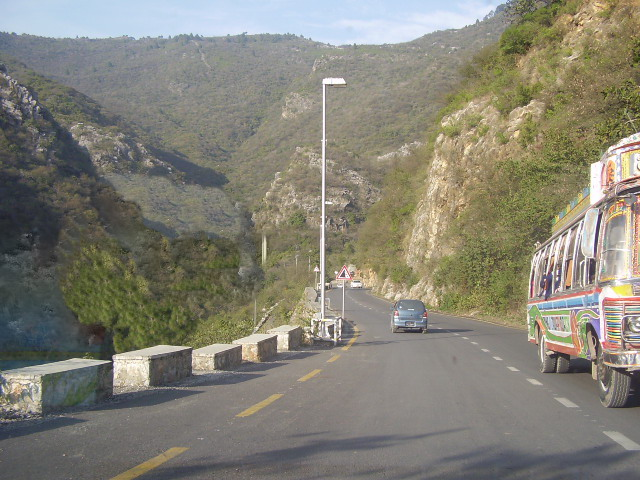
The road to Daman-e-Koh

The view of Jamia Faridia from the viewpoint

== See also ==
- Pir Sohawa
- Capital Development Authority
- Developments in Islamabad
