= Pir Sohawa =

Tourist resort in Pakistan

Coordinates: 33°45′37″N 73°3′56″E

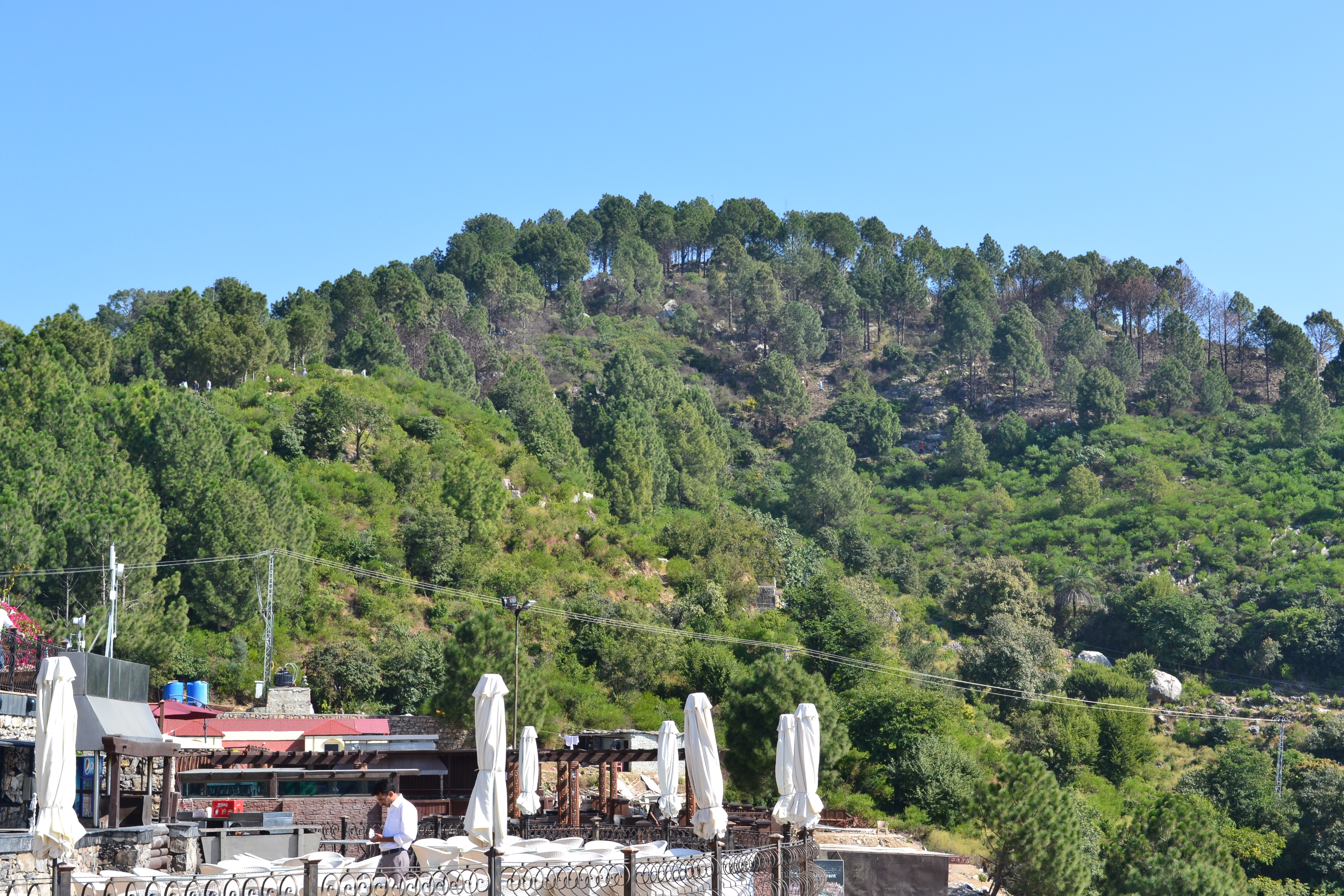
Tilla Grani 1181 metres

Pir Sohawa (Urdu: پیر سوہاوہ) is a rapidly developing tourist resort located 17 kilometres (11 mi) from Islamabad on top of Margalla Hills. It has a 914.4 plus metres elevation and is geographically part of Haripur District.

Like many other parts of the Margalla Hills, Haripur and Galyat mountains, Pir Sohawa sees rapid, uncontrolled development and encroachment on National Park land, which results in damages to the environment through pollution and heavy traffic.

On 6 January 2012, after almost six years, Pir Sohawa received few millimetres of snowfall.

== Tourist attractions ==
Pir Sohawa is at the top of several hiking trails of the Margalla Hills.

Dino Valley is a large theme park in the hills, having a variety of cafes and children's play areas for all ages. Its location adds to the traffic problems along Pir Sohawa road.

== See also ==
- Daman-e-Koh
- Margalla Hills
