= 2011–12 Pakistan federal budget =

Pakistani Federal Budget

2012 Budget of the Islamic Republic of Pakistan federal government
- Emblem of Pakistan
- Submitted: 3 June 2011
- Submitted by: Dr Abdul Hafeez Shaikh
- Submitted to: National Assembly
- Passed: 1 July 2011
- Country: Pakistan
- Total revenue: 2.463 Trillion PKR (26.7 Billion USD)
- Total expenditures: 3.767 Trillion PKR(39.9 Billion USD)
- Deficit: 1.304 Trillion PKR (13.2 Billion USD) or 6.6 percent of GDP
- Debt: $50.76 (dec 2009)
- Website: http://www.finance.gov.pk/ Ministry of Finance

The Pakistan federal budget of 2011–2012 was presented in the National Assembly with a total outlay of 3.767 trillion rupees for fiscal year 2011–12. The budget was prepared in accordance with the budgeting and accounting classification system approved by the Government of Pakistan as an integral part of the new accounting model. The three year's medium-term indicative budget ceilings were issued to all principal accounting officers of the federal government. A new budget preparation method, called the 'output based budgeting' was introduced, which presented the federal budget by services and effects of services on target population and linked them with performance indicators and targets over the 3-year period. The budget was called 'pro-poor budget' by the parliamentarians.

== Overview ==
The budget 2011–12 had the following main salient features:

- The total outlay of budget 2011–12 was Rs 3,767 billion. This was 14.2% higher than the size of budget estimates 2010–11.
- The resource availability during 2011–12 was estimated at Rs 2,463 billion against Rs 2,256 billion in the budget estimates of 2010–11.
- Net revenue receipts for 2011–12 were estimated at Rs 1,529 billion, indicating an increase of 11% over the budget estimates of 2010–11.
- The provincial share in federal revenue receipts was estimated at Rs 1,203 billion during 2011–12, which is 16.4% higher than the budget estimates for 2010–11.
- The capital receipts (net) for 2011–12 were estimated at Rs 396 billion against the budget estimates of Rs 325 billion in 2010–11 i.e. an increase of 11%.
- The external receipts in 2011–12 were estimated at Rs 414 billion. This was an increase of 7.1% over the budget estimates for 2010–11.
- The overall expenditure during 2011–12 was estimated at Rs 2,767 billion of which the current expenditure was Rs 2,315 billion and development expenditure Rs 452 billion. Current expenditure showed an increase of less than 1% over the revised estimates of 2010–11, while development expenditure increased by 64.4% in 2011–12 over the revised estimates of 2010–11.
- The share of current expenditure in total budgetary outlay for 2011–12 was 83.7% compared to 89.7% in revised estimates for 2010–11.
- The expenditure on General Public Services (inclusive of debt servicing transfer payments and superannuation allowance) was estimated at Rs 1,660 billion which was 71.1% of the current expenditure.
- The size of Public Sector Development Programme for 2011–12 was Rs 730 billion, while for Other Development Expenditure an amount of Rs 97 billion was allocated. The programme had an increase of 58% over the revised estimates 2010–11.
- The provinces were allocated Rs 430 billion for budget estimates 2011–12 in their Public Sector Development Programme compared to against Rs 373 billion in 2010–11.
- An amount of Rs 10 billion was allocated to Earthquake Reconstruction and Rehabilitation Authority in the Public Sector Development Programme 2011–12.
- Interest payments Rs. 791 billion, repayment of foreign loans Rs. 243 billion, and subsidies Rs.166 billion.

Classification	Budget 2010–11 (PKR in millions)	Revised 2010–11 (PKR in millions)	Budget 2011–12 (PKR in millions)
RESOURCES	2,256,278	2,107,150	2,463,292
Internal Resources	1,869,659	1,817,325	2,049,363
Revenue Receipts (Net)	1,377,350	1,238,188	1,528,829
Capital Receipts (Net)	325,384	459,332	395,652
Estimated Provincial Surplus	166,925	119,805	124,882
External Resources	386,620	289,824	413,929
EXPENDITURE	2,422,823	2,559,367	2,766,816
Current Expenditure	1,997,892	2,295,921	2,314,859
Federal PSDP	290,000	196,000	300,000
Development Loans & Grants to Provinces	31,385	21,929	54,871
Other Development Expenditure	123,545	45,517	97,085
Est. Operational Shortfall in PSDP	(20,000)	0	0
Bank Borrowing	166,544	452,217	303,524

== Revenue receipt ==
Receipts	Rs. in Trillion
Tax Revenue	2,074
Non – Tax Revenue	657.9
Revenue Receipts (Gross)	2,732.1
Revenue Receipts (Net)	1,528.8

== Allocation to provincial governments ==
Allocation of shares to the provincial governments were:

Provinces	percentage
Balochistan	9.09%
Khyber Pakhtunkhwa	14.62%
Punjab	51.74%
Sindh	24.55%

Additional resources were allocated for Khyber Pakhtunkhwa and Balochistan for development and to meet the expenses on war on terror, respectively. Any shortfall in Balochistan's amount was made up by the federal government from its resources.

== See also ==
- Ministry of Commerce (Pakistan)
- List of tariffs in Pakistan
- Ministry of Finance (Pakistan)
- Pakistan Board of Investment
- Trading Corporation of Pakistan
- Rice Export Association of Pakistan
- Economy of the OIC
- Finance Minister of Pakistan
- Finance Secretary of Pakistan
- Economic Coordination Committee
- Planning Commission (Pakistan)

Budgets

- 2013 Pakistan federal budget
- 2014 Pakistan federal budget
