= Raisman =

Raisman is a surname. Notable people with the surname include:

- Jeremy Raisman (1892–1978), British administrator in India and banker
- Geoffrey Raisman (1939–2017), British neuroscientist
- Aly Raisman (born 1994), American artistic gymnast

== See also ==
- Raisman Program, a series of economic reforms, named after Jeremy Raisman, established by Pakistan in 1951
- Raizman
- Roisman
