= National Finance Commission Award =

Series of economic reforms in Pakistan

The National Finance Commission Award (NFC) is a series of planned economic programs in Pakistan enacted since 1951. Constituted under the Article 160 of the Constitution, the program was established to take control of financial imbalances and equally managed the financial resources to four provinces to meet their expenditure liabilities while alleviating the horizontal fiscal imbalances. As per Constitution, the program awards the designs of financial formulas of economic distribution to provincial and federal government for five consecutive years. All together, a total of seven awards has been enacted since its emergence in 1951, by Prime Minister Liaquat Ali Khan. Stipulations and directions mentioned by the Constitution, the provincial governments and federal government compete to get higher share of the program's revenues in order to stabilize their own financial status.

Intergovernmental transfer of economic resources is chaired by the President of Pakistan whose constitutional purpose is to supervise the system of fiscal transfer to correct the vertical fiscal imbalance between provincial and federal government, and horizontal fiscal imbalances between four provinces. Government financial specialists, mathematicians, and economists studied the mathematical and statistical aspects of the program before recommending the government to enact the program. Due to the program producing a political realignment and the constitutional stipulation regarded a unanimous political consensus between four provinces, the program has few conclusive results, and only seven awards has been enacted since its emergence in 1951.

In 2010, after series of reaching the consensus and public debates successfully concluded the enactment of conclusive seventh award by the program, which affected the distribution formula. In a statement released by Finance Minister Shaukat Tarin, the inverse population density, and the derivative poverty rate has become a new parametric factor in calculating the program's awards.

== Constitutional Basis ==
The National Finance Commission is constitutionally established by the Constitution which laid the foundation of equal distribution of revenues between the federal and four provincial governments of Pakistan. The Constitution grants powers to President of Pakistan to constitute the program in five consecutive years. The Constitution further stated:

1. The share of the Provinces in each Award of National Finance Commission shall not be less than the share given to the Provinces in the previous Award.
2. The Federal Finance Minister and Provincial Finance Ministers shall monitor the implementation of the Award biannually and lay their reports before both the State Parliament and Provincial Assemblies.

Within six months of the commencing day and thereafter at intervals not exceeding five (consecutive) years, the President shall constitute a National Finance Commission consisting of the Minister of Finance of the Federal Government, the Ministers of Finance of the Provincial Governments, and such other persons as may be appointed by the President after consultation with the Governors of the Provinces.

— Article 160–165A: Finance, Property, Contracts and Suits; Part-VI, Chapter:1 Finance, source: The Constitution of Pakistan

== History ==
=== Raisman Program in 1951 ===
The program's existence emerged in 1951 when Prime Minister Liaquat Ali Khan responded remarkably for initiating a series of new economic programs. This revenue sharing program was called "Raisman Award Program" (officially declared as Raisman Award of 1951), and was notified on 1 April, 1952. The Raisman program had gained control of taxation and transferred to federal government with allocations of 50% of proceeds to the provinces. Since 1951, there were only three of these awards (1961, 1964 and 1970) enacted by the Raisman program. All of these were given in unusual circumstances and their results remained inconclusive. The Raisman program enacted the awards during the promulgation of One Unit Program, and equally distributed with West-Pakistan and East-Pakistan. In 1970, the Raisman program enacted the third award during the martial law and a year before East Pakistan seceded. Its results too remained inconclusive which became a one reason for this secession was also their resentment on the revenue distributions of the past.

=== National Finance Commission ===
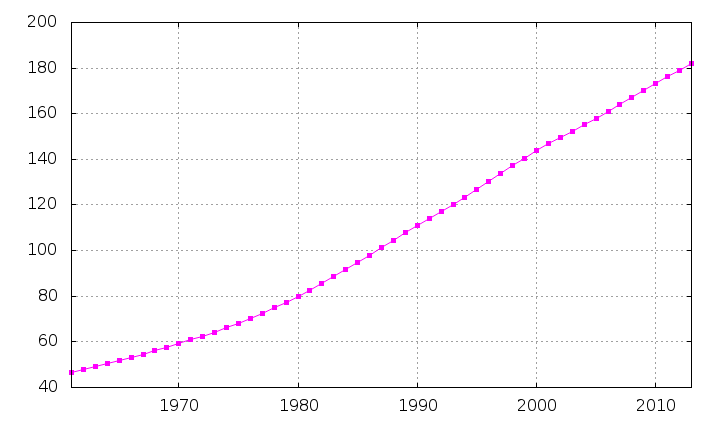
The exponential function graph showed that Pakistan's population grew at exponential rate after 1971.

After the separation of East-Pakistan as a direct resulting end of war with India in 1971, Prime Minister Zulfikar Ali Bhutto's government formed the commission under Chief Justice Hamoodur Rahman to investigate and study the loss of East Pakistan. While many factors had pointed out by the commission, generally marking the political, economic, ideological and geophysical reasons but the one emphasized the "Distribution of Resources" between each contingent. Controversially, the economic distribution of financials fund, grants, and resources were based on GNP performances and tax collection. The issue of population growth was never calculated and even raised by any civil servant or bureaucrat, since many had realized that if such factors determined, it would have resulted in greater share of East-Pakistan from the Federal Divisible Pool or in Federal Budget for East and West Pakistan.

Efforts were applied to end the economic disparity and depression among federal government and provincial governments of Pakistan by the government. While drafting the new Constitution in 1973, the issue of financial distributions, economic equality, and economic justice was specifically mentioned in separate chapter of the Constitution. The Article 160 of the Constitution of Pakistan, laid the foundation and legal basis of the National Finance Commission (NFC) and provides the logical framework of (NFC), in 1973. The Constitution was unanimously approved by the all and major political parties in the country, and successfully promulgated the Constitution in 1973. During the fiscal period from 1973 to 1974, Zulfikar Ali Bhutto and his government collaborated with the provincial governments of four provinces and successfully enacted the first financial award under NFC program; the first award proved to be a success after it had produced a positive conclusive results in 1974.

The NFC program is viewed a step forward towards decentralization and establishment of fiscal federalism to promote equality, accountability, cost effectiveness, and opportunities for empowering and serving the poorest people in four provinces.

== NFC Formulation ==
=== Financial mathematics and statistics ===
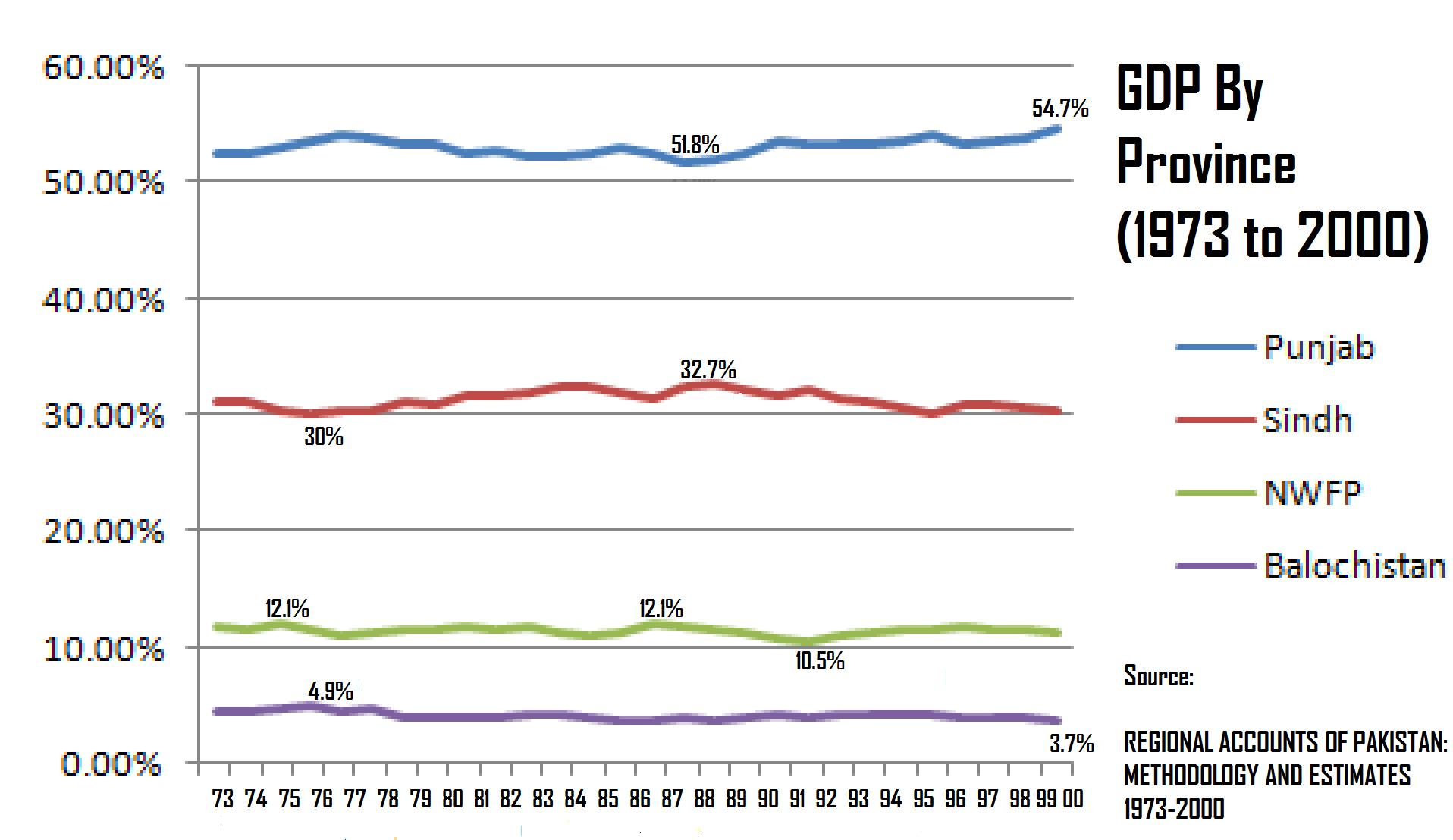
GDP rate of Four Provinces of Pakistan.

The NFC Award is enacted through mathematical formulation between federal government and provincial governments. The NFC generalizes the five kinds of taxation, including the income taxes, sales tax, wealth taxes, capital gains taxes, and custom duties taxes. The program is constituted under President of Pakistan who coordinated and supervised the studies and calculations conducted by financial specialists, economists, statisticians, and mathematicians.

In 1997, changes in NFC formulation was carried out by Prime Minister Nawaz Sharif after including the custom duties taxes with the award. Before 1991, the custom duties taxes revenue had been awarded to federal government while the revenue of Worker Welfare Fund (WWF) remained in the four provinces where they are collected. The principality of 1991 NFC Award specifies that 63.12% of collected revenue of taxes were directed to the federal government and 37% distributed to the four provinces. Prime Minister Sharif was widely credited for declaring a consensus on formulating the 7th NFC Award with some positive recommendations. Earlier in 1991, the financial resources were vertically distributed at a fixed ratio of 20:80 among federal and provincial governments.

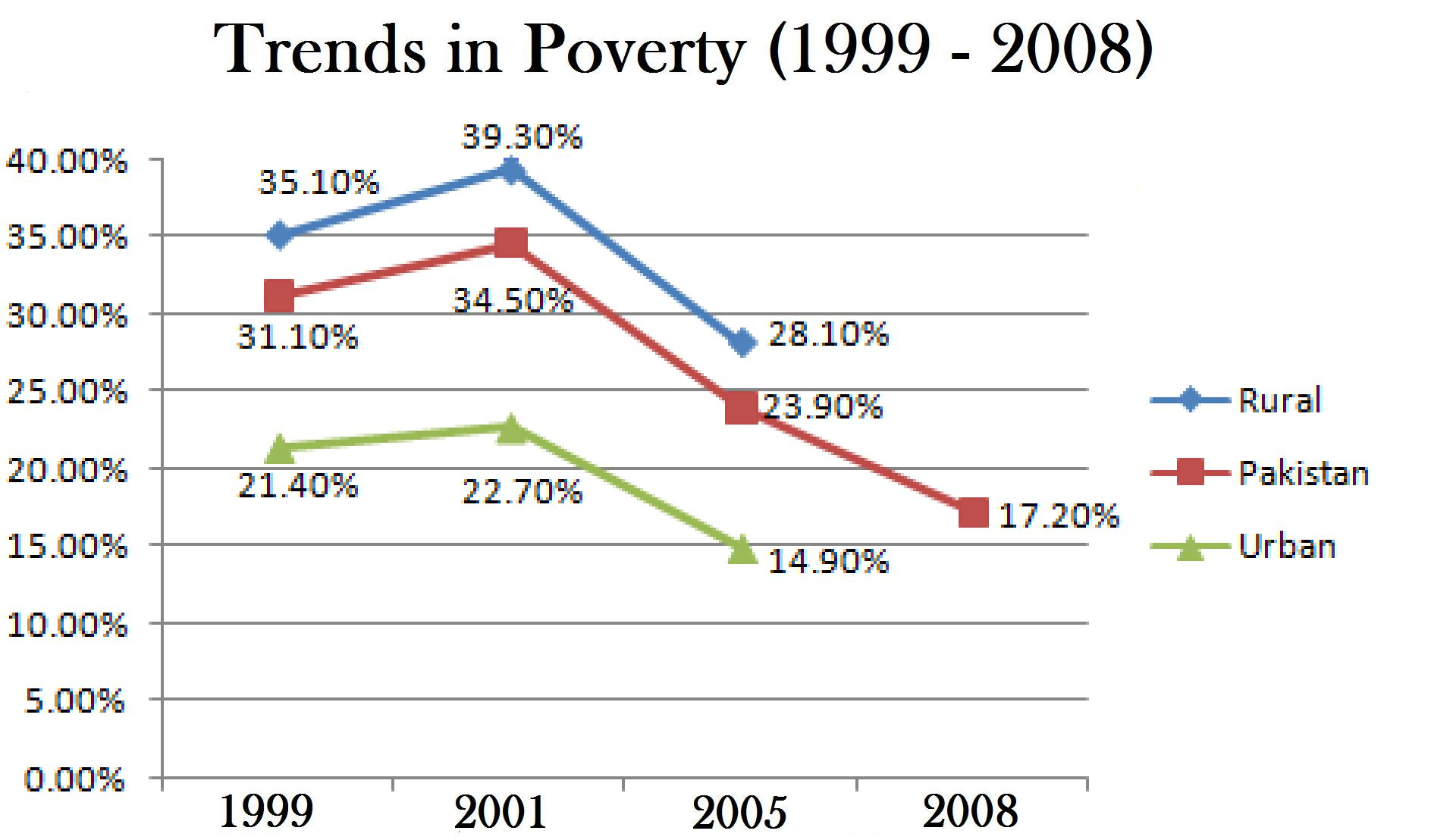
In 2009, the factor of poverty was inserted in determining the NFC Award.

Majority of the taxation and revenues are collected from Punjab and Sindh provinces of Pakistan. Almost all custom duties are collected at the Port of Karachi. Based on the formula determined in 1997, the taxation revenue collected from four provinces are: 65% of taxation revenue are collected from Sindh; the 25% taxation revenue from comes from the Punjab; 7.01% of taxation revenue collections are collected from Khyber-Pakhtunkhwa; lastly only 3.09% of taxation are collected from the largest province, Balochistan.

Due to a constitutional obligation, the NFC Award can not be announced if the four provinces have failed to develop consensus. Minor changes in NFC formulations were carried out by Finance minister Shaukat Aziz in 2001, allocating ~50% of revenue to the four provinces against the prevailing formula of 62.89% as of 1995 NFC calculations. In 2005, President Pervez Musharraf finalizes the formula and enacted the award under the NFC program by the ratio of 52:48 among federal government and provincial governments.

=== Current formula and factorial changes ===
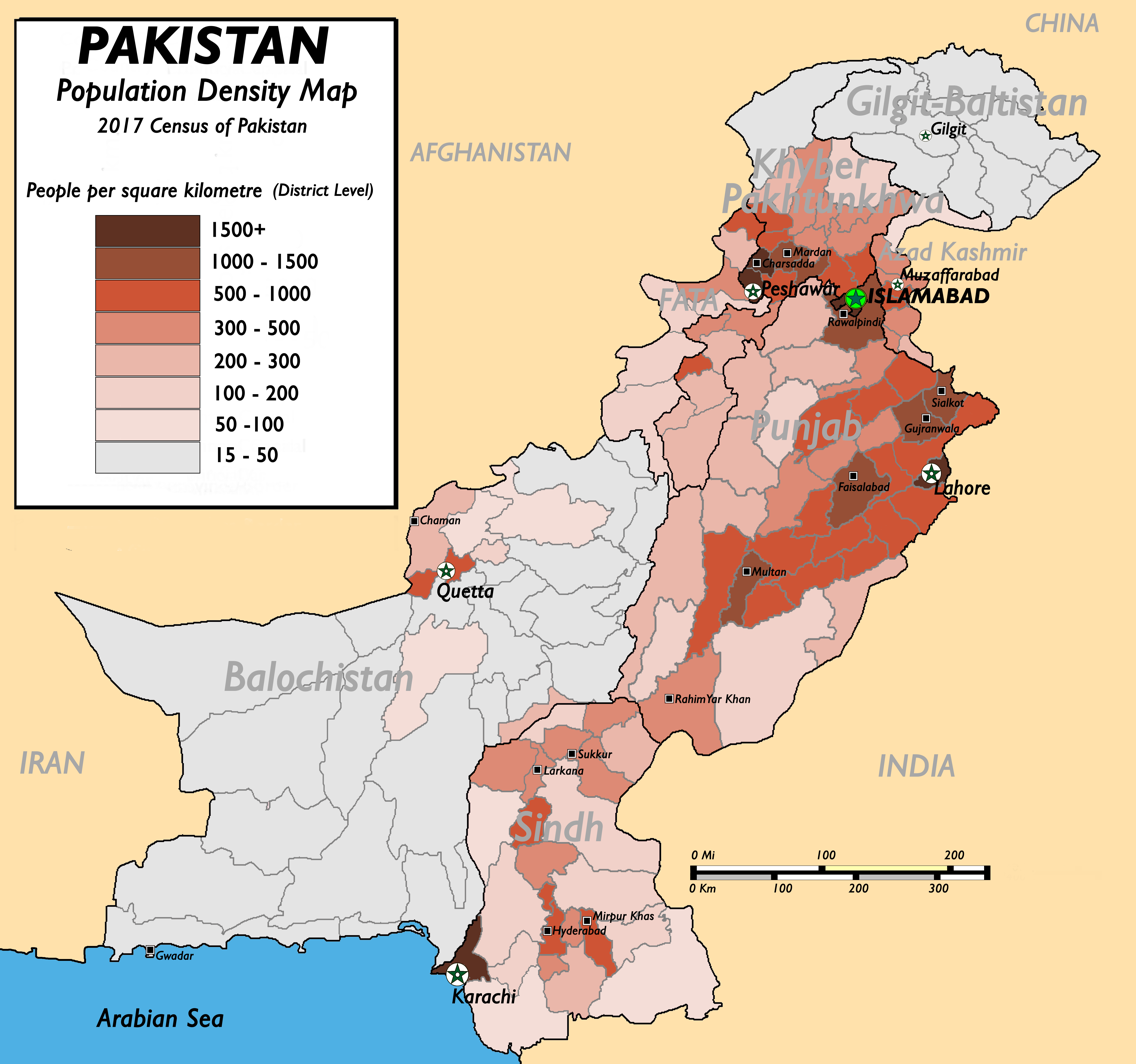
The inverse population density became prime factor in calculating the NFC awards program.

Due to growing economic and financial demands, the NFC formula had to be changed to modern formula to compete with economic challenges. In 2009, Finance Minister Shaukat Tarin stated that population won't be the only parametric equation used in calculating the next NFC award. For the economic and financial distribution of the new award under the NFC program, factors such as inverse population density and rate of change in poverty have also been added and inserted in equations calculating the NFC formula by mathematicians and government statisticians in their research. In 2009, the work on new formula begins to determine the formula for new NFC award, with political parties began meeting leaders of provincial parties.

After reaching consensus with the four provinces and the federal government, the seventh NFC award was enacted by the program and ultimately, the seventh award produced the conclusive results. The seventh NFC award has allotted 82.98% of financial grants to four provinces to weight to population, in which approximately 10.3% of financial grants shares were asked to be spent on reduction of poverty in the country. Under the new formula, approximately 51.74% of revenue shares were directed to Punjab; ~24.55% to Sindh; ~14.62% to Khyber Pakhtunkhwa; and ~9.09% to Balochistan Province; all shares were distributed based upon their performances. Finally in 2009, President Asif Ali Zardari signed the final release papers and enacted the 7th NFC Award under the NFC program.

The seventh award under the NFC program showed the multiplication and divisional factors and the functions in respect to following listed issues:

  - Inverse population decay and exponential rate
  - The derivative change of poverty and societal backwardness
  - Provincial GDP growth and revenue collection
  - Urban density factor

== Previous awards under NFC program ==
Since 1951, there had been three awards enacted during the fiscal years of 1951, 1961 and 1970 under undisclosed circumstances, and their results remained inconclusive. Before 1951, the sales tax was in the exclusive domain of provincial governments, and it was partly federalized to the extent of 50% in 1951 under the Raisman Program of Prime Minister Liaquat Ali Khan. However, it was in 1974 when all sales tax was completely federalized and Prime minister Zulfikar Ali Bhutto declared population as the only criterion for distribution of revenue.

The first official NFC award was enacted under this program in 1974 by the government of Prime minister Zulfikar Ali Bhutto, which produced a conclusive results. However, the two NFC Awards enacted during the fiscal period of 1979 and 1984 remained inconclusive as President Zia-ul-Haq failed to reach consensus and ended in a deadlock. The first award was enacted as setting the population as the only criterion for revenue distribution among the provinces. Custom duties, the main revenue earner was kept out of the divisible pool and the sales tax was completely federalized.

The fourth NFC award was declared in 1991 by the PML government after successfully reaching a consensus with the four provinces. For the first time in the short history of Pakistan, the fourth NFC Award had recognized the rights of the provinces on natural resources, and the provinces were given royalty and gas development surcharge on oil and gas. The first fifth NFC Award was announced in 1995 by Prime Minister Benazir Bhutto. The first fifth award remained highly controversial and debatable on the country's news channels. Soon, the second fifth award was announced by Prime minister Nawaz Sharif in 1997 after his rival, Benazir Bhutto, was dismissed. Although it remains conclusive on many parts, the opposition targeted the implementation of the program.

Chronology
Awards listing order (s)	NFC Award Listing(s)	Presented by	Tests, Results, and Status	Projected Fiscal year
First	NFC Award 1974	Zulfikar Ali Bhutto	Conclusive	1974–79
Second	NFC Award 1979	Zia-ul-Haq	Inconclusive	1979–84
Third	NFC Award 1985	Zia-ul-Haq	Inconclusive	1985–90
Fourth	NFC Award 1991	Nawaz Sharif	Conclusive	1991–96
Fifth	NFC Award 1995	Benazir Bhutto	Inconclusive	1995–2000
	NFC Award 1997	Nawaz Sharif	Conclusive	1997–2002
Sixth	NFC Award 2002	Pervez Musharraf	Inconclusive	2002–07
Seventh	NFC Award 2010	Yousaf Raza Gillani	Conclusive	2010–15
Eighth	NFC Award 2010	Yousaf Raza Gillani	never reached an agreement	2010

All calculations and data provided by Government of Pakistan as public domain

In July 2000, Finance minister Shaukat Aziz presided the convention of National Finance Commission (NFC) to finalize the sixth award, due to constitutional termination of fifth awards program. In 2001, the commission was constituted under President Pervez Musharraf to supervise the work on sixth award. Finally in 2002, the sixth NFC award under the NFC program was enacted by President Pervez Musharraf but failed to reach a consensus decision. Although it was enacted but the sixth award's results remained inconclusive.

In 2010, the seventh NFC award was successfully enacted by President Asif Zardari after reaching a united consensus with the four provinces.

== See also ==
- Financial mathematics in Pakistan
  - Welfare state
  - Modernism in Pakistan
  - Welfare economics
  - Science in Pakistan
- Constitutional economics
  - Constitution of Pakistan
