= 2014–15 Pakistan federal budget =

2014–15 Federal Budget
- Submitted: 3 June 2014
- Submitted by: Ishaq Dar
- Submitted to: National Assembly
- Passed: 21 June 2014
- Country: Pakistan
- Parliament: Pakistan
- Party: PML(N)
- Treasurer: Ministry of Finance
- Total revenue: ₨. 3.94 trillion
- Total expenditures: ₨. 3.937 trillion
- Program Spending: ₨. 4.3 trillion
- Deficit: 4.9% of the GDP
- Website: 2014–15 Budget

The Federal budget 2014–15 was the federal budget of Pakistan for the fiscal year beginning from 1 July 2014 and ending on 30 June 2015.

Presented and submitted by Finance Minister Ishaq Dar on 30 June 2014 at the National Assembly, it was originally outlay ₨. 3.8tn; eventually it was increased to ₨. 4.3tn after several recommendations were inserted on 21 June 2014. This was the second federal budget submitted during the tenure of Prime Minister and his cabinet.

Effective economic policies of the previous budget crawled up the nation's GDP rate to 4.1% for the first time in the last six years; though it fell short of the targeted rate of 4.4% for the 2013–14. In addition, the per capita income grew at dismal 1.41% ($1,386/person) as the economic survey showed that the key indicator the tax-to-GDP ratio was again missed and stood at only 8.8%. The budget proposed a 10.0% relief in the salaries of government employees and an increase in the minimum monthly wage to ₨. 12,000 from ₨. 10,000.

Under this budgetary program, the social security is being raised from ₨. 5000 to ₨.6000. Total revenue collection is approximated at the ₨. 3.943 tn which is 10.1% up compared to the 2013–14. Current expenditures are estimated at ₨. 3.937 tn and the allocation for Public Sector Development Programme (PSDP) for 2014–15 is ₨. 525 billion. The fiscal deficit is kept 4.9% in 2014–15 and total foreign loans Pakistan expects to receive is ₨.869 billion.
