= 2010–11 Pakistan federal budget =

Pakistani Federal Budget

2011 Budget of the Islamic Republic of Pakistan federal government.
- Emblem of Pakistan
- Submitted: 5 June 2010
- Submitted by: Dr Abdul Hafeez Shaikh
- Submitted to: National Assembly
- Passed: 25 June 2010
- Country: Pakistan
- Debt: $52.12 billion (dec 2009)
- Website: http://www.finance.gov.pk/ Ministry of Finance

The Pakistan federal budget of 2010–2011 has been prepared in accordance with the budgeting and accounting classification system that has been approved by the Government of Pakistan as an integral part of the New Accounting Model.

The three years medium-term indicative budget ceilings for the current and development budgets as approved by the Cabinet were issued to all Principal Accounting Officers of the Federal Government.

== Overview ==
The Government of Pakistan announced federal budget for fiscal year 2010–2011 having total volume of more than two and a half trillion rupees on 5 June 2010. Federal Minister for Finance and Economic Affairs Senator Abdul Hafeez Shaikh presented the budget before the National Assembly.

The following major changes reported by federal government:

- Total budget outlay for 2010–11 is Rs 3259 billion, which is 10.7 percent more than the current year.
- 50 percent ad hoc allowance of basic salaries to be granted to government employees.
- GST reduced from 17 to 16 percent.
- Salaries of government employees raised by 50 percent.
- Federal Cabinet cut down its salaries by 10 percent.
- Medical Allowance for employees of Grade-1 to 15 increased by 100 percent. While the raise in medical allowance for employees of Grade-16 to 22 is 15 percent of their basic pay.
- Rs 1 CED imposed on manufacturing of each cigarette.
- Tax revenue is targeted at 1.78 trillion rupees out of which the Federal Board of Revenue will collect 1.667 trillion rupees, about 9.8 percent of GDP.
- Non-tax revenue is targeted at 632.2 billion rupees. Revenue from direct taxes is targeted at 657.7 billion rupees and revenue from indirect taxes is targeted at 1.12 trillion rupees. Subsidies will be reduced to 126.68 billion rupees from 228.99 billion rupees.
- Development spending or the public sector development spending is targeted at 663 billion rupees, with 373 billion rupees allocated for provinces, and 280 billion rupees as the federal component.
- Inflation is targeted at 9.5 percent in 2010/11 fiscal year, down from the central bank's forecast of between 11.5percent and 12.5 percent for the year ending 30 June.
- The defence budget is set at 100.0 billion rupees, a 17percent increase from year 2010.
- The debt-to-GDP ratio has climbed to 55 percent.
- 30 million energy savours will be provided in a bid to conserve electricity.
- Burden of 235 billion on the country's budget due to losses being incurred by state owned enterprises including Pakistan International Airlines (PIA), Pakistan Steel Mills and Pakistan Electric Power Company (PEPCO).
- Three dams to be built in 2010–11.
- Pepco want subsidy of Rs 180 billion.
- 685 billion budget deficit, which is 4 percent of GDP.
- Reformed GST to be implemented from 31 October.
- All non-developmental expenditures frozen.
- 40 billion to be distributed among people from Benazir Income Support Programme.
- Baitul Maal to continue functioning with Rs 2 million.
- Minimum wage raised from Rs 6000 to Rs 7000.
- ADP fixed at 603 billion out of which 52 percent will be given to the provinces.
- GST will be reformed under which instead of 16 to 25 percent GST there should be single 15 percent GST for all. No sales tax on health and food.
- Rs 10 FED imposed per million British thermal unit gas.
- Minimum taxable income for salaried class raised from Rs 200,000 to Rs 300,000.
- Capital Gains Tax of 10 percent being imposed on gains from stocks held for less than 6 months; 7.5 percent on gains from stocks held for 6 months to 1 year and; no tax on capital gains from stocks held for more than a year.
- Custom duty reduced on 29 items.
- Pension raised by 15 percent for the employees who retired before 2001 and 20 percent for those retired after 2001.
- 200,000 unemployed youth will be provided employment for 100 days under Youth Scheme.

== Main allocations ==
Total amount of Rs. 663 billion has been allocated in PSDP-2010-11 for various ongoing and new schemes.

Out of total PSDP, the federal share is Rs. 280 billion, provincial share Rs. 373 billion whereas Rs. 10 billion would be spent for Reconstruction and Rehabilitation of Earthquake-hit areas.

- Rs. 28423.8 million for Water and Power Division (Water Sector)
- Rs. 15227.5 million for Pakistan Atomic Energy Commission.
- Rs. 14565.7 million for Finance Division.
- Rs. 13629.6 million for Railways Division.
- Rs. 9395.7 million for Planning and Development Division.
- Rs. 15762.5 million for Higher Education Commission.
- Rs. 16944.5 million for Health Division.
- Rs. 10873.7 million for Food and Agriculture Division.
- Rs. 3220.1 million for Industries and Production division.
- Rs. 5140.9 million for Education Division.
- Rs. 5584 million for Interior Division.
- Rs. 3887.1 million for Defence Division.
- Rs. 3618.3 million for Housing and Works Division.llll
- Rs. 3618.7 million for Cabinet Division.
- Rs. 4115.5 million for Population Welfare Division.
- Rs. 1646.2 million for Science and Technological research Division.
- Rs. 885.6 million for Livestock and Dairy Development Division.
- Rs. 1000 million for Law and Justice Division.
- Rs. 1000 million for Environment Division.
- Rs. 1000 million for Special Initiatives Division.
- Rs. 1234.7 million for Revenue Division.
- Rs. 623.4 million for Petroleum and Natural Resources Division.
- Rs. 718.3 million for Information Technology and Telecom Division.
- Rs. 1229.7 million for Defence Production Division.
- Rs. 474.1 million for Commerce Division.
- Rs. 149.1 million for Communication Division (other than NHA).
- Rs. 222.6 million for Ports and Shipping Division.
- Rs. 246.9 million for Pakistan Nuclear Regulatory Authority.
- Rs. 152.9 million for Women Development Division.
- Rs. 107.6 million for Social Welfare and Special Education Division.
- Rs. 65.8 million for Labour and Manpower Division.
- Rs. 82.3 million for Local government and Rural Development Division.
- Rs. 125 million for Tourism Division.
- Rs. 140.8 million for Ministry of Foreign Affairs.
- Rs. 549.8 million for Narcotics Control division.
- Rs. 114.4 million for Establishment Division.
- Rs. 353.9 million for Culture Division.
- Rs. 229.6 million for Sports Division.
- Rs. 74.5 for Youth Affairs Division.
- Rs. 509.9 million for Information and Broadcasting Division.
- Rs. 164.6 million for Textile Industry Division.
- Rs. 82.3 million for Statistics Division.
- Rs. 81.1 million for Ministry of Postal Services.
- Rs. 15 million for Economic Affairs Division.
- Rs. 12029.7 million for Water and Power Development Authority (WAPDA)
- Rs. 44637 million for National Highway Authority
- Rs. 10523.5 million for Azad Jammu and Kashmir
- Rs. 6584.9 million for Gilgit-Baltistan (Block and other projects)
- Rs. 8642.6 million for Federally Administered Tribal Areas (FATA).
- Rs. 5000 million for People's Works Programme-I
- Rs. 25000 million for People's Works Programme-II

== Receipt ==
Receipts	Rs. in Billion
Gross Revenue Receipt	2411.0
Tax Revenue	1778.7
Net Revenue Receipt	1377.4
Less Provincial Share	1033.6
Non-Tax Revenue	632.3
External Receipt	386.6
Self Financing of PSDP by provinces	341.6
Net Capital Receipt	325.4
Change in Provincial Cash Balance	166.9
Bank Borrowing	166.5

== Revised budget 2011 ==
- The total outlay of budget 2010–11 was estimated at Rs 2,423 billion. However, this size increased to Rs 2,559 billion in revised estimates 2010–11 or by 5.6%.
- The resource availability during 2010–11 had been estimated at Rs 2,256 billion which declined to Rs 2,107 billion in revised estimates or by 6.6%.
- Net revenue receipts for 2010–11 had been estimated at Rs 1,377 billion indicating a decrease of 10% in revised estimates 2010–11.
- The provincial share in federal revenue receipts was estimated at Rs 1,034 billion during 2010–11 which was decreased to Rs 998 billion in the revised estimates for 2010–11
- The capital receipts (net) for 2010–11 had been estimated at Rs 325 billion which increased to Rs 459 billion in revised estimates 2010–11 i.e. an increaseof 41.2%.
- The external receipts in 2010–11 were estimated at Rs 387 billion. This showed a decrease of 25% over the revised estimates for 2010–11.
- The overall expenditure during 2010–11 had been estimated at Rs 2,423 billion of which the current expenditure was Rs 1,998 billion and development expenditure at Rs 425 billion. Current expenditure showed an increase of 14.9% over the revised estimates of 2010–11, while development expenditure had been decreased by 38.0% in the revised estimates of 2010–11.
- The share of current expenditure in total budgetary outlay for 2010–11 was 82.5% as compared to 89.7% in revised estimates for 2010–11.
- The expenditure on General Public Service (inclusive of debt servicing transfer payments and superannuation allowance) was estimated at Rs 1,388 billion which was 69.5% of the current expenditure.
- The size of Public Sector Development Programme (PSDP) for 2010–11 was Rs 663 billion. Out of which Rs 168 billion was allocated to Federal Ministries/Divisions, Rs 57 billion for Corporations and Rs 30 billion for Special Programme.
- The provinces had been allocated an amount of Rs 373 billion for budget estimates 2010–11 in their PSDP. An amount of Rs 10 billion had been allocated to Earthquake Reconstruction and Rehabilitation Authority (ERRA) in the PSDP 2010–11, which increased to Rs 16 billion in revised estimates.

A comparison between budget estimates and revised estimates 2010–11 in the following Table.

Classification	Budget 2010–11 (PKR in millions)	Revised 2010–11 (PKR in millions)
RESOURCES	2,256,278	2,107,150
Internal Resources	1,869,659	1,817,325
Revenue Receipts (Net)	1,377,350	1,238,188
Capital Receipts (Net)	325,384	459,332
Estimated Provincial Surplus	166,925	119,805
External Resources	386,620	289,824
EXPENDITURE	2,422,823	2,559,367
Current Expenditure	1,997,892	2,295,921
Federal PSDP	290,000	196,000
Development Loans & Grants to Provinces	31,385	21,929
Other Development Expenditure	123,545	45,517
Est. Operational Shortfall in PSDP	(20,000)	0
BANK BORROWING	166,544	452,217

== See also ==
- Ministry of Commerce (Pakistan)
- List of tariffs in Pakistan
- Ministry of Finance (Pakistan)
- Pakistan Board of Investment
- Trading Corporation of Pakistan
- Rice Export Association of Pakistan
- Economy of the OIC
- Finance Minister of Pakistan
- Finance Secretary of Pakistan
- Economic Coordination Committee
- Planning Commission (Pakistan)
