= Austin Macauley Publishers =

British publishing company

- Status: Active
- Founded: 2006
- Country of origin: United Kingdom
- Headquarters location: London
- Distribution: United Kingdom, Republic of Ireland, United States, Australia, New Zealand, Canada
- Publication types: Books
- Official website: www.austinmacauley.com

Austin Macauley Publishers Limited is a British book publisher with offices in London, New York and Sharjah. The company was founded in 2006 and publishes fiction and non-fiction books by both first-time authors and notable individuals and academics in English and Arabic languages.

== Business model ==
The company operates a hybrid publishing model, offering non-contributory or traditional publishing contracts, and some partnership agreement' contracts, in which the author pays a part of the publication cost.

According to Science Fiction and Fantasy Writers of America (SFFWA), the publisher was previously a vanity press which as of 2019 typically required fees from £1,275 upwards from writers. It was discussed in a report by the Writers Guild of Great Britain and the Society of Authors on lack of transparency regarding cost to authors of publishing with the company.

== Notable authors ==
Works by notable authors from different countries - ranging from accomplished academics, businessmen, professionals and experts in different fields, published by the company include:

- Sir Malcolm Roy Jack, former Clerk of House of Commons of the United Kingdom
- Samuel Ley, Cambridge-and-LSE-graduate, legal practitioner
- Jia Jia, Hong Kong independent scholar, intellectual, entrepreneur
- Augendra Bhukuth, PhD. Professor in Economics at IESEG School of Management, Paris.
- W Robert Griffiths KC, SC, British barrister
- Austin Stevens
- Carey Blyton
- Tariq Anwar
- Javaid Laghari, Pakistan Professor, former chairperson of Higher Education Commission of Pakistan
- Maryam Saqer Al Qasimi
- Ira David Wood III
- Lawrence Salander
- Oliver Friggieri
- Bonita Lawrence Professor at York University, Canada (research focus: indigenous identity)
- Simon May British philosopher and visiting professor at King's College London
- Claire Liddell
- Kevin Lueshing
- Des Lynam OBE, British broadcaster

== Affiliations ==
Associated with Independent Publishers Guild (IPG) Austin Macauley Publishers is a member of The Publishers Association.
