= Roisman =

Roisman is a surname. Notable people with the surname include:

- Elad L. Roisman, American lawyer
- Florence Roisman, American legal scholar
- Lois Roisman (1938–2008), American philanthropist, playwright, and poet

== See also ==
- Groisman
- Raisman
