= 2013–14 Pakistan federal budget =

2013-14 Federal Budget
- Emblem of Pakistan
- Country: Pakistan
- Deficit: 6.3% of the GDP
- Website: Ministry of Finance

The Federal Budget 2013–14 was the federal budget of Pakistan for the fiscal year beginning from 1 July 2013 and ending on 30 June 2014. The budget was presented by Finance Minister Ishaq Dar on 12 June 2013 during a session of the National Assembly. This is the first federal budget presented during the tenure of newly elected Prime Minister Nawaz Sharif and his cabinet since the change of government following the nationwide general elections held in 2013.

The new budget has an outlay of ₨. 3.51 trillion and is designed to achieve a 4.4% growth rate in the economy over the next fiscal year. The budget seeks to address the country's energy crisis, reduce non-development expenditures and bring about a range of new economic policies of the elected government. The government has termed the budget as "an investment and business friendly budget."

Although no new property taxes were levied in Federal Budget but the provincial Punjab Budget 2013–14 imposed new taxes on property. Property sellers were made liable to pay a fixed percentage of tax which decreases as the retention period increases. Despite imposition of the heavy taxation, country's leading economists and financial experts believe it won't hamper the growth of the booming property market of Pakistan. The budget also allocates ₨. 57.4 billion for development of various areas in higher education— highest in the history of Pakistan.

== Federal expenses and revenues ==
Initial financial calculations were aimed towards the budget makers with an ambitious target by the incoming PML-N government to bring down next year's fiscal deficit by about 2.50% of GDP through a combination of revenue and expenditure control measures of over ₨. 550 billion. With an interaction with Dar, the senior economists and officials of the Finance ministry gave out an understanding that current year's budget deficit would be restricted within 7.5pc of GDP or less than ₨. 1.8 trillion. Instructions were given to bureaucrats by Dar that the deficit to be scaled down by about 2.5pc of GDP and desired the budget makers to design next year's budget on those lines.

Total revenue target for 2013–14 was ₨. 3.42 billion including share of provinces of ₨. 1.502 billion. Total Net Receipts were of ₨. 3.591 billion, out of which ₨. were bank borrowings. Detail of federal expenses and revenues is a follows:

Federal Expenses(%)
Interest Payments	32.0%
Defence Affairs and Services	17.0%
Federal Public Sector Development Programme	15.0%
Grants and Transfers	9.0%
Running operations of the Government of Pakistan	8.0%
Subsidies	7.0%
Military Pensions	4.0%
Development Expenses	5.0%
Civil Pensions	1.0%
Provision for Pay and other Pensions	1.0%
Net Lending	1.0%

Federal Revenue(%)
Net Revenue Receipts	53.0%
Bank Borrowings and loans	27.0%
Net Capital Receipts	14.0%
Net External Receipts	5.0%
Estimated Provincial Surplus	1.0%

=== 2013–2014 Fiscal Budget ===
On 13 June 2013, Dar presented the federal budget for 2013–14, which was termed as "business friendly". Total outlay of the federal budget was ₨. 3.5 trillion with an annual deficit of 6.3%; the inflation was set at 9.5% as the GDP growth was projected at 4.8%. The budget putted ₨. 1.55tn for the PSDP; additional allocation of ₨. 75 billion for the BISP; the defence expenditure was kept at ₨. 627 billion as the debt servicing was near at the ₨. 926 billion. The GST was increased from 16% to 17% as the social security was up by 10%, with minimum raised from ₨. 3000 to ₨. 5000; the ₨. 225 billion was reserved for energy sector development.

The tax exemption for luxury cars was proposed to be abolished while 1200CC hybrid vehicles are being exempted form import duty. A concession of 50.01% had been proposed for 1200–1800CC hybrid vehicles. Recommendations were to include ₨. 20,000 tax be applicable on the purchase of 1000CC cars. A withholding tax on wedding ceremonies being held at commercial venues has also been proposed along with taxes on foreign movies and dramas. Additional taxation on cigarettes, paan, and chahliya were also been increased. The GDP growth rate was set to target for 2013–14 at 4.8% and revenue targeted at ₨. 2.475tn. The non-tax income was set around ₨. 800 billion as the government had allocated ₨. 185 billion as energy subsidy.

Finance Minister Ishaq Dar maintained that the circular debt amounted to more than ₨. 500 billion was to be eliminated in 60 days. The budget proposes to abolish the ministers' discretionary funds. Initiation of the Laptops scheme was approved by the government and the Customs duty on water filtration equipment was proposed to be decreased while the people's works program renamed as Tamir-e-Watan Pakistan program (lit. Nation–building Pakistan Programme). Finance Minister Ishaq Dar said that the auction for 3G technology was to be held soon and the borrowing from the State Bank of Pakistan (SBP) will be reduced. The rate of inflation will be kept under single digit and its targeted rate for 2013–14 has been fixed at 9.5%t. He said the government inherited a battered economy and the average rate of inflation stood at 13.1% in last five years."

== Opinions ==
=== Commercial and public opinion ===
Responding to the budget, dr. Farrukh Saleem hailed the budget and termed it "Historic budget", as large portion of the budget was related towards the development of country's civil sector, higher education, highway infrastructure, and electricity sector. Spending on governmental infrastructure was drastically reduced to 45.5% and the Prime Minister's Secretariat had voluntarily given up its ₨. 42 billion discretionary fund. According to Farrukh Salim, the budget had shown as sign of "political maturity" as in the past governments had always abandoned schemes—whether good or bad—of their predecessors.

The budget was aimed to fill the ₨. 500 billion circular debt in state-owned enterprises for the first time since the nationalization programme began back in the January 1972. The budget deficit was to be scaled down from ₨. 2.2tn to ₨. 1.6tn with increasing the investment-to-GDP ratio to 20.9% as well as increasing international reserves by 100% and keeping inflation in 6.3%.

The main focus of the budget was to increase the spending on higher education, with the allocation of ₨. 57.1 billion and a 50.0% jump in the number of scholarships. As dr. Farrukh Saleem maintained: "Our minister of finance may not make favourable headlines, but he has made history. The document that he has presented makes him a dreamer and an artist —two in one. Someone intelligent once said, "An artist is a dreamer consenting to dream of the actual world."

=== Criticism ===
The budget was criticized over the increase in the GST and the zero-increment on salaries of government personnel. The pro-leftist MQM rejected the budget for the new 2013–14, terming it "a burden on the masses." Addressing a press conference at Nine Zero Secretariat, MQM's convener dr. Farooq Sattar said that the increase of General sales tax (GST) is a "merciless step" for the low-income class people. Dr. Sattar said that no measures were taken to provide relief to the poor masses. He further said that the first priority of the government should be to eliminate electricity loadshedding in the country, but, he added that no steps were taken in this regard. The MQM leader said the PML-N government also failed to introduce any policy to bring back looted money. While criticizing the government, Sattar said that money should be allocated in the budget to counterterrorism efforts."

Schools teachers and educators on the other hand, describe the budget as the "Budget worst in history of Pakistan". The Punjab based SST Teachers Association lashed out at the government for providing no incentives to government employees, including teachers, in the budget. The SST Teachers Association criticised the government for not making increase in salaries of government employees. According to SST Teachers Association, it was for the first time in the country's history that government employees have been totally neglected. The Sindh based APTA association appealed to the PML(N) to reconsider the budget policy to fixing the minimum salary of workers at ₨. 18,000. The salaries of government employees should be increased in accordance with the prevailing price hike, he demanded. The Sindh-based APTA association quoted that the "APTA association, together with the Punjab Teachers Association, would launch a protest movement against the government."

=== Adjustments ===
After the severe criticism from the public, the adjustments were carried out Finance Minister Ishaq Dar and raised salaries of government personnel by 10.2% following recommendations of the committee tasked to review its feasibility. To review the budget, Finance Minister Ishaq Dar had constituted a review committee to review the possibility of an increase in the salaries of government employees.

Initially, the committee proposed 7.5% raise in the salaries, however, Dar said the government has increased it by 10.1%. Senator Dar said the raise in salaries of government employees would be effective from 1 July."

== Governmental views on Federal Budget ==
"Federal Minister for Finance, Senator Muhammad Ishaq Dar said Saturday that the federal budget for the upcoming financial year 2013–14 will be presented before the National Assembly on Wednesday, 12 June after its approval from federal cabinet.The upcoming budget would mainly focus on revival of economy with special concentration on overcoming circular debt to resolve the prevailing energy crisis in the country, Ishaq Dar said while talking to media after assuming the office of Federal Minister for Finance, Revenue and Economic Affairs and Statistics here.

Ishaq Dar said that the government has already devised a strategy to overcome the prevailing challenges at economic front including energy crisis.Before the presentation of the budget in the National Assembly, the meeting of National Economic Council (NEC) was scheduled to be held on Monday 10 June to consider and approve funding for Public Sector Development Programme(PSDP) (2013–14).Senator Ishaq Dar said that the circular debt has expanded to Rs. 500 billion and for resolving energy crisis there is dire need to get rid of this burden adding that the upcoming budget would be devised in a way to come out of this vicious circle.

He was of the view that country was facing several challenges however, added that the government would try its best to overcome these and help economic development. He said that inflation was also one of the pressing issues but it could not be brought down overnight and would take some time to provide relief to masses.

The federal minister said that the debt on government has surged from Rs. 3000 billion up to Rs. 14000 billion and the government is not only bound to pay back the loans but also pay interests according to the schedule.The government would definitely opt for a better mechanism to pay back these loans adding that it was already engaged to devise a proper strategy in this regard adding that some payment are due till December. The federal minister said that the country also have to spend on its defense, infrastructure and other social sector programs. He said that the International Monetary Fund (IMF) post-monitoring program missions is scheduled to visit Pakistan in the third week of June.

On revenues, the federal minister said that the Federal Board of Revenue(FBR) has been directed to achieve its revised tax collection target well in time. The FBR had revised the revenue target from Rs. 2301 to Rs. 2193 and then to Rs. 2116.The minister said that the government would try to achieve the revenue targets it would set for the upcoming fiscal year (2013–14). He said there is dire need to enhance income and resources to help improve economy and lead the country towards progress and prosperity. He stressed the need for striking balance between income and expenditures and informed the media persons that austerity measures will be taken to reduce the expenditures."
