= Raizman =

Raizman is a surname. Notable people with the surname include:

- Maurice Raizman (1905–1974), French chess master
- Yuli Raizman (1903–1994), Russian film director

== See also ==
- Raisman
