= Higher Education Commission (Pakistan) =

Statutory body formed by the Government of Pakistan

- ہائر ایجوکیشن کمیشن

Agency overview
- Formed: 11 September 2002; 24 years ago
- Preceding agency: University Grants Commission
- Jurisdiction: Pakistan
- Headquarters: Islamabad-44000; 33.67°N 73.05°E
- Motto: Facilitating Institutes of higher learning to serve as an Engine of Growth for the Socio-Economic Development of Pakistan
- Annual budget: ₨. 102.4 billion (2013–14)
- Agency executive: Prof. Dr Zia Ul Haq, Executive Director
- Website: hec.gov.pk

The Higher Education Commission (colloquially known as HEC) is a statutory body formed by the Government of Pakistan which was established in 2002 under the Chairmanship of Atta-ur-Rahman. Its main functions are funding, overseeing, regulating and accrediting the higher education institutions in the country.

It was first established in 1974 as University Grants Commission (UGC), and came into its modern form on 11 September 2002 after Atta-ur-Rahman's reforms, which received international praise. The commission is responsible for formulating higher education policy and quality assurance to meet the international standards as well as providing accrediting academic degrees, development of new institutions and uplift of existing institutions in Pakistan.

The commission also facilitated the development of higher educational system in the country with the main purpose of upgrading the universities and degree awarding institutes in the country to be focal point of the high learning of education, research and development. Over several years, it has played an important and leading role towards building a knowledge-based economy in Pakistan by giving out hundreds of doctoral scholarships for education abroad every year.

== History ==
=== 1947–1971: Genesis and development ===
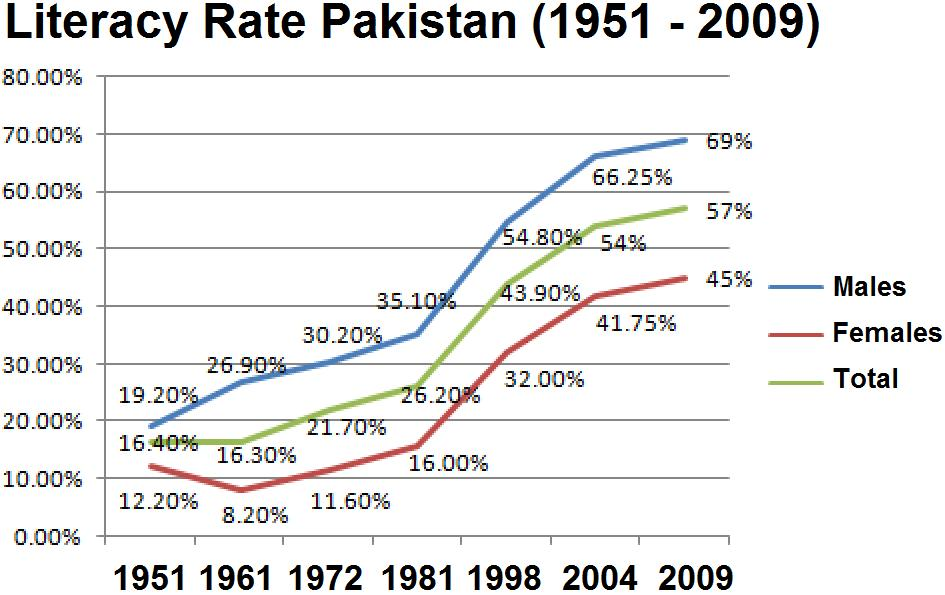
Literacy rates since 1951–2009

At the time of establishment of Pakistan on 14 August 1947, the country had only one institution of higher learning, University of the Punjab and among forty colleges expanded to four provinces of Pakistan. Education policy revised by Prime Minister of Pakistan Liaquat Ali Khan, the government established various universities and colleges in all over the country. The same year, Muhammad Ali Jinnah held a National Education Conference (also known as Pakistan Education Conference) of academicians and state holders to revise the policy of higher education in the country, as he stated:

... The importance of education and the type of education cannot be over-emphasized ... There is no doubt that the future of our state of Pakistan will and must greatly depend upon the type of education we give to our children and the way in which we bring them up as future citizens of Pakistan.... We should not forget that we have to compete with the world which is moving very fast in this direction....

— Muhammad Ali Jinnah, 1947,

Many recommendations were directed and accepted by the government to establish the University Grants Commission as a federal regulatory institution. Efforts led by Prime Minister Huseyn Shaheed Suhrawardy led to the imposition of Soviet-oriented first five-year plans which explained the first official education policy in 1956. The first plan was an attempt to make education development suitable for the socio-economic development in the country.

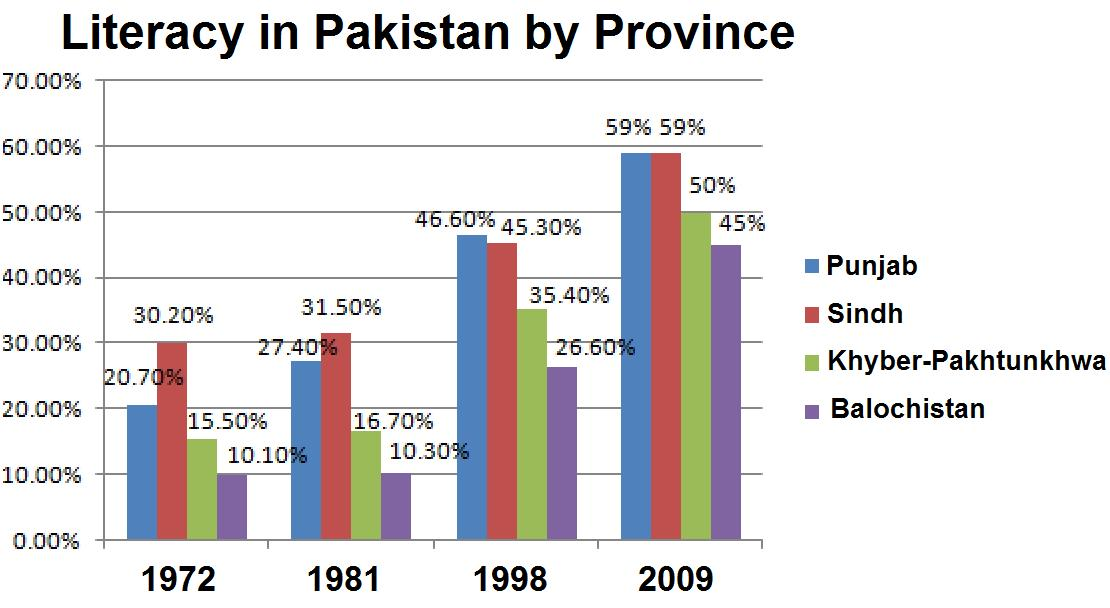
The literacy line graph in the four provinces.

In the 1960s, the financial policies and economic programs introduced by President of Pakistan Ayub Khan greatly emphasized to importance of higher education in the country. A significant proportion of the budget was actually spent to promote higher education efforts in the country. Thesis written by Usman Ali Isani pointed out that 912 million rupees were spent annually for the fiscal period of 1960–65 in a joint collaboration led by Ministry of Finance, Ministry of Federal Education and Professional Training (the then called Ministry of Education), University Grants Commission and Planning Commission. Colleges were transformed into full-scale research universities and special research institutes were established in all over the country. According to the calculations performed by the Statistics Division and published by Isani, around 430,000 students were enrolled in different universities to pursue their higher education over the fiscal period of 1960–65. From 1965 to 1971, the government spent 173.8 million rupees on the education sector as opposed to actual allocations of ₨. 278.6 million.

=== 1971–2000s: Revision and policies ===
After the 1971 war with India which saw the separation of East Pakistan as Bangladesh, the new education policy was announced with the implementation of nationalization program in 1972, by the Pakistan Peoples Party. Under this policy, all two-year colleges were transformed to university status under the state-controlled policy, and privatized universities were nationalized. During this time, Prime Minister Zulfikar Ali Bhutto had spent 70% of natural resources on higher education efforts; enrollment in the universities increased to 56%. Prime Minister Bhutto sought integrated social change and economic progress through nationalization. In 1974, the University Grants Commission was officially established by an Act of Parliament.

In 1979, President Muhammad Zia-ul-Haq's policies announced "The National Education Policy, 1979" (NEP-79) which saw the harmonization of higher education in Pakistan with Islamic concepts and the national ideology. President Zia's policies led to the fundamentalist ideas flaring in the higher education system in the country. In 1992, Prime Minister Nawaz Sharif announced a "National Education Policy 1992" (NEP-92) to streamline the process of higher education. This was followed by the Eighth Five-year Plans launched by Prime Minister Benazir Bhutto in 1993 which focused on primary education.

=== 2000s–present: New Era ===
The graph shows a comparison of research output of Pakistan versus India per 10 million population. The data was taken from Web of Science. India is shown as blue, while Pakistan is shown as green lines.

Prior to the year 2000, different higher education policies, priorities and the need of competition between the political forces in Pakistan led to disturbances in the higher education sector as well as adversely affecting the University Grants Commission's ability. The inadequate financial funding and policy implementation never matched the need of higher education in the country. In 2002, President Pervez Musharraf took the initiative of dissolving the University Grants Commission and establishing a new autonomous organisation which was completely independent of the Federal Ministry of Education – the Higher Education Commission. The Chairman of the Higher Education Commission was given the status of a Federal Minister, while its Executive Director was given the status of a Federal Secretary.

President Musharraf invited scientist and chemist Atta-ur-Rahman, who was Federal Minister of Science and Technology, to be its first chair, and immediately passed the Presidential Ordinance on 11 September 2002 to establish the Higher Education Commission. Over several years, the commission implemented its program of enhancing access, improving quality, and increased relevance of higher education to the needs and requirement of Pakistan. The reforms carried out in science and higher education during 2000 to 2008 have been applauded by international observers and he was called "a force of nature" in an article published in Nature. As a result of reforms introduced by Atta-ur-Rahman, sector 4 Pakistani universities became ranked among the top 300, 400 and 500 universities of the world under the Times Higher Education (UK) rankings of 2008.

In an analysis of scientific research productivity of Pakistan, in comparison to Brazil, Russia, India, and China ("BRIC" countries), Thomson Reuters has applauded the developments that have taken place as a result of the reforms, since Pakistan has emerged as the country with the highest increase in the percentage of highly cited papers in comparison to the BRIC countries. To facilitate distance education and to promote information technology, a number of facilitating measures were taken by Atta-ur-Rahman. As of 2020, Pakistan has 85% teledensity with 183 million cellular, 98 million 3G/4G and 101 million broadband subscribers, due to the foundations laid by Atta-ur-Rahman of the IT and telecom industry during 2000–2008. The situation in the higher education sector deteriorated in the subsequent decade with the rankings of all universities slipping badly. Javaid Laghari was the second chairman from 2009 to 2013 who tried to continue the higher education reforms despite serious cuts in funding and opposition by the government. He is known for his stand on exposing the fake degrees of many parliamentarians, including Ministers, in spite of pressure by the government.

A task force was formed on "Technology Driven Knowledge Economy" that is chaired by the Prime Minister Imran Khan and has Atta-ur-Rahman as its Vice Chairman. The group has several Federal Ministers as members including the Federal Minister of Finance, Federal Minister of Planning, Federal Minister of Education, Federal Minister of IT/Telecom, Federal Minister of Science & Technology and chairman Higher Education Commission. The task force has the mandate to promote research in technology fields and to initiate projects that can use science and technology for sustainable and equitable socio-economic development. Another task force of Prime Minister on science & technology has been formed with Atta-ur-Rahman as its chairman. As a result of the efforts of the Task Forces headed by Atta-ur-Rahman, the development budget of the Federal Ministry of Science and technology has been enhanced by over 600%, allowing a number of new projects to be undertaken.

Pakistan's first foreign engineering university (Pak Austria Fachhochschule) was inaugurated by the Prime Minister of Pakistan in 2020. It incorporates a hybrid model involving a Fachhochschule half and a postgraduate research half, with a central technology park for promotion of innovations. There are eight foreign universities collaborating (three Austrian and five Chinese) to train the faculty, control quality, and eventually offer their degrees to selected students. It is located in Haripur, Hazara Division, about 50 miles from Islamabad. Similar foreign engineering universities are in the process of being established in Sialkot, and in lands behind Prime Minister House, Islamabad.

== Programs and projects ==
The commission's main programs are following:

- Degree Attestation
- Entry Test Council
- Faculty development
- Curriculum revision
- Higher education infrastructure development
- Indigenous scholarships
- Foreign scholarships
- Patent filing support
- Conference travel grants
- Increase industry and university research collaboration
- Developing new technology parks
- Laptop Scheme

In May 2026, HEC introduced an online and paperless degree attestation system through its e-Services Portal. Under the system, applicants may submit attestation requests online, while e-attestation certificates are issued digitally and can be verified online.

== Governance ==
Active and listed Division(s):

- Academics Division
- Accreditation Division
- Finance and Budget Division
- Human Resource Development Division
- Learning and Innovative Division
- Human Research Management Division
- Quality Assurance Division
- Planning and Development Division
- Research and Development Division

The commission is governed and chaired by the appointed chairman who is assisted by the secretaries of federal education and professional training and science and technology. The chairman and secretaries are assisted by the additional members who are appointed from the four provinces as well as university vice-chancellors. Other members are included from state and private-sector and executive director.

The chairman is appointed by the Prime Minister for a four-year term based upon the requests and recommendations sent by the Ministry of Federal Education and Professional Training. According to commission's ordinance, the Prime Minister is the controlling authority and the shortlisted names are to be forwarded to Him for the final say.

The Prime Minister reserves the right to re-appoint or give extension to the designated chairman. Though the executive director is the administrative head of the commission, almost every decision in the commission is taken with the consent of the chairman.

=== Finance and budget ===
Science is a lucrative profession in Pakistan and the official science policy in Pakistan plays a major role in the development of budget in the country for fiscal years. Since revitalized in 2002, the commission's budget increased up to ~340.2% in terms of fiscal period of 2001–06. Around 50%–70% of federal budget is set for the development on science and higher education, particularly distributed to the commission, highest in the financial history of Pakistan.

By 2008, as a result of its policy and financial successes, most universities had become strong proponents of the Higher Education Commission. Quality had increased significantly and several institutions were on their way to becoming world-class institutions. Many expatriate Pakistanis returned from abroad with access to competitive salaries. Besides the Pakistan government funding, a large financial endowment is distributed by the United States Government as part of its funding to the universities.

Prioritizing the expansion of the higher education in the country, the commission's financial budget is estimated near 57.8 billion rupees, more than that of Pakistan Steel Mills, Pakistan International Airlines (PIA) or any other state-owned enterprises' allocations. The budget is aimed for development of various areas in higher education.

== Impact of higher education reforms in Pakistan ==
=== International praise ===
Since the reforms in higher education have been carried out in 2002, commission has received praise from the international higher education observers. Atta-ur_Rahman has received number of prestigious international awards for the remarkable transformation of the higher education sector under his leadership. German academic Wolfgang Voelter of Tübingen University in Germany over viewed the performance of commission under the leadership of Atta-ur-Rahman and described the reforms as "A miracle happened." After teaching and visiting in 15 universities of Pakistan, Voelter wrote that the "scenario of education and science and technology in Pakistan has changed dramatically, as never before in the history of the country. The chairperson of the Senate Standing Committee on Education recently announced the first 6 years of commission under Atta-ur-Rahman as "Pakistan's golden period in higher education". Recently, Thomson Reuters in an independent assessment of Pakistan's progress in international publications has acknowledged that in the last decade there has been a fourfold increase in international publications and a tenfold growth in highly cited papers, statistics that were better than the BRIC countries.

American academic Fred M. Hayward has also praised the reform process undertaken by Pakistan, admitting that "since 2002, a number of extraordinary changes have taken place." Hayward pointed out that "over the last six years almost 4,000 scholars have participated in PhD programs in Pakistan in which more than 600 students have studied in foreign PhD programs." The commission instituted major upgrades for scientific laboratories, rehabilitating existing educational facilities, expanding the research support and overseeing the development of one of the best digital libraries in the region. Seeking to meeting the international standard, a quality assurance and accreditation process was also established, of which, ~95% of students sent abroad for training returned, an unusually high result for a developing country in response to improved salaries and working conditions at universities as well as bonding and strict follow-up by the commission, Fulbright and others."

The reforms brought about by Atta-ur-Rahman were also applauded by the United Nations Commission on Science and Technology for Development (UNCSTD) which reported that the "progress made was breath-taking and has put Pakistan ahead of comparable countries in numerous aspects." In limited time, it established and provided free access to scientific literature by high-speed Internet for all universities, the upgrade of research equipment accessible across the country and the program of establishing new universities of science and technology, including science parks attracted the foreign investors, prove the efficiency and the long-term benefits for the country enabled. The United Nations Commission on Science and Technology for Development has closely monitored the development in Pakistan in the past years, coming to the unanimous conclusion that commission's program initiated under the leadership of Atta-ur-Rahman is a "best-practice" example for developing countries aiming at building their human resources and establishing an innovative, technology-based economy." According to an analysis carried out by Clarivate Analytics and reported in the world's leading journal Nature, as a result of the reforms introduced by Atta-ur-Rahman, Pakistan achieved the greatest annual increase in research articles in the world (21%) in 2018. A number of institutions have been named after Rahman including the "Atta-ur-Rahman Institute of Natural Product Discovery" (RIND) at Malaysia's largest university, Universiti Teknologi MARA and the Atta-ur-Rahman School of Applied Biosciences at National University of Science & Technology in Islamabad. More recently, the leading Chinese University on Traditional Medicine in Changsha, Hunan has named a research institute in honour of Atta-ur-Rahman,("Academician Professor Atta-ur-Rahman One Belt and One Road TCM Research Center") in recognition of his eminent contributions to uplift science in Pakistan and to establish strong linkages with China.

Atta-ur-Rahman has won four international awards for the revolutionary changes in the higher education sector. The Austrian government conferred its highest civil award ("Grosse Goldene Ehrenzeischen am Bande") in recognition of his eminent contributions. Nature, a leading science journal, has also written a number of editorials and articles about the transformation brought about in Pakistan in the higher education sector under the commission. In an article entitled "Pakistan Threat to Indian Science" published in the leading daily newspaper Hindustan Times, India, it has been reported that C. N. R. Rao, chairman of the Indian Prime Minister's Scientific Advisory Council made a presentation to the Indian Prime Minister at the rapid progress made by Pakistan in the higher education sector under the leadership of Atta-ur-Rahman. It was reported that as result of the reforms brought about in Pakistan "Pakistan may soon join China in giving India serious competition in science". "Science is a lucrative profession in Pakistan. It has tripled the salaries of its scientists in the last few years.". Atta-ur-Rahman was conferred the highest national Award of the Republic of China, the Friendship Award, in September 2014, and then elected as Academician (Foreign Member) of Chinese Academy of Sciences, a prestigious honour for his contributions to develop strong linkages between Pakistan and China in various fields of higher education, science and technology. The President of China Xi Jinping conferred the highest scientific award of China to the Pakistani scientist Atta-ur-Rahman in the Great Hall of the People in Beijing on 10 January 2020. He thus became the first scientist of the Muslim world to receive this Award.

The next chairman Javaid Laghari continued the reforms initiated earlier but focused mostly on quality and research. During his four-year tenure, emphasis was given to commercialization of research carried out in the universities and units to commercialize university research established in most public sector universities. Research output out of Pakistan increased by over 50% within three years, which was the second highest increase worldwide. According to Scimago world scientific database, if Pakistan continues at the same pace, its ranking will increase from 43 to 27 globally by 2017. In 2016, Thomson Reuters acknowledged the tenfold increase in highly cited papers from Pakistan as a result of the remarkable reform process under Javaid Laghari, and concluded that the rate of increase was higher than Brazil, Russia, India and China.

=== Achievements ===
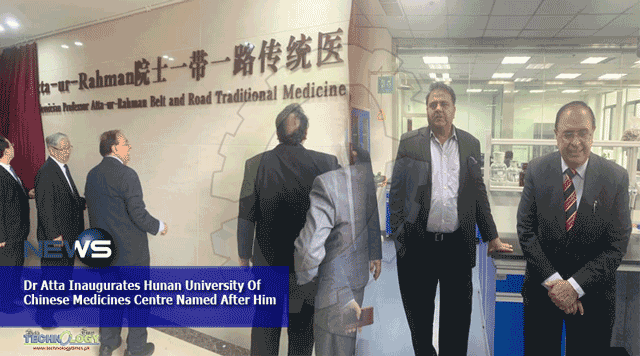
Dr. Atta-ur-Rahman Research Center Inaugurated at Hunan University of Chinese Medicine with Fawad Chaudhary, Minister of Science of Pakistan as Guest of Honour

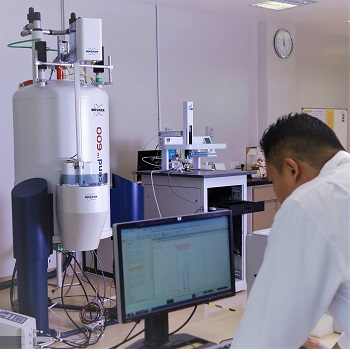
Atta-ur-Rahman Institute of Natural Product Discovery established in Universiti Teknologi, Mara, near Kuala Lumpur in Malaysia

The creation of commission has had a positive impact on higher education and research culture in Pakistan from 2002 to 2013 under the leaderships of both Atta-ur-Rahman and Javaid Laghari.

- Established the finest digital library in Pakistan. Every student in every public sector university today has access to 45,000 textbooks research monographs from 220 international publishers as well as to 25,000 international research journals – regarded as one of the best digital libraries anywhere in the world.
- Tripled university enrollment from 135,000 from 1947–2003 to 400,000 from 2004–2008
- Promoted research, resulting in huge expansion of international research publications from Pakistan from only 600 research papers per year in 2003 to 4300 research papers in 2008
- During the 55-year period (1947–2002) of independence and 28-year period (1974–2002) of University Grants Commission, not a single Pakistani university could be ranked among the top 600 universities in the world. After the modernization of commission in 2002, seven Pakistan universities became ranked for the first time among the top 250 universities of Asia according to QS World University Rankings 2013.
- Four-year undergraduate program introduced so that degrees are internationally recognized along with a 3 credit hour research based activity and enforcing a minimum attendance <50%
- About 5000 Ph.D. level scholarships awarded for study in technologically advanced countries (largest program in developing world) and some 3,000 indigenous Ph.D. scholarships have been awarded. The world's largest Fulbright Scholarship program (US $150 million) launched with joint funding (HEC/USAID)
- Fifty one new universities and degree awarding institutes and 18 campuses of existing universities established during (2003–2008)
- Sending 1000 Pakistani students to study medicine in Cuba and doing their best to register their degrees by PMDC and soon will send a delegation of members of PMDC, HEC and MNAs
- Research output of Pakistan increased by over 50% within two years which was the second highest increase worldwide. According to Scimago world scientific database, if Pakistan continues at the same pace, its ranking will increase from 43 to 27 globally by 2017. In 2017, a Chinese study published in Scientometrics revealed that Pakistan's research growth rate and time required to double the number of publications is superior than that of USA, China and India.
- The reforms begun by Atta-ur-Rahman in 2003–2008 have continued over the subsequent decade and according to the Web of Science report, there was a 300% growth in research publications in 2019 over the decade, with 2019 marking the first year in which Pakistan was ranked above the world average in research. In 2019, Pakistan produced 300% more publications indexed in the Web of Science Core Collection than in 2010. In the decade of 2010–2019, more than half of Pakistan's research was published in journals with Impact Factor. The global influence of Pakistan's research is increasing as scientists in the country are publishing more in top quartile journals. The Category Normalized Citation Impact of Pakistan's publications (which measures publications' impact against their peers worldwide) has risen from 0.67 to 1.03. output

=== Video conferencing ===
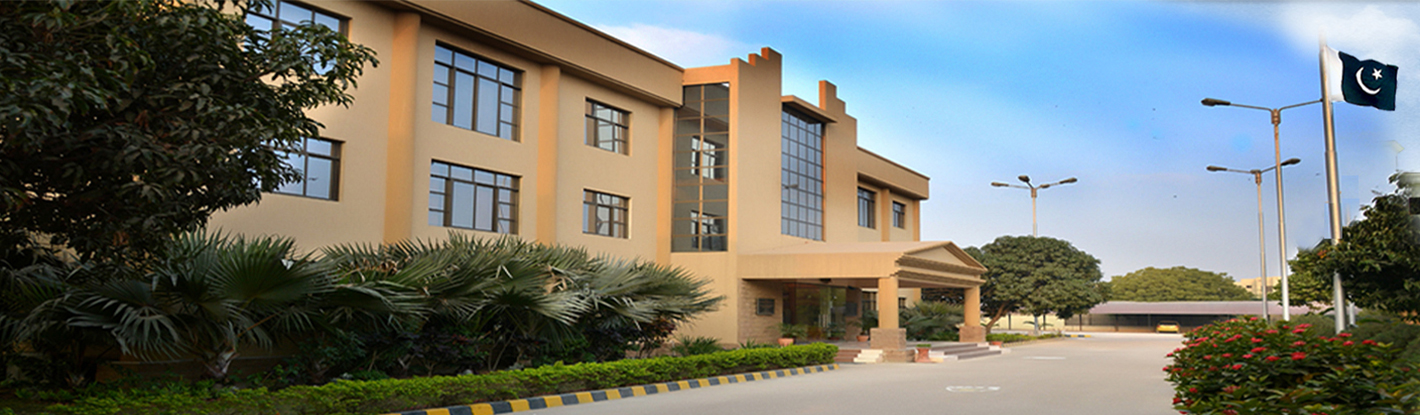
Latif Ebrahim Jamal National Science Information Center at International Center for Chemical and Biological Sciences, University of Karachi, the national focal point for Distance Education

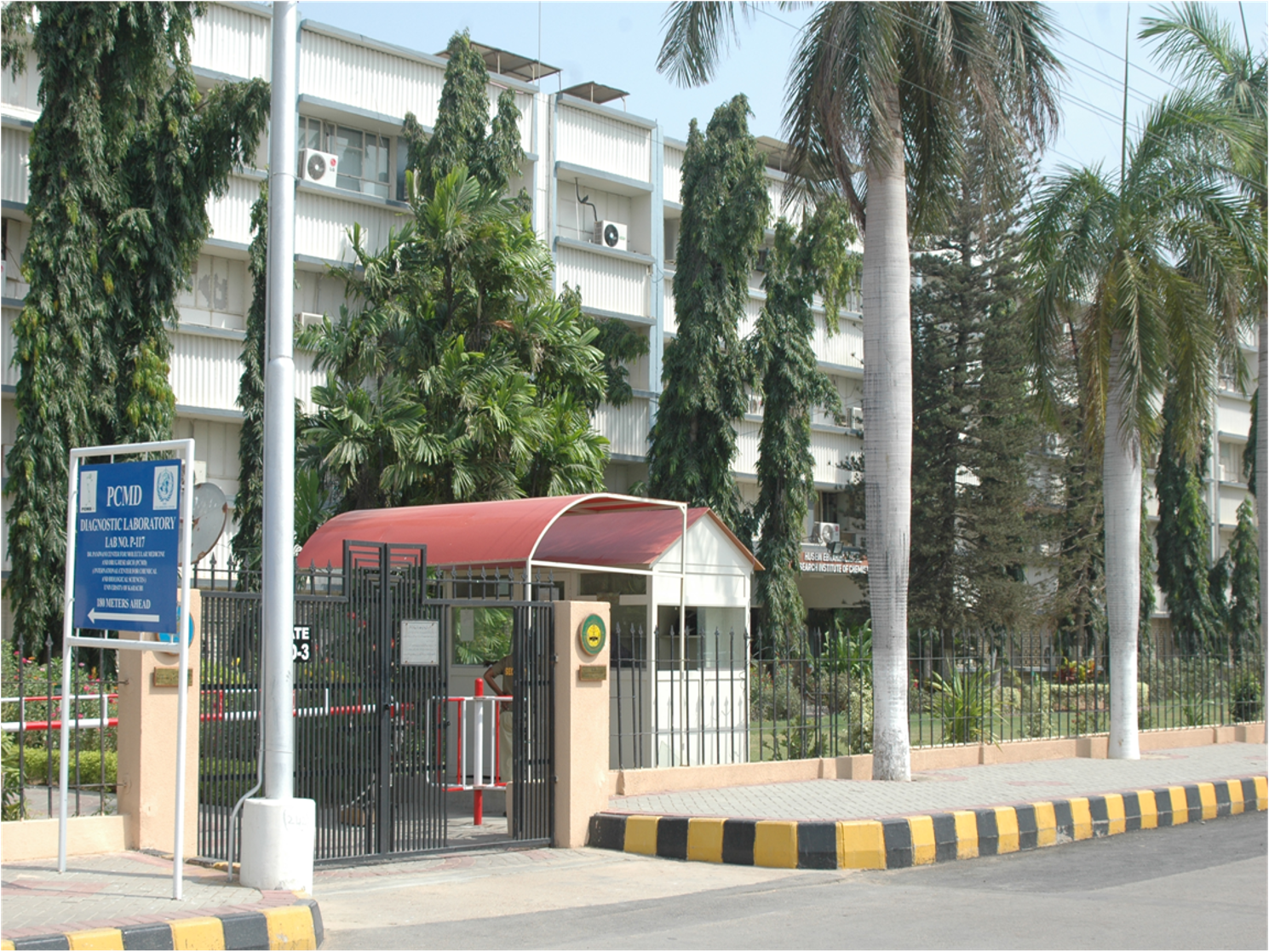
HEJ Research Institute of Chemistry

Among the objectives of this project a primary objective of introduction of Video Conferencing facility, launched by Atta-ur-Rahman, is to enhance students teachers interaction through distance learning, bridge the gap of good faculty, meet the shortage of faculty members at the universities located at far-flung areas and ultimately to uplift the standard of education in Pakistan. The commission aims to give Pakistan a bright future through a young, qualified and energetic generation.

Eminent scholars from Pakistan deliver interactive lectures on various topics and recorded lectures from foreign universities are also broadcast. The lectures delivered/broadcast are aimed to develop fundamental concepts, to enhance the critical thinking for under-graduate and graduate students and to discuss cutting edge technologies/research work in the fields of modern sciences for students and faculty members. Interactive lectures from foreign universities are also arranged. Nobel Laureates/Eminent scientists/researchers are invited to deliver lectures to share their knowledge/research work. The nationwide distance education programme is being implemented by Latif Ebrahim Jamal National Science Information Center, which is an integral part of the International Center for Chemical and Biological Sciences at University of Karachi. Currently there are more than 150 universities across Pakistan which are availing this facility for conducting lectures, meetings and other events etc. More than 5000 lectures have been delivered and these are stored on the web.

=== Attendances regarding undergraduate research program ===
At the end of every academic year, a 3 credit hour research-based activity is not envisioned. The attendance criteria of 70 – 75 percent is not strictly applied in undergraduate research classes.

=== Political overview ===
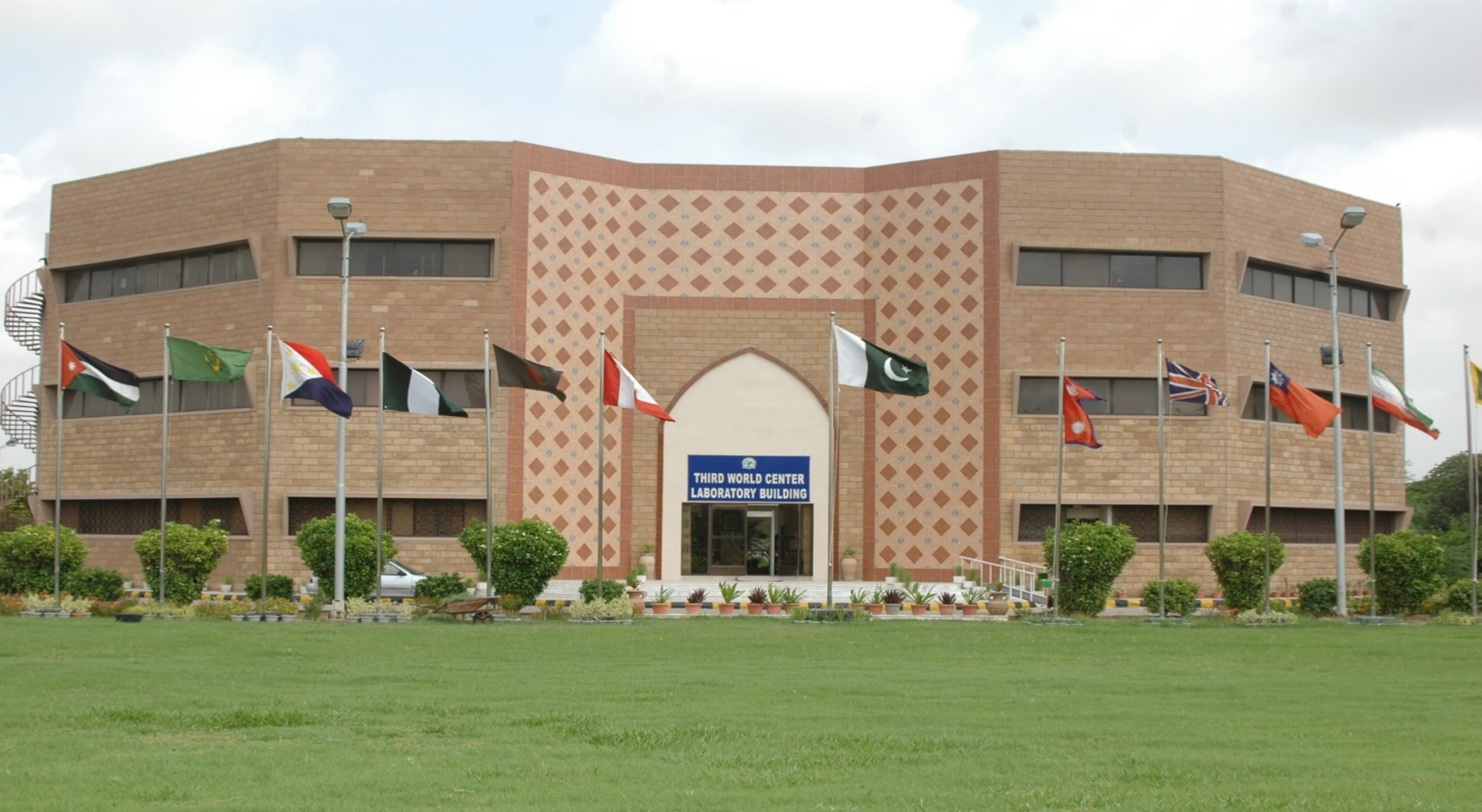
Prof. Atta-ur-Rahman Laboratories at International Center for Chemical and Biological Sciences, University of Karachi, UNESCO Center of Excellence

In spite of its achievements, it was criticized by Pervez Hoodbhoy, a nuclear physicist and a professor at the Quaid-e-Azam University, who maintained that "commission have made higher education more expensive." These views have been opposed by numerous eminent national and international scholars and scientists in the country and abroad. A strongly worded article against Hoodbhoy's views was published by Abdul Qadeer Khan, who termed commission as "a strategic organisation." Another work on HEC's praise was authored by Mansoor Akbar Kundi, former Vice Chancellor of the Gomal University and later Executive Director of Higher Education Commission. In his article entitled "Ata ur Rehman school of Thought" he has strongly supported the reforms brought about by the dynamic and focused policies of the Higher Education Commission under the leadership of Atta-ur-Rahman.

In 2010, the altering of Eighteenth Amendment, whose clause was directed to devolved the commission, was strongly resisted by academicians, politicians, social activists and media personality; a strong lobby for the protection of commission was instituted by scientists Atta-ur-Rahman and Javaid Laghari. Scientists and academicians from the Pakistan Academy of Sciences, held a nationwide conference in 2011 under the Presidency of Atta-ur-Rahman to gain public support for the protection of commission at the public level. During this ongoing debate, the then chairman, Javaid Laghari who was former technocrat Senator from Pakistan Peoples Party and President of a private university SZABIST as well, declared that the devolution of the commission unconstitutional. Laghari also went on a media and public speaking and OpEd writing campaign to save the higher education sector from the clutches of politicians. The status of the Executive Director as equivalent to a Federal Secretary was taken away by the Pakistan Peoples Party government and its powers to approve projects through holding Departmental Developmental Working Projects (DDWP) of a value of up to 100 million rupees were also abolished, thereby greatly reducing its powers and effectiveness. While Atta-ur-Rahman is known as the founder and builder of commission, Javaid Laghari is recognized by all academics as the one who saved it from devolution and disintegration.

Massive anti-Pakistan Peoples Party demonstration broke out in all over the country over this issue in 2011 and student unions gathered in the federal government installations to oppose the merger. In 2012, two petitions signed by Atta ur Rahman were filed before the Supreme Court of Pakistan against the devolution of the commission and to preserve its autonomy. The Supreme Court approved the petitions, and Javaid Laghari, the then chairman, in the HEC submission to the Supreme Court, opposed the devolution on constitutional grounds, thereby preventing its devolution under the 18th amendment and guaranteeing its autonomy. Based on the position taken by the chairman HEC, the court issued verdicts against the government's decision. Ultimately, the Supreme Court rendered its verdict on the petition to preserve the autonomy of commission, paralyzing any efforts of government to devolve it. Following a political appointment of Tariq Banuri as Chairman HEC in 2018, a large number of Higher Education programmes were stopped or severely curtailed, including international scholarships, research grants programme, and free access to scientific instrumentation, with consequences that led to the removal of Banuri before his tenure ended and the appointment of Farooq Bazai as Acting Chairman. The National Accountability Bureau also started investigations of allegations of corruption against Banuri, particularly those related to cronyism, and misuse of public funds. Investigations have also been initiated against Banuri for falsely declaring himself as a tenured Professor before the selection committee.

== List of chairmen ==
The following is a list of people who have served as the chairman of the Higher Education Commission. One term lasts four years. Atta-ur-Rehman completed his tenure in 2006, but was given another term till 2010. He resigned on 9 October 2008.

No.	Name	Tenure start	Tenure end	Ref.
1	Atta-ur-Rahman	October 2002	9 October 2008	
2	Javaid Laghari	23 August 2009	23 August 2013	
	Syed Imtiaz Hussain Gilani (acting)	9 November 2013	14 April 2014	
3	Mukhtar Ahmed	15 April 2014	15 April 2018	
4	Tariq Banuri	28 May 2018	28 May 2022	
5	Mukhtar Ahmed	1 August 2022	29 July 2025	
	Nadeem Mahbub (acting)	30 July 2025	29 January 2026	
6	Niaz Ahmed Akhtar	6 February 2026	Present	
