= Threat Matrix (database) =

Military doctrine of Pakistan

Pakistan's location within Asia.

The Threat Matrix is an intelligence-based measure and thorough assessments database program that Pakistani government officials and military science circles use in evaluating perceived external and internal threats that challenge the national security of Pakistan. Development began in 2011 under the government of Prime minister Yousaf Raza Gillani. The program identifies the military's operational priorities and goes beyond in comprehensively describing both existential and non-existential threats to the country. The Threat Matrix program is viewed to become a permanent fixture of the national security policy of Pakistan.

The database's comprehensive existence was revealed by political scientist Farrukh Saleem in his work published in The News International in 2013, but it was earlier mentioned by the ISPR in a press briefing given to media. In his published thesis Saleem critically opined that the source of all existential threats has always been a state actor(s), not a non-state on, the armed forces.

== Program overview ==
=== Conventional threats vs. sub-conventional threats ===
"Sub-conventional threat is a reality and is a part of a threat matrix faced by our country. But it doesn't mean that the conventional threat has receded."

— Maj. Gen. Asim Saleem Bajwa, director-general of the Inter-Services Public Relations (Express Tribune, January 3, 2013).

The Threat Matrix has two defined dimensions: conventional threats and sub-conventional threats. Conventional threats are external threats to national security from outside the country, and sub-conventional threats refer to internal threats to national security from within the country. In January 2013, Major-General Asif Salim of the Inter-Services Public Relations (ISPR) briefed the news media on new recent studies conducted by Pakistan military.

According to the ISPR, the armed forces were programmed for conventional warfare but the current situation necessitated change, as the Forces fighting on the front-line in the tribal regions are now being program according to the requirements of sub-conventional warfare. In an interview military scientist, Talat Masood noted that before the new doctrine, India was viewed as "No. 1 enemy", but for the first time, it has been realised that Pakistan faces the real threat from within, a threat that is concentrated in areas along western borders. The conflict in the northwest is closely tied to the War in Afghanistan, with factors like militant insurgency and future US pullout in Afghanistan having an intertwined effect on the conflict in Pakistan. According to Lieutenant-General Khalid Rabbani, commander of the XI Corps in Peshawar, the withdrawal of foreign combat troops from Afghanistan since 2014 may trigger some challenging ramifications for Pakistan in terms of the threat matrix of Afghanistan: "If they are leaving and giving a notion of success to the Taliban of Afghanistan, this notion of success may have a snowballing effect on to the threat matrix of Afghanistan."

Along with the challenges posed at the western front, India still retains an important focus in threat assessments and Pakistan's civil-military foreign policy doctrine. According to an Express Tribune editorial, the potential threat of arch-rival India in the east has an effect on the state's threat matrix on the western front too: "The dwindling capacity of the state to cope with terrorism is owed to Pakistan's 'vigilance' on the eastern border from where Pakistan's static 'threat matrix' expects India to attack and occupy Pakistan because it never accepted the creation of Pakistan." Harsh V. Pant of Outlook India thinks that Pakistan's fast-growing nuclear arsenal, expanding at a greater rate than India's. during a charged sociopolitical atmosphere in the country is rapidly changing the dynamics of the nuclear matrix of the region and tactically underscores the Pakistani military establishment's "India-centric threat matrix."

In 2016, the Pakistan Navy revealed it was developing a "maritime doctrine" in response to an evolving conventional and subconventional threat matrix in the region of the Indian Ocean. The doctrine would aim to protect Pakistan's maritime interests in the region.

=== Debates and rational thesis ===
According to J. Berkshire Miller of The Diplomat, "The military establishment in Pakistan, meanwhile, still views its Threat Matrix through an India-centric lens—Pakistan genuinely believes, rightly or wrongly, that India continues to work aggressively against its strategic interests through bribery and espionage in Afghanistan."

In his comprehensive thesis, Minimum Deterrence: Pakistan's Dilemma, published at the Royal United Services Institute (RUSI) by the nuclear strategist and theorist Brigadier-General (retired) Feroz Hassan Khan states that "Pakistan's Threat Matrix dramatically changed" after the events of the 1971 war and India's nuclear bomb test in 1974. The country's threat perception became "dominated by the twin threat of India's conventional force superiority and nuclear weapons capability," and "the acquisition of nuclear weapons hence became Pakistan's highest national security objective, with unanimity across all parts of the political spectrum. This was augmented by the strong perception that outside powers could not be relied upon in moments of crisis and war."

The term also has economic connotations. For instance, US Secretary of State Hillary Clinton outlined the downturn of the 2008 financial crisis and its effect on Pakistan, especially in the context of the war against militancy: "this economic crisis, left unresolved, will create massive unemployment. It will upend governments, it will, unfortunately, breed instability.... I appreciated putting that into the context of the Threat Matrix, because look at Pakistan, a country that we know has to be stabilized for the benefit of not only South Asia, but beyond."

=== Military exercise and programming ===
In June 2013, the Pakistan Armed Forces started a joint-war game exercise, codenamed Azm-i-Nau IV, in which the aim was to update the military's "readiness strategy for dealing with the complex security threat environment." The objective of the exercise was to assess military tactics, procedures and techniques in the event of an emerging threat environment, and explore joint operations strategies in response to combating the threat with all three branches of the military: the Army, Air Force and Navy.

The exercise took place amid renewed fears of the situation in Afghanistan post-withdrawal of coalition forces in 2014 as well as the "continuing internal threat of terrorism and India's growing regional ambitions." The newspaper Dawn reported: "A senior military official said [the] war games were meant for coming up with a comprehensive response to all threats. He explained that the threat matrix was evolving and transforming. It includes both the internal challenge from terror groups of various shades and the conventional threat of external aggression."

From 2009, the Azm-i-Nau exercises are aimed at preempting India's Cold Start doctrine and improving a joint armed forces response to any conventional threat.

== Scope ==
In a work published by Dr. Farrukh Saleem, the current Threat Matrix has five major elements: military; nuclear; terrorism; cyber and economic. According to Saleem, the first two threats, the military and the nuclear, are existential in nature, as they threaten the "very basis of the state and its physical existence." Existential threats essentially threaten the "unity, demography and integrity" of a nation-state, Pakistan. The last three threats, terrorism, cyber and economic, are non-existential in nature because they are asymmetric in sense between belligerents that possess "unequal military resources and the weaker opponent uses unconventional weapons and tactics to exploit the vulnerabilities of the enemy."

The government and military science officials describing the Threat Matrix program as legally and morally sound when a recent joint military exercises were conducted to rapidly respond to the threat matrix, which falls in the category of low-intensity conflict being confronted in some areas of the country.

Soon after the revelation of the program to international media by the ISPR, the international media quoted the change of policy as in what is being seen as a "paradigm shift" in the country's policy.

However, Pakistani political science scholar, Ghazi Salahuddin, remains uncertain if this can be described as a "paradigm shift."

== See also ==
- Bleed India with a Thousand Cuts
- Foreign policy of Pakistan
