= 2012–13 Pakistan federal budget =

Pakistani Federal Budget

2012-13 Federal Budget
- Emblem of Pakistan
- Submitted: 1 June 2012
- Submitted by: Abdul Hafeez Shaikh
- Submitted to: National Assembly
- Country: Pakistan
- Website: Ministry of Finance

The Pakistan federal budget of Fiscal year of 2012–2013 was the federal budget of Pakistan for the fiscal year beginning from 1 July 2012 and ending on 30 June 2013.

The budget was formally presented on 1 June 2012 by Finance Minister Dr. Abdul Hafeez Sheikh during a National Assembly session. The budget was a milestone in the context that this was the first time in the history of the country that a democratically elected government presented its fifth budget during its tenure. Work on budget and recommendation on spending request was completed by Hafeez Sheikh to the government of the Pakistan Peoples Party with the cabinet being led by Prime Minister Yousaf Raza Gillani.

The budget outlay was totaled at an estimated at ₨. 3.203 trillion. Notable proposals in the budget included creating one hundred thousand jobs in the economy, addressing the energy crisis, and the construction of dams and water infrastructure. The Ministry of Finance also launched the Economic Survey of Pakistan in the run-up to the budget — "a pre-budget document highlighting the overall performance of the economy during the out-going fiscal year." The survey showed that the economy registered a 3.7% growth in GDP in the outgoing fiscal year, compared to the previous year's target of 4.2%.

== See also ==
- 2014 Pakistan federal budget, budget for the fiscal year 2013—2014.
