= Javaid Laghari =

Pakistani politician

Javaid Leghari
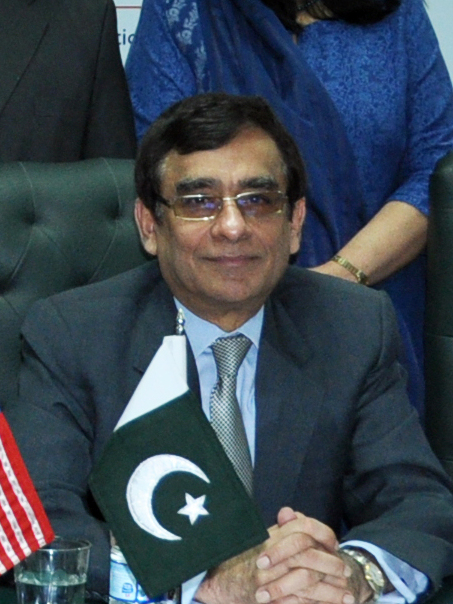

Chairman of the Higher Education Commission
- In office 14 August 2009 – Incumbent
- President: Asif Ali Zardari
- Prime Minister: Yousaf Raza Gillani
- Preceded by: Atta-ur-Rehman

Pakistan Senator to the Senate Secretariat
- In office 23 March 2006 – 11 March 2009
- President: General Pervez Musharraf; Asif Ali Zardari
- Prime Minister: Shaukat Aziz; Yousaf Raza Gillani

6th Science Adviser to the Prime minister Secretariat
- In office 1 August 1993 – 5 November 1996
- President: Wasim Sajjad; Farooq Leghari
- Prime Minister: Benazir Bhutto
- Preceded by: Munir Ahmad Khan
- Succeeded by: Ishfaq Ahmad

Personal details
- Born: 1960 (age 65–66) Hyderabad, Pakistan
- Party: Pakistan People's Party
- Spouse: Shahida Pari Laghari
- Children: Zaid Laghari; Asad Laghari
- Education: University of Sindh (BS); Middle East Technical University (MS)
- Awards: Tamgha-e-Imtiaz (1999); IEEE Leadership Award (1994)
- Fields: Electrical engineering

Javaid Laghari, TI (Urdu: جاويد لغارى; born 1960) is a Pakistani American academic, scientist, and politician who has served several prominent positions, including as Senator and the Chairperson of the Higher Education Commission of Pakistan from August 2009 to August 2013 with the status of a Federal Minister. He has also contributed to scientific research, higher education, and policy development both in Pakistan and internationally.

== Academic and Research Career ==
Laghari began his academic career as a tenured full Professor of Electrical and Computer Engineering at the State University of New York (SUNY) at Buffalo. He served as Director of Graduate Studies and as Director of the NASA and Department of Defense funded Space Power Institute. During his tenure at SUNY Buffalo, he secured over $5 million in research funding and conducted sponsored research for organizations including NASA, the US Air Force Office of Scientific Research (AFOSR), the Office of Naval Research (ONR), the Naval Research Lab (NRL) and Boeing Aerospace Company. His research focused on high-energy storage and pulsed power devices and their applications in space and other advanced technologies.

Laghari participated in NATO Advanced Study Institutes in the United Kingdom (1991) and Italy (1983), events reserved for the top 100 scientists from NATO countries. He also served as Chairman of the 1992 IEEE International Conference on High Voltage Engineering and contributed to the IEEE Technical Standards Committee on Radiation Effects.

== Leadership in Higher Education ==
Laghari was the founding President and Project Director of SZABIST, a leading private university in Pakistan with multiple campuses including one in Dubai. He later served as Chairperson of the Higher Education Commission (HEC) of Pakistan with the status of Federal Minister.

He has delivered over 58 keynote lectures at international institutions, including The Clinton School of Public Service, the Brookings Institution, and the School of Advanced International Studies (SAIS). He has also given numerous invited lectures, Chief Guest addresses, and media interviews.

== Political career ==
Laghari served as a Senator and was closely associated with former Prime Minister Benazir Bhutto. He contributed to the Pakistan People’s Party (PPP) as co-author of the party's election manifesto, Deputy Coordinator, Vice Chairman of the Central Policy Planning Committee, Co-Chairman of the Task Force on Manifesto Implementation, and Chairman of the Energy and Power Committee.

== Professional and Advisory Roles ==
Laghari has served as Coordinator General of COMSTECH, the OIC Ministerial Standing Committee on Scientific and Technology Cooperation. He has held advisory roles in the United States and globally, including President of the American Skills Evaluation Institute (ASEI), President of the Forum for Dialogue and Diplomacy (FDD), and Chairperson of the Trust for Innovation, Entrepreneurship and Knowledge (TIEK) in Houston, Texas.

== Publications and Writing ==
Laghari has published over 650 papers, 8+ books, and numerous op-eds and articles in leading newspapers and magazines. His publications cover topics in leadership, higher education, science fiction, and thrillers. Notable works include the fiction-thrillers Ifrit and Solomon’s Demon, and his upcoming science fiction novel God Chip.

== Awards and Recognition ==
Laghari is a Senior Member of the ACM and IEEE, and a member of the New York Academy of Sciences. He has received several honors, including the Distinguished Leadership Award (1987), IEEE Award for Leadership and Dedicated Services (1994), and the national award Tamgha-e-Imtiaz (1998). He is listed in American Men and Women of Science, Who’s Who in Science and Engineering, Who’s Who in the East, Who’s Who in America, and Who’s Who in the World.

== Publications ==
=== Books ===
- Solomon’s Dream, January 2023, Amazon Publishing, ISBN 979-83-742-07-330
- Solomon's Magic, November 2022, Amazon Publishing, ISBN 979-83-659-20-354
- Solomon's Demon, August 2022, Amazon Publishing, ISBN 979-884-8052-107
- Challenges in Higher Education, June 2021, Amazon Publishing, ISBN 979-851-8200-623
- Ifrit, January 2019, Austin Macauley, ISBN 978-1528906623
- Reflections on Benazir Bhutto, SZABIST Publication, ISBN 978-969-8666-13-2, February 2008.
- Leaders of Pakistan, SZABIST Publication, ISBN 978-969-8666-14-9, August 2009.
- The Wizardry of Leadership, Paramount Publishing, ISBN 978-969-494-846-1, September 2011.
- Dielectric Films for High Temperature High Voltage Power Electronics, Materials for Electronic Packaging, by J. R. Laghari and edited by Deborah D. L. Chung, Butterworth Publishers, 1994.

=== Selected research papers and patents ===
- Surface Flashover of Spacers in Compressed Gas Insulated Systems, J. R. Laghari and A. H. Qureshi, IEEE Transactions on Electrical Insulation, Vol. EI-16, No. 5, 1981,
- A Review of Particle-Contaminated Gas Breakdown, J. R. Laghari and A. H. Qureshi, "IEEE Transactions on Electrical Insulation, Vol. EI-16, No. 5, 1981, pp. 388–398.
- Spacer Flashover in Compressed Gases, J. R. Laghari, IEEE Transactions on Electrical Insulation, Vol. EI-20, vol. No. 1.
- Testing and Evaluation of Insulating Films: Part I: Description of Test Facilities at the University at Buffalo, J. R. Laghari, IEEE Electrical Insulation, Vol. 2, No.6, 1986.
- Testing and Evaluation of Insulating Films: Part II: Test Results using Facilities at the University at Buffalo, J. R. Laghari, IEEE Electrical Insulation, Vol. 2, No. 6, 1986.
- A Review of ac and Pulse Capacitor Technology, J. R. Laghari, Applied Physics Communications, Vol. 6, No. 2, 1986.
- On the Design of Field-Controlled Multi-Layer Foil Insulation, S. Cygan and J. R. Laghari, IEEE Transactions on Electrical Insulation, Vol. EI-22, No. 1, 1987, pp. 107–108.
- Multifactor Stress Aging of Dielectrics", J. R. Laghari, Applied Physics Communications, Vol. 7, No. 1, 1987.
- Repetitive Phenomena in Dielectics M. Treanor, J. R. Laghari and A. K. Hyder, IEEE Transactions on Electrical Insulation, Vol. EI-22, No. 4, 1987, pp. 517–522.
- Dependence of Electrical Strength on Thickness, Area and Volume of Polypropylene", S. Cygan and J. R. Laghari, IEEE Transactions on Electrical Insulation, Vol. EI-22, No. 6, 1987.

Government offices
Preceded by Munir A. Khan	Science Advisor to the Prime Minister's Secretariat; 1 August 1993 – 5 November 1996	Succeeded by Ishfaq Ahmad
