= Raisman Program =

Pakistani economic reform program

The Raisman Program (also known as the Raisman Award) was a series of economic reform programs enacted and established by Pakistan in 1951. Philosophical understanding of the program emerged in 1947 to provide economic distribution of total revenue, at parallel and perpendicular level, in the country. The program was announced by Prime Minister Liaquat Ali Khan in 1947, as part of his new economic policy to curbed the political discrepancies and economic preference. The civil servant, Sir Jeremy Raisman, in Prime Minister Ali Khan's government presented his recommendation in 1947; therefore the program was named after Raisman.

In December 1947, the first award under this program was enacted by Sir Jeremy Raisman after being approved by Prime Minister Liaquat Ali Khan. Under this program, the taxation was federalized with 56% shares of the four provinces and public taxation was transferred to the federal government after the notification of Raisman Program was released on 1 April 1952. Raisman program was later terminated by Prime Minister Liaquat Ali Khan instead renaming as National Finance Commission, also in 1951. Since 1951, the program had enacted only three NFC awards of 1961, 1964 and 1970, which all of these were given in unusual circumstances and remained inconclusive. The first two awards were during the period of promulgating the one unit program.

Since 1951, there were only three of these awards (1961, 1964 and 1970) enacted by the Raisman program. All of these were given in unusual circumstances and their results remained inconclusive. The Raisman program enacted the awards during the promulgation of One Unit Program, and equally distributed with West-Pakistan and East-Pakistan. In 1970, the Raiman program enacted the final third award during the martial law and a year before East Pakistan seceded. Its results too remain inconclusive which became a one reason for this secession was also their resentment on the revenue distributions of the past.

Chronology
Awards listing order (s)	Raisman Award Listing(s)	Presented by	Tests, Results, and Status	Projected Fiscal year
First	Raisman Award, 1951	Liakat Ali Khan	Conclusive	1951–55
Second	NFC Award, 1961	Ayub Khan	Inconclusive	1961–64
Third	NFC Award, 1964	Ayub Khan	Inconclusive	1964–67
Fourth	NFC Award, 1970	Yahya Khan	Inconclusive	Terminated

All information are provided by the press and the Government of Pakistan as public domain

== See also ==
- National Finance Commission Award (NFC Award)
