= Farrukh Saleem =

Pakistani political scientist, economist, financial analyst, journalist

- Citizenship: Pakistan
- Education: New York State University
- Scientific career
- Fields: Political Science
- Workplaces: Center for Research and Security Studies; New York Stock Exchange; National Defence University; Quaid-e-Azam University

Farrukh Saleem (Urdu: فاروخ سليم) is an Islamabad-based Pakistani political scientist, economist, financial analyst, journalist and a television personality.

He has published articles on geopolitics, economic competition and education reforms. He served as the executive director of the Center for Research and Security Studies (CRSS) and as chairman of The Pakistan Footwear Manufacturers Association (PFMA).

== Career ==
Educated in the United States, Dr. Saleem managed equities portfolio invested in the New York Stock Exchange between 1988 until 1994. Upon returning to Pakistan, he began writing English-language analyst articles for The News International. Prior to that, he also contributed in a weekly column for the Dawn newspaper in 1996. His work has covered geopolitical dynamics involving Pakistan, India and Iran. He also authored columnist paper for the Canadian newspaper, the Vancouver Sun. In addition, Saleem has been a guest columnist for the Hong Kong-based Far Eastern Economic Review and the Asia Literary Review. He has served as the CEO of Dominion Stock Funds Limited, a KSE-listed company, and later on as the executive director of the Center for Research and Security Studies (as of December 2011).

== Writings and advocacy ==
=== Threat Matrix and the Afghan war ===
Saleem has provided a critical analyses of Pakistan military's security doctrine.

As President Barack Obama announced the troop evacuation from Afghanistan, Saleem published his article, Threat matrix, which Saleem argues that threat matrix has five major elements: military, nuclear, terrorist, cyber and economic. The first two threats are existential while the last two are non-existential. Saleem further argued that since the country is fighting a "4G War" where the combatants are the state of Pakistan and violent non-state actors (VNSA) from various country, the threats posed by them threaten the "very basis of the state and its physical existence." Existential threats essentially threaten the "unity, demography and integrity" of a nation-state.

In March 2013, Saleem applied his theoretical insights to analyse the "Kayanian Doctrine"— a geopolitical contingency armed program of Pakistan military built on four pillars, comprises:

- American troops would have to withdraw from Afghanistan.
- Reconciliation among Afghan factions is not possible without the ISI.
- The Jalalabad-Torkham-Karachi route remains the most viable for withdrawing American forces.
- India cannot be allowed to encircle Pakistan.

Saleem observes that the doctrine has apparently put India out of the Afghan war equation but in all probability, Pakistan's security challenges are going to become even more challenging when the militants of all sorts and forms could team up in their attempt to subdue Pakistan in which Pakistan military has no contingency plan.

=== Pipedream and Game Theory ===
After the official bilateral signing of IPI Gas pipeline, Saleem remained sceptical towards the building the pipelines. Saleem argued that a "pipedream" is being inaugurated, not a pipeline. In 2009, Saleem published "Game Theory" and provided an explanatory thesis on mathematical "heptagonal game matrix" which, the military, the PPP, the PML-N, US the media and the judiciary as major players in the heptagon matrix.

=== Israel and Jews ===
Saleem has written about the Jewish people, Israel and its geopolitical policies. He advocated for directing a friendly-foreign policy for Israel. His most notable article, "Why are Jews so powerful and Muslims so powerless?", argues that, despite the fact that for every single Jew in the world there are 100 Muslims, Jews are more than a hundred times more powerful than all the Muslims put together. Concluding the article, Saleem pointed out that, the Muslim world is failing to diffuse knowledge.

== Publications ==
- Saleem, Farrukh (2012). A Feasibility Analysis of: Marginal Trading System. Islamabad, Pakistan: Lambert Academic Publishing. p. 80. ISBN 978-3848483952.
