= Center for Research and Security Studies =

Pakistani think tank

- Formation: 2007
- Founder: Imtiaz Gul
- Type: Think tank
- Headquarters: Ali Plaza, F-8 Markaz F 8 Markaz F-8, Islamabad, 44000, Pakistan
- Website: crss.pk

The Center for Research and Security Studies (CRSS) is a Pakistani, Islamabad-based independent non-profit think tank founded by civil society activists to conduct research and advocacy on democratic governance, regional peace and security, human rights, and counter-radicalization. The CRSS specializes in communication to impart information to people in conflict- and disaster-hit areas.

== History ==
CRSS was founded in 2007 by journalist and writer Imtiaz Gul.

== Publications ==
Center for Research and Security Studies (CRSS) is recognized for its publications, including the NAP Tracker and the Annual Security Report. The NAP Tracker audits the Government of Pakistan's counter-terrorism National Action Plan, while the Annual Security Report assesses violence-related casualties nationwide. Committed to enhancing understanding, CRSS produces analyses and policy recommendations, with notable works such as “CPEC: An Explainer” and “A Critical Review of Taliban Rule: August 2021 – December 2023.” For additional insights, the CRSS Blog and the Afghan Studies Center website provide resources for informed discussion on regional issues.
