= Claire Liddell =

Scottish pianist and composer

Elizabeth Claire Liddell (born 24 May 1937) is a Scottish pianist and composer. She was born in Glasgow and studied at the Royal Scottish Academy of Music and Drama in Glasgow and the Royal College of Music in London with William Lloyd Webber.

In The Kinding Fire Liddell sets 12 songs by Robert Burns using the original airs to which he set his verses, with her accompaniments. An LP recording was issued in 1974 with Liddell on piano. She has also written educational music and text books, including The Book of Keyboard Harmony (1979) and So you Want to Play by Ear (1980).

== Works ==
Liddell is known for arrangements of Scottish folk songs and poetry to music. Her selected works include:

- The Kindling Fire, 12 Burns songs (1974)
- Five Orkney Scenes (1975), song cycle, text George Mackay Brown
- Orphead: A Spell for Rain (1978), text George Mackay Brown
- Three Ballads (1989), settings of J.C. Mathieson from French poetry
- Ca' the yowes for soprano and piano
- The Rhythm of Life (1985) song cycle for female voice and piano, text Alice Meynell
- Melody and Country Style for Violin and Piano
- Three Piano Pieces
