= Jeremy Raisman =

British colonial administrator and banker (1892–1978)

Sir Abraham Jeremy Raisman, GCMG, GCIE, KCSI (19 March 1892 – 20 February 1978) was a British administrator in India and banker. He was Finance Member of the Government of India from 1939 to 1945.

== Biography ==
=== Early life and career ===
Raisman was born in Leeds, the third son (and one of 11 surviving children) of a Jewish tailor whose parents had migrated from Lithuania in the 1860s. He was educated at Leeds High School, Leeds University, and Pembroke College, Oxford, where he took a double first in Classical Moderations and Literae humaniores, in addition to the John Locke Scholarship in Moral Philosophy in 1915.

Having been turned down for war service due to his myopia, Raisman instead took the Indian Civil Service examinations, passing out second in his year. In 1916, he was posted to Bihar, then viewed as a backward province, initially as an assistant magistrate and collector, then as under-secretary to the Government of Bihar in the Financial Department from 1920. During his time in Bihar, Raisman improved his Hindi, learned Bhojpuri and Maithili, and studied Sanskrit. He remitted much of his salary to his siblings in England for their education. In 1922, he was transferred to Bombay as assistant collector of customs, and in 1926 he was appointed to the same post in Calcutta. In February 1928, he was appointed commissioner of income tax for Punjab and the North-Western Frontier Province, and again in September 1929. He was also posted to the Central Board of Revenue in August 1929 'on special duty'.

In February 1931, Raisman was appointed a temporary deputy secretary, Government of India, in the Commerce Department, and in May 1931 he became officiating joint secretary to the same. He was confirmed in the post in March 1932. In June 1932, he became an officiating member of the Central Board of Revenue, and was confirmed in the post in January 1935. In June 1936, he was promoted to temporary additional secretary to the Government of India in the Finance Department, and to officiating secretary of the Department in April 1937. In October 1937, he was appointed a director of the Reserve Bank of India.

=== Finance Member of the Government of India ===
In April 1939, Raisman was appointed to the Governor General's Executive Council as Finance Member. As Finance Member, Raisman was responsible for India's war finance, characterized by large deficit spending and increases in government expenditures.

==== Bretton Woods Conference ====
In 1944, Raisman led British India's delegation to the Bretton Woods Conference. His leadership was generally praised, although some Indian delegates felt that the Indian delegation should have been led by an Indian as a matter of principle. Two of the delegates, Sir Shanmukham Chetty and A. D. Shroff, told the Indian media that "the fact that the leader of the Indian delegation at Bretton Woods was not an Indian was embarrassing and humiliating."

Anand Chandavarkar argued that this view was "misplaced nationalist amour propre, for no Indian could have secured a better deal for India at Bretton Woods than Raisman and at no stage were India's interests compromised because of Raisman's British nationality." Archna Negi offers a similar assessment, writing that "[g]iven the background of the manner in which the conference was conducted... it is highly doubtful that in terms of outcomes, the results would have been any different, were the Indian delegation headed by an Indian."

=== Post-Indian career ===
Exhausted by the heavy workload of his office and anxious to pursue a business career in Britain, Raisman had expressed a desire to retire as early as in 1943. However, the British Cabinet turned down a proposal, inspired by Raisman, to appoint an Indian as Finance Member due to a perceived lack of suitable candidates. Raisman was accordingly given an extension in his office until 1945. After presenting his last budget in March 1945, Raisman retired from India.

After returning to England, Raisman was appointed a Public Works Loan Commissioner in 1947 and was Chairman of the Public Works Loans Board from 1948 to 1970. He was vice-chairman of Lloyds Bank from 1947 to 1953 and deputy chairman from 1953 to 1963. He was also deputy chairman of Glaxo and a director of Sun Alliance.

In addition to his public and business careers, after his retirement Raisman became sought after as an international fiscal advisor.

Pakistan's Raisman Program is named after Raisman.

=== Honours ===
Raisman was appointed CIE in 1934, CSI in 1938, knighted in 1939, KCSI in 1941, GCIE in 1945, and GCMG in 1959. He received an honorary LLD from the University of Leeds in 1961 and was an honorary fellow of Pembroke College, Oxford.

== Family ==
Raisman married Renée Mary Kelly in 1925. They had two sons: John Michael Raisman, CBE (born 1929), chairman of Shell UK from 1979 to 1985, and Jeremy Philip Raisman (1935–2016), a solicitor who was senior partner of Eversheds from 1993 to 1999.
