= Groisman =

Groisman, Groysman are the Yiddish-language variants of the surname Grossman, variant transliterations of the Cyrillic spelling Гро́йсман, which comes from the pale of settlement in the region of Bessarabia of the Russian Empire. Notable people with the surname include:

- Volodymyr Groysman (born 1978), Ukrainian politician, Prime Minister of Ukraine
- Serginho Groisman, Brazilian television presenter and journalist
- Yvonne Jospa, née Have Groisman (1910-2000), cofounder and leading organizer of the Comité de Défense des Juifs
- L. Rafael Reif Groisman (born 1950), Venezuelan-American electrical engineer, writer and academic administrator

== See also ==
- Groys
