= Statistics Division (Pakistan) =

Defunct Ministry of the Government of Pakistan

Agency overview
- Superseding agency: Pakistan Bureau of Statistics
- Headquarters: Islamabad, Islamabad Capital Territory
- Minister responsible: Finance Minister of Pakistan
- Agency executive: Asif Bajwa, Secretary

The Statistics Division of the Government of Pakistan, also known as Statistics Division, was a department of the federal government of Pakistan, which was mandated to frame policies for the development of statistical services in the country. The Department provided a solid statistical base to national and international planners, policymakers, researchers, and other data users in various socio-economic sectors. The Division was established on May 20, 2003, with the advice of noted statisticians and mathematicians to the Government of Pakistan. Initially, the Statistics Division was established under the technical directions of Scientist Emeritus of PAEC, Dr. Asghar Qadir. In 2019, it was abolished.

The Statistics Division was part of the Ministry of Finance of the Government of Pakistan which also contained the Federal Bureau of Statistics, a major source of data about Pakistan, its demographics, and its economy. It has been superseded by Pakistan Bureau of Statistics.
