= Pensions in Pakistan =

Pensions in Pakistan are retirement benefits and social security payments for eligible workers and civil servants in Pakistan. The country's pension landscape includes statutory contributory schemes for formal employees, voluntary private pension products, civil-service pension reforms and social transfers that affect older people. Coverage is low outside the formal sector and recent years have seen policy changes to expand and reshape provision.

== Overview ==
Pension arrangements are a mix of statutory, employer-based and voluntary schemes. The Employees Old-Age Benefits Institution (EOBI) provides a basic contributory pension for many private-sector workers in covered establishments. Civil servants historically received defined-benefit pensions but in 2025 the federal government moved to a contributory model for new entrants and provential governments have issued rules for defined-contribution pension schemes.

== Coverage ==
Most pension coverage in Pakistan is limited to formal sector workers who are covered either by employer schemes or by EOBI. The informal sector, which accounts for the majority of employment in Pakistan, remains largely outside formal pension coverage, leaving many older people without contributory retirement income.

Normal pension age under earnings-related private sector arrangements is generally 60 for men and 55 for women with a minimum period of contributions (typically 15 years), according to the OECD overview for the Asia/Pacific region.

== Pension Funds and Schemes ==
=== Employees Old-Age Benefits Institution (EOBI) ===
The Employees Old-Age Benefits Institution (EOBI) was established under the EOB Act 1976 and is Pakistan's main statutory pension scheme for workers in registered establishments. Contributions are paid by employers and workers, the law sets contribution rates and the benefit formula. EOBI pays old-age pensions, survivors pensions and disability benefits to eligible claimants.

EOBI has been the subject of policy debate on adequacy and sustainability. Coverage is concentrated among registered employers, many private-sector and informal workers remain outside the scheme. In recent years EOBI reported growth in revenues and the government authorised periodic increases in minimum pension levels, while trade unions have called for further reforms to expand coverage and improve pension adequacy.

Contribution arrangements were amended in line with minimum wage changes and other statutory adjustments effective from July 2024, employers typically contribute a percentage of wages and the worker contributes a smaller share, as set out in EOBI regulations.

=== Civil service pensions and contributory reform ===
Historically, federal civil servants received defined-benefit pensions. In 2024 the federal government announced the introduction of a contributory pension fund scheme for new entrants to the federal civil service. The Ministry of Finance circular (3 September 2024) explained that the Contributory Pension Fund Scheme will apply to new hires and set out contribution arrangements and governance measures.

Provinces have followed with their own defined-contribution frameworks. Government of Puniab issued the Punjab Defined Contribution Pension Scheme Rules (2025) setting out account types, default fund allocations and employer-employee contribution mechanics for provincial employees. The Khyber Pakhtunkhwa government followed with their rules setting out the rates for contributions among employee and employer.

=== Voluntary Pension Scheme ===
The Voluntary Pension System (VPS) allows individuals to join privately managed pension funds administered by asset managers licensed in Pakistan. The Mutual Funds Association of Pakistan (MUFAP) provides guidance and performance data for VPS products. VPS funds can be conventional or Shariah-compliant and attract tax incentives within statutory limits.
