= List of tariffs in Pakistan =

This is a descriptive list of the various trade tariffs and customs duties which apply in Pakistan.

== Import duty ==
Custom duties are levied according to the rates given in the First Schedule, which includes:

- Goods imported to Pakistan
- Goods purchased in bond from one custom station to another
- Goods brought from a foreign country to any customs station that are trans-shipped or transported without the payment of duty to another customs station.

== Export duty ==
Pakistan does not levy an export duty.

== Regulatory duty ==
The Federal Government can impose limitations or restrictions on regulatory duty on all or any of the imported or exported goods through a notification in the official Gazette. Such limitations or restrictions, according to the First Schedule, should not exceed 100% of the goods value, as specified under Section 25-1B or Section 25-A. Such regulations are applicable from the day they are specified in the Gazette notification.

== Additional customs duty ==
The Federal Government can impose additional customs duty on imported goods specified in the First Schedule through a notification in the official Gazette. The additional customs duty should not exceed 35% of the goods value, as specified under Section 25-2A or Section 25A-2b.
