= Taxation in Pakistan =

Taxation in Pakistan is a cornerstone of the country’s economic framework, managed by the Federal Board of Revenue (FBR). The FBR operates under the Ministry of Finance and is tasked with formulating tax policies, collecting federal taxes, and ensuring compliance with tax laws. It oversees various tax departments, including those dealing with customs, income tax, and sales tax. The FBR also plays a crucial role in drafting tax-related legislation and implementing measures to combat tax evasion. The taxation system in Pakistan encompasses both direct and indirect taxes, which contribute significantly to the nation’s revenue.

Taxation in Pakistan is a complex system of more than 70 unique taxes administered by at least 37 agencies of the Government of Pakistan.

== History ==
Taxation in Pakistan has evolved since the country’s independence in 1947, largely based on the British colonial tax system. Initially, Pakistan inherited the tax structures and administrative mechanisms of British rule, which included a comprehensive framework for indirect taxation. Over the years, however, Pakistan has modified and adapted these systems to better suit its unique economic and social landscape. Key reforms have included the introduction of progressive income taxation and tax incentives to support industrial growth. Despite efforts to modernize, remnants of the colonial tax system, such as the heavy reliance on indirect taxes, continue to influence the current structure. Taxation reforms over time have included digitalization, such as the introduction of computerized systems and electronic filing methods, aimed at improving tax compliance and streamlining processes.

== Taxation policy ==
Pakistan’s core tax policy is based on the principle of ability to pay, which means those who earn more should contribute more. This principle is universally accepted, and income is considered a reasonable — though not perfect — measure of this ability.

== Tax Laws ==
=== The Income Tax Act of 1922 ===
The Income Tax Act of 1922 was prevalent during the British Raj and was inherited by both the governments of India and Pakistan upon independence and partition in 1947. This act initially formed the basis of both countries' income tax codes.

=== The Income Tax Ordinance, 1979 ===
The Income Tax Ordinance was the first law on income tax which was promulgated in Pakistan from 28 June 1979 by the Government of Pakistan.

=== The Income Tax Ordinance, 2001 ===
To update the tax laws and bring the country's tax laws into line with international standards, the Income Tax Ordinance 2001 was promulgated on 13 September 2001. It became effective from 1 July 2002. Following the recent budget, the Income Tax Ordinance as amended up to 30 June 2024, and the updated Finance Act 2024 are now available.

=== IT rules 2002 ===
IT (Income Tax) rules 2002 were promulgated by the Federal Board of Revenue (FBR) on 1 July 2002 in exercise of its powers granted under section 237 of the ordinance.

=== Statutory Regulatory Orders (SROs) ===
Statutory Regulatory Orders (SROs) are government regulations issued by the Federal Board of Revenue (FBR) or other provincial or local tax authorities in Pakistan. SROs can apply to a variety of areas, including taxes, commerce, energy, and the auto sector. Basics Types of SROs are;

- Procedural SROs: Create rules and procedures to implement laws and amendments to existing SROs
- Concessionary SROs: Grant tax exemptions or concessions, or impose additional taxes.

== Tax administration ==
The Federal Board of Revenue (FBR) is the principal tax administration body in Pakistan. It is responsible for formulating, implementing, and enforcing tax laws. The FBR has faced criticism for its inefficiency and corruption, which has hindered tax collection efforts. The FBR operates under the Ministry of Finance and is tasked with:

- Implementing tax laws
- Collecting tax revenues
- Preventing tax evasion and fraud
- Facilitating taxpayer services

The FBR is responsible for administering federal taxes, while provincial revenue authorities handle taxes within their respective jurisdictions. Notable provincial authorities include:

- Punjab Revenue Authority (PRA)
- Sindh Revenue Board (SRB)
- Khyber Pakhtunkhwa Revenue Authority (KPRA)
- Baluchistan Revenue Authority (BRA)

These bodies are tasked with collecting provincial taxes, such as sales tax on services, and implementing regional tax policies. The FBR has taken various steps to improve tax compliance, including the implementation of e-filing systems, offering tax amnesty schemes, and running public awareness campaigns.

== Direct taxes / income taxes ==
Federal income taxes are administered by the Federal Board of Revenue. The period from 1 July to 30 June is considered as a normal tax year for Pakistan tax law purposes.

- Income tax: This tax is levied on the income of individuals, associations of persons (AOPs), and corporations. For instance, individuals earning less than PKR 600,000 annually are exempt from income tax, while those with annual earnings exceeding PKR 5.6 million are taxed at the highest rate of 45%.
- Corporate tax: Corporate tax is imposed on the profits of corporations at a standard rate of 29%. The tax structure is progressive, aiming to fairly distribute the tax burden across different income groups. The corporate income tax rate was 29% for tax year 2019 and onwards, whereas the corporate tax rate is 35% for the banking industry for TY 2019. Alternative Corporate Tax (ACT) in Pakistan applies to all corporate entities and is the higher of 17% of accounting income or the corporate tax liability under the Income Tax Ordinance 2001, including the minimum tax on turnover.
- Service Tax: Service tax is applied on services, including transportation, logistics, technology, and professional services. Rates of service tax varies depends on status of the tax payers and type of services. Generally its 4% for active taxpayers and 8% for inactive taxpayers or late filers. Some of the services are taxed at reduced rates although.

Income tax on export of services in Pakistan is 1%. However, the export of IT services is taxed at a reduced rate of 0.25% if registered with PSEB, Pakistan Software Export Board. In addition to corporate tax, there are other applicable income taxes including super tax, minimum tax, and tax on undistributed reserves.

Generally, manufacturing business is taxable at the corporate tax rate whereas trading business and commercial imports business is taxable as "minimum tax". For example, 5.5% withholding income tax is applicable on commercial imports and is payable at the import stage. This 5.5% withholding tax will be considered as minimum tax and Corporate Tax is also applicable, whichever is higher will be the tax liability, on this business.

=== Withholding taxes (WHT) in Pakistan ===
Withholding tax is a mechanism through which the FBR collects tax from individuals and businesses on certain sources of income or expenditure. Withholding tax is deducted from various sources of one's income or expenditure, such as salary, dividends, interest, vehicle registration, transfer of ownership, property transactions, prepaid/postpaid/landline phone bills, and others. Every person and business along with corporate sectors are required to deduct withholding taxes while paying for goods (PKR. 75,000/yr) and services (PKR 30,000/yr).

Withholding tax (WHT) rates rates applicable in Pakistan for 2024-25
| Payment Types | Type | Entity | Slabs (PKR) | | Taxpayer Status | | | Explanation (if needed) |
| Payment Types | Type | Entity | From | Till | Active | Late Filer | Inactive | Explanation (if needed) |
|---|---|---|---|---|---|---|---|---|
| Goods | Others | Company | Fixed | | 5% | | 10% | |
| Goods | Others | Individual and AOP | Fixed | | 5.5% | | 11% | |
| Goods | Toll Manufacturing | Company | Fixed | | 18% | | 9% | |
| Goods | Toll Manufacturing | Individual and AOP | Fixed | | 11% | | 22% | |
| Goods | Sale of Rice, cotton seed, edible oils | | Fixed | | 1.5% | | 3% | |
| Services | Others | Company | Fixed | | 9% | | 18% | |
| Services | Others | Individual and AOP | Fixed | | 11% | | 22% | |
| Services | Advertisement (Electronic/print media) | | Fixed | | 1.5% | | 3% | |
| Services | Advertisement other than Electronic/print media | | Fixed | | 4% | | 8% | |

== Indirect taxes ==
Indirect tax, more commonly knows as sales tax, is also applicable on supply of goods and provision of services.

Sales tax is a value-added tax imposed on the sale of goods and services. It is a significant source of revenue for the federal and provincial governments. Under the 18th Amendment to the Constitution of Pakistan, the right to charge sales tax on services has been given to the provincial governments where as the right to charge sales tax on goods has been given to the federal government. Consequently, provincial revenue authorities were created to manage and collect provincial sales tax in their respective provinces.

Below is a summary of the applicable sales tax rates in Pakistan:

- Sales tax on goods: 18%
- Sindh sales tax on services: 15%
- Punjab sales tax on services: 16%
- Balochistan sales tax on services: 15%
- Khyber Pakhtunkhwa (KPK) sales tax on services: 15%
- Islamabad Capital Territory (tax on services): 15%

== Provincial taxes ==
Provinces have the authority to administer and collect certain taxes, including:

- Property tax: Tax levied on the ownership of real estate
- Agriculture income tax: Tax on income derived from agricultural activities
- Professional tax: Imposed on individuals engaged in specific professions or occupations

== Other Taxes in Pakistan ==
Pakistan's tax system encompasses a variety of levies beyond income tax. Taxation in Pakistan is no doubt one of the complicated tax system in the world. Here is the list of other applicable taxes in Pakistan.

=== Capital value tax ===
The capital value tax (CVT) is a significant tool used by the Pakistani government to generate revenue. The CVT is applied to specific asset categories, including motor vehicles, certain foreign assets, and designated immovable properties. This tax plays a role in the government's efforts to diversify its revenue sources and modernize its tax administration.

=== Capital gains tax ===
Capital gains tax in Pakistan is levied on profits from the sale of capital assets, which include property, jewelry, artwork, and collectibles, excluding stock-in-trade, depreciable assets, and personal-use items, as defined by the Income Tax Ordinance 2001. The Federal Board of Revenue Helpline has been although reportedly providing incorrect information to taxpayers regarding the capital gains tax on gold, despite clear provisions in the Income Tax Ordinance. Gold is categorized as a taxable asset in Pakistan, subject to capital gains tax under Sections 37(5)(d) and 38(5) of the Income Tax Ordinance, unlike immovable assets held for personal use, which are exempt.

=== Token tax ===
In Pakistan, annual token tax for private vehicles varies significantly based on engine capacity and tax filing status. Filers, those who regularly submit tax returns to the FBR, enjoy considerably lower rates compared to non-filers. For instance, vehicles up to 1000cc incur Rs. 800 for filers and Rs. 1600 for non-filers, with rates progressively increasing for larger engine sizes, reaching Rs. 10,000 and Rs. 20,000 for vehicles 2000cc and above, respectively. Similarly, passenger transport vehicle taxes are determined by seating capacity and air-conditioning, with filers consistently paying less. This system incentivizes tax compliance, highlighting the financial benefits of filing tax returns in Pakistan.

=== Customs duty ===
Imposed on the import and export of goods. This tax is intended to regulate trade and generate revenue from international transactions.

=== Excise duty ===
Levied on the production of specific goods such as alcohol, tobacco, and petroleum products.

=== Supreme Court Rebuke on Coercive Tax Practices ===
In 2025, the Supreme Court of Pakistan delivered a critical judgment highlighting the coercive and arbitrary nature of tax recovery practices by the Federal Board of Revenue (FBR). The Court ruled that issuing same-day recovery notices violates taxpayers’ constitutional rights, including due process (Article 10A) and dignity (Article 14).

The judgment, authored by Justice Ayesha Malik, stated that recovery must follow legal safeguards and cannot ignore the need for fair notice. It marked a rare institutional stand for taxpayer rights in a system where ordinary Pakistanis often face harassment, intimidation, and procedural abuse in the name of revenue collection.

== Active Taxpayer List ==
Active Taxpayers List is a database which is maintained by the Federal Board of Revenue on their website. Taxpayers in Pakistan are categorized into three categories.

- In-Active: Those who are not registered with FBR or not filing their tax returns.
- Active: Those who file their tax returns on time. Usually before 30 September.

According to the Federal Board of Revenue (FBR), the number of registered tax filers in 2021 was 7.1 million, with 2.5 million classified as active tax filers. The 2023 Active Taxpayers List recorded 3.35 million taxpayers (who filed returns or settled fees by 29 February 2024), representing a decline from 5.73 million in 2022 amid ongoing tax compliance reforms.

By 17 March 2025, the number of active taxpayers in Pakistan rose to 6,534,053, reflecting a year-over-year increase of approximately 700,000. This figure further expanded to 7,335,119 by 15 July 2025. The active taxpayer base continued to grow rapidly, reaching 8,300,235 in July 2026 and hitting a record 9,032,971 by September 2026.

== Year-wise tax collection in Pakistan ==
The FBR surpassed its collection target by RS 247 billion from July to March of fiscal year 21-22, which represents an increase by 29.1% over the collection of 3,394 billion rupees during the same period last year. On the other hand, gross collections also increased by 28.9%. The FBR fell short of its revenue target for the first two months of the fiscal year 2024 but still surpassed its annual collection target for FY23, reaching Rs. 9.285 trillion. The government aims to raise Rs12.97 trillion in FY25, a 40% jump from the previous year. However from July 2024 till February 2025 Federal Board of Revenue is facing a short-fall of PKR 601 billion in their target for same period.

Tax Collections by in FBR from 2003–24
| Fiscal year | Tax collected PKR (in billion) | Fiscal year | Tax collected PKR (in billion) | Fiscal year | Tax collected PKR (in billion) |
|---|---|---|---|---|---|
| 2003-04 | 5000.8 | 2004-05 | 590.4 | 2005-06 | 713.5 |
| 2006-07 | 847.2 | 2007-08 | 1008.1 | 2008-09 | 1161.2 |
| 2009-10 | 1327.4 | 2010-11 | 1558 | 2011-12 | 1882.7 |
| 2012-13 | 1946.4 | 2013-14 | 2254.5 | 2014-15 | 2590 |
| 2015-16 | 3112.5 | 2016-17 | 3367.9 | 2017-18 | 3843.8 |
| 2018-19 | 328.5 | 2019-20 | 3996.7 | 2020-21 | 4734 |
| 2021-22 | 612.1 | 2022-23 | 7163.8 | 2023-24 | 9285 |

Explanation: This is the revenue collection by Federal Board of Revenue only. Other tax collecting authorities figures are not included.

- Sindh Revenue Board collection was PKR 21.30 billion in December 2023, which increased by 27% in December 2024 reaching PKR 27.03 billion. For the first half of FY 2025, SRB collected PKR 133.14 billion, which was PKR 108.59 billion in the first half of FY 2024.
- Khyber Pukhtoonkhwa Revenue Authority on the other hand collected PKR 24.2 billion in the first half of FY 2025, with an increase of about 45% for same period in FY 2024. From July to December in 2024 KPRA collection was PKR 16.7 billion.

== International cooperation ==
Pakistan has collaborated with international organizations such as the International Monetary Fund (IMF) and the World Bank to reform its taxation system and improve fiscal policies. The IMF has supported Pakistan through programs like the Extended Fund Facility (EFF), which focuses on structural reforms aimed at enhancing revenue mobilization. The World Bank has also provided technical assistance, particularly through the Tax Reform Support Program, which aims to modernize the tax system by promoting digital solutions and building the capacity of tax authorities. Additionally, Pakistan has signed Double Taxation Agreements (DTAs) with various countries to facilitate international trade and investment and prevent the issue of double taxation for cross-border transactions.

== Impact on the economy ==
Taxation is essential for financing public goods and services, infrastructure projects, and social programs in Pakistan. Revenue generated through taxes supports large-scale national initiatives such as:

- China-Pakistan Economic Corridor (CPEC): A major infrastructure and development project aimed at boosting economic growth
- Benazir Income Support Program (BISP): A social safety net providing financial assistance to low-income families
- Sehat Sahulat Program: A health insurance scheme for underprivileged populations

These initiatives highlight the central role of taxation in sustaining economic development and improving social welfare. However, inefficiencies within the system have hindered the full realization of tax revenue potential, necessitating ongoing reforms to enhance efficiency and equity.

== Problems ==
The FBR has tried to increase the advance tax rates for non-filers to enforce the filing of returns. but this step could not show any extra-ordinary success.

However, with the incorporation of Section 114B in the Income Tax Ordinance, 2001, vide Finance Act 2022, FBR can now enforce the filing of income tax returns by disabling mobile phones, sims, electricity connections, gas connections and restricting foreign travel of non-filers.

== Challenges in taxation ==
Despite its potential, Pakistan's taxation system faces several significant challenges:

- Low tax-to-GDP ratio: Pakistan’s tax-to-GDP ratio remains lower than the global average. In recent years, the ratio has been approximately 9.5%, far below that of neighboring countries like India (16%) and Bangladesh (12%). This indicates inefficiencies in tax collection and necessitates systemic reforms.
- Tax evasion: A substantial portion of the economy operates in the informal sector, leading to widespread tax evasion. This undermines revenue generation and hampers the effectiveness of tax policies.
- Overburden on salaried class: Pakistan's salaried class pays more than its potential while the retail sector have options to avoid it. During the tax year 2025 the salaried class paid Rs. 545 Billion while the retailers paid only Rs. 62 Billion. The number of potential taxpayers from the both sectors are nearly equal, i.e. 2 to 2.5 million in each sector.
- Over-reliance on indirect taxes: Pakistan's tax system is heavily dependent on indirect taxes, such as sales tax, which are regressive and disproportionately affect low-income individuals.
- Corruption: According to a 2002 study, 99% of 256 respondents reported facing corruption with regard to taxation. 32% of respondents reported paying bribes to have their tax assessment lowered, and nearly 14% reported receiving fictitious tax assessments until a bribe was paid.

== Reforms and initiatives ==
The government has introduced various reforms and initiatives to address these challenges and improve the tax system:

- Broadening the tax base: Efforts have been made to expand the number of taxpayers and increase revenue collection from previously untapped sources.
- Automation: The introduction of automated tax systems, such as the Iris system, has helped streamline tax administration, reduce corruption, and improve transparency.
- Tax incentives: The government has introduced various tax incentives to encourage voluntary compliance, such as exemptions for certain industries (Cottage and small scale industries in Pakistan) and tax breaks for foreign investors.

=== POS integration ===
According to new tax laws (SRO-1006), all tier-1 retailers are required to integrate their POSs with FBR’s real time invoicing system in Pakistan. It is also mandatory for all restaurants to integrate their POSs. These FBR Invoicing system and FBR Integrated POS systems should be able to handle sales, returns and exchanges. Around 11,744 POS terminals have been integrated with the real-time reporting system by 31 July 2021.

For speeding up the process, the FBR on 9 August 2021 through SRO 1005 (I)/2021 announced a prize scheme to encourage tier-1 retailers to get themselves integrated with the real-time sales reporting system. However, SRO 1005 (I)/2021 was later on suspended till 31 January 2023 via S.R.O. No. 2042(1). Many medium- and small-sized tier-1 retailers of various types have yet to integrate their point-of-sale (POS) with the Federal Board of Revenue (FBR) for real-time reporting of sales. To facilitate these Tier 1 retailers in Pakistan with integration and installation of such POS systems Tier3 has launched FBR POS Integration Software – FBR POS. A specialised advance Inventory management and POS system is specially developed for retailers in Pakistan keeping in focus the info security and integrity of data and processes involved.

== Digital Invoicing ==
The Digital Invoicing System is a pivotal step towards modernizing the taxation process by streamlining invoice management and fostering compliance. It provides an integrated platform for taxpayers, license integrators, and tax officers to collaborate effectively in managing and validating digital invoices in accordance with FBR regulations. On 22 April 2025, the Pakistan Federal Board of Revenue (FBR) expanded electronic invoicing requirements to include both corporate and noncorporate registered persons.

The Pakistan Federal Board of Revenue (FBR), through notification SRO No. 709(I)/2005 on 22 April 2025, outlined new electronic invoicing requirements for both corporate and noncorporate registered persons. Previously, electronic invoicing was required only for the fast-moving consumer goods (FMCG) sector.

While the government has approved four licensed integrators for this purpose, there is an affordable alternative for taxpayers already using ERP/accounting systems or seeking lower-cost options outside of high-priced licensed ERP solutions. A smart web-based FBR Digital e-Invoicing Software is a Pakistan-based AI-powered tax compliance platform that automates invoice data extraction and mapping using a proprietary large language model trained on over 3,000 invoice formats, enabling accurate integration with the Federal Board of Revenue (FBR) Digital Invoicing API.

Corporate and noncorporate entities were required to integrate their hardware and software with the FBR's computerized system by 1 May 2025 and 1 June 2025, however an extension to this dead line was granted extending it for 1 month in April 2025.

== Future outlook ==
Pakistan aims to further digitize its taxation system to increase transparency, reduce bureaucracy, and foster a culture of tax compliance. Recent initiatives such as the Tax Asaan mobile application, which allows taxpayers to file returns electronically, and the expansion of the Iris e-filing system, are part of efforts to simplify tax administration. Structural reforms are expected to enhance revenue collection, reduce dependency on external borrowing, and move the country toward a more equitable and efficient tax system.

== See also ==
- Federal Board of Revenue
- Economy of Pakistan
