= Gilani government =

Government of Pakistan (2008–2012)

Gilani Government
- 42nd Cabinet of Pakistan
- 2008–2012
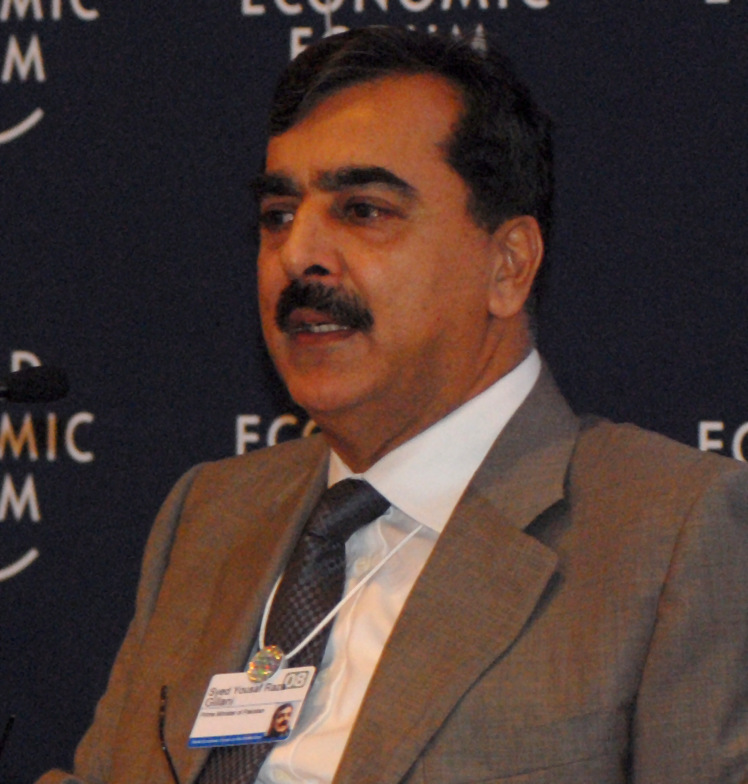
- Date formed: 31 March 2008
- Date dissolved: 19 June 2012

People and organisations
- Head of state: Pervez Musharraf (until August 2008); Asif Ali Zardari (from August 2008)
- Head of government: Yusuf Raza Gillani
- Member party: PPP; ANP; MQM-L; JUI(F)
- Status in legislature: Coalition government
- Opposition party: PML-N

History
- Election: 2008 general election
- Legislature term: 5 years
- Predecessor: Aziz government
- Successor: Ashraf government

The Gilani government began its operation into office on 31 March 2008 after Yusuf Raza Gilani was elected as Prime minister of Pakistan by the National Assembly on 25 March 2008. The swearing-in of the government’s cabinet was delayed for a few days until March 31 because of differences arising amongst the coalition partners.

The leftist PPP gained substantial seats in the Parliament in the general elections held in 2008 but lacked enough seats to form a government with a simple majority. Initially with the coalition government, the conservative PML-N quickly departed when its leader, Nawaz Sharif (former Prime Minister), decided to lead the efforts on impeaching the former President Pervez Musharraf as well as restoring the judiciary, of which, the PML(N) played a centralized role.

Prime Minister Gillani decided to centralize the power by forming a more dense left-wing alliance that consisted of minor left parties: the ANP, MQM, JUI(F). As Prime Minister, Gillani escalated the military operations to keep pressure on Taliban and as well on the Baloch separatists. Gillani greatly relaxed the taxation that effected the annual GDP growth and initiated the welfare programme. Responding to global recession, Gillani implemented the nationalization of conglomerates and tightly controlled the means of production of the industries. Relations with Bangladesh, Afghanistan, and India worsen in 2008–12 as well criticism from the United States widened. In 2011, the U.S. initiated a secret operation to hunt down the Osama bin Laden without the knowledge of Prime Minister Gilani.

Prime Minister Gilani's government witnessed the sharp rise in nationwide violence, increased corruption in nationalized industries, social tension, political scandals and assassinations. After months of delaying the Supreme Court's recommendations to investigate the corruption cases against Benazir Bhutto, Gilani was ousted from the office; nonetheless, his ministry continued to be in effect by his successor. Overall ratings remains negative on Gilani as his tenure has been described as a "clash of state institutions, involving the executive, the armed forces and the judiciary." Under his government, Gilani was held responsible for the prolonged "Era of Stagflation", in which fundamental economic problems were ignored. In 2013, there was an increase in criticism of the Gilanian years, even after the NRO squabble was eventually resolved by his successor.

== Gilani cabinet ==
=== Cabinet ===
At swearing-in ceremony, the PML(N) members declined to take oath under President General Pervez Musharraf, who they considered an illegitimate head of state. The first cabinet was short-lived lasting only 2 weeks; the list of federal ministers short-listed for the cabinet included two women members of the lower house and three members of the senate.

Gilani Cabinets (2008–12)	Figure	Collective alliance	Notes on Tenure
Prime Minister	Yousaf Raza Gilani	PPP	2008–12
President	Asif Zardari; Muhammad Soomro (Acting); Pervez Musharraf	PPP; Independent; PML(Q)	2008–12; 18 August–9 September 2008; 2007–2008
Cabinet Ministries	Cabinet Ministers	Collective alliance	Tenure
Foreign Affairs	Mehmood Qureshi; Hina Rabbani Khar	PPP	2008–11; 2011–12
Finance	Abdul Hafeez Shaikh; Shaukat Tarin; Naveed Qamar (Ishaq Dar)	PPP; Independent; PPP (PML(N))	2010–12; 2008–2010; May 12 – October 8, 2008 (31 March–13 May 2008)
Interior	Rehman Malik	PPP	2008–2012
States and Frontiers	Najmuddin Khan	PPP	2008–12
Petroleum and Natural Resources	Asim Hussain ((Muhammad Asif)) Mrs Iffat Mahfooz	PPP (PML(N))	2008–12 (31 March–13 May 2008)
Defence	Naveed Qamar; Ahmad Mukhtar	PPP; PPP	2012; 2008–12
Defence Production	(Senior Minister Chaudhry Pervaiz Elahi); Manzoor Wattoo; Shahabuddin (Tanveer Hussain)	PML(Q); PPP; PPP (PML(N))	2011–12; 16 March–5 May 2011; 2010–11; 2008–10; 31 March–13 May 2008
Water and Power	Ahmad Mukhtar; Pervez Ashraf	PPP; PPP	2011–12; 2008–11
Railways	Ahmad Bilour (Mehtab Ahmed Khan)	ANP (PML(N))	2008–12; 31 March–13 May 2008
Law, Justice, Human Rights	Farooq Naik; Babar Avan	PPP; PPP	2011–12; 2008–11
Information, Broadcasting, National Heritage	Firdous Ashiq Avan; Qamar Zaman Kaira; Sherry Rehman	PPP; PPP; PPP	2011–12; 2009–11; 2008–09
Communications, Food Security	Mrs Iffat Mahfooz	PPP (PML(N))	2008–12; 31 March–13 May 2008
Ports and Shipping	Babar Ghuari; Naveed Qamar	MQM-L; PPP	2010–12; 2008–10
Education Research	Mir Hazar Bijrani (Ahsan Iqbal)	PPP (PML(N))	2008–12; 31 March–13 May 2008
Overseas Pakistanis	Farooq Sattar; Khurshid Shah	MQM-L; PPP	2010–12; 2008–10
Health and Welfare	Riaz Pirzada; Humayun Aziz Kurd	PML(Q); PPP	2010–12; 2008–10
Northern Areas	Qamar Zaman Kaira; Manzoor Wattoo	PPP; PPP	2011–12; 2008–11
Commerce	Amin Fahim (Shahid Abbasi)	PPP (PML(N))	2008–12; 31 March–13 May 2008
Housings and Works	Rehmatullah Kakar	PPP	2008–12
Science and Technology	Mir Chengiz Khan; Azam Swati (Sa'ad Rafiq)	PPP; JUI(F) (PML(N))	2011–12; 2010–11; 31 March–13 May 2008
Women Development, Culture	Ghazala Gola (Tehmina Daultana)	PPP (PML(N))	2008–12; 31 March–13 May 2008
Environment	Hameedullah Jan Afridi	ANP	2008–12
Rural Developments	Ghulam Ahmad Bilour	ANP	2008–12
Social Affairs	Muhammad Hoti	ANP	2008–12

Cabinet composition of Gilani ministry
Party	Number
PPP	23
MQM-L	2
ANP	4
PML(Q)	1
JUI(F)	1
