= Raja Pervez Ashraf government =

Cabinet of Pakistan (2012–2013)

Raja Pervez Ashraf Government
- 43rd Cabinet of Pakistan
- 2012–2013
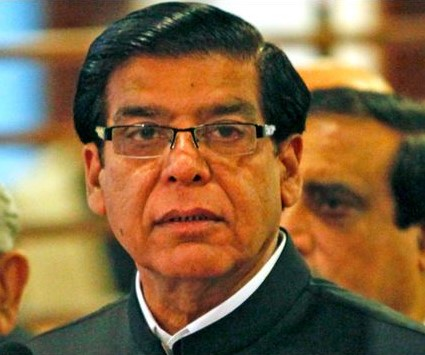
- Date formed: 22 June 2012
- Date dissolved: 24 March 2013

People and organisations
- Head of state: Asif Ali Zardari
- Head of government: Raja Pervez Ashraf
- Deputy head of government: Pervaiz Elahi
- Member party: PPP, PML (Q), ANP, MQM-L, JUI (F)
- Status in legislature: Coalition government
- Opposition party: PMLN

History
- Election: 2008 general election (election of ministers)
- Legislature term: 5 years
- Predecessor: Gillani government
- Successor: Khoso caretaker ministry

On 22 June 2012, the Ashraf government was sworn in as the official government and cabinet of Pakistan from 2012 to 2013 after, On 26 April 2012, The previous Gillani government head, Prime Minister Yousaf Raza Gillani was convicted of being in contempt of court for refusing to bring charges against President Asif Ali Zardari. On 19 June 2012, Gillani was retroactively ruled ineligible to hold the office by the Supreme Court. Raja Pervez Ashraf was then selected as the ruling Pakistan People’s Party government’s next option. Ashraf’s selection as Prime Minister restored the country's government after several days of turmoil where officially the country was without a government.

Despite the change in the office of the Prime Minister, the cabinet relatively remained the same from Gillani’s government, including the same ruling party, the Pakistan People’s Party, as well as the same ruling 13th National assembly. Although there were minor adjustments, such as the addition of the PML(Q) to the ruling coalition, which involved including Pervaiz Elahi into the government as a high-level position holder.

The Associated Press said that the Ashraf government’s election was "unlikely to calm the tensions roiling the country" and noted that many observers expected him to eventually be ousted like his predecessor. Political analyst Raza Rumi said Ashraf was likely chosen by the PPP because they knew he would not last long. On 24 July 2012, the government informed the Supreme Court, one day before expiry of the court's deadline, that it had not taken a decision on reopening of the graft cases against President Zardari.

== Cabinet members ==
The following are the members of the Cabinet of Pakistan under Raja Pervez Ashraf’s administration from 2012-2013.

Incumbent	Party	Office
Federal Ministers
Raja Pervez Ashraf	PPP	Prime Minister
Chaudhry Pervaiz Elahi	PML(Q)	Deputy Prime Minister Industry Minister of Pakistan
Hina Rabbani Khar	PPP	Foreign Affairs
Mir Hazar Khan Bijarani	PPP	Minister for Inter-Provincial Coordination
Farooque Hamid Naik	PPP	Law, Justice and Parliamentary Affairs
Syed Naveed Qamar	PPP	Defence
Qamar Zaman Kaira	PPP	Media Information and Mass Broadcasting
Arbab Alamgir Khan	PPP	Communications
Mumtaz Kahloon	PPP	National Vocational and Technical Training Commission, Navtec
Abdul Hafeez Shaikh	PPP	Finance, Revenue, Planning and Development, Economic Affairs and Statistics.
Ahmad Mukhtar	PPP	Water and Power
Ghulam Ahmad Bilour	ANP	Railways
Syed Khurshid Ahmed Shah	PPP	Religious Affairs
Ameen Faheem	PPP	Commerce and Agriculture
Makhdoom Shahabuddin	PPP	Industry, Manpower
Manzoor Wattoo	PPP	States, Frontiers, and Kashmir Affairs
Mir Changez Jamali	ANP	Science and Technology
Alhaj Omar Goreij	PPP	Telecommunications
Samina Khalid Ghurki	PPP	Environment, Minorities, and Human Rights
Rehman Malik	PPP	Ministry of Interior
Ministers of State
Dr. Ishfaq Ahmad	None	Science Adviser, Hon. Minister of State
Chaudhry Imtiaz Safdar Waraich	PPP	Communications
Arbab Muhammad Zahir Khan	ANP	Defence
Sardar Salim Haider Khan	PPP	Defence Production
Ghulam Farid Kathia	PPP	Education
Mir Dost Muhammad Mazari	PPP	Water and Power
Rafique Ahmed Jamali	PPP	Food and Agriculture
Salman Bashir	Independent	Foreign policy and Geostrategic Affairs
Muhammad Afzal Sandhu	PPP	Public Health
Muhammad Tariq Anis	PPP	Housing and Work Force
Ayatollah Durrani	PPP	Industries and Machine Production
Syed Samsam Ali Shah Bokhari	PPP	Information and Mass Media Broadcasting
Tasneem Ahmed Qureshi	PPP	Interior and Internal Security
Abdul Raziq	FATA	Kashmir Affairs and Northern Areas
Masood Abbas	ANP	Local Township and Rural Development
Mahreen Anwar Raja	PPP	Parliamentary Affairs
Nabil Gabol	PPP	Ports and Shipping
Muhammad Jadam Mangrio	PML-F	Railways
Sardar Sarosh Khan	PPP	Water and Power generation
Ahsan Saddiqui	PML-N	Population Control
Imran Khan Qamro	PPP	Family Planning Affairs
