= Mian Marghoob Ahmad =

Pakistani politician

Member of the Provincial Assembly of the Punjab
- In office 15 August 2018 – 14 January 2023
- Constituency: PP-149 Lahore-VI
- In office 1 June 2013 – 31 May 2018
- Constituency: PP-150 (Lahore-XIV)

Member of the National Assembly of Pakistan
- In office 2008–2013
- Constituency: NA-121 (Lahore-IV)

Personal details
- Born: 1 January 1959 (age 67) Lahore, Punjab, Pakistan
- Party: PMLN (2008-present)

Punjab Assembly Lahore

Mian Marghoob Ahmad is a Pakistani politician who had been a Member of the Provincial Assembly of the Punjab, from June 2013 to May 2018 and from August 2018 to January 2023. He had been a member of the National Assembly of Pakistan from 2008 to 2013.

== Early life and education ==
He was born on 1 January 1959 in Lahore.

He has completed graduation.

== Political career ==
He was elected to the National Assembly of Pakistan from Constituency NA-121 (Lahore-IV) as a candidate of Pakistan Muslim League (N) (PML-N) in the 2008 Pakistani general election. He received 72,227 votes and defeated Aurangzeb Shaafi Burki, a candidate of Pakistan Peoples Party (PPP). In the same election, he ran for the seat of the Provincial Assembly of the Punjab as an independent candidate from Constituency PP-151 (Lahore-XV) but was unsuccessful. He received 7 votes and lost the seat to Ijaz Ahmed Khan, a candidate of PML-N.

He ran for the seat of the National Assembly as an independent candidate from Constituency NA-121 (Lahore-IV) in the 2013 Pakistani general election but was unsuccessful. He received 555 votes and lost the seat to Mehr Ishtiaq Ahmed.

He was elected to the Provincial Assembly of the Punjab from Constituency PP-150 (Lahore-XIV) Lahore as a candidate of PML-N in by-polls held in August 2013. He received 18,870 votes and defeated Mehr Wajid Azim, a candidate of Pakistan Tehreek-e-Insaf (PTI).

He was re-elected to Provincial Assembly of the Punjab as a candidate of PML-N from Constituency PP-149 (Lahore-VI) in the 2018 Pakistani general election.
