= National Reconciliation Ordinance =

Presidential ordinance in Pakistan

The National Reconciliation Ordinance (NRO; Urdu: قومی مفاہمت فرمان 2007ء) was a controversial ordinance issued by the former President of Pakistan, General Pervez Musharraf APML, on 5 October 2007 and former Prime Minister of Pakistan, Imran Khan founder and chairman of PTI, on 9 May 2023. It granted amnesty to politicians, political workers and bureaucrats who were accused of corruption, and wanted to leave country for their own profit embezzlement, money laundering, murder, and between 1 January 1986, and 12 October 1999, the time between two states of martial law in Pakistan. It was declared unconstitutional by the Supreme Court of Pakistan on 16 December 2009, saving the country from political crisis.

== Background ==
The ordinance aimed at "promoting national reconciliation, fostering mutual trust and confidence amongst holders of public office and removing the vestiges of political vendetta and victimization, and to make the election process more transparent". The NRO states:

Notwithstanding anything to the contrary in sub-section(1), the Federal Government or a Provincial Government may, before the judgment is pronounced by a trial court, withdraw from the prosecution of any person including an absconding accused who is found to be falsely involved for political reasons or through political victimization in any case initiated between 1st day of January, 1986 to 12th day of October, 1999 and upon such withdrawal clause (a) and clause (b) of sub-section (1) shall apply.

It is widely believed that the act was a measure to allow the former Prime Minister Benazir Bhutto to return to Pakistan without any legal consequences due to pending politically motivated corruption cases. However, Musharraf had said that it was necessary to build a reconciliatory theme in the political arena with the removal of such politically motivated cases. Musharraf stated in an interview that cases had been in the courts for a decade without any judgment being passed and were hampering political progress of virtually all political parties.

According to Transparency International, Pakistan is considered one of the most corrupt countries in the world. For the year 2009 it was ranked 139th out of 180 and had a score of 2.4 on the Corruption Perceptions Index.

Furthermore, some analyst believe 'US, the UK and Saudi Arabia underwrote a public amnesty which would enable popular politicians such as Benazir Bhutto to return to the country and counter the Taliban.'

== Subsequent developments ==
The former Chief Justice of Pakistan, Iftikhar Chaudhary, suspended this ordinance on 12 October 2007. But he was soon dismissed after Musharraf abrogated the constitution on 3 November 2007. The new Chief Justice, Abdul Hameed Dogar, revived the NRO on 27 February 2008.

=== Release of list of NRO beneficiaries ===
In November 2009, Government of Pakistan released the list of the beneficiaries of NRO on the directives of Prime Minister Syed Yousuf Raza Gilani. The total list was 8041 beneficiaries most of which were bureaucrats, along with a handful of politicians. Amongst the beneficiaries were 34 politicians while others were all personnel of the armed forces and/or bureaucrats. The cases also included some high-ranking politicians, such as the Ex-President Asif Ali Zardari and Ex-Prime Minister Yousuf Raza Gillani. The NRO was planned to be presented in the National Assembly but later due to the opposition of several major parties was not presented in the Assembly. According to State Minister for Law Afzal Sindhu in a news conference, the ordinance affected 8,041 people, including 34 politicians and 03 ambassadors.

== Dissolution of NRO by Supreme Court ==
On 16 December 2009, the Supreme Court of Pakistan declared NRO unconstitutional. A 17-member bench of the Supreme Court, headed by Chief Justice Iftikhar Muhammad Chaudhry, declared the ordinance null and void. The Supreme Court also said that all the cases disposed of because of the controversial ordinance now stand revived as of 5 October 2007 position. The court opined that the NRO "seems to be against national interests thus it violates the provisions of the constitution." Western diplomats subsequently expressed concern that Pakistan could face further instability due to this ruling, especially if Mr Zardari's political opponents try to remove him from office. However, the verdict was widely welcomed in Pakistan.

After this verdict, Pakistan's National Accountability Bureau asked the Interior Ministry to bar 248 people, including Interior Minister of Pakistan Rehman Malik, from leaving the country. The following day an arrest warrant was issued against Malik. Defence Minister of Pakistan Chaudhry Ahmad Mukhtar was stopped from departing the country on a trip to China at Islamabad airport. Writing in the Pakistani newspaper Dawn, columnist Cyril Almeida stated "It's chaos out there. Nobody knows what's going on. Everyone is trying to work out the ramifications of the court order."

The political crisis deepened as the government was paralysed and the country seemed to slide towards a coup with it being increasingly unclear whether the elected politicians, the judiciary or the military was running the country. The extent of the crisis led to speculation whether the Army had any role to play in this. The situation was described as a 'creeping coup'. Asma Jahangir, chairperson of Human Rights Commission of Pakistan, was quoted as saying 'It's complete (judicial) control now, the issue is whether the (democratic) system is going to pack up again.' In an editorial in Dawn she criticised the judiciary and called the judgement a 'witchhunt'. She also remarked 'long-term effects of the judgment could also be counter-productive; perpetrators are often viewed as victims if justice is not applied in an even-handed manner and if administered in undue haste with overwhelming zeal.'

In a hearing of NRO Case, the Supreme Court was told that government was looking for a lawyer upon which it could trust to run the government's side while the Chief Justice of Pakistan has asked the government to adopt all necessary measures otherwise the Prime Minister of Pakistan has to appear and proceed the case himself.

== NRO beneficiaries ==
Selected NRO beneficiaries include:

- Imran Khan (PTI)
- Asif Ali Zardari (PPP)
- Nawaz Sharif (PMLN)
- Shahid Khaqan Abbasi (AP)
- Hakim Ali Zardari
- Altaf Hussain (Politician) (MQM-L)
- Nisar Khuhro
- Rehman Malik
- Hussain Haqqani
- Nawaz Khokhar
- Chaudhry Ahmed Mukhtar
- Jehangir Bader
- Salman Farooqi
- Siraj Shamsuddin Siraj Shamsuddin
- Syed Muhammad Ali Shah
- Brigadier Imtiaz
- Ishrat-ul-Ebad
- Farooq Sattar (MQM-P)
- Saleem Shahzad
- Babar Ghouri
- Nusrat Bhutto (PPP)
- Several bureaucrats

Other than these there are hundreds of political as well as non-political persons who have benefited from this ordinance. The National Accountability Bureau (NAB) presented a list of 248 politicians and bureaucrats to the government, whose cases were cleared by NAB due to NRO.

== See also ==
- Ministry of Interior
- Exit Control List
- National Accountability Bureau
