= Hammad Azhar =

Pakistani politician

- محمد حماد اظہر
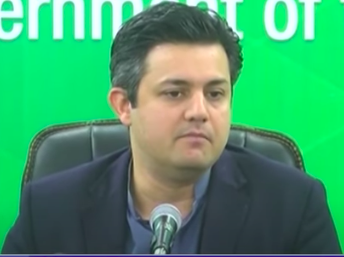

Federal Minister for Energy
- In office 17 April 2021 – 10 April 2022
- Prime Minister: Imran Khan
- Preceded by: Omar Ayub
- Succeeded by: Khurram Dastgir

Federal Minister for Finance & Revenue
- In office 29 March 2021 – 17 April 2021
- Prime Minister: Imran Khan
- Preceded by: Abdul Hafeez Shaikh
- Succeeded by: Shaukat Tarin

Federal Minister for Industries & Production
- In office 6 April 2020 – 16 April 2021
- Prime Minister: Imran Khan
- Preceded by: Abdul Razak Dawood (as Advisor)
- Succeeded by: Khusro Bakhtiar

Federal Minister for Economic Affairs
- In office 10 July 2019 – 6 April 2020
- Prime Minister: Imran Khan
- Preceded by: Abdul Hafeez Shaikh (as Advisor)
- Succeeded by: Khusro Bakhtiar

Minister of State for Revenue
- In office 11 September 2018 – 8 July 2019
- Prime Minister: Imran Khan
- Minister: Asad Umar (As Federal Minister); Abdul Hafeez Shaikh (As Advisor for Finance)

Member of the National Assembly of Pakistan
- In office 13 August 2018 – 17 January 2023
- Constituency: NA-126 (Lahore-IV)

President of PTI, Punjab, Pakistan
- In office 16 December 2023 – 2 April 2025
- Preceded by: Yasmin Rashid

Personal details
- Born: 10 August 1974 (age 52) Lahore, Punjab, Pakistan
- Spouse: Maryam Azhar
- Parent: Muhammad Azhar (father)
- Education: Aitchison College; Wellington College
- Alma mater: SOAS, University of London; BPP Law School; Lincoln's Inn

Muhammad Hammad Azhar (Urdu: محمد حماد اظہر) is a Pakistani politician from Pakistan Tehreek-e-Insaf. He was elected from NA-126 (Lahore-IV) in 2018 Pakistani general election and remained a member of National Assembly of Pakistan between August 2018 to January 2023. He served in various ministerial positions in Imran Khan ministry between 2018 and April 2022. He served as Energy Minister of Pakistan and Finance Minister of Pakistan between 16 April 2021 to 3 April 2022 and 29 March 2021 to 16 April 2021 respectively.

He also served as Federal Minister for Economic Affairs from 10 July 2019 to 5 April 2020, Federal Minister of Industries and Production from 6 April 2020 to 6 March 2021, Minister of State for Revenue from 11 September 2018 to 9 July 2019 and Federal Minister for Revenue from 8 July 2019 to 9 July 2019. Additionally, he served as the President of PTI in Punjab from 2023 to 2025.

== Early life and education ==
Hammad Azhar was born to the former Governor of Punjab (1990–1993) and later co-founder of Pakistan Muslim League (Q), Mian Muhammad Azhar, into a political Punjabi Arain family of Lahore. He has a sister, Asma Hadi.

He received his early education from the Aitchison College in Lahore and later was a pupil at Wellington College in Berkshire. He later graduated with a bachelor's degree in Development Economics from the SOAS, University of London and then completed his postgraduate diploma in Law from the BPP Law School.

He enrolled for the Bar Vocational Course in 2004 and was formally called to the Bar at The Honorable Society of Lincoln's Inn in 2005.

== Professional career ==
Hammad Azhar is a barrister by profession.

He has also been involved in his family-owned company AFCO Steel Industries, one of the largest and oldest steel manufacturing groups in Pakistan. It was established in Jalandhar, now in Indian Punjab, in the 1930s.

His other professional postings include:

- Asian Development Bank (ADB), Ex-Officio Member of the Board of Governors (since 2018)
- Asian Infrastructure Investment Bank (AIIB), Ex-Officio Member of the Board of Governors (since 2018)
- Islamic Development Bank (IsDB), Ex-Officio Member of the Board of Governors (since 2018)

== Political career ==
After refusing tickets from both the Pakistan People's Party (PPP) and the Pakistan Muslim League (N) (PML-N) in 2007, Azhar joined Pakistan Tehreek-e-Insaf (PTI) in 2011.

He ran for the seat of the National Assembly of Pakistan as a candidate of PTI from Constituency NA-121 (Lahore-IV) in the 2013 Pakistani general election but was unsuccessful. He received 68,307 votes and lost the seat to Mehr Ishtiaq Ahmed.

Azhar was elected to the National Assembly as a candidate of PTI from Constituency NA-126 (Lahore-IV) in the 2018 Pakistani general election.

On 11 September 2018, Azhar was inducted into the federal cabinet of Prime Minister Imran Khan and was appointed Minister of State for Revenue. On 11 June 2019, Hammad presented the 2019-20 annual budget of Pakistan in the National Assembly of Pakistan.

On 8 July 2019, Azhar was elevated to the post of Federal Minister and was appointed Federal Minister for Revenue. The next day, he ceased to hold the office of federal minister for Revenue Division and was appointed the federal minister for Economic Affairs Division.

On 6 April 2020 he was removed from the position of Federal Minister for Economic Affairs, and was given the portfolio of Federal Minister for Industries and Production.

On 12 June 2020, Hammad presented the Rs. 7,294.9 billion 2020-21 annual Corona budget of Pakistan in the National Assembly of Pakistan reflecting a reduction in its size by 11 percent from the budget estimates for fiscal 2019–20.

“Formulation and presentation of the budget in times of the coronavirus pandemic that besets the world at present and is on the ascent in Pakistan at the moment with total uncertainty about its descent is almost an impossible task, particularly for a developing country like Pakistan and therefore, the present budget can at best be viewed as 'work in progress' that would need a revision/tweaking as the economic fallout from the pandemic continues to unfold.”

On 29 March 2021, after the removal of Abdul Hafeez Shaikh from Federal Cabinet, Azhar was given additional charge of Federal Minister for Finance and Revenue.

On 17 April 2021, Shaukat Tareen was appointed Federal Minister for Finance and Revenue and Hammad Azhar was promoted as Federal Minister of Energy. This ministry is considered to be the most difficult due to rising circular debt and costly power agreements that require new negotiations.

On 16 December 2023, he was appointed acting President of PTI's provincial chapter in Punjab. He stepped down from the position in April 2025, arguing that he was being accused of obstructing the work of other party members and that there was a lack of freedom to control his constituency.

== Awards and recognition ==
In 2020, the World Economic Forum (WEF) named Hammad Azhar, then Minister for Economic Affairs, as one of its Young Global Leaders from South Asia. According to a press release, the WEF identifies the world's most promising leaders under the age of 40 who are driving innovation for positive change across civil society, arts, culture, government and business. Azhar had been named alongside 114 young global leaders.

== Writings ==
Hammad Azhar has written English-language articles and columns, including for The News International.
