= Hafizullah Cheema =

Hafizullah Cheema was a Pakistani politician who served in the federal cabinet of Prime Minister Zulfikar Ali Bhutto from 1975 to 1977. He also served as an adviser to the ministry of labour during the Gilani government.

== Career ==
On 10 January 1975, Cheema was appointed Minister for Labour, Health, Social Welfare and Population Planning. He remained in the position until 5 February 1976.

On 5 February 1976, Cheema was appointed as the Federal Minister for Railways. He remained in office until 8 March 1977.
