= 2020–21 Pakistan federal budget =

2020–2021 Federal Budget
- Submitted by: Hammad Azhar
- Submitted to: National Assembly
- Presented: 12 June 2020
- Parliament: Pakistan
- Party: Pakistan Tehreek e Insaf
- Finance minister: Abdul Hafeez Shaikh
- Treasurer: Ministry of Finance

The Federal budget 2020–2021 is the federal budget of Pakistan for the fiscal year beginning from 1 July 2020 and ending on 30 June 2021. The budget was presented in the Parliament by the Federal Minister Hammad Azhar. It is also called Corona budget as it was presented during the Corona Crisis. The government called the budget a Relief budget but major opposition parties PPP and PML-N called it People's enemy budget.

== Features ==
The total size of the budget is Rs. 7136 (US$25) billion.

Rs. 1289 (US$4.50) billion for defense,Rs. 83.3 (29¢ US) billion for education (7.9 per cent from higher than the last budget), Rs. 70 (24¢ US) billion were allocated for preventing coronavirus, Rs. 80 (28¢ US) billion for special economic zones. No new taxes were introduced in the budget. Foreign Minister Shah Mehmood Qureshi confirmed that defence spending was not raised for the second consecutive year.
