= Shaukat Tarin =

Pakistani politician

Shaukat Tarin شوکت ترین
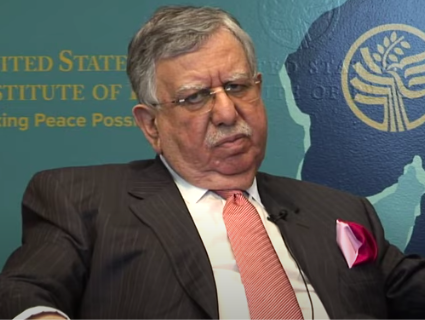
- Tarin in October 2021

Minister of Finance, Revenue & Economic Affairs
- In office 27 December 2021 – 10 April 2022
- President: Arif Alvi
- Prime Minister: Imran Khan
- Preceded by: Hammad Azhar
- Succeeded by: Miftah Ismail
- In office 16 April 2021 – 17 October 2021
- President: Arif Alvi
- Prime Minister: Imran Khan
- Preceded by: Hammad Azhar
- Succeeded by: Himself as Advisor
- In office 8 October 2008 – 22 February 2010
- President: Asif Ali Zardari
- Prime Minister: Yusuf Raza Gillani
- Preceded by: Naveed Qamar
- Succeeded by: Naveed Qamar (and he was succeeded by Abdul Hafeez Shaikh)

Member of Finance, Revenue & Economic Affairs Committee
- Incumbent
- Assumed office 18 April 2019
- Prime Minister: Imran Khan

President of the Union Bank (Pakistan)
- In office 2000 – 2006 Karachi Stock Exchange

Chairman of the Karachi Stock Exchange
- In office 2002–2008 Serving with Sadeq Sayeed
- Prime Minister: Shaukat Aziz

Advisor to Prime Minister on Finance and Revenue
- In office 17 October 2021 – 27 December 2021
- Prime Minister: Imran Khan

Member of the Senate of Pakistan
- In office 20 December 2021 – 10 December 2023
- President: Arif Alvi
- Prime Minister: Shahid Khaqan Abbasi; Imran Khan; Shehbaz Sharif

Personal details
- Born: Shaukat Fayyaz Ahmed Tarin; 1 October 1953 (age 73) Multan, Punjab, Pakistan
- Party: PPP (2025-present)
- Other political affiliations: PTI (2007-2023)
- Spouse: Razalia Tarin
- Relations: Jahangir Tareen (cousin) Azmat Tarin (brother) Col. Dr. Jamshaid Tarin (father)
- Children: 3
- Education: University of the Punjab (MBA), Forman Christian College University
- Profession: Banker

Shaukat Fayyaz Ahmed Tarin (Urdu: شوکت ترین; born 1 October 1953) is a Pakistani former senator and banker who served as Finance Minister of Pakistan from 2008 to 2010 in the Gillani cabinet and worked with the help of the Pakistan People's Party's cabinet members.

On 27 December 2021, he was appointed the Finance Minister of Pakistan again, replacing the recently appointed Hammad Azhar after a reshuffle in the Imran Khan ministry. He is the Member of the Senate of Pakistan since March 2018.

On 7 October 2008, he was appointed an adviser to the government and was elevated to the post of finance minister after being elected as a senator from Sindh on 27 July 2009. Tarin resigned from the ministry on 23 February 2010 to "raise equity from the market for Silkbank," which while working at finance ministry was "a clear conflict of interest."

Before his ministerial role, Tarin served as the country manager of CitiBank N.A Pakistan and did tenures as head of Habib Bank, Union Bank, and twice as chairman of Karachi Stock Exchange. He currently sits on the board of Silkbank.

On 17 October 2021, he was appointed Advisor to Prime Minister on Finance and Revenue. He served as federal minister for finance and revenue till 17 October 2021 because he was unable to be elected as senator.

== Early life and education ==
Tarin came from a Pashtun family that belongs to the Tareen tribe of Pashtuns born to an Pakistan Army Medical Corps doctor in Multan. He got his initial education from Army Cantonment schools all over Pakistan and later got his MBA from University of the Punjab.

== Banking career ==
He joined Citibank in 1975 and remained with it for 22 years rising to become its country manager in Thailand.

In 1997, then-PM Nawaz Sharif asked Tarin to turn around state-owned Habib Bank, for which he left the $1 million plus job in the United States. He, along with Zubyr Soomro at United Bank and Muhammad Mian Soomro at National Bank of Pakistan, were "successful in bringing the nationalised commercial banks (NCBs) back from virtual extinction."

He left HBL in 2000 to join Union Bank as its president. As the president of the Union Bank, Tarin was associated with the acquisition by Standard Chartered Bank of a 95.37% interest in Union Bank in September 2006. The amount paid was $487 million, in cash.

Shaukat Tarin has also been elected twice as chairman of Karachi Stock Exchange (KSE), the last one being in the year 2008.

Shaukat Tarin was a major stakeholder of Saudi Pak Commercial Bank (SPCB) and formed a consortium, along with senior banker Sadeq Sayeed, International Finance Corporation (IFC), BankMuscat, Nomura Holdings and Sinthos Capital to acquire an 86.55% stake in SPCB from Saudi Pak Industrial And Agricultural Investment Co. Ltd. for $213 million in cash on 31 March 2008. Subsequently, Saudi Pak was rebranded as Silkbank Limited on 1 June 2009 with a strategic focus on SME & Consumer financing for increased profitability.

== Political career ==
Shaukat Tarin was appointed adviser to the finance ministry of Pakistan with a status of federal minister, on 7 October 2008. Prior to this appointment, Tarin was serving as the President of Saudi-Pak Commercial Bank (presently, Silk Bank). On 27 July 2009, he was elected senator unopposed from Sindh and subsequently, he was elevated to finance minister of Pakistan. As such, he heads the Executive Committee of the National Economic Council (NEC) and the Economic Coordination Committee (ECC).

Tarin resigned from the ministry on 23 February 2010 to "raise equity from the market for Silkbank," which while working at finance ministry was "a clear conflict of interest."

He was appointed Federal Minister for finance and revenue affairs on 16 April 2021. On 20 December 2021, Tarin was elected as a senator from Khyber Pakhtunkhwa and on 27 December 2021, took oath as Federal Minister of Finance and Revenue.

Shaukat Tarin served as a member on the economic and finance committee from 18 April 2019 under then Prime Minister Imran Khan. Shaukat Tarin was also the convener of the committee to the Prime Minister.

== See also ==
- Silkbank Limited

Political offices
Preceded by Naveed Qamar	Finance Minister of Pakistan; 2008–2010	Succeeded by Abdul Hafeez Shaikh
