= Ahmad Saeed =

Pakistani politician and businessman

Chaudhary Ahmad Saeed
- Born: 11 January 1941; Lahore, Punjab, British India
- Died: 28 September 2018 (aged 77); Karachi, Pakistan
- Education: Forman Christian College
- Office: Chairman Servis Industries Limited
- Father: Chaudhry Muhammad Hussain
- Relatives: Chaudhry Ahmad Mukhtar (brother); Malik Amin Aslam (son in law); Sardar Ayaz Sadiq (cousin)

Chaudhry Ahmad Saeed (11 January 1941 – 28 September 2018) was a Pakistani politician and businessman who served as the chairman of the Pakistan International Airlines from 2001 to 2005. He owned Servis Industries Limited and served as the chairman of its philanthropic arm, Shalamar Hospital.

== Early life and education ==
Chaudhry Ahmad Saeed was born to Chaudhry Muhammad Hussain, who served as a chairman of the Pakistan Cricket Board and co-founded Service Industries Limited. He was educated at Forman Christian College.

== Career ==
Ahmad Saeed began his career in politics in 1975. In 1977, he was elected as a member of the Punjab Assembly from Gujrat, affiliated with Pakistan Peoples Party. In 1988, he was appointed as the chairman of the Agricultural Development Bank of Pakistan by Benazir Bhutto government, where he served until 1990. In the early 1990s, he quit politics due to differences with his brother Ahmad Mukhtar.

In 2000, Saeed was appointed as the managing director and later chairman of the Pakistan International Airlines by his college friend, Pervez Musharraf, where he served until 2005.

During his career, Saeed also served as a president of Pakistan Cycling Federation, Pakistan Bodybuilding Federation, and Zarai Taraqiati Bank Limited.

== Personal life ==
His wife's name is Nighat Saeed. Both his sons (Arif Saeed and Omar Saeed) continue his business, while his daughter, Asma Ramday, owns well-known restaurants: The Polo Lounge and "The Pantry." He also has two daughters Zara Ahmed and Amna Amin. He has thirteen grandchildren namely, Shamsher Aslam, Hussain Aslam, Sarah Aslam, Natalia Saeed, Nafisa Saeed, Hamza Saeed, Ahmad Saeed, Noor Saeed, Ayesha Saeed, Asfandyar Ramday, Amnaan Ramday, Zenab Ahmed, and Faraz Ahmed.

His brother Chaudhry Ahmad Mukhtar was cabinet member from Pakistan Peoples Party. His son in law Amer Ali Ahmed was the Former Deputy Commissioner and former Chief Commissioner Islamabad. His second son-in-law, Mustafa Ramday has served as Advocate general of Punjab, his other son-in-law being Malik Amin Aslam, served as an advisor to Imran Khan.

Saeed died on 28 September 2018.

== Awards and recognition ==
- Sitara-i-Imtiaz (Star of Excellence) Award by the President of Pakistan in 2006
- Honorary doctorate degree was awarded to him by Forman Christian College for his services to that college in 2012
