= Mehr Ishtiaq Ahmed =

Pakistani politician

- مہراشتیاق احمد

Member of the National Assembly of Pakistan
- In office 1 June 2013 – 31 May 2018
- Constituency: NA-121 (Lahore-IV)

Personal details
- Born: September 8, 1964 (age 62) Lahore, Punjab, Pakistan
- Other political affiliations: PMLN (1994)

Mehar Ishtiaq Ahmad (Urdu: مہر اشتیاق احمد; born 8 September 1957) is a Pakistani politician who had been a member of the National Assembly of Pakistan, from June 2013 to May 2018. Previously he had been a member of the Provincial Assembly of Punjab from 2002 to 2013.

== Early life and education ==
He was born on 8 September 1957 in Lahore.

He earned the degree of Bachelor of Commerce in 1982 from University of the Punjab.

== Political career ==
He ran for the seat of the National Assembly of Pakistan as an independent candidate from Constituency NA-121 (Lahore-IV) in the 2002 Pakistani general election but was unsuccessful. He received 131 votes and lost the seat to Farid Ahmad Paracha, a candidate of Muttahida Majlis-e-Amal. In the same election, he was elected to the Provincial Assembly of Punjab as a candidate of Pakistan Muslim League (N) (PML-N) from Constituency PP-150 (Lahore-XIV). He received 18,197 votes and defeated Asghar Ali Gill, a candidate of Pakistan Muslim League (Q) (PML-Q).

He was re-elected to the Provincial Assembly of Punjab as a candidate of PML-N from Constituency PP-150 (Lahore-XIV) in the 2008 Pakistani general election. He received 34,053 votes and defeated Asif Mahmood Nagira, a candidate of Pakistan Peoples Party (PPP).

He was elected to the National Assembly as a candidate of PML-N from Constituency NA-121 (Lahore-IV) in the 2013 Pakistani general election. He received 114,474 votes and defeated Hammad Azhar, a candidate of Pakistan Tehreek-e-Insaf (PTI). In the same election, he was re-elected to the Provincial Assembly of Punjab as a candidate of PML-N from Constituency PP-150 (Lahore-XIV). He received 57,232 votes and defeated Mehar Wajid Azeem, a candidate of PTI. He retained National Assembly seat.
