= NA-129 Lahore-XIII =

Constituency of the National Assembly of Pakistan

- Constituency for the National Assembly of Pakistan
- Region: Lahore City area of Lahore District
- Electorate: 528,414

Current constituency
- Party: PMLN
- Member: Hafiz Mian Muhammad Numan
- Created from: NA-129 Lahore-IV

NA-129 Lahore-XIII (این اے-129 لاہور-13) is a constituency for the National Assembly of Pakistan.

== Election 2002 ==
General elections were held on 10 October 2002. Farid Ahmad Paracha of Muttahida Majlis-e-Amal won by 30,326 votes.

General election 2002: NA-121 Lahore-IV
Party	Candidate	Votes	%	±%
MMA	Farid Ahmed Piracha	30,326	37.80	
PML(Q)	Mian Muhammad Jehangir	17,956	22.38	
PPP	Aurangzeb Shafi Barki	15,778	19.67	
PML(Z)	Faaiz Rahim Khan	12,089	15.07	
PTI	Amir Saleem Bhatti	3,373	4.20	
Others	Others (five candidates)	710	0.88	
Turnout		81,918	31.92	
Total valid votes		80,232	97.94	
Rejected ballots		1,686	2.06	
Majority		12,370	15.42	
Registered electors		256,605		

== Election 2008 ==
General elections were held on 18 February 2008. Mian Marghoob Ahmad of PML-N won by 72,227 votes.

General election 2008: NA-121 Lahore-IV
Party	Candidate	Votes	%	±%
PML(N)	Mian Marghoob Ahmad	72,227	66.60	
PPP	Aurangzeb Shafi Barki	27,934	25.76	
PML(Q)	Mian Muhammad Asif	7,559	6.97	
Others	Others (five candidates)	733	0.67	
Turnout		110,314	36.29	
Total valid votes		108,453	98.31	
Rejected ballots		1,861	1.69	
Majority		44,293	40.84	
Registered electors		303,962		
PML(N) gain from MMA				

== Election 2013 ==
General elections were held on 11 May 2013. Mehar Ishtiaq Ahmad of PML-N won by 114,474 votes and became the member of National Assembly.

General election 2013: NA-121 Lahore-IV
Party	Candidate	Votes	%	±%
PML(N)	Mehar Ishtiaq Ahmad	114,474	57.84	
PTI	Hammad Azhar	68,307	34.52	
Others	Others (twenty five candidates)	15,125	7.64	
Turnout		201,145	51.78	
Total valid votes		197,906	98.39	
Rejected ballots		3,239	1.61	
Majority		46,167	23.32	
Registered electors		388,441		
PML(N) hold				

== Election 2018 ==
General elections were held on 25 July 2018.

General election 2018: NA-126 Lahore-IV
Party	Candidate	Votes	%	±%
PTI	Hammad Azhar	105,734	46.30	
PML(N)	Mehr Ishtiaq Ahmed	102,677	44.96	
Others	Others (three candidates)	19,954	8.74	
Turnout		231,354	52.26	
Total valid votes		228,365	98.71	
Rejected ballots		2,989	1.29	
Majority		3,057	1.34	
Registered electors		442,729		
PTI gain from PML(N)				

== Election 2024 ==
General elections are to be held on 8 February 2024. Mian Muhammad Azhar won the election with 103,739 votes.

General election 2024: NA-129 Lahore-XIII
Party	Candidate	Votes	%	±%
PTI	Mian Muhammad Azhar (Note: Filed nomination papers as PTI candidate but ECP allowed him to run as an Independent)	103,739	49.49	▲3.19
PML(N)	Muhammad Numan	71,546	34.13	▼10.83
TLP	Bilal Liaqat	19,384	9.25	▲2.08
Others	Others (sixteen candidates)	14,935	7.13	
Turnout		213,387	40.36	▼11.90
Total valid votes		209,604	98.04	
Rejected ballots		3,683	1.96	
Majority		32,193	15.36	▲14.02
Registered electors		528,414		

== By-election 2025 ==
A by-election was held on 23 November 2025 due to the death of Mian Muhammad Azhar, the previous member from this seat.

By-election 2025: NA-129 Lahore-XIII
Party	Candidate	Votes	%	±%
PML(N)	Hafiz Mian Muhammad Numan	63,441	61.31	
PTI	Arslan Ahmed	29,099	28.12	
PML(Q)	Bajjash Khan Niazi	6,264	6.05	
TLP	Waqas Ahmed	2,813	2.72	
Others	Others (thirteen candidates)	1,859	1.80	
Turnout		104,232	18.67	
Total valid votes		103,476	99.28	
Rejected ballots		756	0.72	
Majority		34,342	33.19	
Registered electors		558,364		

== See also ==
- NA-128 Lahore-XII
- NA-130 Lahore-XIV
