= NA-221 Tando Muhammad Khan =

Constituency of the National Assembly of Pakistan

- Constituency for the National Assembly of Pakistan
- Region: Tando Muhammad Khan District
- Electorate: 274,941

Current constituency
- Party: Pakistan People's Party
- Member(s): Naveed Qamar
- Created from: NA-222 Hyderabad-V

NA-221 Tando Muhammad Khan (این اے-221، ٹنڈو محمد خان) is a constituency for the National Assembly of Pakistan.

== Assembly Segments ==
Constituency number	Constituency	District	Current MPA	Party
66	PS-66 Tando Muhammad Khan-I	Tando Muhammad Khan District	Syed Aijaz Hussain Shah	PPP
67	PS-67 Tando Muhammad Khan-II	Tando Muhammad Khan District	Khurram Karim Soomro	PPP

== Members of Parliament ==
=== 2018–2023: NA-228 Tando Muhammad Khan ===
Election	Member	Party
2018	Naveed Qamar	PPPP

=== 2024–present: NA-221 Tando Muhammad Khan ===
Election	Member	Party
2024	Naveed Qamar	PPPP

== Election 2002 ==
General elections were held on 10 October 2002. Naveed Qamar of PPP won by 53,075 votes.

General election 2002: NA-222 Hyderabad-V
Party	Candidate	Votes	%	±%
PPP	Naveed Qamar	53,705	58.06	
PML(Q)	Pir Sajjad Saeed Jan Sirhandi	34,627	37.43	
Others	Others (five candidates)	4,173	4.51	
Turnout		94,299	35.97	
Total valid votes		92,505	98.10	
Rejected ballots		1,794	1.90	
Majority		19,078	20.63	
Registered electors		262,149		

== Election 2008 ==
General elections were held on 18 February 2008. Naveed Qamar of PPP won by 84,041 votes.

General election 2008: NA-222 Hyderabad-V
Party	Candidate	Votes	%	±%
PPP	Naveed Qamar	84,041	74.05	
PML(Q)	Pir Sajjad Saeed Jan Sirhandi	26,391	23.25	
Others	Others (seven candidates)	3,058	2.70	
Turnout		115,690	36.28	
Total valid votes		113,490	98.10	
Rejected ballots		2,200	1.90	
Majority		57,650	50.80	
Registered electors		318,867		
PPP hold				

== Election 2013 ==
General elections were held on 11 May 2013. Naveed Qamar of PPP won by 100,095 votes and became the member of National Assembly.

General election 2013: NA-222 Hyderabad-V
Party	Candidate	Votes	%	±%
PPP	Naveed Qamar	100,095	68.20	
PML(F)	Pir Sajjad Saeed Jan Sirhandi	32,224	21.96	
Others	Others (eighteen candidates)	14,451	9.84	
Turnout		153,387	58.98	
Total valid votes		146,770	95.69	
Rejected ballots		6,617	4.31	
Majority		67,871	46.24	
Registered electors		260,060		
PPP hold				

== Election 2018 ==
General elections were held on 25 July 2018.

General election 2018: NA-228 Tando Muhammad Khan
Party	Candidate	Votes	%	±%
PPP	Naveed Qamar	76,067	54.30	
GDA	Mir Ali Nawaz Talpur	45,159	32.24	
Others	Others (six candidates)	18,850	13.46	
Turnout		147,114	53.51	
Total valid votes		140,076	95.22	
Rejected ballots		7,038	4.78	
Majority		30,908	22.06	
Registered electors		274,941		
PPP hold		Swing	N/A	

== Election 2024 ==
Elections were held on 8 February 2024. Naveed Qamar won the election with 111,738 votes.

General election 2024: NA-221 Tando Muhammad Khan
Party	Candidate	Votes	%	±%
PPP	Naveed Qamar	111,738	68.58	▲14.28
PTI	Muhammad Irfan (Note: Filed nomination papers as PTI candidate but ECP allowed him to run as an Independent)	23,840	14.63	▲3.60
Others	Others (fifteen candidates)	27,360	16.79	
Turnout		172,087	48.28	▲5.23
Total valid votes		162,938	94.68	
Rejected ballots		9,149	5.32	
Majority		97,898	56.89	▲34.83
Registered electors		356,444		
PPP hold				

== See also ==
- NA-220 Hyderabad-III
- NA-222 Badin-I
