= Mian Muhammad Azhar =

Pakistani politician (1942–2025)

- میاں محمد اظہر

24th Governor of Punjab
- In office 6 August 1990 – 25 April 1993
- President: Ghulam Ishaq Khan
- Preceded by: General (Retd) Tikka Khan
- Succeeded by: Chaudhry Altaf Hussain

President of PML(Q)
- In office 1999–2003
- Succeeded by: Chaudhry Shujaat Hussain

Mayor of Lahore
- In office 1987–1990
- Prime Minister: Muhammad Khan Junejo; Benazir Bhutto; Nawaz Sharif

President of Pakistan Football Federation
- In office 1990–2003
- Succeeded by: Faisal Saleh Hayat

Member of National Assembly of Pakistan
- In office 29 February 2024 – 22 July 2025
- Preceded by: Hammad Azhar
- Succeeded by: Hafiz Mian Muhammad Numan
- Constituency: NA-129 Lahore-XIII
- In office 1997–1999
- Preceded by: Nawaz Sharif
- Succeeded by: Mian Jalil Ahmad Sharaqpuri
- Constituency: NA-92 (Lahore-I)
- In office 1988–1991
- Preceded by: Nawaz Sharif
- Succeeded by: Nawaz Sharif
- Constituency: NA-95 (Lahore-IV)

Personal details
- Born: 1942
- Died: 22 July 2025 (aged 82–83) Lahore, Punjab, Pakistan
- Party: PTI (2011–2025)
- Children: 2, inc. Hammad Azhar
- Education: Hailey College of Commerce

Mian Muhammad Azhar (Urdu: میاں محمد اظہر) (1942 – 22 July 2025) was a Pakistani politician and a businessman representing Pakistan Tehreek-e-Insaf. He was a member of the National Assembly of Pakistan, serving since February 2024. He was from an Arain family of Lahore, He was Governor of Punjab (1990–1993) and the founder of PML-Q, of which he was also president. He was one of the largest steel manufacturers of Pakistan and was the CEO of Afco Steel Industries. He was also the mayor of Lahore between 1987 and 1991. Azhar was the father of former federal minister Hammad Azhar.

== Personal life ==
Azhar was born on 1942 in Lahore to Mian Fazal Muhammad. He studied at the Hailey College of Commerce in Lahore.

He is the father of two children, a daughter named Asma Hadi and a son, Hammad Azhar.

== Political career ==
Being a close aide of Nawaz Sharif in the past, he was also awarded the National Assembly ticket from NA-95 Lahore-IV, the seat vacated by Nawaz Sharif after the 1988 general elections. Azhar won his seat as a candidate of Islami Jamhoori Ittehad. In 1990, after the dismissal of Benazir Bhutto's first government, he replaced Gen (Rtd.) Tikka Khan as the Governor of Punjab and held the office till 25 April 1993. He, however, left the office, which Muslim League insiders said, was due to differences with Sharif.

In the 1997 general elections, he was elected as MNA on the PML-N ticket from NA-92 (Lahore-I). His relations with Sharif got bitter gradually and finally with the dismissal of Nawaz Sharif's government, he became the head of a new faction of the Muslim League called PML-Q. He met President Pervez Musharraf on 25 June 2001, thus becoming the first Pakistani politician to do so.

In the 2002 general elections, while he was a strong candidate for the slot of prime minister, he nonetheless, in a dramatic way, lost the National Assembly elections from both seats of Lahore and Sheikhupura. In NA-118 (Lahore-I), he was defeated by independent candidate, Hafiz Salman Butt, who was supported by PML-N and Jamaat-e-Islami, whereas in NA-132 (Sheikhupura-II), he was beaten by PML-N's Mian Jalil Ahmad Sharaqpuri.

Meanwhile, his party managed to form the national government as well as ruling in two provinces amid charges of massive rigging. Without a parliamentary seat, he was replaced by Shujaat Hussain as head of PLM-Q. He also failed to win a seat in the 2008 elections.

He joined the Pakistan Tehreek-e-Insaf (PTI) in October 2011.

He was re-elected to the National Assembly from NA-129 Lahore-XIII as an independent candidate supported by PTI in the 2024 Pakistani general election. He received 103,739 votes and defeated Muhammad Numan, a candidate of PML(N).

== Pakistan Football Federation ==
Pakistani football became a hotbed for politics in the early 1990s. In 1990, Pakistan Football Federation held its general elections in which Azhar won the presidency by a margin of one vote, beating the Pakistan Peoples Party leader Faisal Saleh Hayat. Azhar was instrumental in ousting PFF General Secretary Hafiz Salman Butt (a Member of National Assembly of Jamaat-e-Islami) due to political rifts and alleged abuse of power.

Azhar governed the federation till the 2003 elections, when he was beaten by Hayat, who was supported by Butt. By that time, Azhar had fallen out of favour from the pro-Musharraf PML-Q while Hayat's own pro-Musharraf PPP faction had been growing in power in the run-up to the 2002 General Elections after which he became the Interior Minister of Pakistan.

== Death ==
Azhar died following a prolonged illness in Lahore, on 22 July 2025, at the age of 83.

Political offices
Preceded by Tikka Khan	Governor of Punjab; 1990–1993	Succeeded by Chaudhary Altaf Hussain
