= Hafiz Mian Muhammad Numan =

Pakistani politician

Hafiz Mian Muhammad Noman

Member of the National Assembly of Pakistan
- Incumbent
- Assumed office 25 November 2025
- Preceded by: Mian Muhammad Azhar
- Constituency: NA-129 Lahore-XIII

Personal details
- Born: Lahore, Punjab, Pakistan
- Party: PMLN (2025-present)
- Occupation: Politician

Hafiz Mian Muhammad Numan is a Pakistani politician who has been a member of the National Assembly of Pakistan since November 2025.

He was elected to the National Assembly as a candidate of the Pakistan Muslim League (N) (PML-N) from Constituency NA-129 Lahore-XIII in a by-election held on 23 November 2025. He received 63,441 votes and defeated independent candidate Arslan Ahmad, who received 29,099 votes. The seat became vacant due to the disqualification of a Pakistan Tehreek-e-Insaf (PTI) lawmaker following convictions related to the May 2023 riots.

== See also ==
- List of members of the 16th National Assembly of Pakistan
