= Silkbank =

Pakistani bank (1994–2025)

Silkbank Limited
- Formerly: Prudential Commercial Bank (1994–2001); Saudi-Pak Commercial Bank (2001–2008)
- Company type: Public
- Traded as: PSX: SILK (1995–2025)
- Industry: Banking
- Founded: June 1994; 31 years ago
- Defunct: 11 March 2025
- Fate: Merged into United Bank Limited (2025)
- Successor: United Bank Limited
- Headquarters: Karachi-75600, Pakistan
- Key people: Shahram Raza Bakhtiari (CEO)
- Products: Loans; Credit Cards; Debit Cards; Savings; Consumer Banking; Business Banking; Islamic Banking
- Revenue: ▼ Rs. 8.283 billion (US$30 million) (2023)
- Operating income: ▼ Rs. 20.655 billion (US$74 million) (2023)
- Net income: ▼ Rs. 12.786 billion (US$46 million) (2023)
- Total assets: ▼ Rs. 292.070 billion (US$1.0 billion) (2023)
- Total equity: ▼ Rs. 26.352 billion (US$94 million) (2023)
- Owner: Arif Habib Corporation (28.23%); Shaukat Tarin (11.55%); Zulqarnain Nawaz Chattha (7.75%); International Finance Corporation (7.74%); Nomura (3.93%); Bank Muscat (3.48%)
- Website: silkbank.com.pk
- Footnotes / references Financials as of 31 December 2023

Silkbank Limited was a Pakistani commercial bank headquartered in Karachi. Founded in 1994 as Prudential Commercial Bank, it was renamed as Saudi Pak Commercial Bank in 2001 and as Silkbank in 2008. It was the smallest bank in Pakistan, with a reportedly "outsize role" in consumer lending.

In 2024, the State Bank of Pakistan approved Silkbank's merger with United Bank Limited (UBL). The process was finalized in March 2025, with Silkbank officially integrating into the UBL through a share-swap agreement.

== History ==
Silkbank was founded in 1994 as Prudential Commercial Bank. It began commercial operations on May 7, 1995. It was subsequently listed on the Karachi Stock Exchange.

In September 2001, Saudi Pak Industrial and Agricultural Investment Company acquired Prudential Commercial Bank and renamed it as Saudi Pak Commercial Bank.

In March 2008, a consortium comprising International Finance Corporation, Bank of Muscat, Nomura, and Sinthos Capital, led by Pakistani banker Shaukat Tarin, acquired a majority stake in Saudi Pak Bank for $213 million. In June 2008, the bank changed its name to Silk Bank Limited. The name Silkbank was created by the French namer Olivier Auroy.

In 2015, Arif Habib Corporation acquired a 28.23 percent stake in the bank.

In March 2024, Silkbank Limited announced its merger with United Bank Limited (UBL) after both banks reached an agreement. On March 10, 2025, the State Bank of Pakistan (SBP) officially sanctioned the amalgamation of Silkbank with UBL under Section 48 of the Banking Companies Ordinance 1962. The merger became effective on March 11, 2025, fully integrating Silkbank's operations into UBL. As part of the agreement, UBL issued new shares to Silkbank shareholders at a swap ratio of 1 UBL share for every 325 Silkbank shares.
