= Chaudhry Muhammad Hussain =

Pakistani industrialist

Chaudhry Muhammad Hussain was a Pakistani industrialist and cricket administrator who served as the Chairman of the Pakistan Cricket Board (PCB) between April 1977 and July 1978. He was the co-founder of Service Industries Limited.

He had three sons, including Ahmad Saeed and Ahmad Mukhtar.
