= Ijaz Butt =

Pakistani cricketer (1938–2023)

Personal information
- Full name: Mohammed Ijaz Butt
- Born: 10 March 1938; Sialkot, Punjab, British India
- Died: 3 August 2023 (aged 85); Lahore, Punjab, Pakistan
- Batting: Right-handed
- Role: Wicket-keeper, opening batsman

International information
- National side: Pakistan (1959–1962)
- Test debut (cap 30): 20 February 1959 v West Indies
- Last Test: 16 August 1962 v England

Domestic team information
- Years: Team
- 1955/56–1959/60: Pakistan Universities
- 1959/60–1964/65: Lahore
- 1959/60–1961/62: Rawalpindi
- 1963/64: Multan
- 1964/65–1967/68: Lahore Reds

Career statistics
Competition	Test	First-class
Matches	8	67
Runs scored	279	3,842
Batting average	19.92	34.30
100s/50s	0/1	7/12
Top score	58	161
Balls bowled	–	257
Wickets	–	3
Bowling average	–	49.33
5 wickets in innings	–	0
10 wickets in match	–	0
Best bowling	–	1/21
Catches/stumpings	5/0	52/20
- Source: CricketArchive, 23 September 2010

Mohammed Ijaz Butt (Urdu: اعجاز بٹ; 10 March 1938 – 3 August 2023) was a Pakistani cricketer who played in eight Test matches from 1959 to 1962. A wicket keeper and right-handed opening batsman, he scored 279 runs from his brief Test career at a modest batting average of 19.92, however he was a capable wicket keeper with a first-class cricket career for Lahore, Multan, Punjab and Rawalpindi where he scored 3,842 runs at 34.30 with a best of 161.

On 6 October 2008, President of Pakistan Asif Ali Zardari, patron of the Pakistan Cricket Board (PCB), appointed Butt as chairman of the PCB. He was involved in several controversies during his term, at a time when security concerns—including a shooting incident involving the Sri Lankan tour bus—stripped Pakistan of several international fixtures, and he made a number of attacks on PCB officials and the Senate of Pakistan.

== Playing career ==
Ijaz Butt was born in Sialkot, Punjab on 10 March 1938. He began his first-class career against a touring Marylebone Cricket Club squad on 16 January 1956 while playing for Pakistan Universities. Batting at number three, he scored 35 and 97, falling three short of a debut century thanks to the bowling of Billy Sutcliffe and the catching hands of Ken Barrington. The match ended in a draw. A month later he faced the MCC once more, this time for Punjab: he scored 43 and 18 as the MCC triumphed by an innings and 29 runs. Butt went on to make several successful appearances in the Quaid-e-Azam Trophy over the winter of 1956/57, scoring 225 runs at 56.25 including a maiden century of 147 runs. He promptly toured the West Indies but only featured in one first-class match before returning to the 1958/59 Quaid-e-Azam Trophy where he had a less successful second season: 73 runs from three matches at 24.33, failing to pass 50. He nevertheless went straight into the Test team for the home series against the West Indies.

Butt played Test cricket between 1959 and 1962. He made his Test debut at Karachi on 20 February 1959. The West Indies, bowled out cheaply for 146 in the first innings, conceded a 10-wicket defeat with Butt scoring 14 and 41 not out as a specialist opener. He scored two, 21, 47* and two in the rest of the series. Between 26 March and 4 December he played two more Tests against Australia, scoring a career-best 58 in the second Test. He was then left out of the team until 1962, where he toured England, playing in three of the five Test matches. He struggled, scoring 10, 33, one, six, 10 and six before being dropped.

Following the end of his international career, despite scoring over 1,000 first-class runs in the England tour including two centuries, he made only sporadic appearances in Pakistani domestic cricket. He appeared in only three Quaid-e-Azam Trophy matches between 1963 and 1965; an invitational XI match for the Punjab Governor against Pakistan Universities in 1966; Pakistan versus The Rest in 1967; and lastly one appearance in the Ayub Trophy on 15 January 1968 where he scored 40 and 15 for the Lahore Reds.

== Corporate career ==
In 1977, he served as the president of the Lahore Chamber of Commerce and Industry.

He also worked as the director new projects at Service Industries Pakistan, expanding it to one of the largest manufacturers of footwear and motor cycle / cycle tyres and tubes. He was a director on the board of Servis Tyres.

== Administrative career ==
In 1982, Butt was appointed manager for the Pakistani winter tour of Australia, and in 1984 the secretary of the then Board of Control for Cricket in Pakistan, a position he held until 1988 along with the presidency of the Lahore City Cricket Association.

In October 2008, he was named chairman of the Pakistan Cricket Board (PCB). His initial actions were to suggest the possibility of neutral venues to preserve international cricket during a time of tenuous security conditions within Pakistan: "The holding of the Champions Trophy in Pakistan depends on the security condition of the country and if the current indefinite situation prevails further we may consider the option to play on alternate venues." He expressed relief when the 2009 Champions Trophy appeared to be going ahead in Pakistan despite security risks, and "made a series of startling revelations" about discussions with the International Cricket Council about merging with the Indian Premier League.

Pakistan, however, received little support as potential hosts of the Champions Trophy, a fact on which Butt expressed surprise. He warned that a divide would occur in the world of cricket should sub-continent cricket tours be marginalised. India later cancelled their tour to Pakistan, though Butt was hoping to host Australia after the latter team expressed an interest. In October 2008, he also asked questions of the financial security of the previous PCB officials, and speculated on the removal of Geoff Lawson, then Pakistani coach, from his position. Two days later, however, he reversed his position by stating he was "duty-bound to fully back Lawson and to take care of all his liabilities." Shafqat Naghmi, PCB Chief Operating Officer, also threatened to sue Butt over allegations that the former was stealing official documents.

=== Loss of the World Cup ===
Security concerns did not lessen, however, and Javed Miandad's resignation as director-general of the PCB resulted in traded accusations between himself and Butt at a Senate of Pakistan meeting. Butt refused to step down, and attacked the senate as a body with little actual legal power over the PCB. The senate nevertheless moved a resolution for a change in the PCB management. However, Butt remained in his position. Following an attack on a touring Sri Lanka cricket team in early 2009, Butt admitted in a public statement the difficulty international teams had in coming to the country, but accused ICC referee Chris Broad of exaggerating the problems. ICC President David Morgan, however, agreed with Broad's assessment. The 2011 Cricket World Cup was duly moved out of Pakistan.

Butt continued to meet with the PCB board to regain the World Cup, to no avail, despite a legal battle which lasted until August. Eventually an out of court settlement of 18 million US dollars was agreed upon; Butt calling it "the best possible solution." Concurrently, the PCB under Butt dissolved the national selection panel and removed Saleem Altaf from his position as chief operating officer. The summer tour of Sri Lanka was also marred by match-fixing allegations over which the PCB sought legal advice. The ICC's Anti-Corruption and Security Unit eventually cleared the Pakistan players of having had any contact with bookmakers.

Towards the winter of 2009, Butt also came up against Younis Khan in a dispute over the captaincy, with Khan taking time out of the game. By January 2010, however, Butt ruled that a new captain would be chosen following the tour of Australia, with Khan quitting the captaincy. Further match fixing claims arose in February, and Butt promised action against the players involved following the report of an inquiry committee which investigated Pakistan's whitewash defeat during the tour of Australia. Further match fixing and financial corruption accusations followed for both Butt and the PCB in 2010. Nevertheless, the ICC announced on 11 February the awarding of a medal for Butt for services to cricket.

=== 2010 England tour ===
Though Butt had deflected accusations of match fixing earlier in February 2010 during Pakistan's tour of Australia, the 2010 tour of England was publicly marred by controversial match fixing allegations involving a number of Pakistan players and their actions during the One Day Internationals against England and the Test series against the host nation and against Australia. Scotland Yard confirmed on 17 September that it had questioned Pakistan players Salman Butt, Mohammad Asif, Mohammad Amir and Wahab Riaz over allegations of accepting bribes, and that the police had passed evidence to the Crown Prosecution Service. Several Pakistani players were suspended. Initially, Ijaz Butt had supported the prosecution of Amir, stating that "his board will not make any appeals for leniency", however on 19 September he attacked the England cricket team during a press conference, accusing them of a conspiracy to "defraud Pakistan cricket" by accepting their own bribes. He stated that:

This is not a conspiracy to defraud bookies but a conspiracy to defraud Pakistan and Pakistan cricket... We have taken it in hand to start our own investigations. We will shortly reveal the names of the people, the parties and the bodies involved in this sinister conspiracy and we also reserve the right to sue them for damages... There is loud and clear talk in bookie circles that some English players have taken enormous amounts of money to lose the match [the third ODI]. No wonder there was such a collapse.

The remarks provoked a backlash from the England and Wales Cricket Board as well as England coach Andy Flower and captain Andrew Strauss. The ECB announced that it would be taking legal action against Butt for his allegations, though the tour would continue despite several England players' reluctance to participate. There were several calls for Butt to resign, however he refused. Wajid Shamsul Hasan, the Pakistan's high commissioner, defended Butt, calling the disagreement "a very innocent argument" and denying relationships with the United Kingdom were adversely affected. The England team later made official their demand for an apology in a letter sent to Butt, promising legal action without further warning if their request went unfulfilled. Butt arrived in London in late September vowing not to retract his comments in the run up to a meeting with the lawyers of three suspended Pakistan players; however, he later reversed course and retracted his statement. He was nevertheless recalled by the PCB for an explanation, amid speculation that his future as chairman remained tenuous. The ICC board of directors discussed sacking him in a meeting in Dubai should he not accept new anti-corruption measures.

In October 2011, following the expiration of his three-year term in office as PCB Chairman, he was replaced by Zaka Ashraf.

== Death ==
Butt died in Lahore on 3 August 2023, at age 85.
