= Naveed Qamar =

Pakistani politician

Syed Naveed Qamar
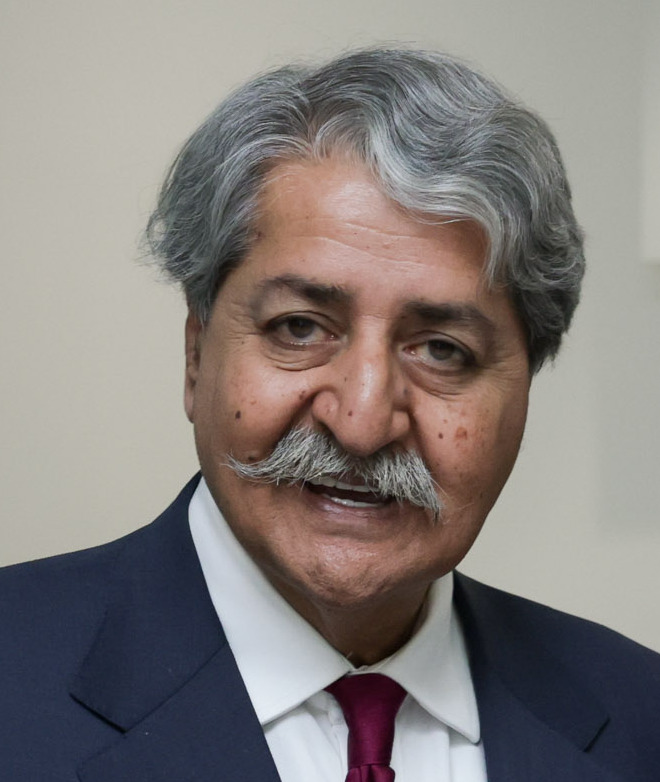
- Naveed Qamar in 2025

Federal Minister of Commerce
- In office 19 April 2022 – 10 August 2023

Chairman Standing Committee on Ministry of Railways (Pakistan)
- In office 2013–2018

Minister of Defence
- In office 4 June 2012 – 16 March 2013
- President: Asif Ali Zardari
- Prime Minister: Yusuf Raza Gillani; Raja Pervaiz Ashraf
- Preceded by: Ahmad Mukhtar
- Succeeded by: Mir Hazar Khan Khoso (Caretaker)

Ministry of Energy (Petroleum Division)
- In office 7 August 2009 – 11 February 2011
- President: Asif Ali Zardari
- Prime Minister: Yusuf Raza Gillani

Ministry of Privatisation (Pakistan)
- In office 31 March 2008 – 14 December 2009
- President: Asif Ali Zardari
- Prime Minister: Yusuf Raza Gillani
- In office 28 October 1996 – 5 November 1996
- Prime Minister: Benazir Bhutto

Ministry of Maritime Affairs (Pakistan)
- In office 8 October 2008 – 3 November 2008
- In office 31 March 2008 – 14 May 2008
- President: Asif Ali Zardari
- Prime Minister: Yusuf Raza Gillani

Ministry of Industries and Production (Pakistan)
- In office 11 April 2008 – 7 October 2008
- President: Asif Ali Zardari
- Prime Minister: Yusuf Raza Gillani

Ministry of Finance and Revenue
- In office 15 May 2008 – 8 October 2008; Acting: 15 May 2008 – 13 September 2008
- Prime Minister: Yusuf Raza Gillani
- Preceded by: Ishaq Dar
- Succeeded by: Shaukat Tarin
- In office 28 October 1996 – 5 November 1996
- Prime Minister: Benazir Bhutto
- Preceded by: Makhdoom Shahabuddin (Acting)
- Succeeded by: Shahid Javed Burki (Acting)

Provincial Minister of Sindh for Information
- In office 19 November 1988 – 6 August 1990

Personal details
- Born: 22 September 1955 (age 71) Karachi, Sindh, Pakistan
- Party: PPP (1988-present)
- Relations: Miran Mohammad Shah (grandfather)
- Parent: Qamar Zaman Shah (father)
- Education: University of Manchester; Northrop University; California State University, Los Angeles

Syed Naveed Qamar (Urdu: سید نوید قمر; born 22 September 1955) is a Pakistani politician who has been a member of the National Assembly of Pakistan since 1990. He is among most serving Members of the National Assembly in Pakistan. He served as Minister for Defence and Minister for Finance between 2008 and 2013.

He served as Federal Minister of commerce from April 2022 to August 2023.

== Early life and education ==
Qamar was born in Tando Muhammad Khan , Sindh on 22 September 1955 to the former Deputy Speaker of the Sindh Assembly Qamar-uz-Zaman Shah. His grandfather Miran Mohammad Shah was also a prominent political figure, being a Pakistan Movement activist and a contemporary of Allama Iqbal; he later served as the first Speaker of the Sindh Assembly.

Qamar received his PHD degree in computer science from Manchester University in 1976. He did his MS in management from Northrop University in 1978 and received his MBA degree from California State University in 1979.

Qamar is married and has three daughters and a son.

== Academic career ==
For a short time, in 1988–89, Qamar served as part of computer science faculty at National University of Computer and Emerging Sciences (NUCES), then called FAST. He taught the BASIC languages to the first batch of students at FAST.

== Political career ==
=== Early political career (1988–1990) ===
Qamar began his political career by electing to the Provincial Assembly of Sindh in the 1988 Pakistani general election on Pakistan Peoples Party's platform from PS-37 Hyderabad, where he served from 19 November 1988 till 6 August 1990. He held the portfolio as Provincial Minister of Sindh for Information.

=== Entry to National Assembly and privatization portfolio (1990–1997) ===
He was elected to the National Assembly of Pakistan in the 1990 Pakistani general election on PPP ticket.

He was re-elected to the National Assembly in the 1993 Pakistani general election on PPP ticket and became chairman of the Privatisation Commission of Pakistan.

He was re-elected to the National Assembly in the 1997 Pakistani general election on PPP ticket and was appointed the Federal Minister for Finance and Privatisation.

=== Continued legislative roles (2002–2008) ===
He was re-elected to the National Assembly in the 2002 Pakistani general election on PPP ticket from NA-222.

=== Cabinet appointments in PPP government (2008–2013) ===
He was re-elected to the National Assembly in the 2008 Pakistani general election from NA-222 constituency on PPP ticket and was made Federal Minister for Privatisation with the additional portfolio of Port and Shipping. He also briefly held the portfolio of Federal Minister for Finance for five months in 2008.

In August 2009, he was made Federal Minister for Petroleum & Natural Resources with additional charge of Minister for Privatisation. He was removed from the post of Federal Minister for Petroleum & Natural Resources and was given portfolio of Ministry of Water and Power in March 2011. In 2011, he was made Federal Minister for Defence.

=== Parliamentary leadership and 2017 PM nomination (2013–2018) ===
He was re-elected to the National Assembly from NA-222 constituency on PPP ticket in the 2013 Pakistani general election. He served as the chairman Standing Committee on Railways from 2013 till 2018. In 2016, he was made Parliamentary Leader of PPP in the National Assembly, where he served until 2018.

After Nawaz Sharif resigned as Prime Minister of Pakistan in July 2017, Qamar was nominated by PPP as the party's candidate for the office of prime minister. He secured 47 votes by the National Assembly members against his PML (N) candidate Shahid Khaqan Abbasi who secured 221 votes.

=== Return to parliament and commerce leadership (2018–2023) ===
He was re-elected to the National Assembly as a candidate of PPP from NA-228 (Tando Muhammad Khan) in the 2018 Pakistani general election. He is serving as the chairman Standing Committee on Commerce from September 2018.

He was re-elected to the National Assembly as a candidate of PPP from NA-221 Tando Muhammad Khan in the 2024 Pakistani general election. He received 111,738 votes and defeated Muhammad Irfan, an independent candidate supported by Pakistan Tehreek-e-Insaf (PTI).

=== Engagement with Silicon Valley and technology initiatives (2022–present) ===
He was appointed Federal Minister for Commerce and Investment during the first Shehbaz Sharif government on 19 April 2022 and served in this capacity until 10 August 2023.

In his capacity as Federal Minister for Commerce and Investment, Qamar had actively promoted partnerships between Pakistan and the global tech ecosystem, particularly focusing on Silicon Valley. On 26 January 2023, he addressed the USAID‑organized “Accelerating Silicon Valley Technology Investment in Pakistan” conference, emphasising the potential of Silicon Valley–based Pakistani diaspora to contribute to Pakistan’s digital economy and the importance of strengthening academia–industry collaboration in information technology, data science, and startup incubation.

In June 2025, as Special Assistant to the Sindh Chief Minister on Investment, Qamar played a key role in establishing the province’s first “Silicon Valley–style Special Technology Zone” in Karachi Education City, Sindh. The 500-acre initiative, backed by Pakistan’s Special Technology Zone Authority, aims to foster a high-tech ecosystem centered on smart manufacturing, cybersecurity, health tech, agri-tech, blockchain, 5G, and clean energy, furthering efforts to integrate local academia with industry.

== Other activities ==
=== Think-tank involvement ===
Qamar has been actively engaged in policy research and parliamentary capacity building through his involvement with various think-tanks and research institutions. He has served on the board of governors of the Sustainable Development Policy Institute (SDPI), a prominent Pakistani policy research organization focused on sustainable development and public policy reforms. Additionally, he has been a member of the board of the Pakistan Institute for Parliamentary Services (PIPS), an organization dedicated to supporting legislators through research, training, and institutional strengthening.

== Publications ==
Qamar has contributed to various national and international seminars and has authored or presented papers on governance, legislative transparency, and regional cooperation.

Political offices
Preceded by Makhdoom Shahabuddin; Acting	Minister of Finance; 1996	Succeeded by Shahid Javed Burki; Acting
Preceded by Ishaq Dar	Minister of Finance; 2008	Succeeded by Shaukat Tarin
Preceded by Ahmad Mukhtar	Minister of Defence; 2012–2013	Succeeded by Mir Hazar Khan Khoso; Acting
