= Masood Ahmed (economist) =

Pakistan-born British economist

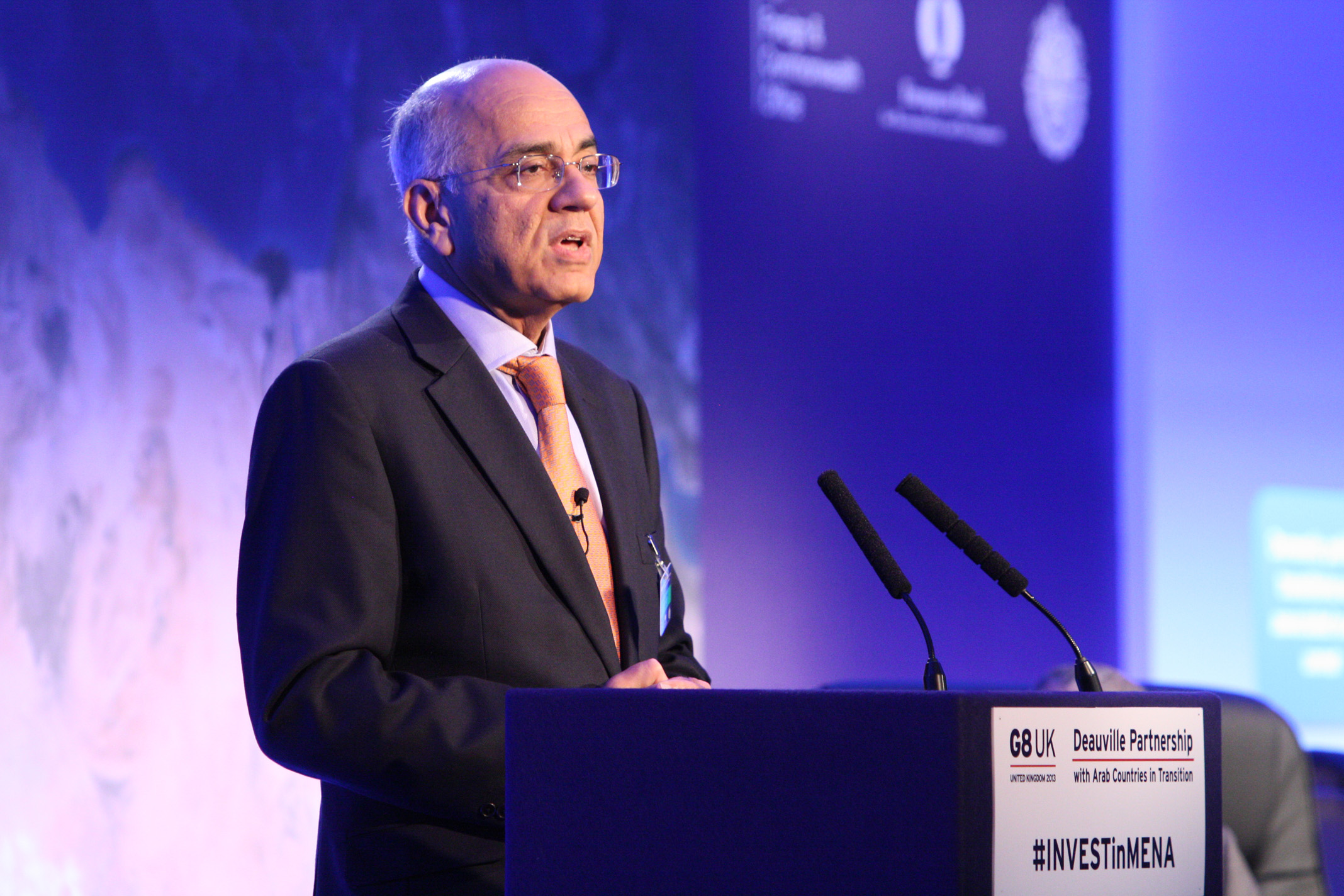

Sir Masood Ahmed KCMG is a Pakistan-born British economist. He served as president of the Center for Global Development between 2017 and 2024. He previously held positions in the International Monetary Fund (IMF), the World Bank and the UK Government's Department for International Development.

Ahmed has worked on areas that included international economic policy relating to debt, aid effectiveness, trade, and global economic prospects. He is an active writer on economics and the Middle East, including as a regular contributor to the Huffington Post.

== Early life and education ==
Ahmed was born and raised in Pakistan, where he attended the Karachi Grammar School. He obtained his graduate and post-graduate degrees in Economics from the London School of Economics, where he also served on the economics faculty.

== Career ==
Between 1979 and 2000, Ahmed held a number of positions in the World Bank. He worked for 10 years on country programs and projects in different regions and, for a further 10 years, on international economic policy relating to debt, aid effectiveness, trade and global economic prospects. As Vice President for Poverty Reduction and Economic Management, Ahmed was the senior World Bank manager responsible for the development of the Poverty Reduction Strategy Paper approach as well as the HIPC Debt Initiative. He also served concurrently for a year as Acting Vice President for Private Sector Development and Infrastructure.

Between 2000 and 2003, Ahmed was deputy director in the IMF's Policy Development and Review Department. In this role, he served as the senior staff for taking forward the IMF's policy work, in support of low income member countries and its relationship with the World Bank and other development agencies. From 2003 until 2006, Ahmed served as Director General for Policy and International Development at the UK Government's Department for International Development (DFID).

In 2006, Ahmed returned to the IMF as Director of the External Relations Department. From 2008, he served as the IMF's Director of Middle East and Central Asia Department.

Between 2017 and 2024, Ahmed served as president of the Center for Global Development (CGD), succeeding founding president Nancy Birdsall.

In early 2021, Ahmed was appointed by the G20 as project director in charge of the High Level Independent Panel (HLIP) on financing the global commons for pandemic preparedness and response, co-chaired by Ngozi Okonjo-Iweala, Tharman Shanmugaratnam and Lawrence Summers. Later that year, he was appointed to the World Bank–International Monetary Fund High-Level Advisory Group (HLAG) on Sustainable and Inclusive Recovery and Growth, co-chaired by Mari Pangestu, Ceyla Pazarbasioglu, and Nicholas Stern.

Ahmed was appointed Knight Commander of the Order of St Michael and St George (KCMG) in the 2023 New Year Honours for services to international development.
