= Chishty Mujahid =

Pakistani cricket commentator (born 1944)

Personal information
- Full name: Chishty bin Subh-o-Mujahid
- Nationality: Pakistani
- Born: 17 January 1944 (age 82) Delhi, British India
- Education: Karachi Grammar School, National College Karachi, Selwyn College, Cambridge

Director of Pakistan Cricket Board
- In office 2002–2003

Chishty bin Subh-o-Mujahid (Urdu: چشتی مجاہد, born 1944), commonly known as Chisty Mujahid, is a Pakistani cricket commentator who also played club-level cricket.

He also served as Director of Pakistan Cricket Board from 2002 to 2003.

== Early life ==
Chishty was born on 17 January 1944 in Delhi, British Raj to a father who was a government employee. His family migrated to Karachi from Allahabad after the establishment of Pakistan in 1947.

== Education and career ==
He was educated at Karachi Grammar School, then the National College Karachi, and later at Selwyn College, Cambridge. He began commentary on Pakistani radio in 1967 on television in 1970. Chishty has also commentated for international events outside the country.

== Awards ==
- Pride of Performance award by the President of Pakistan in 2004.
- In 1986, he was awarded the PTV 'Best Sports Commentator' award.
- He won the Radio Pakistan best cricket commentator award in 1999 and excellence award in 2001.
