= 2019–20 Pakistan federal budget =

2019-20 Federal Budget
- Presented: 11 June 2019
- Country: Pakistan
- Parliament: National Assembly of Pakistan
- Party: Pakistan Tehreek-e-Insaf
- Finance minister: Hammad Azhar
- Treasurer: Ministry of Finance, Revenue and Economic Affairs
- Total revenue: ▲ Rs. 6,717 trillion
- Total expenditures: ▲ Rs. 7,036 trillion
- Deficit: ▲3.8%

The Federal budget 2019–20 is the federal budget of Pakistan for the fiscal year beginning from 1 July 2019 and ending on 30 June 2020.

It was presented by Revenue Minister Hammad Azhar on 11 June 2019 at the National Assembly with a total outlay of ₨. 7.022 tn.
