= Mere Rehnuma, Mere Humnawa =

2023 book by Farid Ahmed Paracha

- Author: Farid Ahmad Paracha
- Language: Urdu
- Genre: Memoirs
- Publisher: Qalam Foundation International, Lahore
- Publication date: 2023-07-04
- Publication place: Pakistan
- Media type: Hardcover
- Pages: 390

Mere Rehnuma, Mere Humnawa (Urdu: میرے رہنما، میرے ہم نوا) is an Urdu book by the Pakistani politician Farid Ahmad Paracha. The book was published on 4 July 2023 by Qalam Foundation International, Lahore.

== Synopsis ==
The book contains personality sketches and memories of some renowned people like Tahir-ul-Qadri, Agha Shorish Kashmiri, Majeed Nizami, Khadim Hussain Rizvi, Dr. Israr Ahmed, Amin Ahsan Islahi, Qazi Hussain Ahmad, Syed Abul A'la Maududi, and several others.
