= Karachi Grammar School =

Independent Anglican school in Karachi, Pakistan

- مکتب گرامر کراچی
- Logo of Karachi Grammar School (Crest)

Location
- Karachi, Sindh; Pakistan; 24°51′53″N 67°01′42″E

Information
- School type: Independent school, Day school, Selective school
- Motto: Lucerna Meis Pedibus (A lantern to my feet)
- Religious affiliations: Anglican; Church of Pakistan (formerly Church of England)
- Founded: 1847; 179 years ago
- Founder: The Reverend Henry Brereton
- Status: Active
- Principal: Carl P.Lander
- Gender: Co-educational
- Age: 3 to 19
- Houses: Frere; Napier; Papworth; Streeton
- Publication: The Grammarian; The Pulse
- Alumni: Old Grammarians' Society
- Website: www.kgs.edu.pk

Karachi Grammar School is a private, coeducational school located in Karachi, Pakistan. It is highly selective, serving approximately 2,400 students aged between three and nineteen.

Established in 1847 by the Reverend Henry Brereton, the first chaplain of Karachi, as a school for "English and Anglo-Indo children", it is the oldest private school in Pakistan and the second oldest in South Asia, a member of the Winchester International Symposium and a former member of the Headmaster's Conference.

Since the 1980s, Karachi Grammar School has expanded from a school with a population of a few hundred students to a large institution that now occupies three sites and teaches more than two thousand students.

== History ==
=== 1847–1854: Origins ===
Karachi Grammar School was founded as the Anglo-Indian School in 1847. It remained the only non-native school in the town until St Patrick's High School, Karachi, was founded in 1861, followed by St Joseph's Convent School, Karachi, in 1862, and Manora School in 1866. Reverend Henry Brereton, the First Chaplain of Karachi, established the school and provided the early accommodation for the school at his private residence, with the first classes taking place in his kitchen. The class formed by the chaplain was at first small enough to be accommodated in these modest premises; however, the smooth running of this school over the next seven years was disturbed by rumours of Brereton not being a "good master" and his performance as a manager being unsatisfactory.

Looking into this matter, on 27 July 1854, the Commissioner of Sindh, Sir Bartle Frere, summoned a public meeting with a view to establishing an institution that provided 'good secular instruction to children of all sects'. In this meeting, funds were collected through subscriptions to establish a school, a managing committee was appointed and rules were framed that later became the basis for the present Constitution of KGS. It was the newly appointed, managing committee that decided to purchase the Mess House of Her Majesty's 64th Regiment at No. 24 Depot Lines, which is at the site of the present day Middle School. The reorganized school was formally opened on 1 November 1854 as "The Kurrachee European and Indo-European School".

=== 1854–1914: Early years ===
The school continued on its regular course with a small student body of around 40 children. In 1874, Reverend G. B. Streeton, then Chaplain of Karachi and Honorary Secretary of the school, suggested a plan that included expanding the school premises and securing a title deed for the land the school was to occupy, which could only be completed by August 1890 due to complications regarding the government's rights to the resumption of cantonment land.

Streeton raised ₨ 4,918, which enabled his plan to go ahead. Captain Thomas F. Dowden of the Royal Bombay Engineers was commissioned to make the architectural drawings for the new building. The new school building was opened for boarders on 27 February 1875 by Sir William Merewether, Commissioner-in-Sind at that time. The role of children was 75 in 1875 and 90 children in 1876 with six teachers, implying a pupil-teacher ratio of 15:1.

During the following years, the school flourished. It was endowed with a library in memory of a local doctor. In 1879, the school was renamed from "The Kurrachee European and Indo-European School" to "Karachi Grammar School".

In 1901, the school went through a difficult time after the headmaster, Mr. Taylor, was forced into resignation by the school's managing committee; the number of students decreased considerably over the course of the following year. Taylor opened his own school named "Taylor High School". In 1902, Taylor returned along with the pupils from his private school. During the next three years, the school improved academically; however, it struggled financially, barely affording the employees. In 1910 the school received a grant of Rs. 2000, which continued over the next thirty years and rescued it from financial crisis.

In 1912, Bernard Tobin was the first pupil to take and pass the Cambridge School Certificate Examination. Additionally, this year marked the first scouts enrolled in the school. Towards the end of 1914, construction began on the third story of the school, and students were temporarily taught in a building on Merewether Road, which was given free of charge. The total count of students had reached 151.

== Academics and curriculum ==
Karachi Grammar School gives its students 15 years of education on three different sites. The Kindergarten and Junior sections are accommodated in one site in Clifton, with students spending Nursery, Prep, Grades 1 and 2 in the Kindergarten Section, and Grades 3–6 in its Junior Section. Children spend three years in Grades 7–9 in the middle school located on the Saddar site. On the senior level, the college section, also located in Clifton, is geared towards preparing students for the GCE ordinary Level, advanced subsidiary level, and advanced Level examinations.

Subjects taught at KGS include physics, chemistry, mathematics, biology, computer studies, computing, Pakistan studies, Urdu, Islamiyat, English Literature, English Language, economics, accounting, business studies, world history, art, world geography, psychology, sociology, and media studies.

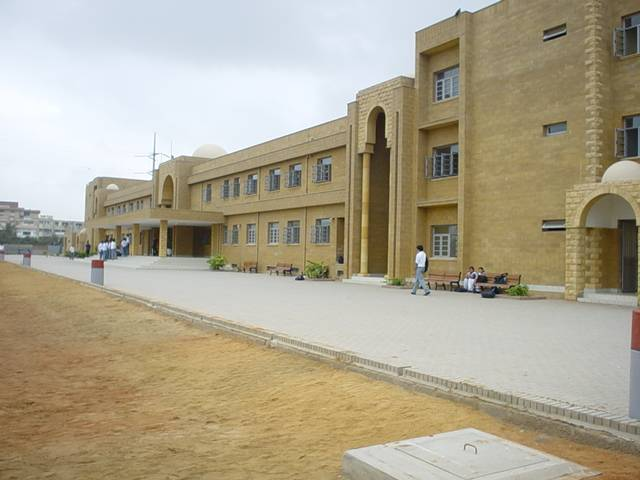
College Section, Clifton

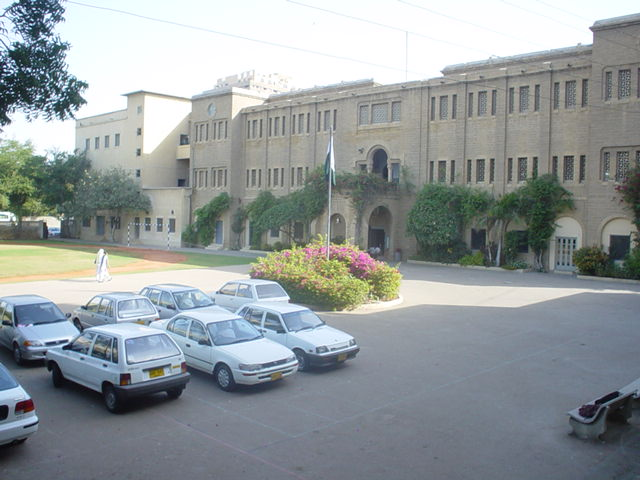
Middle Section, Saddar

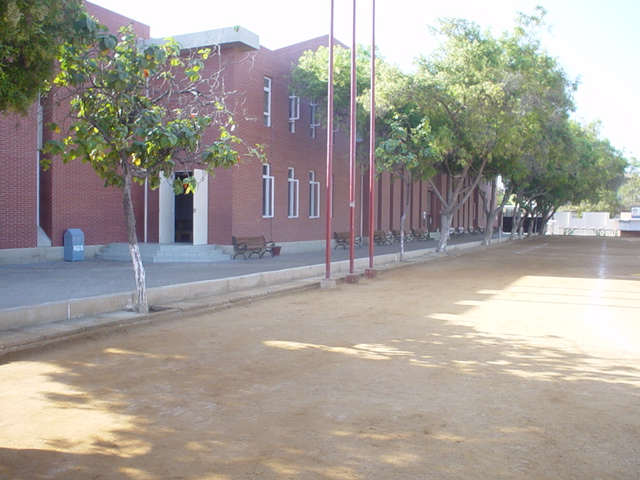
Kindergarten and Junior Section, Clifton

== Extracurricular activities ==
In the Junior Section, extracurricular activities available include sports, music, swimming, a school choir, scouts and girl guides, community service, etc. In the Middle Section, activities and events are organized through clubs and societies, such as the Biology and Philosophy clubs and the Helper's Society. At the College Section, there are several societies and clubs, such as those focused on humanities and arts, like the Eastern Music Society, Urdu Society and the Dramatica Club, as well as those focused on STEM, notably the Einstein Society and Mathematics Society, among others. Karachi Grammar School also hosts many national and inter-school competitions and events, such as Karachi Grammar Science Olympiad, Karachi Grammar Mathematics Olympiad, KGX, Karachi Grammar Entrepreneurship Summit (KGES), GRAMA, GRAMMART, and GRAMMUN.

=== Public speaking and debating ===
The school has won national and international debate competitions. It maintains a Parliamentary Debate Team, several of whom have represented Pakistan in the World Schools Debating Championships.

Karachi Grammar School is also known for its Model United Nations team. It has entered competitions including LUMUN (Pakistan's largest international Model United Nations conference, hosting over 1200 delegates), where the school team won in 2008, 2009, 2012, 2015, 2019, 2020 and most recently, in 2021. Karachi Grammar School also took part in Harvard Model United Nations 2012 in Beijing, China, winning the 'Best Large Delegation' award. In August of the same year, Karachi Grammar School sent a 12-member delegation to Hyderabad, India, to attend the 2nd session of the Harvard Model United Nations India. Once more, the delegation received the overall Best Large Delegation Award out of over 100 delegations and 800 delegates. This made the school the winner at both of Harvard's international high school MUN conferences (China and India). In the following years, KGS was once again declared the Best Large Delegation at Harvard MUN India 2013 and Harvard MUN China 2014, 2015. They won Best International Delegation at HMUN Boston 2016 as well as HMUN China 2017.

== House system ==
The school uses the houses; this was introduced in 1929.

== Leadership ==
The school is currently led by Mr. Carl P. Lander, who serves as Principal and Chief Executive Officer. The school operates under the governance of a Board of Governors registered as a Society under the Societies Registration Act of 1860. The school maintains complete financial independence, receiving no grants from the government or any other external source.

== Sports ==
In February 2024, Karachi Grammar School won the Reflections School Tournament, defeating the host school 2-1 in the final.

== Admissions ==
As of 2025, the school conducted admissions for multiple entry points including Year VII (Grade 7), Year X (Grade 10), and A-Level First Year admissions. For external candidates applying to A-Level programs, a non-refundable processing fee of Rs. 2,500 was required.

== Notable alumni ==
- Muhammad Abdur Rahman, justice of the Sindh High Court
- Masood Ahmed, economist, president of the Center for Global Development; former director of the IMF; former vice president of the World Bank
- Chaudhary Muhammad Ali, nuclear physicist; political-defence analyst
- Asif Ali Zardari, co-chair of the Pakistan People's Party; former President of Pakistan, and husband of Benazir Bhutto
- Aliza Ayaz (2017), United Nations Ambassador, climate activist,epidemiologist, financial services consultant, Cannes Film Festival sustainability director
- Benazir Bhutto (1969), former Prime Minister of Pakistan and first elected Muslim female head of state
- Murtaza Bhutto (1971), politician; writer, senior member of Pakistan Peoples Party
- Arthur Edward Cumming VC, recipient of the Victoria Cross
- Jamil Dehlavi, film director and producer
- Hareem Farooq, actress, producer
- Rayid Ghani, academic, director of the Center for Data Science and Public Policy at the University of Chicago
- Qazi Faez Isa, justice of the Pakistani Supreme Court
- Hameed Haroon, CEO Dawn Media Group
- Hussain Haroon, Permanent Representative of Pakistan to the United Nations
- Nazia Hassan, pop singer`
- Pervez Hoodbhoy, nuclear physicist; political-defence analyst
- Asim Hussain H.I., founder of Ziauddin University
- Ali Jehangir Siddiqui (1995), former Pakistani Ambassador to the United States, diplomat, businessman
- Ghulam Mustafa Jatoi, politician; acting prime minister of Pakistan
- Tapu Javeri, radio host, creative director, photographer, jewelry designer
- Rabiya Javeri Agha, federal secretary
- Dail Jones (1959), New Zealand politician; member of the New Zealand First party
- Maliha Lodhi, political scientist, diplomat, columnist, and military strategist; former High Commissioner of Pakistan to the United Kingdom; former Pakistani Ambassador to the United States; Permanent Representative of Pakistan to the United Nations, the first women to hold the position
- Sabeen Mahmud, humanitarian and social worker
- Chishty Mujahid (1962), cricket commentator
- Waheed Murad (1954), actor, producer, scriptwriter
- Arif Naqvi, founder of The Abraaj Group, philanthropist
- Kumail Nanjiani (1996), comedian, actor, Hollywood director
- Sharmeen Obaid-Chinoy (1997), documentary film maker, journalist, two time Academy Award winner, five time Emmy winner
- Nadeem F. Paracha (1983), journalist, cultural critic, satirist, historian, author
- Atta ur Rahman (1960), organic chemist; Fellow of the Royal Society of London; federal minister for Science and Technology
- Sherry Rehman, former Pakistani Ambassador to the United States, former editor of Herald Magazine, senior member of Pakistan Peoples Party
- Ameena Saiyid, publisher
- Princess Sarvath al-Hassan, princess, husband was once Crown Prince of Jordan
- Sadeq Sayeed, hedge fund manager; involved in the acquisition of residual parts of Lehman Brothers
- Nafisa Shah (1986), Member of National Assembly, Chair of the National Commission for Human Development, General Secretary of the Women's Parliamentary Caucus
- Kamila Shamsie, novelist
- Thomas W. Simons Jr., former ambassador, visiting scholar at Cornell and at Harvard's Davis Center for Russian and Eurasian Studies; escorted Duke Ellington during his tour of Pakistan
- Sabiha Sumar, filmmaker

== See also ==
- Aitchison College
- Winchester College
- The Lyceum School
