= Aliza Ayaz =

Climate activist

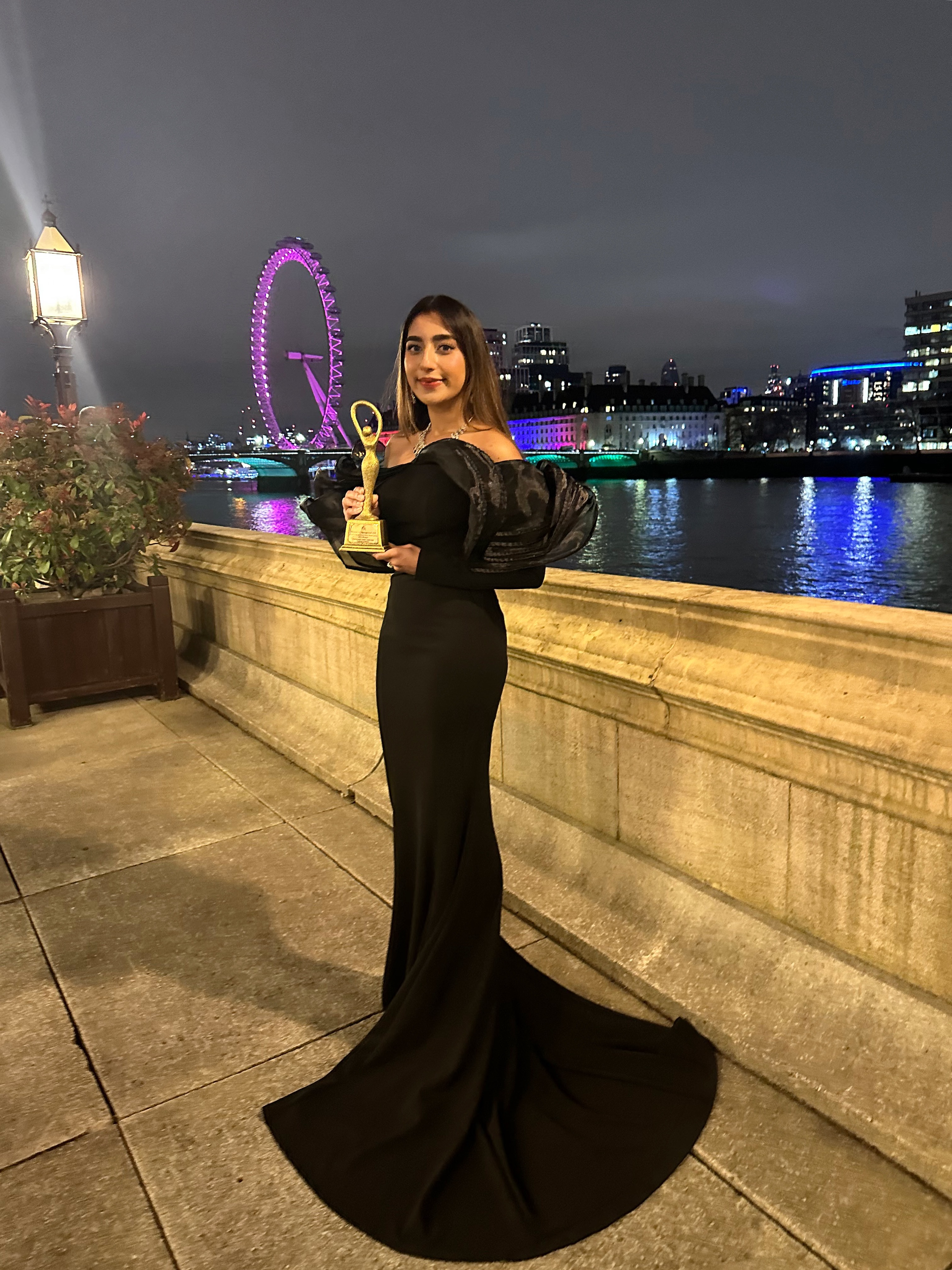
- Ayaz at the UK House of Lords, 2024
- Born: Dubai, United Arab Emirates
- Education: University College London
- Occupations: International climate activist, business consultant, sustainability diplomat
- Years active: 2017–present
- Website: www.alizaayaz.com

Aliza Ayaz is an international climate activist, business and sustainability consultant and a United Nations Goodwill Ambassador. She jointly won the United Kingdom Youth Outstanding Commitment to Sustainability Award at University College London (UCL), and has spoken at United Nations, London International Model United Nations, and UK Parliamentary events. She is a member of the National Youth Council Pakistan. She is known for setting up the Climate Action Society at University College London which helped inspire UK-wide youth action against climate change, leading to the climate emergency declaration at the UK Parliament. In October 2020 she was appointed as the United Nations youth ambassador for Sustainable Development Goal 13 (SDG13), the first Pakistani student to have received this honour.

== Early life and education ==
Ayaz was born in Dubai in the United Arab Emirates, and has lived most of her life around the Middle East. Before moving to London, she studied at Karachi Grammar School and Dubai British School.

She studied at University College London for her bachelor's degree followed by an MSc in infectious disease epidemiology.

== Career ==
While a student, Ayaz founded the Climate Action Society (CAS) at UCL in 2018. Ayaz heads a series of London-based conferences, workshops, campaigns and the annual "Sustainability Symposium" hosted at UCL to engage the UK wide youth in pushing for climate resilience.

Ayaz organised workshops to motivate positive changes in climate-related behaviours with a range of experts given her passion to tackle the climate change health impacts as an emerging cause of morbidity that became apparent during her undergraduate studies. With her team at Climate Action Society, she is known to have facilitated diversity and inclusion in the fight against climate change through organising BME-focused networking dinners and conferences; and Ayaz was invited to a governmental round-table discussion by Lola Young, Baroness Young of Hornsey. The first UK-wide "Sustainability Symposium" which won the Students' Union "Event of the Year" award was introduced by her. The Symposium's concept connects various disciplines such as engineering and art to participate in the mitigation and adaptation to the effects of climate change.

Ayaz worked on rolling out the UK Kickstart Scheme with Rishi Sunak (Chancellor of the Exchequer at HM Treasury), providing funding to employers to create job placements for 16 to 24 year olds on Universal Credit. Simultaneously, she was also involved with the UK Green Homes Grant given her passion for tackling fuel poverty and carbon emissions.

Ayaz was invited to the 76th edition of the Cannes Film Festival to design the Festival's sustainability strategy. Ayaz was the only British Pakistani and the youngest attendee at the Marché du Film and spoke on a panel about the importance of film production to be environmental conscious.

Ayaz was awarded the "Professional Leadership in Banking & Finance" award by Women In Management UK at the House of Lords in London in March 2024 for her role as the Executive Director of Climate Action Society & business consultant, thus becoming the youngest person to have won this award in history.

Aliza Ayaz has participated in more than 300 conferences internationally, often noted for being the youngest panelist and one of the few women present. Her speaking engagements include the 2023 Pioneering Climate-Resilient Communities conference by the Institute for Government & Public Policy (IGPP), where she joined policymakers and thought leaders to discuss community preparedness strategies. She was also invited to deliver a session titled Leadership Masterclass: Leading Through Climate Change hosted by Airmic, an organization focused on leadership in the risk and insurance sectors. In 2021, Ayaz was listed among participants at For Thought, a global summit of policymakers and corporate leaders addressing global challenges including climate change. In addition to national summits, she has engaged with educational audiences, such as delivering a talk at Bishop Ullathorne Catholic School aimed at motivating young leaders. Her environmental advocacy work was also the focus of her keynote at the Royal College of Psychiatrists’ Transcultural Psychiatry Special Interest Group Conference, where she discussed mental health and climate change. In 2022, Ayaz joined the Festival of Education, engaging with educators and influencers on youth-driven climate action, and spoke at the ClientEarth Summit on how young people can drive meaningful change through career choices and innovation.

== Personal life ==
Ayaz resides between Kingdom of Saudi Arabia and London, England with friends and family, but is often travelling. She credits her parents Mohammad Ayaz and Dr. Rana Najmi for her success and inspiration.

== Other work and media involvement ==
Ayaz is involved with global health policy initiatives at UCL's department under the Vice-Provost (Health) David Lomas. She is currently enrolled on an undergraduate program for Population Health Sciences at UCL.

She has written about universities' carbon-neutrality policies.

Ayaz has been covered in CNN, BBC, Geo TV, ARY News, The Express Tribune, The Pakistan Daily, Parlho Pink, The Women Journal, The News International, Daily Pakistan, LexGaze Weekly, and in other media on subjects including sustainable fashion, environmental consultancy and student entrepreneurship.

She was ranked number three on The Pakistan Daily's 30 under 30 list in 2021. Ayaz regularly participates at global climate forums on behalf of the UK Government and previously spoke at the 2021 United Nations Climate Change Conference (COP26).

Ayaz is often interviewed on lifestyle related climate topics, and has spoken extensively on how Gen-Z cope with climate anxiety. Ayaz is a frequent speaker in the corporate sector, invited by organisations to assist them with their sustainability goals. She has delivered keynotes at significant conferences such as the ESG and Climate Summit 2023.

Ayaz has been involved in the Ayaz Rana Foundation, a charity launched in 2022 to provide assistance to the impoverished and the deprived.

Aliza has been invited to speak at The Economist Sustainability Week in 2024 as the only youth sustainability leader. She regularly mentors students, such as through the University of Leeds careers events and participates in regional events, such as International Women’s Day celebrations.

Ayaz participated in the Green Futures Showcase on behalf of UK Government and Bradford City Council, engaging with young students to highlight green careers and sustainability's importance in various industries.

Recognised as an industry Diversity & Inclusion leader, Ayaz has been invited to speak at notable conferences including the Sustainability LIVE 2024 summit, where she spoke about the intersection of social impact within corporate strategies.

== Research papers ==
- Najmi, Rana; Ayaz, Aliza (1 January 2021). "An Investigation of the Relationships between Ethnicity and Occupational Classes with Mental Wellbeing in the UK: Cross-Sectional Findings from the Health Survey for England 2014-16". Journal of MAR Pulmonology. 2 (1).
