= Qamar-uz-Zaman Shah =

Pakistani politician

Syed Qamar-uz-Zaman Shah MPA

Member of the Provincial Assembly of Sindh
- In office 1977–1977

Personal details
- Party: Pakistan Peoples Party
- Children: 5 including Naveed Qamar

Syed Qamar-uz-Zaman Shah (1933 – 2016) was a Pakistani politician and agriculturist who served as the Deputy Speaker of the Provincial Assembly of Sindh.

He was the father of the former federal minister Naveed Qamar.

== Political career ==
He was elected to the Senate of Pakistan in 1973 as a candidate of Pakistan Peoples Party (PPP). He remained member between 1973 and 1977.

He was elected to the Provincial Assembly of the Sindh as a candidate of PPP from Tando Muhammad Khan in the 1977 Pakistani general election. Subsequently, he was elected as the Deputy Speaker of the Sindh Assembly which he served for three months.

He was jailed twice during Zia's regime in 1977 and 1981.
