= Sadeq Sayeed =

- Born: 1953 (age 72–73)
- Education: Bachelor of Science (Electrical Engineering & Computer Science); Master of Finance
- Alma mater: Karachi Grammar School; Massachusetts Institute of Technology (Department of Electrical Engineering and Computer Science) (Sloan School of Management)
- Occupation: Banker
- Years active: 1980–present
- Employer: Metage Capital Limited
- Known for: Chief negotiator in Nomura's acquisition of Lehman Brothers's EMEA assets
- Title: Chairman
- Board member of: Metage Capital Ltd; JS Investments Ltd; Silk Bank Limited

Sadeq Sayeed (born 1953) is a Pakistani-born British banker and businessman. He is known for his role behind Nomura's acquisition of the Europe, the Middle East and Africa (EMEA) businesses of Lehman Brothers in Oct 2008.

From Nov 2008 till Feb 2009, he was CEO of acquired EMEA businesses of Lehman; and later as CEO of Nomura International plc, a wholly owned subsidiary of Nomura Europe Holdings plc until his retirement in June 2010.

He was the chairman of a London-based hedge fund firm, Metage Capital Limited until March 2019. He has also sat on the board of JS Investments Ltd, and Silk Bank Ltd.

== Early life and education ==
Sadeq Sayeed was born in Karachi in 1953. He attended Karachi Grammar School. Later, he enrolled for an undergraduate program in economics with concentration in electrical engineering from Massachusetts Institute of Technology (MIT). After earning his BS degree, he went on to complete his master's degree in finance from the MIT Sloan School of Management.

== Career ==
=== Early years : 1976 to 2000 ===
Sayeed started his active professional life in 1976 as a research associate, and subsequently an internal consultant at the World Bank, where he worked for five years.

In 1985, he joined the London office of Credit Swiss First Boston (CSFB) as an associate within the cross markets arbitrage group. From 1989 to 1999, he was a managing director, firstly within the arbitrage group and fixed income divisions; and latterly within the leverage funds group.

In 1993, he taught investment banking at MIT.

=== Nomura : 2000 to 2010 ===
He joined Nomura Group in 2000, as member of the firm's Management Committee.

On 31 March 2008, a consortium – International Finance Corporation (IFC), BankMuscat, Nomura Holdings, and Sinthos Capital; led by senior banker Shaukat Tarin along with Sadeq Sayeed was instrumental in the acquisition of a controlling stake (86.55%) in Saudi Pak Commercial Bank (SPCB), later rebranded as Silk Bank Limited.

He rose to prominence during Nomura Holdings's acquisition of the Europe, the Middle East and Africa (EMEA) assets of Lehman Brothers in Oct 2008. Sayeed was the chief negotiator for Nomura during its acquisition of the Lehman's EMEA operations.

From November 2008 till Feb 2009, he was the executive vice-chairman and Chief Executive of acquired businesses; overseeing the combined EMEA operations of Nomura and Lehman Brothers. On 2 February 2009, he was appointed as CEO of Nomura International plc, a wholly owned subsidiary of Nomura Europe Holdings plc. He held the position until his retirement on 25 June 2010. He is reported to have received $34m severance package upon his retirement.

=== After Nomura : 2010 till date ===
He is the chairman of a London-based hedge fund firm – Metage Capital Limited.

He sits on the board of JS Investments Ltd, and Silk Bank Limited.

In 2021, Sadeq was convicted for a playing in Banca Monte dei Paschi di Siena accounts scandal. On 6 May 2022, Sadeq was fully acquitted by the Court of Appeal in Milan of charges that had been brought against him and Nomura, relating to a transaction between Nomura and Banca Monte dei Paschi di Siena SpA executed in 2009.
