= Obesity in Pakistan =

Health issue in Pakistan

Obesity in Pakistan is a health issue that has effected concern only in the past few years. Urbanisation, fast food, changing lifestyles and the fact that traditional Pakistani Cuisine tends to be high in fat and sugar are among the root causes contributing to obesity in the country. Pakistan is ranked 165 (out of 194 countries) in terms of its overweight population, with 22.2% of individuals over the age of 15 crossing the threshold of obesity. This ratio roughly corresponds with other studies, which state one-in-four Pakistani adults as being overweight. In Pakistan, the problem of excess weight is quite high among adults.

People living in large cities in Pakistan are more exposed to the risks of obesity as compared to those in the rural countryside. As in larger cities, consumption of unhealthy diet like fast food and soft drink is common. Beside this, World Health Organization also shows that women have higher rates of obesity as compared to men. Pakistan also has the highest percentage of people with diabetes in South Asia.

Fat is more dangerous for South Asians than for Caucasians because the fat tends to cling to organs like the liver instead of the skin.

A total of 40% of children in Pakistan are overweight or obese, mainly due to sedentary lifestyle, excessive screen time and unhealthy diet.

== See also ==
- Health in Pakistan
- Epidemiology of obesity
- Smoking in Pakistan
