= Special Technology Zones Authority =

Body regulating technology in Pakistan

- Abbreviation: STZA
- Formation: December 2020; 5 years ago
- Type: Governmental organization
- Legal status: Active
- Headquarters: Islamabad, Pakistan
- Region served: Pakistan
- Chairman: Azfar Mansoor
- Parent organization: Cabinet Division
- Website: www.stza.gov.pk

The Special Technology Zones Authority (STZA) is a regulatory body established by the Government of Pakistan to promote and regulate the establishment and operation of Special Technology Zones (STZs) in the country. The authority is responsible for creating an enabling environment for the technology sector to thrive and attract local and foreign investments, fostering innovation, and driving economic growth.

== Background ==
The Special Technology Zones Authority (STZA) Act 2021 was passed in Pakistan in order to solve the shortcomings of current models and offer technology industry-specific incentives. This law made the STZA the STZ ecosystem's architect, facilitator, and regulator.

== Established and Planned STZs ==
The 140-acre Islamabad Technopolis, located in Chak Shehzad, is the first Special Technology Zone (STZ) to be established. It will act as a hub for technological firms, high-technology manufacturing facilities, R&D facilities, educational institutions, training facilities, offices of organizations that support science and technology, and other support services. Plans have been prepared for Zone Enterprise (ZE) tenants in a prime location in Islamabad while infrastructural development for the Islamabad Technopolis is in progress.

The Pakistan Digital City in Haripur, the Lahore Technopolis in Lahore, and the Pak-Austria Fachhochschule Institute of Applied Sciences and Technology (PAF-IAST) in Haripur are the other STZs that have been declared.
