= Ahmad Mukhtar =

Pakistani politician (1946–2020)

Chaudhry Ahmad Mukhtar
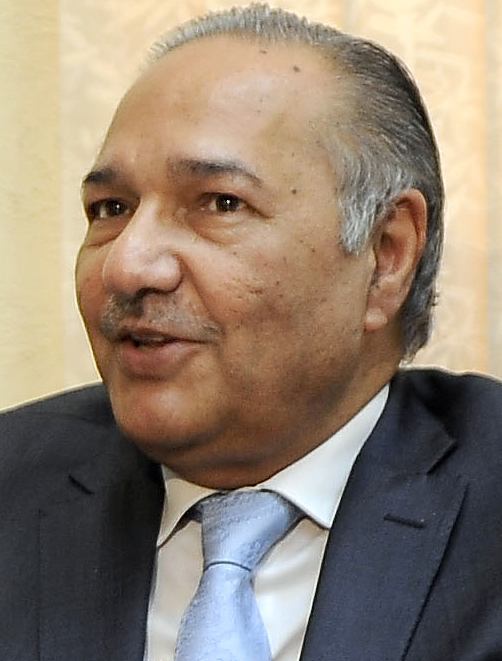

Minister for Water and Power
- In office 4 June 2012 – 16 March 2013
- President: Asif Ali Zardari
- Prime Minister: Yousaf Raza Gillani
- Preceded by: Naveed Qamar
- Constituency: NA-105(Gujrat-II)

Defence Minister of Pakistan
- In office 31 March 2008 – 3 June 2012
- President: Asif Ali Zardari
- Prime Minister: Yousaf Raza Gillani
- Preceded by: Rao Sikandar Iqbal
- Succeeded by: Naveed Qamar

Personal details
- Born: 22 June 1946 Lahore, Punjab, British India
- Died: 25 November 2020 (aged 74) Lahore, Punjab, Pakistan
- Party: Pakistan Peoples Party
- Relations: Muhammad Hussain (father); Ahmad Saeed (brother); Ijaz Butt (brother-in-law)
- Children: 3
- Education: Forman Christian College

Chaudhry Ahmad Mukhtar (Urdu: احمد مختار; 22 June 1946 – 25 November 2020) was a Pakistani politician and businessman who served as the Defence Minister of Pakistan in the Prime Minister Yousaf Raza Gillani-led cabinet. He also owned Servis Group and founded Shalamar Hospital.

He was a central leader of the Pakistan Peoples Party from Gujrat District and defeated Chaudhry Shujaat Hussain from Gujrat NA-105 in 1993 and 2008, the leader of PML-Q party, who was allied with President Pervez Musharraf, in the 2008 elections.

== Early life and education ==
Mukhtar was born 22 June 1946 in Lahore to Chaudhry Muhammad Hussain, who served as the Chairman of the Pakistan Cricket Board (PCB) in 1977-1978, into a Punjabi speaking Kashmiri family whose ancestors later settled in Gujrat. Mukhtar did his Master of Science degree in Operational Management from California, United States and a Diploma in Plastic Technology from West Germany. Mukhtar was also a graduate of Forman Christian College University. Mukhtar was fluent in Urdu, Punjabi, English and German.

== Political career ==
He was a businessman who started his political career in 1990 on PPP platform.

He was an industrialist and served as Commerce Minister in the 1993–1996 Benazir Bhutto government. He was considered the most likely candidate to be the next Prime Minister of Pakistan, along with Ameen Faheem, Yousaf Raza Gillani and Shah Mehmood Qureshi, but was later denied, when Yousaf Raza Gillani was announced as the new PM on 22 March 2008. He became the Defence Minister in the coalition government of PPP, PML-N, ANP and JUI-F formed after 2008 elections on 31 March 2008.

== Personal life ==
His brother Ahmad Saeed served as PIA Managing director (from April 2001) and PIA chairman (from April 2003, both until April 2005) during the General Pervez Musharraf era. Ahmad Mukhtar himself took the role of chairman PIA from May 2008.

He was also the brother-in-law of former Pakistan Cricket Board (PCB) chairman, Ijaz Butt.

== Death ==
Ahmad Mukhtar died after prolonged illness on 25 November 2020, aged 74.

Political offices
| Preceded by Salim Abbas Jilani (caretaker) | Defence Minister of Pakistan; 2008 – 4 July 2012 | Succeeded by Naveed Qamar |
