= Babar Khan Ghauri =

Pakistani politician

Senator Babar Khan Ghauri
- بابر خان غوری
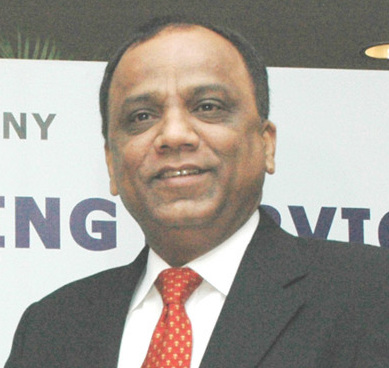
- Babar Khan Ghauri

Minister of Ports and Shipping Pakistan
- In office 2005–2007
- President: Pervez Musharraf
- Prime Minister: Shaukat Aziz
- In office 2009–2012
- President: Asif Ali Zardari
- Prime Minister: Yousaf Raza Gillani

Member of Senate of Pakistan
- In office March 2009 – March 2015

Personal details
- Born: 6 September 1961 (age 64) Karachi, Sindh, Pakistan
- Occupation: Politician
- Cabinet: Shaukat Aziz; Gillani ministry

Babar Khan Ghauri (Urdu: بابر خان غوری) (born 16 September 1961) is a Pakistani politician from Karachi, Sindh, Pakistan. He also served as Minister for Ports and Shipping Pakistan in former Prime Ministers of Pakistan Yousaf Raza Gillani and Shaukat Aziz's tenure. He also served as member of Senate of Pakistan till 2015. As main source of income, he runs a Real Estate Business in Karachi and Dubai. He is a former senior political leader of Muttahida Qaumi Movement (MQM).
