= PP-167 Lahore-XXIII =

Constituency of Punjab, Pakistan

- Constituency for the Provincial Assembly of Punjab
- Region: Lahore City in Lahore District

Current constituency
- Created from: PP-151 Lahore-XV (2002-2018); PP-166 Lahore-XXIII (2018-2023)

PP-167 Lahore-XXIII (پی پی-167، لاہور-23) is a Constituency of Provincial Assembly of Punjab.

== General elections 2024 ==
Provincial election 2024: PP-167 Lahore-XXIII
Party	Candidate	Votes	%	±%
PML(N)	Irfan Shafi Khokhar	23,248	40.68	
Independent	Ammar Bashir (Note: Filed nomination papers as PTI candidate but ECP allowed him to run as an Independent)	21,182	37.07	
TLP	Shahadat Ali	5,018	8.78	
JI	Ch. Abdul Qayyum	2,227	3.90	
Others	Others (thirty five candidates)	5,472	9.57	
Turnout		58,304	42.57	
Total valid votes		57,147	98.02	
Rejected ballots		1,157	1.98	
Majority		2,066	3.61	
Registered electors		136,963		
hold				

== General elections 2018 ==
Provincial election 2018: PP-166 Lahore-XXIII
Party	Candidate	Votes	%	±%
PML(N)	Ramzan Siddique	42,070	44.59	
PTI	Abdul Karim Rahi Kalwar	34,012	36.05	
TLP	Muhammad Kashif Ali	8,432	8.94	
PPP	Mian Tariq Aziz	2,477	2.63	
Independent	Syed Imran Aleem Shah	2,277	2.41	
Independent	Ghulam Murtaza	2,029	2.15	
MMA	Khalid Ishaq	1,306	1.38	
Others	Others (fifteen candidates)	1,757	1.85	
Turnout		95,722	50.82	
Total valid votes		94,360	98.58	
Rejected ballots		1,362	1.42	
Majority		8,058	8.54	
Registered electors		188,351		

== General elections 2013 ==
Provincial election 2013: PP-151 Lahore-XV
Party	Candidate	Votes	%	±%
PTI	Mian Mehmood Ur Rasheed	58,183	49.08	
PML(N)	Syed Tauseef Hussain Shah	54,374	45.87	
JI	Ch. Mehmood Ul Ahad	1,890	1.59	
MWM	Asad Abbas Shah	1,528	1.29	
PPP	Faheem Jameel Thakar	1,224	1.03	
Others	Others (twenty seven candidates)	1,337	1.13	
Turnout		119,465	54.67	
Total valid votes		118,536	99.22	
Rejected ballots		929	0.78	
Majority		3,809	3.21	
Registered electors		218,510		

== General elections 2008 ==
Contesting candidates	Party affiliation	Votes polled

== See also ==
- PP-166 Lahore-XXII
- PP-168 Lahore-XXIV
