= Ministry of Finance and Revenue =

Burmese government ministry

- ဘဏ္ဍာရေးနှင့် အခွန်ဝန်ကြီးဌာန

Agency overview
- Formed: 31 July 2025
- Jurisdiction: Government of Myanmar
- Agency executive: Kan Zaw, Union Minister
- Parent department: Union Government of Myanmar

Ministry of Finance and Revenue (Burmese: ဘဏ္ဍာရေးနှင့် အခွန်ဝန်ကြီးဌာန) is a Myanmar government ministry, formed after the National Defence and Security Council on 31 July 2025.

The Ministry of Finance and Revenue has emerged three times in Myanmar's administrative history. The first time was from 1948 to 1972, the second time from 1993 to 2013, and the third time from 2025 to the present.

The current Union Minister is Dr Kan Zaw.
