= Farid Ahmad Paracha =

Pakistani politician

Dr. Farid Ahmad Paracha
- ڈاکٹر فرید احمد پراچہ

Deputy Emir of Jamaat-e-Islami
- Incumbent
- Assumed office April 2019

Member of the National Assembly of Pakistan
- In office 2002–2007

Member of the Provincial Assembly of the Punjab
- In office 1990–1993

Personal details
- Born: 10 November 1949 (age 76) Sargodha, Punjab, Pakistan
- Party: Jamaat-e-Islami
- Education: University of the Punjab
- Occupation: Politician writer

Farid Ahmad Paracha (ڈاکٹر فرید احمد پراچہ) (born 10 November 1949) is a Pakistani Politician, businessman and a naib ameer (vice-president) of Jamaat-e-Islami. He also served as member of the 12th National Assembly of Pakistan from 2002 to 2007 and Member of the Provincial Assembly of the Punjab from 1990 to 1993.

== Early life and education ==
Paracha was born on 10 November 1949, in Bhera, Sargodha. He earned his LL.B degree in 1975, M.A. in 1976 and Ph.D. degree from University of the Punjab in 2005.

== Books ==
- Yeh Faslay Yeh Rabtay, Sang-e-Meel Publications, 1999.
- Umar e-Rawan, Qalam Foundation, 2021.
- Mere Rehnuma, Mere Humnawa, Qalam Foundation, 2023.
- Safar-e-Shouq, Sang-e-Meel Publications, 2025. Hajj travelogue.
