= Service Industries Limited =

Pakistani shoes and tire manufacturer

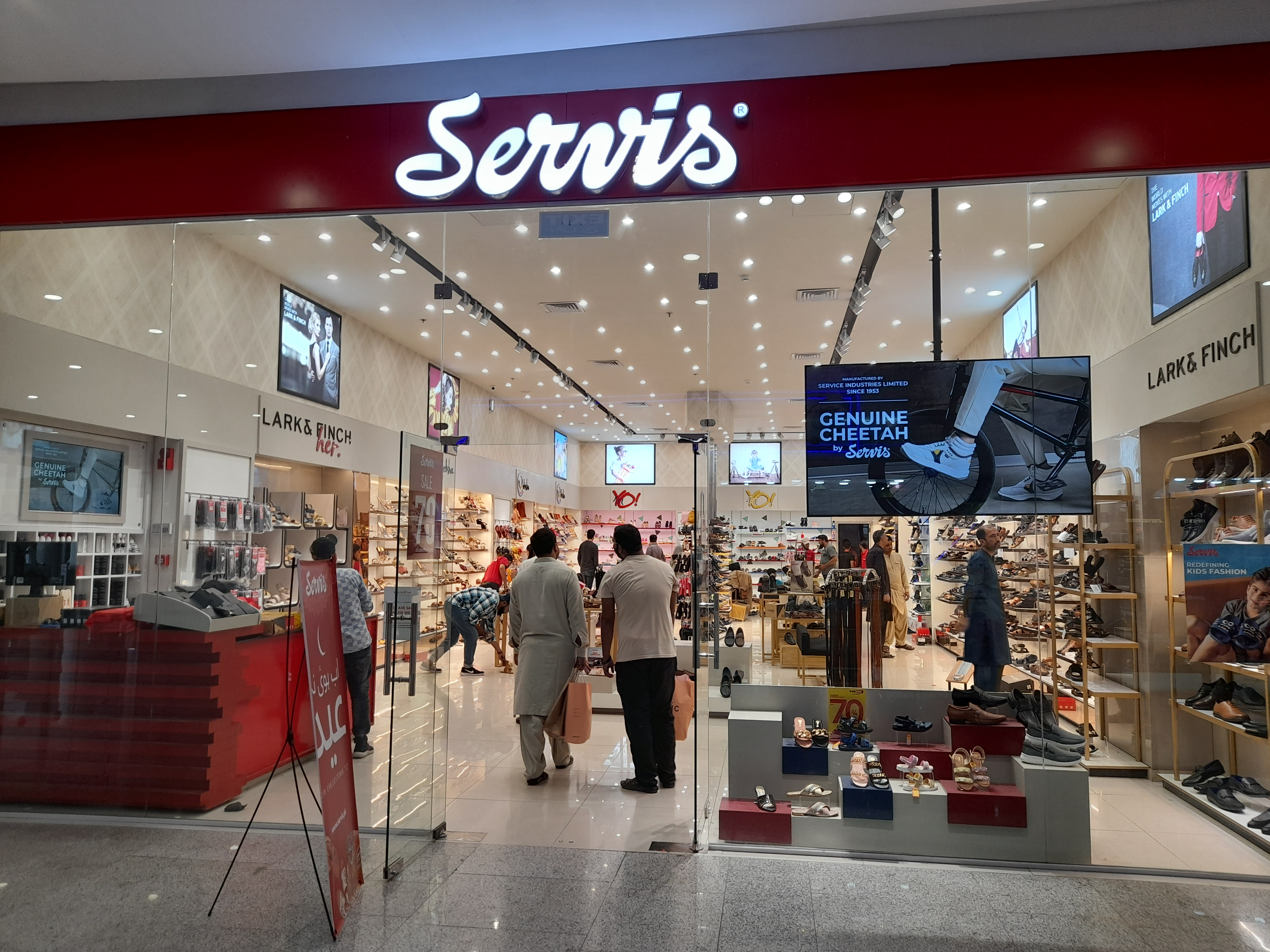
- Servis outlet at Lucky One Mall
- Trade name: Service Industries Limited
- Type: Public
- Traded as: PSX: SRVI; KSE 100 component
- Industry: Leather
- Founded: 1941; 85 years ago
- Founders: Chaudhry Nazar Mohammad; Chaudhry Muhammad Hussain; Chaudhry Mohammad Saeed
- Headquarters: Gulberg, Lahore, Pakistan
- Area served: Worldwide
- Key people: Chaudhry Ahmed Javed (chairman); Chaudhry Omar Saeed (CEO)
- Products: Shoes, tyres, and tubes
- Net income: ▲ Rs. 4.136 billion (US$15 million) (2024)
- Total equity: ▲ Rs. 14.764 billion (US$53 million) (2024)
- Owner: Hassan Javed (19.29%); National Investment Trust (10.94%); Omar Saeed (10.14%); Arif Saeed (10.14%)
- Number of employees: 1,905 (2024)
- Subsidiaries: Service Tyres; Service Retail; Service Industries Capital; SIL Gulf FZE; Dongguan Service Global; Service Global Footwear (79.43%); Service Long March Tyres (32.09%)
- Website: servisgroup.com
- Footnotes; Financials as of 31 December 2024

Service Industries Limited, doing business as Servis, is a Pakistani footwear and tire manufacturer which is based in Lahore, Pakistan.

Service factories are located in the Pakistani cities of Gujrat, Muridke, Nooriabad, Raiwind, Negombo, Sri Lanka. The company had humble beginnings in 1941. Servis Shoes is a shoe manufacturing company and Servis Tyres is a tire manufacturing company working under the Servis Industries Limited.

== History ==
Service Industries Limited (SIL) was founded in 1941 by a group of college friends, namely Chaudhry Nazar Mohammad, Chaudhry Muhammad Hussain, and Chaudhry Mohammad Saeed. It initially produced handbags and sports goods. During World War II, Service supplied boots to the British Indian Army. In 1953, the company established Halal Tanneries, and in 1954, it opened a shoe manufacturing plant in Gulberg industrial area of Lahore.

In 1959, Service relocated its operations to Gujrat, where it opened Pakistan's first organized shoe factory.

From the 1960s to the 1980s, Service diversified its product portfolio to include textiles, motorcycle tires, and gas masks. In 1965, the company formed a retail subsidiary called Service Sales Company (SSC), which opened stores near those of its competitor, Bata Pakistan. By 2007, SSC had surpassed Bata in sales, and by 2010, SIL had become a major shoe exporter and had over 450 retail outlets in Pakistan.

In 2011, Service's ownership was passed to the founders' descendants, with Omar Saeed, a third-generation family member, becoming the CEO. Under Saeed's leadership, SIL introduced changes in its retail operations, such as adopting a new store format under the Shoe Planet brand, which contributed to business growth. During this period, SSC also made changes in its managerial practices and product offerings.

== Subsidiaries ==
- Service Retail
- Servis Tyres
- Service Industries Capital
- SIL Gulf FZE
- Dongguan Service Global
- Service Global Footwear (79.43%)
- Service Long March Tyres (32.09%)

== Footwear brands ==
- Servis
- Cheetah, sport shoes
- Don Carlos, men's formal footwear
- Shoe Planet, high fashion brand shoes
- Liza, shoes for women
- Lark and Finch shoes
- Calza, shoes for men
- T.Z, shoes for kids
- Klara Shoes
- Ndure

== See also ==
- Servis Industries cricket team
