= Abdul Hafeez Shaikh =

Pakistani economist and politician

- عبدالحفیظ شیخ
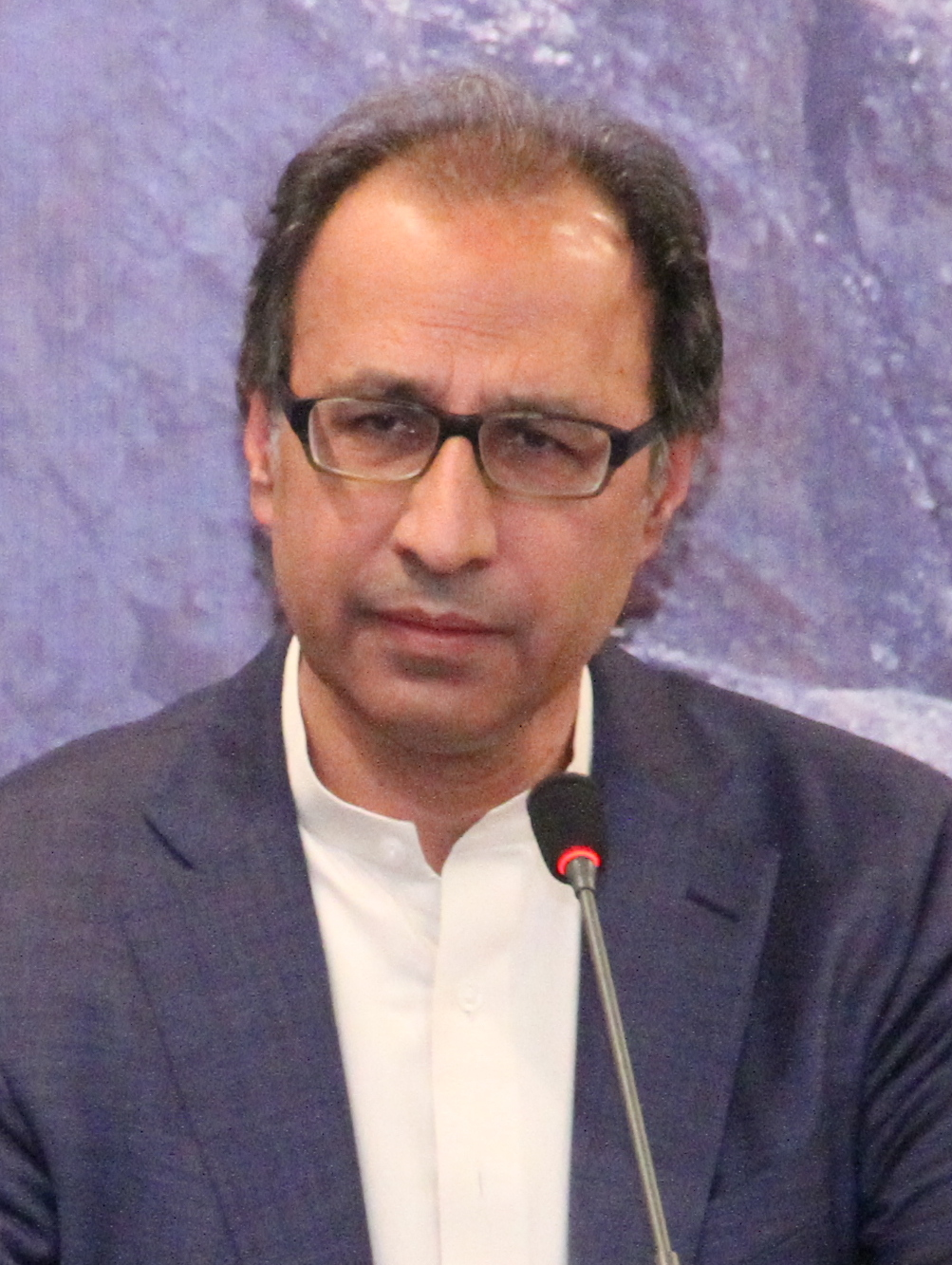

Minister of Finance and Revenue
- In office 11 December 2020 – 29 March 2021
- Prime Minister: Imran Khan
- Preceded by: Imran Khan
- Succeeded by: Hammad Azhar
- In office 18 March 2010 – 19 February 2013
- Prime Minister: Yusuf Raza Gillani; Raja Pervaiz Ashraf
- Preceded by: Shaukat Tarin
- Succeeded by: Saleem Mandviwalla

Advisor to the Prime Minister for Finance and Revenue
- In office 18 April 2019 – 11 December 2020
- Prime Minister: Imran Khan
- Deputy: Hammad Azhar (State Minister for Revenue) till 08 July 2019
- Preceded by: Asad Umar (Federal Minister for Finance, Revenue and Economic Affairs)
- Succeeded by: (himself) as Minister of Finance and Revenue

Personal details
- Born: Abdul Hafeez Shaikh Jacobabad, Sindh Province, Pakistan
- Education: Boston University
- Profession: Economist
- Academic field: Development Economics

Abdul Hafeez Shaikh (Urdu: عبدالحفیظ شیخ) is a Pakistani economist with international experience in policy making and economic management. He has twice served as the Minister of Finance (in 2010-2013 and 2019-2021). He has also at various times held the portfolios of Minister of Economic Affairs, Revenue, Planning and Development, Statistics, Privatization and Investment.

His work experience includes Harvard University, The World Bank, and Private Equity. He was thrice elected to the Senate of Pakistan.

Under his leadership, Pakistan completed its successful privatization program (2003-2006), covering telecommunications, electricity, banking, oil refining, manufacturing and other sectors for over 5 billion USD.

Shaikh was also Minister for Finance and Development in the Sindh province of Pakistan (2000- 2003), reforming the finances of the province and led the province to become one of the first sub-national governments to develop a program with the World Bank.

== Early life and education ==
Shaikh was born in Jacobabad, Sindh. He holds a PhD in Economics from Boston University.

== Academic career ==
Shaikh has many publications, including a book on Argentina's privatisation program.

== Political career ==
Shaikh is primarily an economist and a technocrat, however he has held high offices in the management of the economy which are of a political nature.

In 2000, he was appointed the Provincial Minister of Sindh for Finance and Planning in the military government.

He was elected to the Senate of Pakistan as a candidate of Pakistan Muslim League (Q) from Sindh in March 2003. He was a member of the Senate between 2003 and 2006.

Shaikh was next elected to the Senate of Pakistan as a candidate of Pakistan Peoples Party (PPP) from Sindh in March 2010. In March 2010, he was made the Minister of Finance, Revenue, Economic Affairs, Statistics and Planning and Development.

He was again elected to the Senate of Pakistan as a candidate of PPP from Sindh in 2012. In February 2013, he resigned as the Finance Minister of Pakistan as he was a candidate for Interim Prime Minister.

In April 2019, he was appointed an Advisor to the Prime Minister of Pakistan for Finance by Prime Minister Imran Khan and on December 11, 2020, he was appointed Federal Minister of Finance and Revenue.

== Other activities ==
- Islamic Development Bank, Ex-Officio Member of the Board of Governors (since 2019)
- World Bank, Ex-Officio Member of the Board of Governors (since 2019)
