= Elections in Islamabad =

Elections in Islamabad are conducted by the Election Commission of Pakistan. Islamabad is the only Federal Territory of Pakistan which is not part of any Province. Islamabad is administered by the Metropolitan Corporation of Islamabad. Islamabad is Represented by 3 MNA's in National Assembly and 4 Senators which include one technocrat/Ulema and one Woman.

== Political parties ==
Pakistan Tehreek-e-Insaf (PTI), Pakistan Muslim League Nawaz (PML-N) are the main political parties in Islamabad. Jamat-e-Islami (JI) and Pakistan People's Party (PPP) also have minor support in the Territory.

== General elections ==
PTI PML-N PPP MMA Non-Partisan

From 1977 to 1997 Islamabad was represented in the National Assembly of Pakistan by one Constituency NA-35 Islamabad. From 2002 to 2013 Islamabad had 2 National Assembly constituencies NA-48 Islamabad-I and NA-49 Islamabad-II. From 2018 onward Islamabad is represented by 3 National Assembly Constituencies NA-52 Islamabad-I, NA-53 Islamabad-II, NA-54 Islamabad-III. The below table shows the winners of each constituency:

General Election	Winners
General Election	NA-35
1977	PPP
1985	Independent
1988	PPP
1990	PML-N
1993	PML-N
1997	PML-N

General Election	Winners	
General Election	NA-48	NA-49
2002	MMA	PPP
2008	PML-N	PML-N
2013	PTI	PML-N

General Election	Winners		
General Election	NA-52	NA-53	NA-54
2018	PTI	PTI	PTI
Next			

=== Election maps (1977–2018) ===
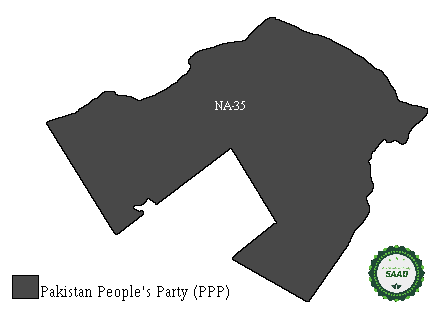
1977: PPP wins Islamabad.

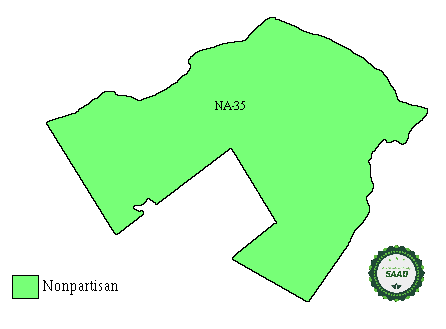
1985: Non Partisan elections held.

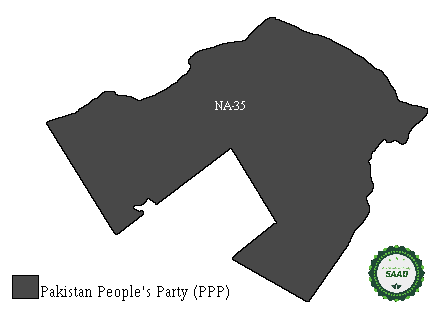
1988: PPP wins Islamabad.

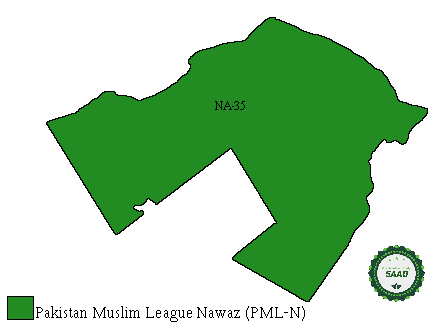
1990: PML-N wins Islamabad.

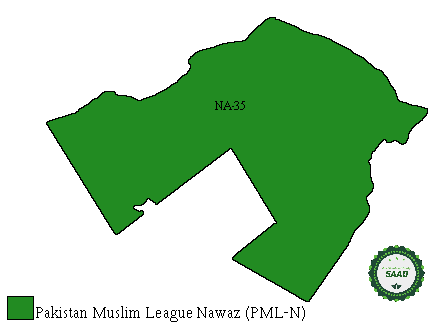
1993: PML-N wins Islamabad for 2nd consecutive time.

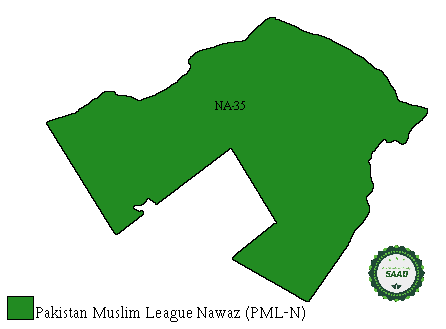
1997: PML-N wins Islamabad for 3rd consecutive time.

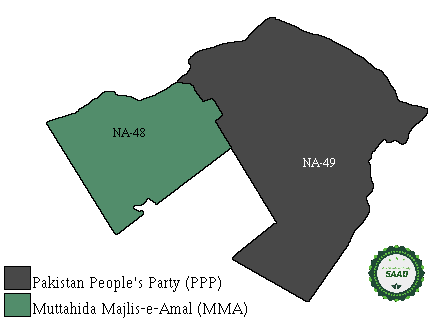
2002: PPP and MMA win one seat each.

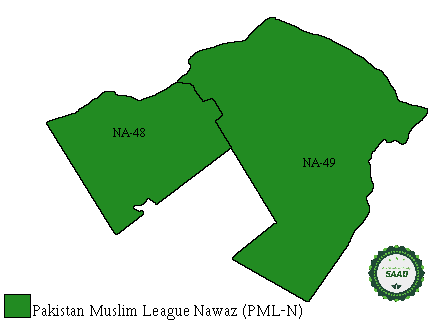
2008: PML-N swept Islamabad winning both seats.

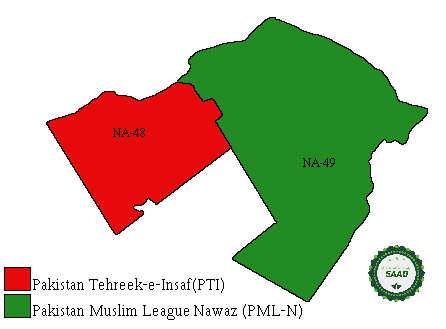
2013: PML-N and PTI won one seat each.

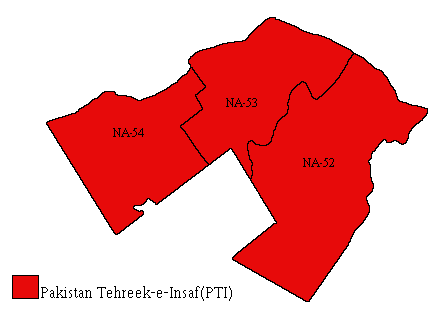
2018: PTI swept Islamabad winning all three seats by a huge margin.

== Local elections ==
Local elections are conducted in Islamabad to elect the Metropolitan Corporation of Islamabad. Islamabad is divided into 50 Union Councils . Each Union Council sends one chairman and Vice Chairman to the Metropolitan Corporation. 9 Women, 2 Minority Members, 2 Workers/Peasants, 2 Youth and 1 Technocrat are indirectly elected by the Metropolitan Corporation. The chairman and Vice Chairman of the Majority party become the Mayor and Deputy Mayor of Islamabad Respectively. Each Union Council is divided into 6 wards and each Union Council elects 6 Councilors, 2 Women Councilors, one Minority and one Youth Councilor.
