= 2018 Pakistani general election in Islamabad =

← 2013	25 July 2018	2024 →

3 seats from Islamabad in the National Assembly
- Registered: 765,445 ▲
- Turnout: 58.24% ▼4.02%
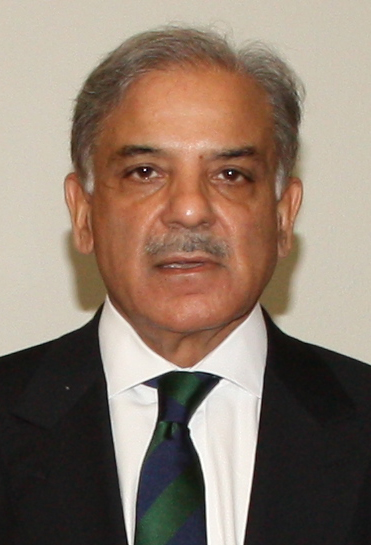
	First party	Second party
Leader	Imran Khan	Shehbaz Sharif
Party	PTI	PML(N)
Last election	1	1
Seats won	3	0
Seat change	▲2	▼1
Popular vote	215,077	110,920
Percentage	48.24%	24.88%
Swing	▲14.58%	▼12.64%
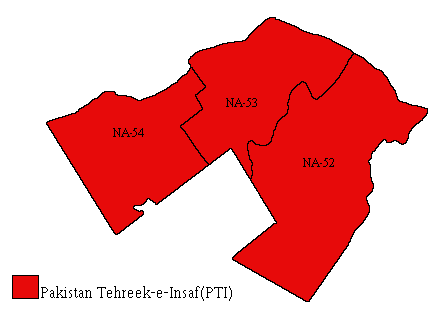

General elections were held in the Islamabad Capital Territory on Wednesday, 25 July 2018 to elect the 3 members of 15th National Assembly from Islamabad.

The Pakistan Tehreek-e-Insaf (PTI) swept Islamabad winning all 3 seats with huge margin.

== Candidates ==
A total number of 69 Candidates, including 33 Independents, contested for the 3 National Assembly Seats from Islamabad.

No.	Constituency	Candidates		
No.	Constituency	PTI	PML-N	PPP
1	NA-52	Khurram Shehzad Nawaz	Tariq Fazal Chaudhry	Muhammad Afzal Khokhar
2	NA-53	Imran Khan	Shahid Khaqan Abbasi	Syed Sibtul Haider Bukhari
3	NA-54	Asad Umar	Anjum Aqeel Khan	Raja Imran Ashraf

== Result ==
Vote Share of different parties in the election.
1. PTI (48.24%)
2. PML-N (24.88%)
3. PPP (12.58%)
4. Others (14.3%)
Seat Share of different parties in the election.
1. PTI (100%)

Party Wise

Party	Seats		Votes	
Party	Contested	Won	#	%
Pakistan Tehreek-e-Insaf	3	3	215,077	48.24
Pakistan Muslim League (N)	3	0	110,920	24.88
Pakistan Peoples Party	3	0	56,079	12.58
Total		3	445,827	100.0

=== Constituency wise ===
No.	Constituency	Turnout	Elected Member	Party	Runner-up	Party	Win Margin (by votes)	Win Margin (by % votes)
1	NA-52	64.26 ▲	Khurram Shehzad Nawaz	Pakistan Tehreek-e-Insaf	Muhammad Afzal Khokhar	Pakistan Peoples Party	30,794	20.44
2	NA-53	56.53 ▲	Imran Khan	Pakistan Tehreek-e-Insaf	Shahid Khaqan Abbasi	Pakistan Muslim League (N)	48,763	27.64
3	NA-54	54.24▲	Asad Umar	Pakistan Tehreek-e-Insaf	Anjum Aqeel Khan	Pakistan Muslim League (N)	24,077	20.29

== By-election ==
After the General Elections, the chairman of the PTI, Imran Khan vacated NA-53 in favour of NA-95 (Mianwali-I). By-elections were held on 14 October 2018. Ali Nawaz Awan of the PTI won the seat by a margin of 18,630 votes.
