= 2024 Pakistani general election in Islamabad =

- 8 February 2024

3 seats from Islamabad in the National Assembly
- Registered: 1,083,028
- Turnout: 55.23% ▼3.01pp
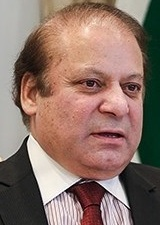

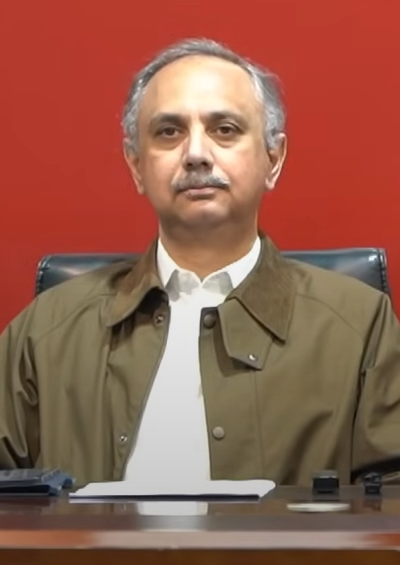
	First party	Second party
Leader	Nawaz Sharif (Note: Nawaz Sharif led the PML-N election campaign and would have become Prime Minister in the case that they won a majority of seats, with Shehbaz Sharif the candidate otherwise.)	Omar Ayub Khan (Note: Served as candidate for Prime Minister appointed by Imran Khan.)
Party	PML(N)	IND (backed by PTI) (Note: Contested as independent candidates in all constituencies) (Note: Although the PTI did not contest the election de jure, media coverage routinely counted the PTI-affiliated independents as a single bloc in their election reports: "Pakistan General Elections 2024 Candidates Party and List". ARYNEWS. Archived from the original on 11 February 2024.; "LIVE: Pakistan election results 2024 — Who is going to form next govt? PML-N, PPP step up efforts". www.geo.tv. Archived from the original on 11 February 2024.; "National Assembly Election Results 2024". elections.dunyanews.tv. Archived from the original on 11 February 2024.; "Never won a war, never lost an election: Did Imran Khan spoil Pakistan military's record?". The Times of India. 11 February 2024. Archived from the original on 11 February 2024.; Asrar, Nadim; Lodhi, Areesha. "Pakistan police threaten crackdown after Khan's PTI protests vote 'rigging'". Al Jazeera. Archived from the original on 11 February 2024.)
Last election	24.88%, 0 seats	48.24%, 3 seats
Seats won	2	0
Seat change	▲2	▼3
Popular vote	184,111	193,283
Percentage	30.95%	32.49%
Swing	▲6.07pp	▼15.75pp
- The results map, by constituency

General elections were held in the Islamabad Capital Territory on 8 February 2024 to elect the 3 members of 15th National Assembly from Islamabad.

The Pakistan Muslim League (N) (PML(N)) won 2 of the 3 seats available, while an independent candidate was elected to the other seat.

== Candidates ==
A total number of 113 candidates, including 74 non-PTI independents, contested for the three National Assembly seats in Islamabad.

No.	Constituency	Candidates	
No.	Constituency	PMLN	PTI-IND
1	NA-46	Anjum Aqeel Khan	Amir Mughal
2	NA-47	Tariq Fazal Chaudhry	Shoaib Shaheen
3	NA-48	N/A	Muhammad Ali Bokhari

== Results ==
Vote Share of different parties in the election.
1. PTI (32.5%)
2. PML-N (30.9%)
3. TLP (5.01%)
4. JI (4.78%)
5. PPP (4.40%)
6. Others (22.4%)
Seat Share of different parties in the election.
1. PML(N) (66.7%)
2. IND (33.3%)

=== Party-wise results ===
Party	Seats		Votes	
Party	Contested	Won	#	%
Pakistan Tehreek-e-Insaf	3	0	193,283	32.49
Pakistan Muslim League (N)	2	2	184,111	30.95
Tehreek-e-Labbaik Pakistan	3	0	29,811	5.01
Jamaat-e-Islami Pakistan	3	0	28,442	4.78
Pakistan Peoples Party	3	0	26,174	4.40
Independents	N/A	1	133,006	22.36
Others	N/A	1	133,006	22.36
Total		3	594,827	100.0

=== Constituency-wise results ===
Constituency	Winner				Runner-up				Margin	Turnout
Constituency	Candidate	Party	Votes		Candidate	Party	Votes		Margin	Turnout
Constituency	Candidate	Party	No.	%	Candidate	Party	No.	%	No.	%
NA-46	Anjum Aqeel Khan	PML(N)	82,536	51.18	Amir Mughal	PTI	46,313	28.72	36,223	46.30
NA-47	Tariq Fazal Chaudhry	PML(N)	101,575	40.32	Shoaib Shaheen	PTI	87,105	34.58	14,470	58.39
NA-48	Khurram Shehzad Nawaz	IND	69,701	38.37	Muhammad Ali Bokhari	PTI	59,865	32.95	9,836	61.11

== Aftermath ==
The independent candidate elected to NA-48 later joined the Pakistan Muslim League (N). As a result, all members in the 16th National Assembly of Pakistan from Islamabad belonged to the PML(N).

=== Audit by PATTAN-Coalition38 ===
On 18 May 2024, PATTAN-Coalition38 conducted a detailed audit of all three constituencies. This audit revealed that all of the declared winners had received fewer votes than their runners-up. The audit involved collecting polling station-level results (Forms 45) from the candidates, totaling the results across polling stations, comparing them with the constituency-level results (Form 47), and comparing the Forms 45 that were collected in the days following February 8 with the ones uploaded by the Election Commission of Pakistan (ECP) on 6 March.

They were able to collect 87%, 97%, and 90% of Forms 45 from NA-46, NA-47, and NA-48, respectively. In NA-46, the results of the audit indicated that PTI-backed Amir Mughal received 75,608 votes, while Anjum Aqeel Khan, the declared winner from the PML(N), received 38,607 votes, indicating a reversal of 73,224 votes in the official results by the ECP. Moreover, they found discrepancies between the collected and uploaded Forms 45 in more than 200 out of 342 polling stations. In NA-47, as per the audit, PTI-backed Shoaib Shaheen bagged 101,061 votes and Tariq Fazal Chaudhry of the PML(N) bagged 49,528 votes, indicating a reversal of 66,003 votes in the final ECP results. They also found discrepancies between the two groups of Forms 45 in 198 out of 387 polling stations. Lastly, in NA-48, the audit revealed that PTI-backed Muhammad Ali Bokhari received 70,318 votes, while the declared winner, independent Khurram Shehzad Nawaz received 26,874 votes, indicating a reversal of 53,280 votes. The audit claimed discrepancies in 91 out of 261 polling stations.
