= 2002 Pakistani general election in Islamabad =

← 1997	10 October 2002	2008 →

2 seats from Islamabad in the National Assembly
- Registered: 383,603
- Turnout: 51.28 ▲5.24
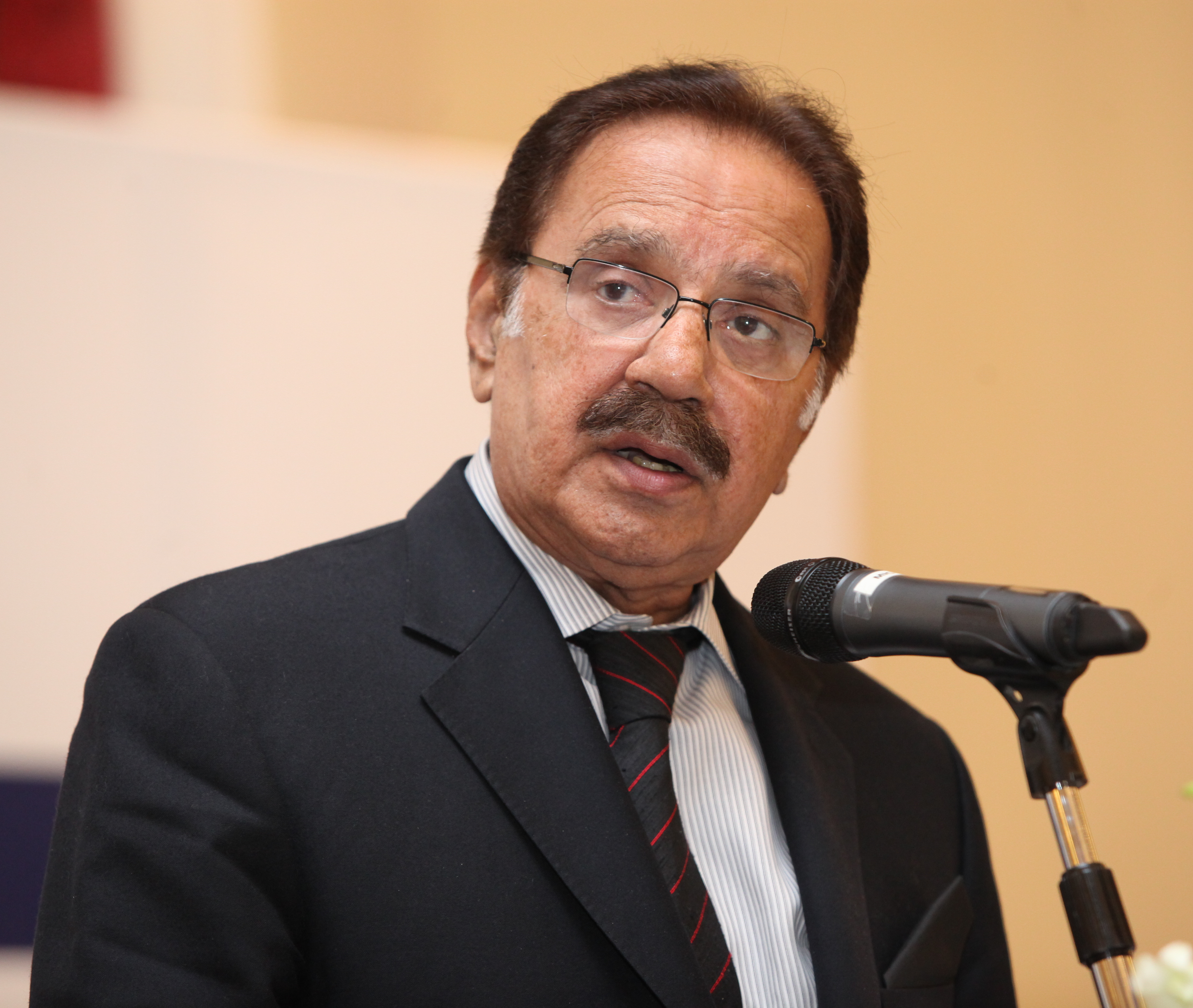

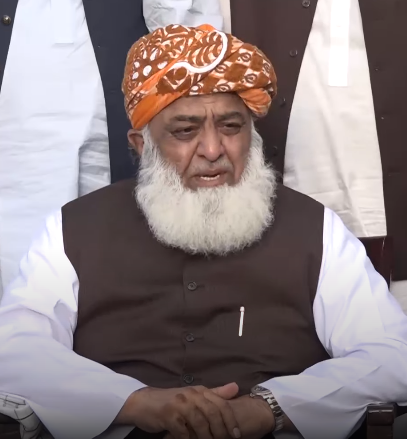

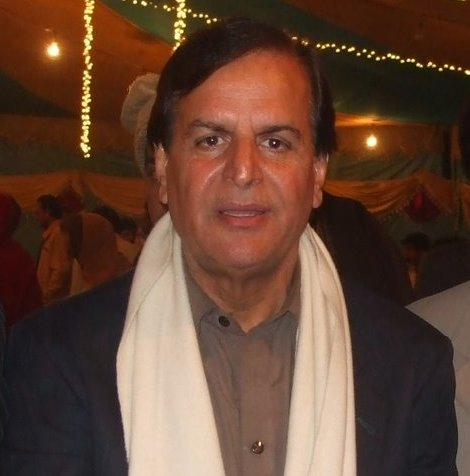

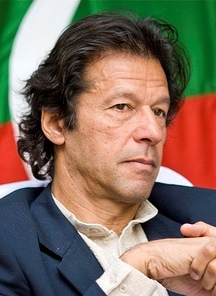
	First party	Second party	Third party
Leader	Ameen Faheem	Fazal-ur-Rehman	Javed Hashmi
Party	PPP	MMA	PML(N)
Leader since	2002	2002	2001
Last election	0	0	1
Seats won	1	1	0
Seat change	▲1	▲1	▼1
Popular vote	76,659	40,365	20,725
Percentage	38.97%	20.52%	10.54%
Swing	▲10.62	▲20.52	▼53.59
	Fourth party
Leader	Imran Khan
Party	PTI
Leader since	1996
Last election	0
Seats won	0
Seat change	Steady
Popular vote	12,850
Percentage	6.53%
Swing	▲0.95
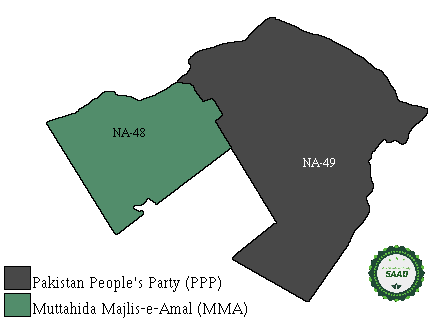

General elections were held in Islamabad Capital Territory on Thursday 10 October 2002 to elect 2 members of National Assembly of Pakistan from Islamabad.

Pakistan People's Party and Muttahida Majlis-e-Amal both won 1 seat from Islamabad by the margin of 11,590 and 17,868 votes respectively.

== Candidates ==
Total no of 28 Candidates including 8 Independents contested for 2 National Assembly Seats from Islamabad.

No.	Constituency	Candidates		
No.	Constituency	PPP	PML-N	PTI
1	NA-48	Babar Awan	Zafar Ali Shah	Ahmad Raza Khan Kasuri
2	NA-49	Nayyar Hussain Bukhari	Tariq Fazal Chaudhry	Rab Nawaz Chaudhry

== Result ==
Vote Share of different parties in the election.
1. PPP (38.97%)
2. MMA (20.52%)
3. PML-N (10.54%)
4. PTI (6.53%)
5. Others and Independents (22.49%)
Seat Share of different parties in the election.
1. PPP (50%)
2. MMA (50%)

Party Wise

Party	Seats		Votes	
Party	Contested	Won	#	%
Pakistan Peoples Party	2	1	76,659	38.97
Muttahida Majlis-e-Amal	1	1	40,365	20.52
Pakistan Muslim League (N)	2	0	20,725	10.54
Pakistan Tehreek-e-Insaf	2	0	12,850	6.53
Others & Independents	21	0	44,243	22.49
Rejected		0	1,881	0.95
Total	28	2	196,723	100.0

=== Constituency wise ===
No.	Constituency	Turnout	Elected Member	Party	Runner-up	Party	Win Margin (by votes)	Win Margin (by % votes)
1	NA-48	46.74	Mian Muhammad Aslam	MMA	Babar Awan	Pakistan Peoples Party	11,590	13.14
2	NA-49	55.31	Nayyar Hussain Bukhari	Pakistan Peoples Party	Mustafa Nawaz Khokhar	Independent	17,868	16.47
