= 2008 Pakistani general election in Islamabad =

← 2002	18 February 2008	2013 →

2 seats from Islamabad in the National Assembly
- Registered: 482,801
- Turnout: 50.03 ▼1.25
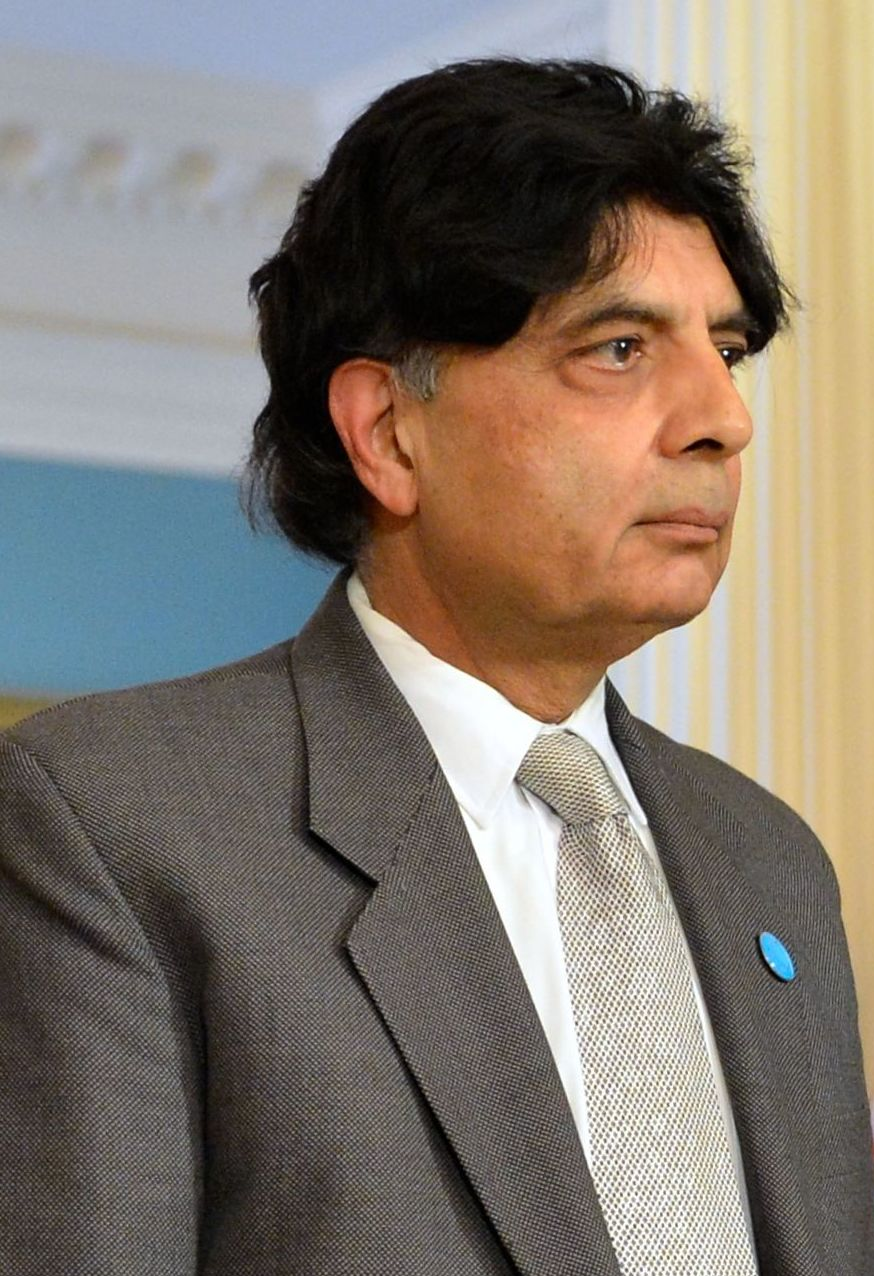

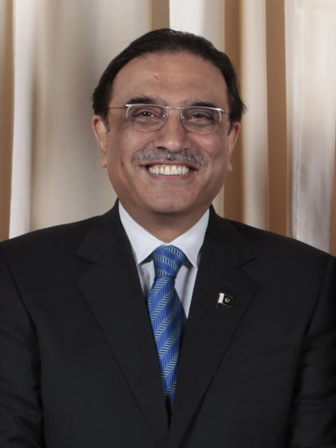

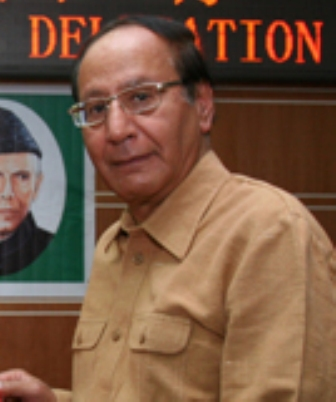

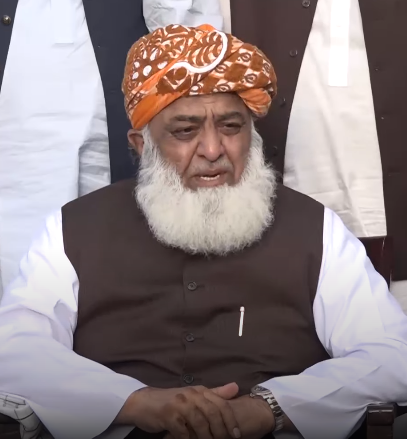
	First party	Second party	Third party
Leader	Nisar Ali Khan	Asif Ali Zardari	Shujaat Hussain
Party	PML(N)	PPP	PML(Q)
Leader since	2005	2007	2003
Last election	0	0	0
Seats won	2	0	0
Seat change	▲2	▼1	Steady
Popular vote	106,962	71,211	45,029
Percentage	44.29%	29.48%	18.64%
Swing	▲33.75%	▼9.49%	▲16.55%
	Fourth party
Leader	Fazal-ur-Rehman
Party	MMA
Leader since	2002
Last election	1
Seats won	0
Seat change	▼1
Popular vote	1,257
Percentage	0.52%
Swing	▼20%
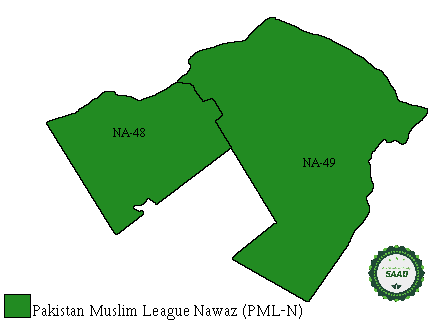

General elections were held in Islamabad Capital Territory on Monday 18 February 2008 to elect 2 member of National Assembly of Pakistan from Islamabad.

Pakistan Muslim League (N) won both seats from Islamabad with comfortable margin.

== Candidates ==
Total no of 34 Candidates including 19 Independents contested for 2 National Assembly Seats from Islamabad.

No.	Constituency	Candidates		
No.	Constituency	PPP	PML-N	PML-Q
1	NA-48	Israr Hussain	Anjum Aqeel Khan	Rizwan Sadiq Khan
2	NA-49	Nayyar Hussain Bukhari	Tariq Fazal Chaudhry	Mustafa Nawaz Khokhar

== Result ==
Vote Share of different parties in the election.
1. PML-N (44.29%)
2. PPP (29.48%)
3. PML-Q (18.64%)
4. MMA (0.52%)
5. Others and Independents (6.43%)
Seat Share of different parties in the election.
1. PML-N (100%)

Party Wise

Party	Seats		Votes	
Party	Contested	Won	#	%
Pakistan Muslim League (N)	2	2	106,962	44.29
Pakistan Peoples Party	2	0	71,211	29.48
Pakistan Muslim League (Q)	2	0	45,029	18.64
Muttahida Majlis-e-Amal	2	0	1,257	0.52
Pakistan Tehreek-e-Insaf	Boycotted	0	0	0
Others & Independents	26	0	15,541	6.43
Rejected		0	1,531	0.63
Total	34	2	241,531	100.0

=== Constituency wise ===
No.	Constituency	Turnout	Elected Member	Party	Runner-up	Party	Win Margin (by votes)	Win Margin (by % votes)
1	NA-48	43.75	Anjum Aqeel Khan	Pakistan Muslim League (N)	Israr Hussain	Pakistan Peoples Party	34,995	33.34
2	NA-49	56.23	Tariq Fazal Chaudhry	Pakistan Muslim League (N)	Nayyar Hussain Bukhari	Pakistan Peoples Party	765	0.55
