= 2013 Pakistani general election in Islamabad =

← 2008	11 May 2013	2018 →

2 seats from Islamabad in the National Assembly
- Registered: 626,383
- Turnout: 62.26 ▲12.23
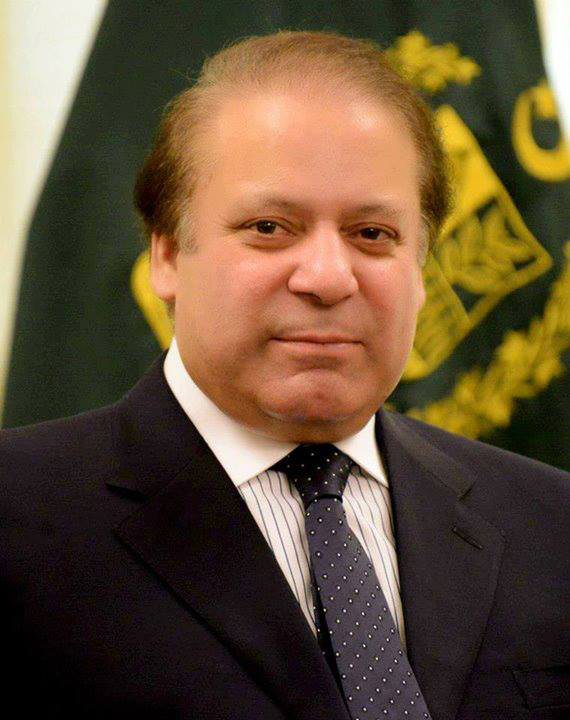

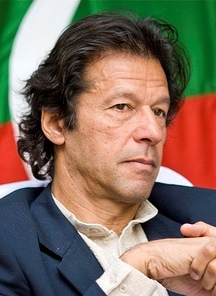
	First party	Second party
Leader	Nawaz Sharif	Imran Khan
Party	PML(N)	PTI
Leader since	2011	1996
Last election	0	Boycotted
Seats won	1	1
Seat change	▼1	▲1
Popular vote	146,311	131,261
Percentage	37.52%	33.66%
Swing	▼6.77%	▲15.02%
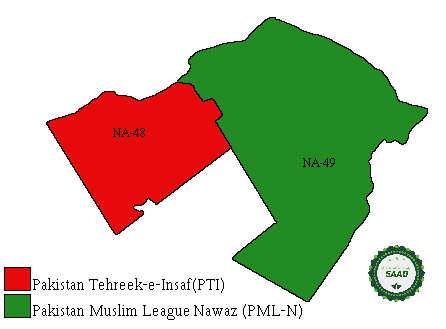

General elections were held in Islamabad Capital Territory on Saturday 11 May 2013 to elect 2 member of National Assembly of Pakistan from Islamabad.

Pakistan Muslim League (N) and Pakistan Tehreek-e-Insaf won one seat each from Islamabad.

== Candidates ==
Total no of 77 Candidates including 43 Independents contested for 2 National Assembly Seats from Islamabad.

No.	Constituency	Candidates	
No.	Constituency	PML-N	PTI
1	NA-48	Anjum Aqeel Khan	Javed Hashmi
2	NA-49	Tariq Fazal Chaudhry	Ch Ilyas Meherban

== Result ==
Vote Share of different parties in the election.
1. PML-N (37.52%)
2. PTI (33.66%)
3. PPP (13.89%)
4. JI (8.97%)
5. Others and Independents (5.33%)
Seat Share of different parties in the election.
1. PTI (50%)
2. PML-N (50%)

Party Wise

Party	Seats		Votes	
Party	Contested	Won	#	%
Pakistan Muslim League (N)	2	1	146,311	37.52
Pakistan Tehreek-e-Insaf	2	1	131,261	33.66
Pakistan Peoples Party	2	0	54,162	13.89
Jamaat-e-Islami Pakistan	2	0	35,016	8.97
Others & Independents	69	0	20,803	5.33
Rejected		0	2,448	0.63
Total	77	2	390,001	100.0

=== Constituency wise ===
No.	Constituency	Turnout	Elected Member	Party	Runner-up	Party	Win Margin (by votes)	Win Margin (by % votes)
1	NA-48	59.64	Javed Hashmi	Pakistan Tehreek-e-Insaf	Anjum Aqeel Khan	Pakistan Muslim League (N)	21,673	12.44
2	NA-49	64.56	Tariq Fazal Chaudhry	Pakistan Muslim League (N)	Ch Ilyas Meherban	Pakistan Tehreek-e-Insaf	36,723	17.02

== By-Elections ==
Makhdoom Javed Hashmi Vacated his seat in Favor of NA-149 Multan. Asad Umar of Pakistan Tehreek-e-Insaf Won NA-48 by margin of 6,887 votes. Turn out was 32% which was low compared to 59.64% in General Elections.
