= Mustafa Nawaz Khokhar =

Pakistani politician (born 1970)

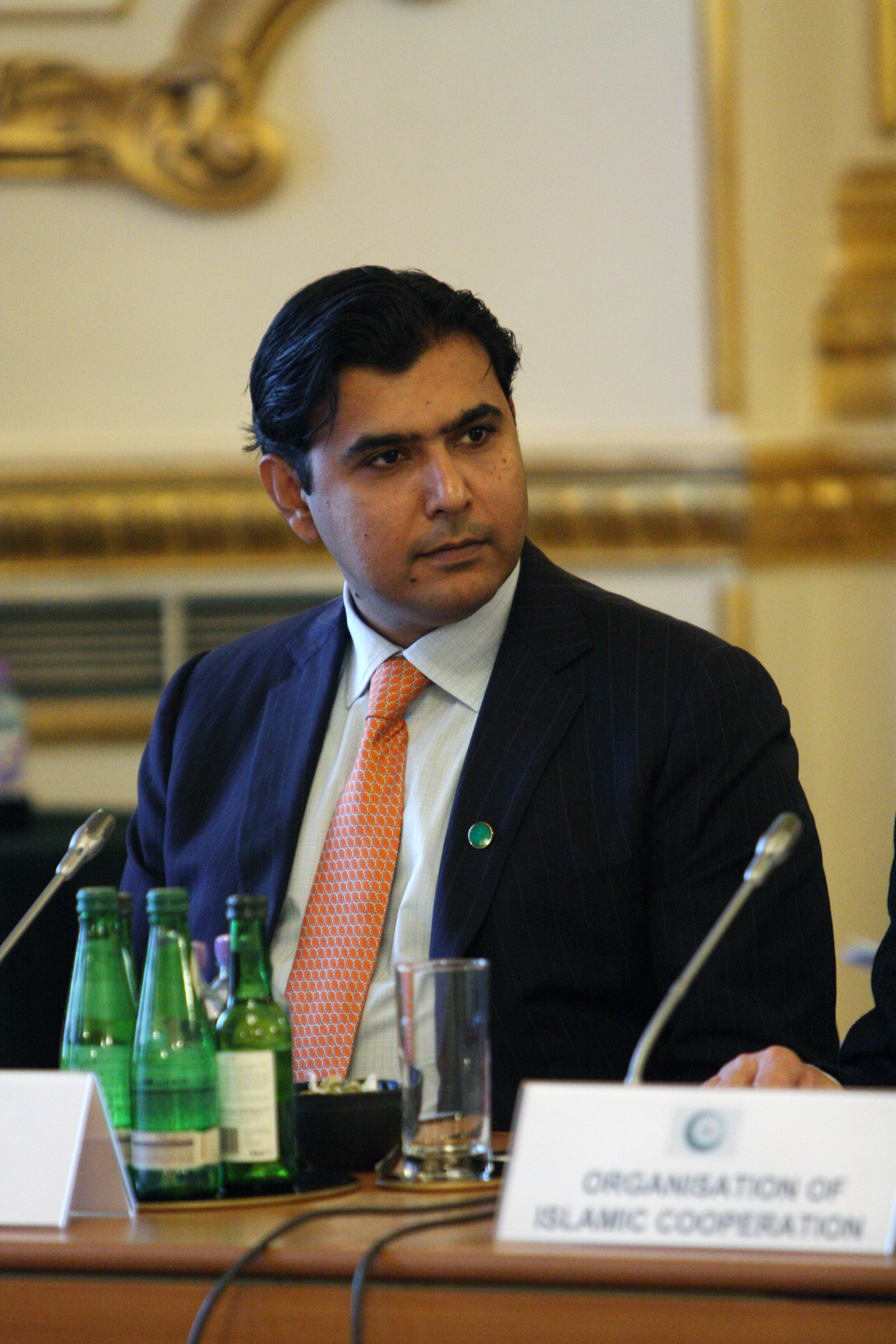
- Mustafa Khokhar in 2013

Chairman of the Senate Human Rights Committee
- In office 11 March 2018 – 10 November 2022

Member of the Senate of Pakistan
- In office 11 March 2018 – 10 November 2022
- Chairman: Sadiq Sanjrani

Adviser to the Prime Minister on Human Rights
- In office 25 June 2012 – 16 March 2013
- President: Asif Ali Zardari
- Prime Minister: Raja Pervaiz Ashraf
- In office 3 May 2011 – 19 June 2012
- President: Asif Ali Zardari
- Prime Minister: Yusuf Raza Gillani

Personal details
- Born: 13 July 1970 (age 55)
- Party: AP (2026-present)
- Other political affiliations: PPP (2013–2022); PML(Q) (2008–2013)
- Parent: Haji Muhammad Nawaz Khokhar (father)
- Relatives: Taji Khokhar (uncle)
- Education: Cadet College Hasan Abdal

Mustafa Nawaz Khokhar (born 13 July 1970) is a human rights activist and former senator from Pakistan. He served as a member of the Senate of Pakistan from 2018 to 2022, representing the Pakistan Peoples Party. He also served as an adviser to the prime minister on human rights from 2011 to 2013. He stepped down from his senate seat in 2022, expressing his discontent with the party’s direction.

== Early life and education ==
His late father Nawaz Khokhar was an early member of the Pakistan People's Party (PPP), even being its secretary general for Rawalpindi, before parting ways and joining Nawaz Sharif but ultimately coming back to the PPP camp later on.

Like his father Mustafa is a law graduate, having studied in the United Kingdom.

== Political career ==
He ran for the National Assembly of Pakistan from NA-49 Islamabad-II as an independent candidate in the 2002 Pakistani general election, but was unsuccessful. He received 30,016 votes and was defeated by Nayyar Hussain Bukhari, a candidate of the Pakistan People's Party (PPP).

He ran for the National Assembly from NA-49 Islamabad-II as a candidate of the Pakistan Muslim League (Q) (PML(Q)) in the 2008 Pakistani general election, but was unsuccessful. He received 34,546 votes and was defeated by Tariq Fazal Chaudhry, a candidate of the Pakistan Muslim League (N) (PML(N)).

He ran for the National Assembly from NA-49 Islamabad-II as a candidate of the PPP in the 2013 Pakistani general election, but was unsuccessful. He received 44,646 votes and was defeated by Tariq Fazal Chaudhry, a candidate of the PML(N).

Khokhar was elected to the Senate of Pakistan as a candidate of Pakistan Peoples Party on general seat from Sindh in the 2018 Pakistani Senate election. He took oath as Senator on 12 March 2018.

=== Resignation from the Senate ===
On 10 November 2022, he announced to leave his position in the upper house of parliament, Senate of Pakistan Mustafa publicly and submitted his resignation as a senator.

== Writings ==
He has written articles and op-eds, including for The Guardian.
