= 1993 Pakistani general election in Islamabad =

← 1990	6 October 1993	1997 →

1 seat from Islamabad in the National Assembly
- Registered: 211,821
- Turnout: 57.51 ▲0.21
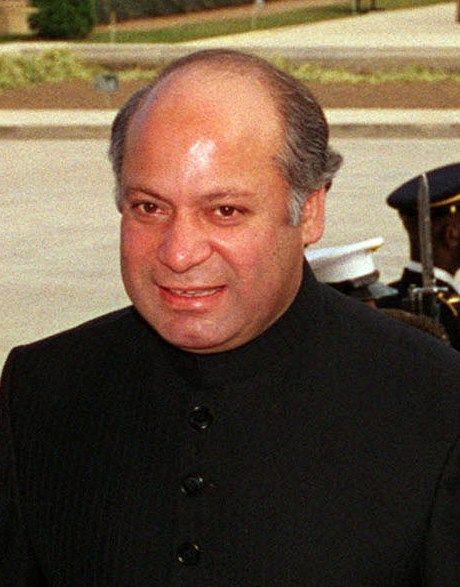

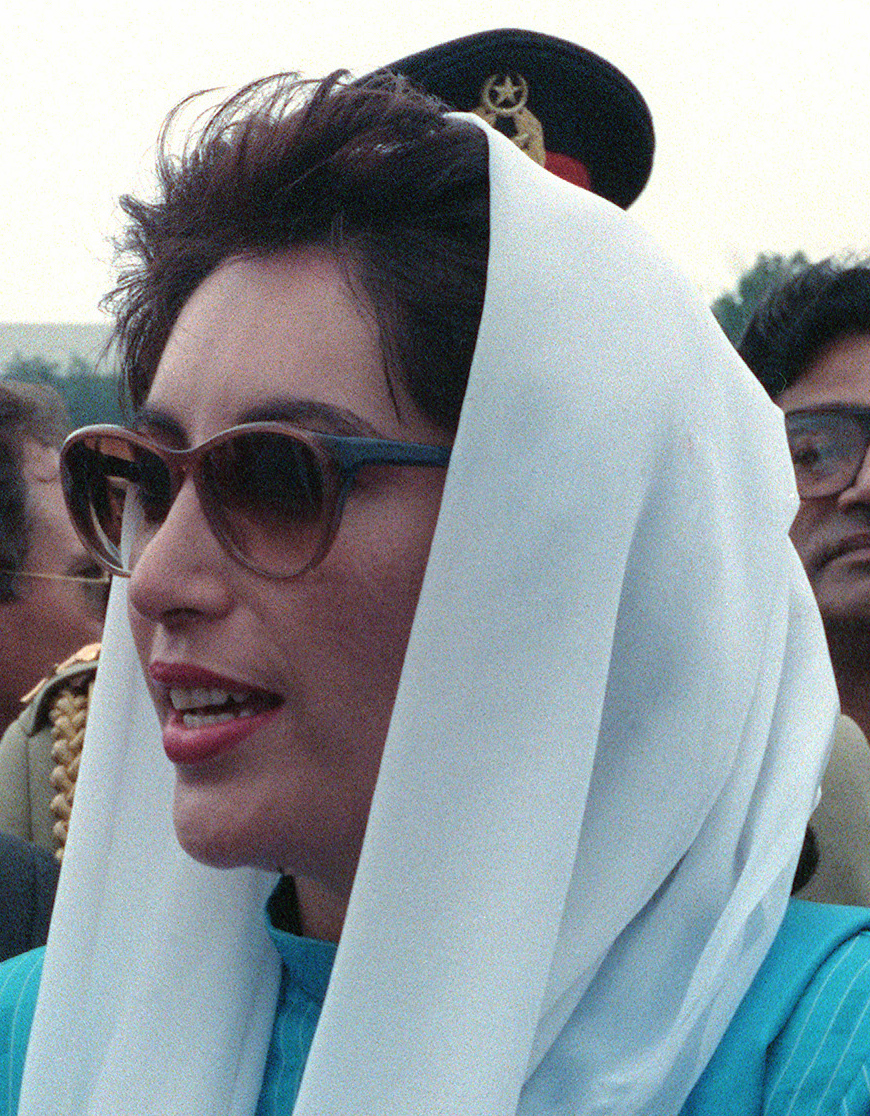
	First party	Second party
Leader	Nawaz Sharif	Benazir Bhutto
Party	PML(N)	PPP
Leader since	1985	1988
Last election	0	0
Seats won	1	0
Seat change	Steady	Steady
Popular vote	59,308	49,518
Percentage	48.68%	40.65%
Swing	▼3.49	▲0.72
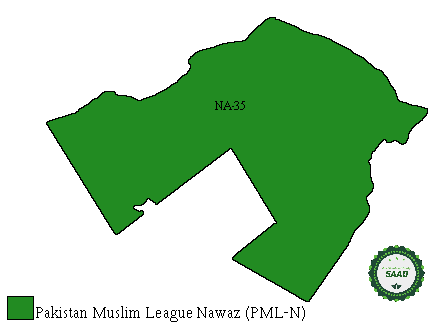

General elections were held in Islamabad Capital Territory on Wednesday 6 October 1993 to elect 1 member of National Assembly of Pakistan from Islamabad.

Pakistan Muslim League (N) won Islamabad seat by the margin of 9,790 votes.

== Candidates ==
Total no of 11 Candidates including 4 Independents contested for 1 National Assembly Seat from Islamabad.

No.	Constituency	Candidates	
No.	Constituency	PPP	PML-N
1	NA-35	Nayyar Hussain Bukhari	M Nawaz Khokhar

== Result ==
Vote Share of different parties in the election.
1. PML-N (48.68%)
2. PPP (40.65%)
3. Others and Independents (9.33%)
Seat Share of different parties in the election.
1. PML-N (100%)

Party Wise

Party	Seats		Votes	
Party	Contested	Won	#	%
Pakistan Muslim League (N)	1	1	59,308	48.68
Pakistan Peoples Party	1	0	49,518	40.65
Others & Independents	9	0	11,369	9.33
Rejected		0	1,626	1.33
Total	11	1	121,821	100.0

=== Constituency wise ===
No.	Constituency	Turnout	Elected Member	Party	Runner-up	Party	Win Margin (by votes)	Win Margin (by % votes)
1	NA-35	57.51	M Nawaz Khokhar	Pakistan Muslim League (N)	Nayyar Hussain Bukhari	Pakistan Peoples Party	9,790	8.04
