= 1997 Pakistani general election in Islamabad =

← 1993	3 February 1997	2002 →

1 seat from Islamabad in the National Assembly
- Registered: 228,651
- Turnout: 46.04 ▼11.47
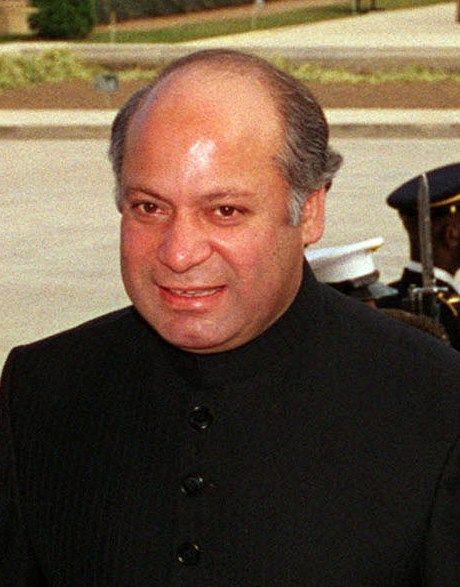

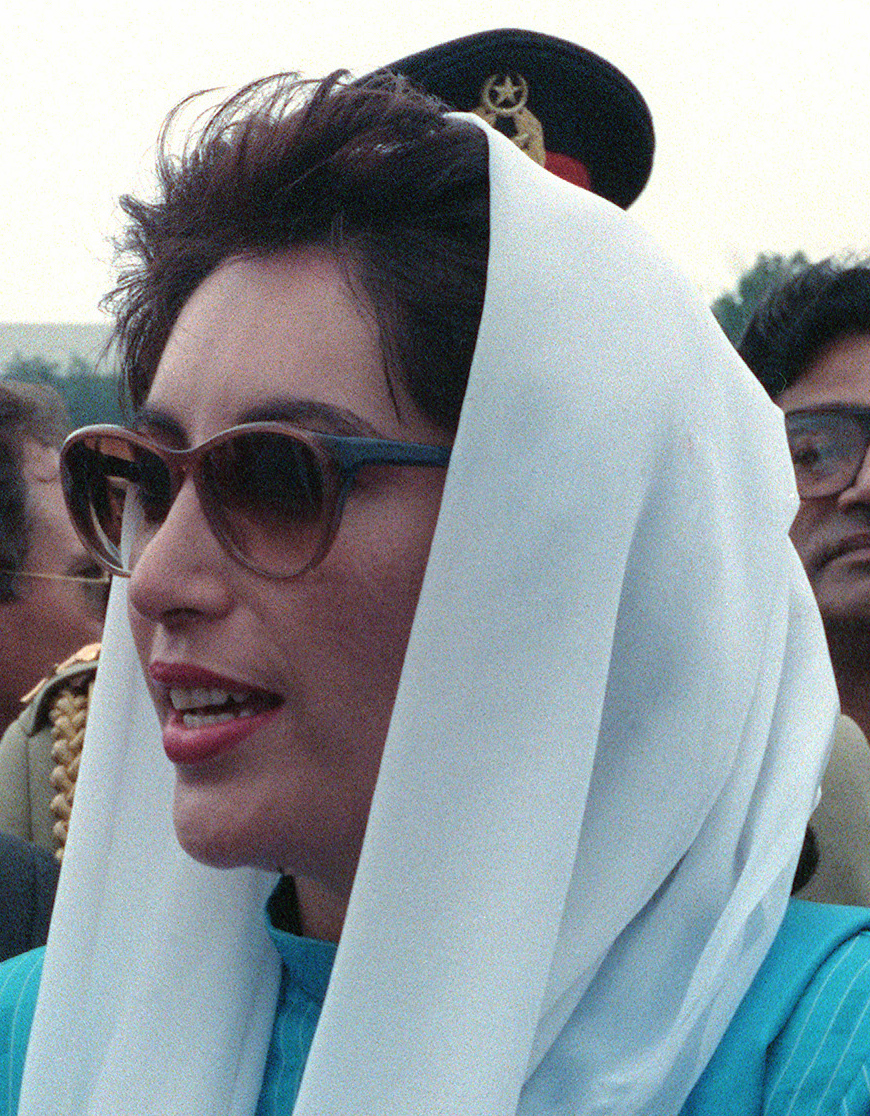

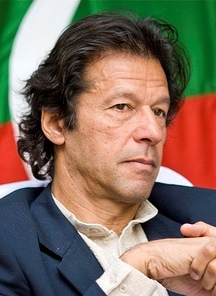
	First party	Second party	Third party
Leader	Nawaz Sharif	Benazir Bhutto	Imran Khan
Party	PML(N)	PPP	PTI
Leader since	1985	1988	1996
Last election	0	0	New
Seats won	1	0	0
Seat change	Steady	Steady	Steady
Popular vote	67,500	29,847	5,868
Percentage	64.13%	28.35%	5.58%
Swing	▲15.45	▼12.3	▲5.58
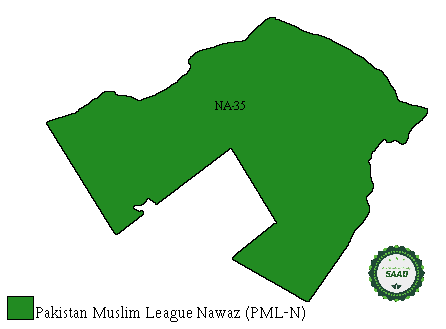

General elections were held in Islamabad Capital Territory on Monday 5 February 1997 to elect 1 member of National Assembly of Pakistan from Islamabad.

Pakistan Muslim League (N) won Islamabad seat by the margin of 37,653 votes.

== Candidates ==
Total no of 5 Candidates including 1 Independent contested for 1 National Assembly Seat from Islamabad. Legend Cricketer and Future Prime Minister Imran Khan also contested from Islamabad for the very first time.

No.	Constituency	Candidates		
No.	Constituency	PPP	PML-N	PTI
1	NA-35	Nayyar Hussain Bukhari	M Nawaz Khokhar	Imran Khan

== Result ==
Vote Share of different parties in the election.
1. PML-N (64.13%)
2. PPP (28.35%)
3. PTI (5.58%)
4. Others and Independents (0.93%)
Seat Share of different parties in the election.
1. PML-N (100%)

Party Wise

Party	Seats		Votes	
Party	Contested	Won	#	%
Pakistan Muslim League (N)	1	1	67,500	64.13
Pakistan Peoples Party	1	0	29,847	28.35
Pakistan Tehreek-e-Insaf	1	0	5,868	5.58
Others & Independents	2	0	984	0.93
Rejected		0	1,065	1.01
Total	5	1	121,821	100.0

=== Constituency wise ===
No.	Constituency	Turnout	Elected Member	Party	Runner-up	Party	Win Margin (by votes)	Win Margin (by % votes)
1	NA-35	57.51	M Nawaz Khokhar	Pakistan Muslim League (N)	Nayyar Hussain Bukhari	Pakistan Peoples Party	37,653	35.77
