= 1988 Pakistani general election in Islamabad =

← 1985	16 November 1988	1990 →

1 seat from Islamabad in the National Assembly
- Registered: 186,306
- Turnout: 57.91 ▼5.81

	First party	Second party	Third party
Leader	Benazir Bhutto	Haji M Nawaz Khokhar	Nawaz Sharif
Party	PPP	Independent	IJI
Last election	0	1	0
Seats won	1	0	0
Seat change	▲1	▼1
Popular vote	39,994	22,551	18,398
Percentage	37.07%	20.90%	17.05%
Swing	▲
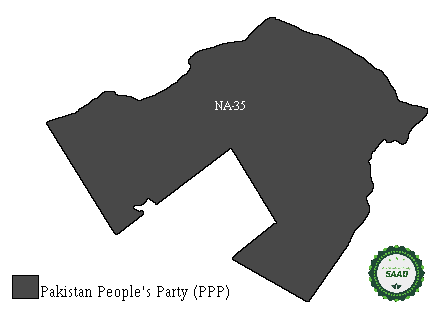

General elections were held in Islamabad Capital Territory on Wednesday, 16 November 1988 to elect 1 member of National Assembly of Pakistan from Islamabad.

Pakistan People's Party won Islamabad seat by 16,443 votes.

== Candidates ==
Total no of 15 Candidates including 8 Independents contested for 1 National Assembly Seat from Islamabad.

No.	Constituency	Candidates	
No.	Constituency	PPP	IJI
1	NA-35	Raja Pervaiz Khan	Sarfraz Ahmed Mir

== Result ==
Vote Share of different parties in the election.
1. PPP (37.07%)
2. Ind (21.82%)
3. IJI (17.05%)
4. Others and Independents (23.64%)
Seat Share of different parties in the election.
1. PPP (100%)

Party Wise

Party	Seats		Votes	
Party	Contested	Won	#	%
Pakistan Peoples Party	1	1	39,994	37.07
Independent	1	0	22,265	21.82
Islami Jamhoori Ittehad	1	0	18,398	17.05
Others & Independents	12	0	25,506	23.64
Rejected		0	1,730	1.6
Total	15	1	107,893	100.0

=== Constituency wise ===
No.	Constituency	Turnout	Elected Member	Party	Runner-up	Party	Win Margin (by votes)	Win Margin (by % votes)
1	NA-35	57.91	Raja Pervaiz Khan	Pakistan Peoples Party	M Nawaz Khokhar	Independent	16,443	15.24
