= NA-48 Islamabad-III =

Constituency of the National Assembly of Pakistan

- Constituency for the National Assembly of Pakistan
- Region: Rawat Town, Ghauri Town and rural areas of Islamabad Capital Territory
- Electorate: 292,380

Current constituency
- Created: 2018
- Party: Pakistan Muslim League (N)
- Member: Khurram Shehzad Nawaz
- Created from: NA-52 Islamabad-I

NA-48 Islamabad-III (این اے-۴۸، اسلام آباد-۳) is a constituency for the National Assembly of Pakistan.

== Area ==
This constituency consists of mostly rural areas of Islamabad Capital Territory including the residential compartments alongside Islamabad Expressway running up to Rawat and ending at the borders of Rawalpindi. Bani Gala is split into this constituency and NA-53 (Islamabad-II). These areas were previously part of now-abolished constituency of NA-49 Islamabad-II before the delimitation of 2018.

On a more granular basis, following areas are included in this constituency:

- Sihala
- Rawat
- Soan Gardens
- CBR Town
- Alipur and Farash
- Jandala
- Muhrian
- Kuri
- Pind Begwal
- Maira Begwal CH
- Tumair
- Tarlai Kalan
- Ghauri Town
- Bahria Town (Phase 1-6)
- PWD Housing Society
- Korang Town
- Tarlai Khurd

== Members of Parliament ==
=== 1977-2002: NA-35 Islamabad ===
Election	Member	Party
1977	Zahoor Ahmad	PPP
1985	Haji Muhammad Nawaz Khokhar	IND
1988	Raja Pervaiz Khan	PPP
1990	Haji Muhammad Nawaz Khokar	IJI
1993	Haji Muhammad Nawaz Khokar	PML-N
1997	Syed Zafar Ali Shah	PML-N

=== 2018–2023: NA-52 Islamabad-I ===
Election	Member	Party
2018	Khurram Shehzad Nawaz	PTI

=== 2024–present: NA-48 Islamabad-III ===
Election	Member	Party
2024	Khurram Shehzad Nawaz	PML(N)

== Election 2002 ==
General elections were held on 10 October 2002. Nayyar Hussain Bukhari of the Pakistan People's Party (PPP) won by 47,884 votes.

General election 2002: NA-49 Islamabad-II
Party	Candidate	Votes	%	±%
PPP	Nayyar Hussain Bukhari	47,884	44.65	
Independent	Mustafa Nawaz Khokhar	30,016	27.99	
PML(N)	Tariq Fazal Chaudhry	16,832	15.70	
PTI	Rab Nawaz Ch.	7,540	7.03	
PAT	Raja Muhammad Yamin Abbasi	2,009	1.87	
Others	Others (five candidates)	2,960	2.76	
Turnout		108,496	55.31	
Total valid votes		107,241	98.84	
Rejected ballots		1,255	1.16	
Majority		17,868	16.66	
Registered electors		196,177		

== Election 2008 ==
The result of general election 2008 in this constituency is given below.

=== Result ===
Dr. Tariq Fazal Chaudhary succeeded in the election 2008 and became the member of National Assembly.

General election 2008: NA-49 Islamabad-II
Party	Candidate	Votes	%	±%
PML(N)	Tariq Fazal Chaudhry	45,482	33.54	
PPP	Nayyar Hussain Bukhari	44,726	32.99	
PML(Q)	Mustafa Nawaz Khokhar	34,546	25.48	
Independent	Malik Tabarak Hussain	8,294	6.12	
Others	Others (seven candidates)	2,543	1.87	
Turnout		136,574	56.23	
Total valid votes		135,591	99.28	
Rejected ballots		983	0.72	
Majority		756	0.55	
Registered electors		242,877		
PML(N) gain from PPP				

== Election 2013 ==
General elections were held on 11 May 2013. Tariq Fazal Chudhary of PML-N easily defended his berth in the National Assembly and was hence re-elected.

General election 2013: NA-49 Islamabad-II
Party	Candidate	Votes	%	±%
PML(N)	Tariq Fazal Chaudhry	94,106	43.90	
PTI	Ch. Ilyas Meharban	57,383	26.77	
PPP	Mustafa Nawaz Khokhar	44,984	20.99	
Others	Others (twenty three candidates)	17,890	8.34	
Turnout		215,770	64.56	
Total valid votes		214,364	99.35	
Rejected ballots		1,406	0.65	
Majority		36,723	17.13	
Registered electors		334,241		
PML(N) hold				

== Election 2018 ==
General elections were held on 25 July 2018.

General election 2018: NA-52 Islamabad-I
Party	Candidate	Votes	%	±%
PTI	Khurram Shehzad Nawaz	64,690	42.93	
PPP	Muhammad Afzal Khokhar	34,072	22.61	
PML(N)	Tariq Fazal Chaudhry	33,519	22.24	
TLP	Rizwan Ahmed	11,984	7.95	
Others	Others (five candidates)	3,897	2.59	
Turnout		150,692	64.26	
Rejected ballots		2,530	1.68	
Majority		30,618	20.32	
Registered electors		234,508		
PTI gain from PML(N)				

== Election 2024 ==
General elections were held on 8 February 2024. Khurram Shehzad Nawaz won the election with 69,701 votes.

General election 2024: NA-48 Islamabad-III
Party	Candidate	Votes	%	±%
PML(N)	Khurram Shehzad Nawaz	69,701	38.37	N/A
PTI	Muhammad Ali Bokhari (Note: Filed nomination papers as PTI candidate but ECP allowed him to run as an Independent)	59,865	32.95	▼9.98
Independent	Mustafa Nawaz Khokhar	18,573	10.22	N/A
TLP	Azhar Mehmood	13,201	7.27	▼0.68
JI	Malik Abdul Aziz	8,478	4.67	N/A
Others	Others (thirty-one candidates)	11,846	6.52	
Turnout		182,875	61.11	▼3.15
Rejected ballots		1,211	0.66	
Majority		9,836	5.41	
Registered electors		299,247		
PML(N) gain from PTI				

== See also ==
- NA-47 Islamabad-II
- NA-49 Attock-I
