= Tarnol, Islamabad =

Tarnol
- Union council
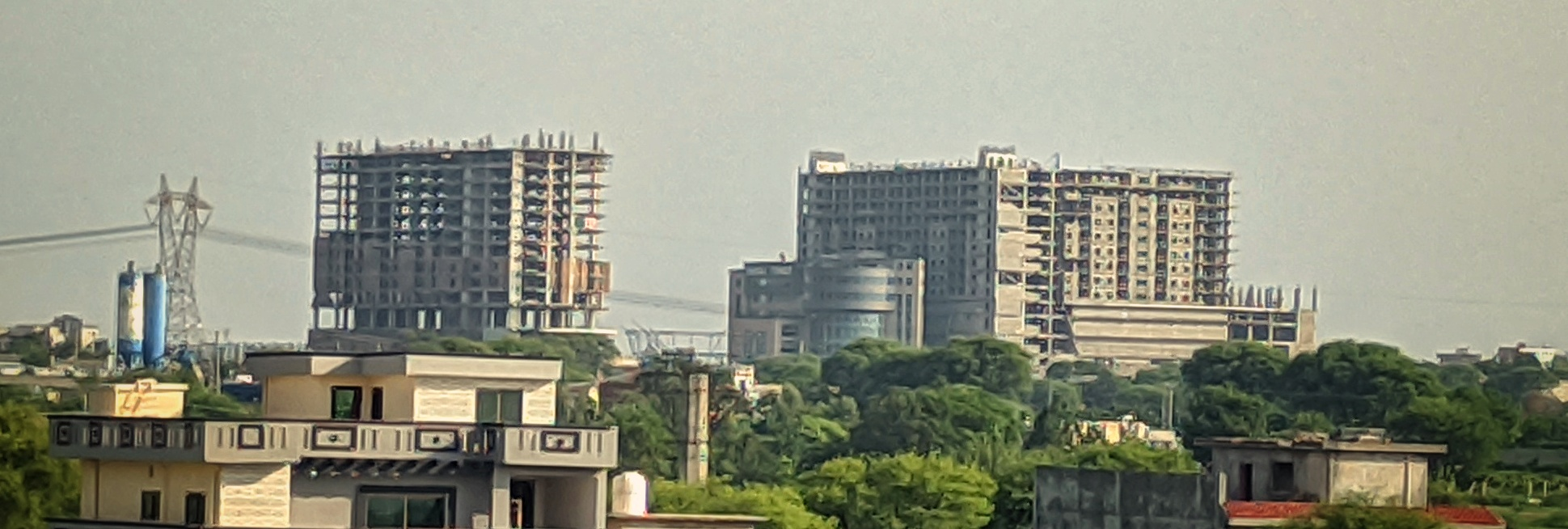
- Tarnol, Islamabad
- Interactive map of Tarnol
- Coordinates: 33°39′15″N 72°54′30″E
- Country: Pakistan
- Federal Capital: Islamabad Capital Territory
- District: Islamabad
- Tehsil: Islamabad

Tarnol is a small town and suburb located about 3 miles (4.8 km) north-west of Islamabad.

The primary languages of the area are Urdu, Western Punjabi (Panjistani) and Pashto. Tarnol is located at a 25 minute drive from the Zero Point and Islamabad International Airport. Most of the population commute to Islamabad or Rawalpindi for work. The town is at 549 metres (1,801 ft) above sea level. It has a population of nearly 20,000 residents. The coordinates for Tarnol are as follows: Latitude: 33.6494, Longitude: 72.9081.

Tarnol is part of NA-54 and UC-47.

Tarnol has gained some notoriety for an incident in March 2022 involving the sealing of 10 illegal tube wells by the Capital Development Authority of Islamabad in the noon.
