= 1990 Pakistani general election in Islamabad =

← 1988	24 October 1990	1993 →

1 seat from Islamabad in the National Assembly
- Registered: 189,972
- Turnout: 57.30 ▼0.61
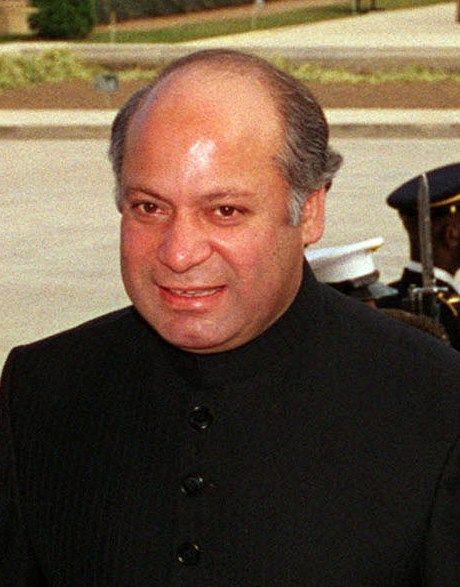

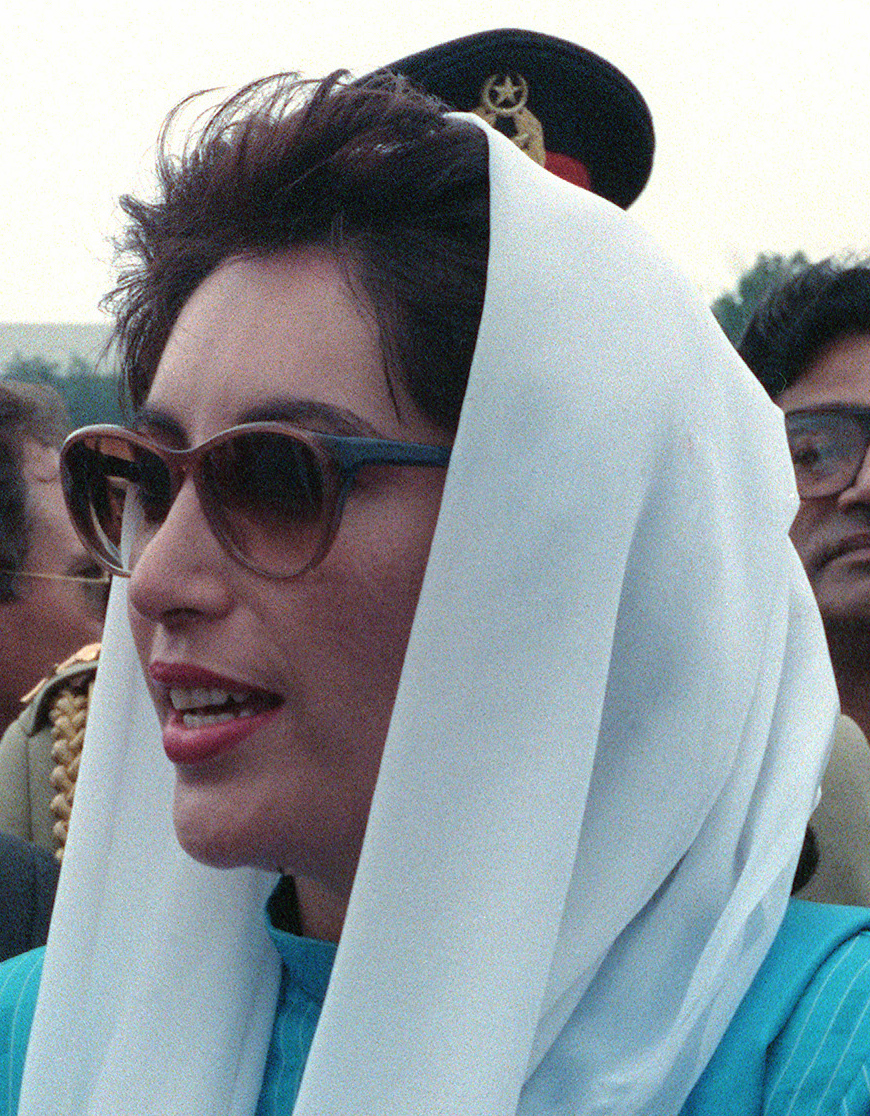
	First party	Second party
Leader	Nawaz Sharif	Benazir Bhutto
Party	PML(N)	PPP
Leader since	1985	1988
Last election	0	1
Seats won	1	0
Seat change	▲1	▼1
Popular vote	56,792	43,467
Percentage	52.18%	39.93%
Swing	▲35.13	▲2.86
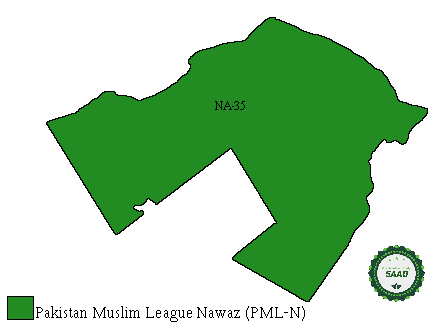

General elections were held in Islamabad Capital Territory on Wednesday, 24 October 1990 to elect 1 member of National Assembly of Pakistan from Islamabad.

Pakistan Muslim League (N) won Islamabad seat by the margin of 13,328 votes.

== Candidates ==
Total no of 13 Candidates including 7 Independents contested for 1 National Assembly Seat from Islamabad.

No.	Constituency	Candidates	
No.	Constituency	PPP	PML-N
1	NA-35	Raja Pervaiz Khan	M Nawaz Khokhar

== Result ==
Vote Share of different parties in the election.
1. PML-N 52.18 (45.8%)
2. PPP 39.93 (35.0%)
3. Others and Independents 21.82 (19.2%)
Seat Share of different parties in the election.
1. PML-N (100%)

Party Wise

Party	Seats		Votes	
Party	Contested	Won	#	%
Pakistan Muslim League (N)	1	1	56,795	52.18
Pakistan Peoples Party	1	0	43,467	39.93
Others & Independents	11	0	7,214	6.63
Rejected		0	1,374	1.26
Total	13	1	108,850	100.0

=== Constituency wise ===
No.	Constituency	Turnout	Elected Member	Party	Runner-up	Party	Win Margin (by votes)	Win Margin (by % votes)
1	NA-35	57.30	M Nawaz Khokhar	Pakistan Muslim League (N)	Raja Pervaiz Khan	Pakistan Peoples Party	13,328	12.24
