= Asad Umar =

Pakistani politician and business executive

Asad Umar SI
- اسدعمر
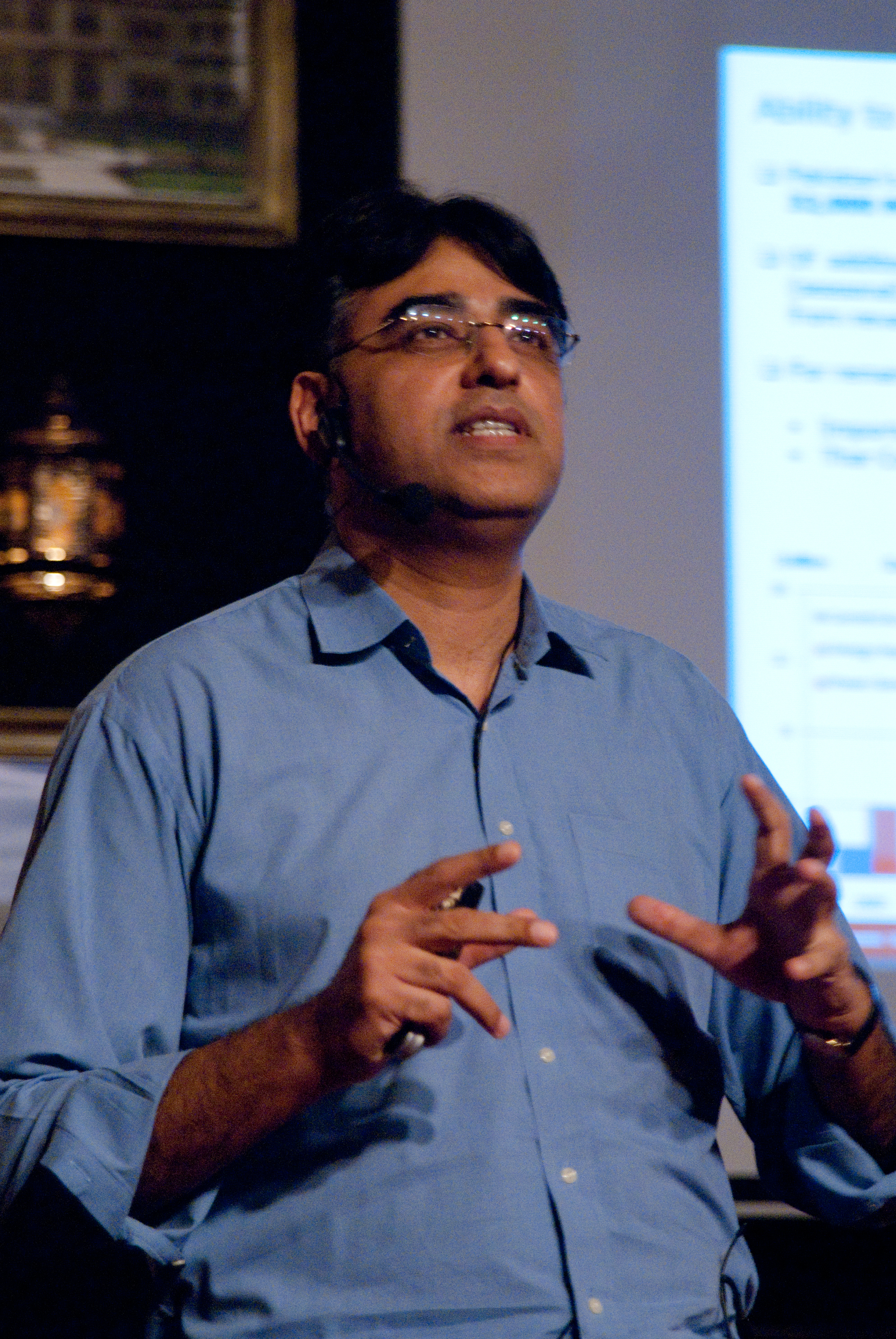

Minister for Planning, Development, Reforms and Special Initiatives
- In office 19 November 2019 – 10 April 2022
- President: Arif Alvi
- Prime Minister: Imran Khan
- Preceded by: Khusro Bakhtiar
- Succeeded by: Ahsan Iqbal

Chairman Standing Committee on Finance, Revenue and Economic Affairs
- In office 8 May 2019 – 30 November 2019
- President: Arif Alvi
- Prime Minister: Imran Khan
- Succeeded by: Faiz Ullah Kamoka

Minister for Finance, Revenue and Economic Affairs
- In office 20 August 2018 – 18 April 2019
- President: Arif Alvi
- Prime Minister: Imran Khan
- Deputy: Hammad Azhar (Minister of State for Revenue)
- Preceded by: Shamshad Akhtar (caretaker)
- Succeeded by: Abdul Hafeez Shaikh (Finance and Revenue Advisor), Hammad Azhar (Economic Affairs Minister)

Chairman Standing Committee on Industries and Production
- In office 2013–2018
- President: Mamnoon Hussain
- Prime Minister: Nawaz Sharif
- Succeeded by: Sajid Hussain Turi

Member of the National Assembly of Pakistan
- In office 13 August 2018 – 17 January 2023
- Constituency: NA-54 (Islamabad-III)
- In office 16 September 2013 – 31 May 2018
- Constituency: NA-48 (Islamabad-I)

Secretary General of the PTI
- In office 25 December 2021 – 24 May 2023
- Chairman: Imran Khan

Personal details
- Born: 8 September 1961 (age 65) Rawalpindi, Punjab, Pakistan
- Relatives: Muhammad Zubair Umar (brother)
- Education: Institute of Business Administration, Karachi
- Awards: Sitara-i-Imtiaz
- Website: asadumar.pk

Asad Umar (Urdu: اسد عمر; born 8 September 1961) is a Pakistani former business executive and politician who served as the Finance, Revenue, and Economic Affairs Minister of Pakistan from August 2018 to April 2019 and the Federal Minister for Planning, Development, Reforms and Special Initiatives from November 2019 to April 2022. Prior to entering politics, he served as the chief executive officer (CEO) of Engro from 2004 to 2012.

Asad entered politics in 2012 and served as secretary-general of Pakistan Tehreek-e-Insaf from December 2021 to 24 May 2023.

== Early life and education ==
Asad Umar was born in Rawalpindi in 1961 to a military family. His father, Ghulam Umar, who retired as a major general, was considered a close aide to President Yahya Khan and served as the first National Security Advisor from 1969 to 1971. He is also the youngest brother of Mohammad Zubair and is the youngest of six brothers and one sister. After his father's retirement from the military, he moved to Karachi along with his family.

Asad received an undergraduate degree in commerce (B.Com.) from the Government College of Commerce & Economics. He attended IBA Karachi in 1984 from where he received an MBA degree.

== Professional career ==
Asad Umar joined HSBC Pakistan after graduation and continued to work for HSBC for seven months. Later, he joined Exxon Chemical Pakistan in 1985 as a business analyst and was based in Canada. He was the only Pakistani employee of Exxon working abroad (in Canada) when the management buyout of Engro took place in 1991. He came back to Pakistan and in 1997 was appointed the first CEO of Engro Polymer & Chemicals, the group's petrochemical arm.

In 2004, Asad was appointed the president and CEO of Engro Corporation in 2004. He immediately made the company take a global perspective, becoming the first Pakistani private sector firm to hire US consulting firm McKinsey & Company to help create the Engro's strategy. As a result, Engro made changes to its corporate structure and went on a global expansion kick by buying out a US-based food company and beginning expansion into the fertiliser business in North Africa to supply the European market.

In 2009, he was awarded Sitara-i-Imtiaz for his public service.

He took an early retirement as president and CEO from Engro in April 2012 at the age of 50 amid speculation that he would pursue a political career.

Umar is credited with turning a chemical company into a major conglomerate and was considered one of the most popular and highly paid CEOs in Pakistan. During his tenure as CEO of Engro Corporation, Umar was paid about PKR 68.6 million for the year 2011.

== Political career ==
=== 2012–2018: Member of the National Assembly ===
He joined Pakistan Tehreek-e-Insaf (PTI) in 2012 and was made Senior Vice President.

He was elected to the National Assembly of Pakistan from Constituency NA-48 (Islamabad-I) as a candidate of PTI in the by-elections held in August 2013. He received 48,073 votes, defeated a candidate of Pakistan Muslim League (N) and became an MNA. In 2014, Lahore University of Management Sciences cancelled a scheduled speech of Umar due to being political in nature rather than educational.

=== Re-election and ministries (2018–2023) ===
He was re-elected to the National Assembly as a candidate of PTI from Constituency NA-54 (Islamabad-III) in the 2018 Pakistani general election. He received 56,945 votes and defeated Anjum Aqeel Khan and again became an MNA. After Pakistan General Elections 2018, Asad served in the following Standing Committees of the National Assembly:

- Special Committee on Agricultural Products.
- Non-Ministerial Standing Committee on Business Advisory.
- Standing Committee on Finance, Revenue and Economic Affairs. (Chairman Committee from 8 May 2019 till 30 November 2019)

Following his successful election, Umar was named as the potential candidate for the office of Minister for Finance, Revenue, and Economic Affairs. On 20 August 2018, he was sworn in as the Finance, Revenue and Economic Affairs Minister of Pakistan in the Federal Cabinet of Prime Minister Imran Khan. On 18 September 2018, he presented the amended finance bill for fiscal year 2018-2019 in the National Assembly.

On 11 October 2018, Umar held a meeting with Christine Lagarde, chair of the International Monetary Fund (IMF) and formally applied for a bailout package. That same month news reports emerged that Prime Minister Imran Khan had expressed dissatisfaction and reservations over Umar's performance as Minister for Finance, Revenue and Economic Affairs - the mentioned claims that were refuted. On 18 April 2019, he stepped down from the Finance Ministry.

From 8 May 2019 till 30 November 2019, Asad Umar served as the Chairman Standing Committee of the National Assembly of Pakistan for Finance, Revenue, and Economic Affairs. This is a key office as the chairman can ask the finance minister and his ministry regarding their performance. Moreover, the chairman can also give advice to the finance minister and the finance ministry regarding their policies. On 9 July 2019, Umar started working as the Member of Economic Advisory Council (Pakistan) after the recommendations of Prime Minister Khan.

He is working as the Focal Person for Supervision & Coordination amongst Government Agencies for All Mega Projects in Karachi funded by the Federal government of Pakistan since 1 November 2019.

On 30 September 2019, news emerged that Imran Khan will do a cabinet reshuffle, and Umar would return to the cabinet. On 19 November 2019, he was reinducted into Federal Cabinet and appointed Federal Minister for Planning, Development, Refor, and Special Initiatives. He was previously working as the Chairman of the cabinet committee on the China–Pakistan Economic Corridor.

On 20 March 2020, he was appointed the Chairman of Cabinet Committee on Energy, replacing Abdul Hafeez Shaikh. He also chaired the National Command and Operation Center (NCOC) that dealt with the COVID-19 pandemic in Pakistan.

=== Party positions ===
Chairman PTI Imran Khan appointed Asad Umar as PTI secretary-general on 25 December 2021. On 25 May 2023, Asad Umar resigned from his party position as Secretary General of PTI by condemning the attacks on 9 May.

=== Retirement ===
Following the arrest of party leader Imran Khan on 9 May 2023, and subsequent nationwide riots, the PTI faced a government crackdown that included the arrest of hundreds of prominent members.

In a press conference on 24 May 2023, Umar condemned the violence of 9 May and announced his resignation from party positions. Later in November 2023, he formally declared his departure from politics altogether, citing disagreement with the party's confrontational approach towards state institutions.
