= Khurram Shehzad Nawaz =

Pakistani politician

Raja Khurram Shehzad Nawaz
- راجہ خرم شہزاد نواز

Member of the National Assembly of Pakistan
- Incumbent
- Assumed office 29 February 2024
- Constituency: NA-48 Islamabad-III
- In office 13 August 2018 – 17 January 2023
- Constituency: NA-52 (Islamabad-I)

Personal details
- Party: IPP (2026-present)
- Other political affiliations: PMLN (2024-2026); PTI (2015-2023)

Raja Khurram Shehzad Nawaz is a Pakistani politician who has been a member of the National Assembly of Pakistan since February 2024 and previously served in this role from August 2018 till January 2023. In May 2024, a PATTAN-Coalition38 audit revealed manipulation in Khurram's election results, against his rival, Syed Mohammad Ali Bukhari.

== Political career ==
He was elected to the National Assembly of Pakistan as a candidate of Pakistan Tehreek-e-Insaf (PTI) from Constituency NA-52 (Islamabad-I) in the 2018 Pakistani general election. He received 64,690 votes and defeated Haji Afzal Khokhar, a candidate of Pakistan Peoples Party.

He was re-elected to the National Assembly as an independent candidate from Constituency NA-48 Islamabad-III in the 2024 Pakistani general election. He received 69,606 votes and defeated Syed Muhammad Ali Bukhari, a PTI-backed independent candidate who secured 59,851 votes. PTI alleged that rigging occurred in the constituency, leading the Islamabad High Court (IHC) to suspend Khurram's victory notification. He joined Pakistan Muslim League (N) (PML-N) after his election.

=== 2024 election audit results ===
In May 2024, a detailed audit by PATTAN-Coalition38 revealed that he received fewer votes in the 2024 elections compared to his rival PTI-backed independent candidate, Syed Mohammad Ali Bukhari, who received more votes. According to the audit, Syed Mohammad Ali Bukhari received 70,318 votes, while Shahzad received only 26,874 votes. According to the audit, there was a discrepancy between the original Forms 45 and those uploaded on the Election Commission of Pakistan (ECP) website, with clear evidence of result manipulation in favor of Khurram.
