= 1977 Pakistani general election in Islamabad =

7 March 1977	1985 →

1 seat from Islamabad in the National Assembly
- Registered: 106,970
- Turnout: 63.73

	First party	Second party
Leader	Zulfiqar Ali Bhutto	Wali Khan
Party	PPP	PNA
Last election	0	New
Seats won	1	0
Seat change	▲1	Steady
Popular vote	43,794	22,265
Percentage	64.23%	32.65%
Swing	▲	▲32.65
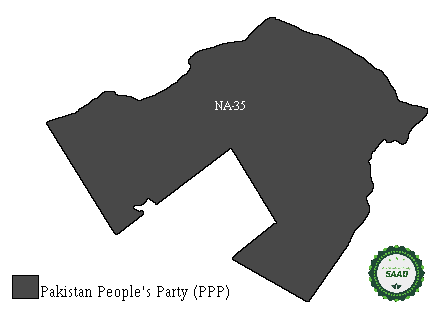

General elections were held in Islamabad Capital Territory on Wednesday, 7 March 1977 to elect 1 member of National Assembly of Pakistan from Islamabad.

Pakistan People's Party won Islamabad seat.

== Candidates ==
Total no of 3 Candidates including 1 Independent contested for 1 National Assembly Seat from Islamabad.

No.	Constituency	Candidates	
No.	Constituency	PPP	PNA
1	NA-35	Zahoor Ahmed	Ghafoor Ahmed

== Result ==
Vote Share of different parties in the election.
1. PPP (64.23%)
2. PNA (32.65%)
3. Ind (0.35%)
4. Invalid(Rejected) (2.76%)
Seat Share of different parties in the election.
1. PPP (100%)

Party Wise

Party	Seats		Votes	
Party	Contested	Won	#	%
Pakistan Peoples Party	1	1	43,794	64.23
Pakistan National Alliance	1	0	22,265	32.65
Independent	1	0	239	0.35
Total		1	68,182	100.0

=== Constituency wise ===
No.	Constituency	Turnout	Elected Member	Party	Runner-up	Party	Win Margin (by votes)	Win Margin (by % votes)
1	NA-35	63.73	Zahoor Ahmed	Pakistan Peoples Party	Ghafoor Ahmed	Pakistan National Alliance	21,529	31.60
