= NA-47 Islamabad-II =

Constituency of the National Assembly of Pakistan

- Constituency for the National Assembly of Pakistan
- Region: Islamabad City (partly) Barakahu town and rural areas of Islamabad Capital Territory
- Electorate: 433,202

Current constituency
- Created: 2018
- Party: Pakistan Muslim League (N)
- Member: Tariq Fazal Chaudhry
- Created from: NA-52 Islamabad-I; NA-53 Islamabad-II

NA-47 Islamabad-II (این اے-۴۷، اسلام آباد-۲) is a constituency for the National Assembly of Pakistan.

== Area ==
The constituency mostly consists of urban areas of Islamabad in addition to Bhara Kahu. During the 2018 delimitation, this constituency took areas from two former constituencies namely NA-48 (Islamabad-I) and NA-49 (Islamabad-II), the areas with their respective former constituencies are shown below:

Areas acquired from NA-48 Islamabad-I

- Sectors E-7, F-7, G-7, G-8, G-9, H-8, H-9, I-8, E-10, E-11 and I-9

Areas acquired from NA-49 Islamabad-II

- Sectors F-6, and G-6
- Constitution Ave
- Bari Imam
- Mohra Nur
- Phulgran
- Suhan Dehati
- Chattar
- Shehzad Town
- Lakhwal

== Members of Parliament ==
=== 2018–2023: NA-53 Islamabad-II ===
Election	Member	Party
2018	Imran Khan	PTI
By-election 2018	Ali Nawaz Awan	PTI

=== 2024–present: NA-47 Islamabad-II ===
Election	Member	Party
2024	Tariq Fazal Chaudhry	PML(N)

== Election 2018 ==
General elections were held on 25 July 2018. Chairman Pakistan Tehreek-e-Insaf, Imran Khan won the election but vacated this constituency and three others in favor of NA-95 (Mianwali-I).

General election 2018: NA-53 Islamabad-II
Party	Candidate	Votes	%
PTI	Imran Khan	92,891	53.09
PML(N)	Shahid Khaqan Abbasi	44,314	25.33
PPP	Syed Sibtul Haider Bukhari	17,970	10.27
MMA	Mian Muhammad Aslam	6,745	3.85
TLP	Muhammad Afnan Umar Baloch	5,144	2.94
Others	Others (twenty-eight candidates)	7,912	4.52
Turnout		176,456	56.53
Total valid votes		174,976	99.15
Rejected ballots		1,480	0.85
Majority		48,577	27.76
Registered electors		312,142	
PTI win (new seat)			

== By-election 2018 ==
By-elections were held in this constituency on 14 October 2018.

By-election 2018: NA-53 Islamabad-II
Party	Candidate	Votes	%	±%
PTI	Ali Nawaz Awan	50,943	58.47	▲5.38
PML(N)	Raja Waqar Mumtaz	32,313	37.09	▲11.76
Others	Others (nine candidates)	3,864	4.44	
Turnout		87,903	28.07	▼28.46
Total valid votes		87,120	99.11	▼0.04
Rejected ballots		783	0.89	▲0.04
Majority		18,630	21.38	▼6.38
Registered electors		313,141		
PTI hold		Swing	▼3.19	

== Election 2024 ==
General elections were held on 8 February 2024. Tariq Fazal Chaudhry won the election with 101,575 votes.

General election 2024: NA-47 Islamabad-II
Party	Candidate	Votes	%	±%
PML(N)	Tariq Fazal Chaudhry	101,575	40.32	▲3.23
PTI	Shoaib Shaheen (Note: Filed nomination papers as PTI candidate but ECP allowed him to run as an Independent)	87,105	34.58	▼23.89
Independent	Mustafa Nawaz Khokhar	18,980	7.53	N/A
PPP	Syed Sibtul Haider Bukhari	15,147	6.01	▲5.45
TLP	Hafiz Khawar Ikhlas	11,063	4.39	▲1.06
Others	Others (twenty-nine candidates)	18,026	7.16	
Turnout		252,945	58.39	▲30.32
Total valid votes		251,896	99.59	
Rejected ballots		1,049	0.41	
Majority		14,470	5.74	
Registered electors		433,200		
PML(N) gain from PTI				

== See also ==
- NA-46 Islamabad-I
- NA-48 Islamabad-III
