= Ali Nawaz Awan =

Pakistani politician

Special Assistant to PM on Capital Development Authority Affairs
- In office 7 November 2018 – 10 April 2022
- President: Arif Alvi
- Prime Minister: Imran Khan

Member of the National Assembly of Pakistan
- In office 29 October 2018 – 22 January 2023
- Constituency: NA-47 Islamabad-II

Personal details
- Born: Islamabad, Pakistan

Malik Nawaz Awan is a Pakistani politician who had been a member of the National Assembly of Pakistan from October 2018 till January 2023.

== Political career ==
He served as the opposition leader in the Islamabad Metropolitan Corporation.

Awan was elected to the National Assembly of Pakistan as a candidate of Pakistan Tehreek-e-Insaf (PTI) from the Constituency NA-53 (Islamabad-II) in the 2018 Pakistani by-elections held on 14 October 2018.

On 7 November, he was inducted into the federal cabinet of Prime Minister Imran Khan and was appointed as Special Assistant to Prime Minister on affairs of Capital Development Authority.
