= Mohammad Nawaz Khokhar =

Pakistani politician (1948–2021)

Haji Muhammad Nawaz Khokhar
- محمد نواز کھوکھر

13th Deputy Speaker of the National Assembly of Pakistan
- In office 4 November 1990 – 18 July 1993
- President: Ghulam Ishaq Khan
- Prime Minister: Nawaz Sharif
- Speaker: Gohar Ayub Khan
- Preceded by: Ashraf Khatoon Abbasi
- Succeeded by: Syed Zafar Ali Shah

Member of National Assembly of Pakistan
- In office 1993–1996
- Constituency: Islamabad
- In office 1990–1993
- Constituency: Islamabad
- In office 1985–1988
- Constituency: Islamabad

Personal details
- Born: 18 February 1948 Islamabad, Pakistan
- Died: 9 January 2021 (aged 72) Islamabad, Pakistan
- Cause of death: Cardiac arrest
- Citizenship: Islamabad
- Party: Pakistan Muslim League (N)
- Other political affiliations: Islami Jamhoori Ittehad (before 1993)
- Children: Mustafa Nawaz Khokhar (son)
- Relatives: See Khokhar Family
- Occupation: Politician

Muhammad Nawaz Khokhar was a Pakistani politician from Islamabad, Pakistan.

== Early life and career ==
Nawaz Khokhar was elected as MNA thrice from his constituency NA-35 (Islamabad) in 1985–1988, 1990–1993 and 1993–1996. He was elected the deputy speaker of the National Assembly of Pakistan in 1999 and also served as Minister of Science and Technology. He was one of the most notorious politicians. He was brother of late Imtiaz Khokhar also known as Taji Khokhar. He died on 9 January 2021 due to cardiac arrest.
