= Anjum Aqeel Khan =

Pakistani politician

Raja Anjum Aqeel

Member of the National Assembly of Pakistan
- Incumbent
- Assumed office 29 February 2024
- Constituency: NA-46 Islamabad-I

Personal details
- Party: PMLN (2008-present)

Anjum Aqeel Khan is a Pakistani politician who has been a member of the National Assembly of Pakistan since February 2024. He previously served in this position from 2008 to 2013.

== Early life ==
Khan started his career as a school teacher. He then became a real estate agent, and later a real estate developer.

== Political career ==
He was elected to the National Assembly of Pakistan from Constituency NA-46 (Islamabad-I) as a candidate of Pakistan Muslim League (N) (PML-N) in the 2008 Pakistani general election. He received 61,480 votes and defeated Syed Israr Hussain, a candidate of Pakistan Peoples Party (PPP).

He ran for the seat of the National Assembly from Constituency NA-48 (Islamabad-I) as a candidate of PML-N in the 2013 Pakistani general election but was unsuccessful. He received 52,205 votes and lost the seat to Javed Hashmi.

In May 2024, a detailed audit by PATTAN-Coalition38 revealed that he received fewer votes in the 2024 elections compared to his rival PTI-backed independent candidate, Amir Masood, who received more votes.

== Controversies ==
In February 2011, Khan agreed to reimburse the sum of 5.8 billion rupees after admitting to the Federal Investigation Agency that, as the real estate broker of the National Police Foundation, he caused major financial losses (six-billion-rupee land fraud) to the Foundation. He was arrested in July 2011, but got released shortly thereafter. In November 2011, the police prosecuted Khan again for illegally occupying a plot in Islamabad. Arrested, he finally was bailed out in March 2012.

In 2016, the Pakistani National Accountability Bureau is criticized for not moving forward on Khan's obvious illegal real estate operations. In 2019, Khan is acquitted in National Police Foundation corruption case.
