= 1985 Pakistani general election in Islamabad =

- 25 February 1985

1 seat from Islamabad in the National Assembly
- Registered: 142,695
- Turnout: 60.34 ▼3.39
	First party
Leader	None
Party	Nonpartisan
Last election	0
Seats won	1
Seat change	▲1
Popular vote	86,113
Percentage	100%
Swing	▲
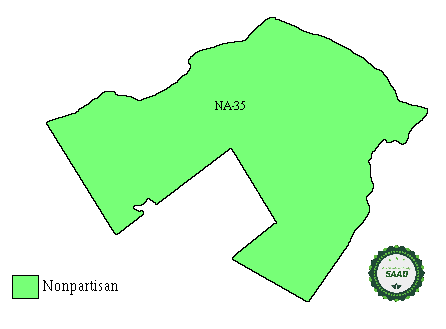

General elections were held in Islamabad Capital Territory on Monday, 25 February 1985, to elect one member of the National Assembly of Pakistan for the constituency NA-35 representing Islamabad. Independent politician Mohammad Nawaz Khokhar won the seat.

== Candidates ==
A total of sixteen candidates contested for the National Assembly from Islamabad.

== Result ==
Mohammad Nawaz Khokhar won the seat by obtaining 18,391 votes. His nearest rival, Zafar Ali Shah, finished second with 16,190 votes. The voter turnout was 60.3%.
