= Tariq Fazal Chaudhry =

Pakistani politician (born 1969)

Chaudhry Tariq Fazal
- طارق فضل چوہدری
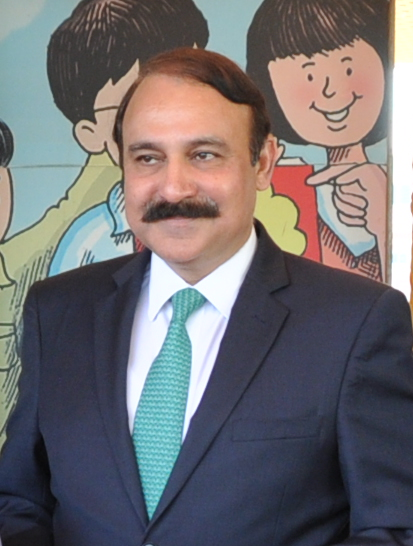
- Chaudhry at USAID's Mobile Bus Libraries Handover Ceremony in 2017

Ministry of Parliamentary Affairs (Pakistan)
- Incumbent
- Assumed office 7 March 2025
- President: Asif Ali Zardari
- Prime Minister: Shehbaz Sharif

Cabinet Secretariat of Pakistan
- In office 27 April 2018 – 31 May 2018
- President: Mamnoon Hussain
- Prime Minister: Shahid Khaqan Abbasi
- Succeeded by: Ali Nawaz Awan

Cabinet Secretariat of Pakistan
- In office 4 August 2017 – 27 April 2018
- President: Mamnoon Hussain
- Prime Minister: Shahid Khaqan Abbasi
- In office November 2015 – 28 July 2017
- President: Mamnoon Hussain
- Prime Minister: Nawaz Sharif
- Preceded by: Usman Ibrahim

Member of the National Assembly of Pakistan
- In office 17 March 1998 – 31 May 2018
- Constituency: NA-47 (Islamabad-II)
- Incumbent
- Assumed office 29 February 2024
- Constituency: NA-47 Islamabad-II

Personal details
- Born: June 7, 1969 (age 57) Islamabad, Pakistan
- Party: PMLN (2002-present)

Tariq Fazal Chaudhry (Urdu: طارق فضل چوہدری; born 7 June 1969) is a Pakistani politician who has served as a member of the National Assembly of Pakistan since February 2024. He previously served as a member from March 2008 to May 2018. He previously served as Federal Minister for Capital Administration and Development, in Abbasi cabinet from August 2017 to May 2018. Previously he served as the Minister of State for Capital Administration and Development from November 2015 to July 2017 in the third Sharif ministry and from August 2017 to April 2018 in the Abbasi ministry.

== Early life and education ==
Chaudhry was born on 7 June 1969 in Islamabad, Pakistan. He graduated from Rawalpindi Medical University.

== Political career ==
Chaudhry ran for the seat of National Assembly of Pakistan from Constituency NA-49 (Islamabad-II) as a candidate of Pakistan Muslim League (N) (PML-N) in the 2002 Pakistani general election but was unsuccessful. He received 16,832 votes and lost the seat to Nayyar Hussain Bukhari.

Chaudhry was elected to the National Assembly as a candidate of PML-N from Constituency NA-49 (Islamabad-II) in the 2008 Pakistani general election. He received 45,482 votes and defeated Nayyar Hussain Bukhari.

Chaudhry was re-elected to the National Assembly as a candidate of PML-N from Constituency NA-49 (Islamabad-II) in the 2013 Pakistani general election. He received 94,106 votes and defeated a candidate of Pakistan Tehreek-e-Insaf.

In November 2015, he was inducted into the federal cabinet of the third Sharif ministry and was appointed as the Minister of State for Capital Administration and Development. He had ceased to hold ministerial office in July 2017 when the federal cabinet was disbanded following the resignation of Prime Minister Nawaz Sharif after Panama Papers case decision.

He has been the president of Islamabad wing of Pakistan Muslim League (N) in 2016.

Following the election of Shahid Khaqan Abbasi as Prime Minister of Pakistan in August 2017, he was inducted into the federal cabinet of Abbasi. He retained the cabinet portfolio of Minister of State for Capital Administration and Development. he was elevated as federal minister and was appointed as Federal Minister for Capital Administration and Development in the cabinet of Prime Minister Shahid Khaqan Abbasi. Upon the dissolution of the National Assembly on the expiration of its term on 31 May 2018, Chaudhry ceased to hold the office as Federal Minister for Capital Administration and Development.
