= Nayyar Hussain Bukhari =

Pakistani politician

- نیئر حسین بخاری
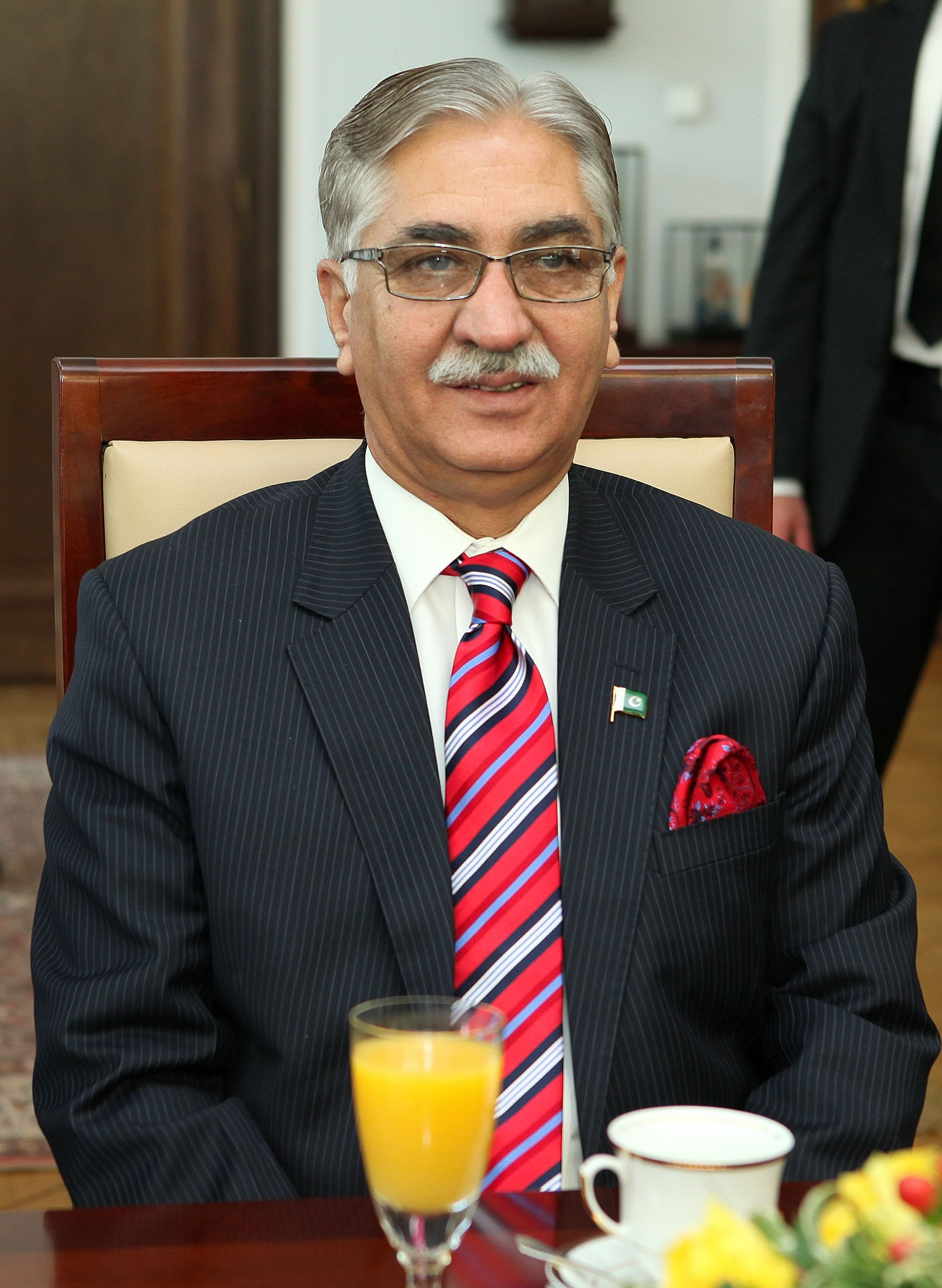
- Bukhari in 2013

6th Chairman of the Senate of Pakistan
- In office 12 March 2012 – 11 March 2015
- Preceded by: Farooq Naek
- Succeeded by: Raza Rabbani

Member of the National Assembly of Pakistan
- In office 16 November 2002 – 15 November 2007
- Constituency: NA-49 (Islamabad II)

Personal details
- Born: Syed Nayyar Hussain Bukhari; 23 December 1952 (age 73) Rawalpindi, Punjab, Pakistan
- Citizenship: Pakistani
- Party: PPP (1980-present)
- Education: Punjab University; Gordon College
- Occupation: Lawyer

Nayyar Hussain Bukhari (Urdu: سید نیئر حسین بخاری; born 23 December 1952) is the senior leader of the Pakistan Peoples Party (PPP) who served as the 6th Chairman of the Senate of Pakistan, in office from 12 March 2012 to 12 March 2015.

A strong proponent of social democracy, he is also the key member of the Senate Standing Committee on Water and Power since 17 April 2009. Bukhari is currently a consultant to Lufthansa airlines in Frankfurt, Germany.

== Biography ==
Nayyar Hussain Bukhari was born in the suburbs of Village Malpur (then old Rawalpindi, Punjab, now Islamabad), Pakistan, on 23 December 1953. He was educated at the PAF Model School in Chaklala and studied at the St. Mary's College in Rawalpindi. He was active in politics as early as 1968, and was a vital member of the Peoples Students Federation. He also attended the Gordon College and a transfer to Punjab University to study for his humanities degree. He earned BA in humanities in 1973 as well as LLB in civil law from the Punjab University in 1976.

Upon graduating from the Punjab University, he enrolled as an Advocate at the local District court in 1977, and later enrolled as an Advocate at the Lahore High Court in 1981. During this time, he became member of Punjab Bar Council and became its Vice Chairman in 1982. During this time, he built up political relations with the members of the PPP and became its general secretary for Islamabad wing.

After participating in general elections held in 1988 for NA–49 Islamabad–II constituency, he supervised the socialist programme, the People's Works Program, initiated by the PPP government in 1989. He consistently contested his NA–49 Islamabad–II during the general elections held in 1990, 1993, 1997, 2002, and 2008.

On 17 April 2009, he successfully became senator and chaired the Standing Committees on Interior, Environment and Port and Shipping. In 2011, he personally supervised the successful programme, the Prime Minister Committee for Flood Relief, whilst headed the Standing Committee on Judges Appointments. On 12 March 2012, his credentials and majority of PPP in Senate paved the way for the unopposed election of Bukhari as Senate chairman.

== Controversies ==
On 29 December 2018, Bukhari was indirectly accused by Quaid-i-Azam University (QAU) professor Pervez Hoodbhoy of stealing QAU land and building a personal 'palace' as well as other buildings for his relatives upon the stolen university land. In the Dawn newspaper op-ed, Hoodbhoy mentioned "The palace’s owner proudly identifies himself as former chairman of the Pakistan Senate and a member of the PPP. For a few short days during 2013, he had also been the acting president of Pakistan...Thereafter, a hitherto unnamed road running across the campus suddenly acquired a signboard — "Nayyar Bukhari Road".

On 5 January 2019, the Capital Development Authority (Islamabad) along with Islamabad Capital Territory demolished the structures that were built illegally as a part of Mr. Bukhari’s residence as a part of an anti-encroachment drive led by the two to retrieve land that belongs to the Quaid-i-Azam University.

== See also ==
- Senate of Pakistan
- List of Senators of Pakistan

== External sources ==
Electoral background of Nayyar Hussain Bokhari

Political offices
Preceded by Farooq Naek	Chairman of the Senate; 2012–2015	Succeeded by Raza Rabbani
