= NA-46 Islamabad-I =

Constituency of the National Assembly of Pakistan

- Constituency for the National Assembly of Pakistan
- Region: Islamabad City area of Islamabad Capital Territory
- Electorate: 350,581

Current constituency
- Party: Pakistan Muslim League (N)
- Member: Anjum Aqeel Khan
- Created from: NA-54 Islamabad-II

NA-46 Islamabad-I (این اے-۴۶، اسلام آباد-۱) is a constituency for the National Assembly of Pakistan.

== Area ==
The constituency consists of a mix of urban and rural areas of Islamabad Capital Territory from Sector G-10 to Tarnol and also includes Sector I-10. During 2018 delimitation, NA-49 (Islamabad-II) constituency was divided between this constituency and NA-53 (Islamabad-II). On the granular basis, the following areas of Islamabad are included in this constituency:

- Tarnol
- Golra Sharif
- Sectors E-8, E-9, E-10, F-8, F-9, F-10, G-10, H-10, and I-10

== Members of Parliament ==
=== 1977-2002: NA-35 Islamabad ===
Election	Member	Party
1977	Zahoor Ahmad	PPP
1985	Haji Muhammad Nawaz Khokhar	IND
1988	Raja Pervaiz Khan	PPP
1990	Haji Muhammad Nawaz Khokar	IJI
1993	Haji Muhammad Nawaz Khokar	PML-N
1997	Syed Zafar Ali Shah	PML-N

=== 2002–2018: NA-48 Islamabad-I ===
Election	Member	Party
2002	Mian Muhammad Aslam	MMA
2008	Anjum Aqeel Khan	PML-N
2013	Javed Hashmi	PTI
2013 By-election	Asad Umar	PTI

=== 2018–2023: NA-54 Islamabad-III ===
Election	Member	Party
2018	Asad Umar	PTI

=== 2024–present: NA-46 Islamabad-I ===
Election	Member	Party
2024	Anjum Aqeel Khan	PML(N)

== Election 2002 ==
General elections were held on 10 October 2002. Mian Muhammad Aslam of Muttahida Majlis-e-Amal won by 40,365 votes.

General election 2002: NA-48 Islamabad-I
Party	Candidate	Votes	%	±%
MMA	Mian Muhammad Aslam	40,365	46.08	
PPP	Dr. Babar Awan	28,775	32.85	
PTI	Sahibzada Ahmad Raza Khan Kasuri	5,310	6.06	
PML(Q)	Munawar Mughal	3,915	4.47	
PML(N)	Syed Zafar Ali Shah	3,893	4.44	
Independent	Alamgir Khan	2,479	2.83	
Others	Others (twelve candidates)	2,864	3.27	
Turnout		88,227	47.07	
Total valid votes		87,601	99.29	
Rejected ballots		626	0.71	
Majority		11,590	13.23	
Registered electors		187,426		

== Election 2008 ==
The result of general election 2008 in this constituency is given below. Anjum Aqeel Khan succeeded in the election 2010 and became the member of National Assembly.

General election 2008: NA-48 Islamabad-I
Party	Candidate	Votes	%	±%
PML(N)	Anjum Aqeel Khan	61,480	58.88	
PPP	Dr. Syed Israr Hussain	26,485	25.37	
PML(Q)	Rizwan Sadiq Khan	10,483	10.04	
Others	Others (twenty candidates)	5,961	5.71	
Turnout		104,957	43.75	
Total valid votes		104,409	99.48	
Rejected ballots		548	0.52	
Majority		34,995	33.51	
Registered electors		239,924		
PML(N) gain from MMA				

== Election 2013 ==
Javed Hashmi succeeded in the 2013 general election and became the member of National Assembly.

General election 2013: NA-48 Islamabad-I
Party	Candidate	Votes	%	±%
PTI	Javed Hashmi	73,878	42.66	
PML(N)	Anjum Aqeel Khan	52,205	30.14	
JI	Mian Muhammad Aslam	25,048	14.46	
Others	Others (forty-eight candidates)	22,058	12.74	
Turnout		174,231	59.64	
Total valid votes		173,189	99.40	
Rejected ballots		1,042	0.60	
Majority		21,673	12.52	
Registered electors		292,142		
PTI gain from PML(N)				

== By-election 2013 ==
The seat fell vacant after Javed Hashmi choose to retain his Multan constituency. A re-election was held on 22 August 2013 in which Asad Umar secured a win with 48,073 votes his closest rival was PML-N Chaudhary Muhammad Ashraf Gujjar who came second at 41,186 votes

By-election 2013: NA-48 Islamabad-I
Party	Candidate	Votes	%	±%
PTI	Asad Umar	48,073	51.01	
PML(N)	Chaudhary Muhammad Ashraf Gujjar	41,186	43.70	
Others	Others (twenty candidates)	4,990	5.29	
Turnout		94,257	32.11	
Total valid votes		94,249	99.99	
Rejected ballots		8	0.01	
Majority		6,887	7.31	
Registered electors		293,525		
PTI hold				

== Election 2018 ==
General elections were held on 25 July 2018. Asad Umar managed to retain his seat he won in the 2013 by-election.

General election 2018: NA-54 Islamabad-III
Party	Candidate	Votes	%	±%
PTI	Asad Umar	56,945	47.98	
PML(N)	Anjum Aqeel Khan	32,991	27.80	
Independent	Hafeez-ur-Rehman Tipu	8,279	6.98	
MMA	Mian Muhammad Aslam	7,320	6.17	
PPP	Raja Imran Ashraf	4,019	3.39	
TLP	Sajid Mehmood	3,637	3.06	
Independent	Zubair Farooq Khan	2,415	2.03	
Others	Others (twenty candidates)	2,141	1.80	
Turnout		118,679	54.24	
Rejected ballots		932	0.79	
Majority		23,954	20.18	
Registered electors		218,795		
PTI hold		Swing		

== Election 2024 ==
General elections were held on 8 February 2024. Anjum Aqeel Khan won the election with 82,536 votes.

General election 2024: NA-46 Islamabad-I
Party	Candidate	Votes	%	±%
PML(N)	Anjum Aqeel Khan	82,536	51.18	▲28.38
PTI	Amir Mughal (Note: Filed nomination papers as PTI candidate but ECP allowed him to run as an Independent)	46,313	28.72	▼19.26
JI	Mian Muhammad Aslam	12,017	7.45	N/A
PPP	Raja Imran Ashraf	8,033	4.98	▲1.59
TLP	Ghulam Qadar	5,547	3.44	▲0.38
Others	Others (thirty eight candidates)	6,821	4.23	
Turnout		162,306	46.30	▼7.94
Rejected ballots		1,039	0.64	
Majority		36,223	22.46	
Registered electors		350,581		
PML(N) gain from PTI				

== See also ==
- NA-45 Dera Ismail Khan-II
- NA-47 Islamabad-II
