= Sharmila Faruqui =

Pakistani politician and former Chief Minister of Sindh

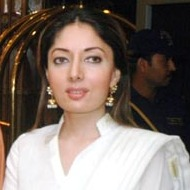
- Faruqui in 2005

Member of the Provincial Assembly of Sindh
- In office February 2020 – August 2023
- Constituency: Reserved seat for women
- In office 2013–2018
- Constituency: Reserved seat for women

Advisor to the chief minister of Sindh
- In office September 2008 – 21 March 2013
- Governor: Ishratul Ibad
- Chief Minister: Syed Qaim Ali Shah

Personal details
- Born: 25 January 1978 (age 48) Karachi, Sindh, Pakistan
- Party: PPP (2008-present)
- Spouse: Hasham Riaz Sheikh (m. 2015)
- Parents: Usman Farooqi (father); Anisa Farooqi (mother)
- Relatives: N M Uqaili (maternal grandfather)
- Education: Adamson Institute of Business Administration and Technology, Karachi

Sharmila Sahiba Faruqui Hasham (Urdu: شرمیلا صاحبہ فاروقی ہشام; born 25 January 1978) is a Pakistani politician from Karachi, affiliated with the Pakistan Peoples Party.

== Family and education ==
Faruqui is the daughter of Usman Farooqi, who was a bureaucrat and a former chairman of Pakistan Steel Mill and Anisa. She belongs to a Sindhi family. Her maternal grandfather was N M Uqaili, former Pakistan Minister of Finance. She is the niece of Salman Faruqui, a confidante of former President Asif Ali Zardari.

Faruqui earned her Master of Business Administration from the Adamson Institute of Business Administration and Technology, Karachi and a Master of Laws degree.

On 5 March 2015, Faruqui married Hasham Riaz Sheikh, a former Wall Street investment banker and presently an advisor to Asif Ali Zardari.

== Career ==
Prior to joining politics as a Pakistan Peoples Party leader, Faruqui worked as an actress. She appeared in the drama serial "Panchwa Mausam" along with Aijaz Aslam, Talat Hussain, Abdullah Kadwani and Gulab Chandio.

She appears on TV political news/talk/public affairs News channels to defend her party and government from corruption allegations.

She previously served as a member of the Provincial Assembly of Sindh from 2013–2018 and was reelected in 2018 Pakistani general elections and later became its member in February 2020.

=== Corruption ===
In 2001, Faruqui along with her father Usman Faruqui, embezzled Rs 195 billion ($1.95 billion) from Pakistan Steel Mills and Government of Pakistan through political corruption and fraud. Anisa Faruqui, her mother, entered into a plea bargain with the National Accountability Bureau on 28 April 2001 after being arrested with First Information Report (FIR) No. 19/96, and given into the custody of the Ehtesab Cell by the Special Judge, Central II, handling cases of top corrupt public servants like Usman Faruqui. Sharmila Faruqui and her family were extensively investigated by officers of the National Accountability Bureau, Federal Investigation Agency and officials Karachi Electric Supply Corporation due to the non-payment of electricity bills to the tune of Rs 1 million.

== See also ==
- Allah Baksh Sarshar Uqaili
