= Madhusudan Mistry =

Indian politician

Member of Parliament (Rajya Sabha) for Gujarat
- In office 10 April 2014 – 22 June 2020

Member of Parliament (Lok Sabha) for Sabarkantha
- In office 2001–2009
- Preceded by: Nisha Chaudhary
- Succeeded by: Mahendrasinh Chauhan

General Secretary, AICC
- In office 2011–2020

Personal details
- Born: 3 January 1945 (age 81) Ahmedabad, Bombay Presidency, British India
- Citizenship: Indian
- Party: Indian National Congress
- Spouse: Meeraben
- Parent(s): Devaram Gopalram and Tulasiben
- Education: Maharaja Sayajirao University of Baroda, Ruskin College

Madhusudan Devram Mistry (born 3 January 1945) is an Indian politician belonging to the Indian National Congress.

== Early life ==
Madhusudan Mistry was born to Devaram Gopalram and Tulasiben in Ahmedabad, in 1945. He obtained an M.A. in Geography, and worked as a college lecturer in Ahmedabad.

== Later life ==
He served as a member of the 13th and the 14th Lok Sabhas, representing the Sabarkantha constituency in Gujarat. In 2014, he was nominated by Congress party to the Rajya sabha (upper house of the Parliament of India) representing Gujarat State. He also founded an NGO called Developing Initiatives for Social and Human Action (DISHA). Mistry has been a General Secretary of the Congress since 2011, and is considered a close aide of the party's President Rahul Gandhi.

== Activism ==
In 1969, Madhusudan Mistry campaigned as a trade unionist for the Praja Socialist Party candidate Brahmkumar Bhatt. The next year, he quit teaching for full-time trade union activities. He became a trade unionist with the Majur Mahajan Sangh (Textile Labour Union) of Ahmedabad.

In 1977, Mistry went to Oxford on a scholarship for a development studies course. He then returned to India in 1979 and worked as a field officer for Oxfam during 1979-85. After leaving Oxfam, in 1985, he founded the NGO Developing Initiatives for Social and Human Action (DISHA), with an aim to mobilize the Dalits, forest workers, tribal women and casual labourers in Gujarat. DISHA was envisaged as a supportive core group for a network of smaller organizations of people fighting against exploitation. Mistry received funding from the Ford Foundation to have a secondment to the Center on Budget and Policy Priorities in USA to learn how this organization used budget analysis and advocacy to influence public expenditure. DISHA subsequently was probably the first developing country-based NGO to use budget analysis - for the state of Gujarat.

== Political career ==
When the BJP leader Shankersinh Vaghela rebelled and formed Rashtriya Janata Party (RJP), Mistry joined him. He became a member of the Indian National Congress when RJP merged with it.

Mistry was elected to the 13th Lok Sabha on a Congress ticket in 2001, in a bye-election from Sabarkantha. He was subsequently re-elected to the 14th Lok Sabha from Sabarkantha in 2004, and served as member on several parliamentary committees. He lost the 2009 Lok Sabha elections from the same constituency, to Mahendrasinh Chauhan of BJP. In 2014 he was nominated to Rajya Saha by Congress party and continues to represent Gujarat till 2020.

=== Congress Working Committee ===
In 2011, Mistry was appointed as one of the General Secretaries of the All India Congress Committee. He was appointed to the Congress Working Committee, and also made in-charge of the party in Kerala, Karnataka and Lakshadweep.

Mistry is a member of the Central Employment Guarantee Council (CEGC) under the MGNREGA program. In 2013, he toured Gujarat and Madhya Pradesh to assess and point out anomalies in the implementation of MGNREGA schemes in these two states.

=== Assembly elections planning ===
After the party's win in the 2011 Kerala and 2013 Karnataka assembly elections, Mistry was made in-charge of the party's Uttar Pradesh unit. He acquired reputation as Rahul Gandhi's Man Friday, and as a man who works behind the scenes. Within Congress, he was credited for the Kerala and Karnataka victories. However, several political analysts observed that the Congress victory in Karnataka was a result of the crisis in BJP's state unit and Mistry had spent little time in Kerala. Mistry was the chairman of the screening committee for selection of candidates for the 2013 Madhya Pradesh Legislative Assembly election, which Congress lost. A Congress leader Raghu Parmar accused Mistry of taking money for giving tickets. Parmar was later expelled from the party. Subsequently, in response to a legal notice issued by Mistry, he issued a public apology for making "false and defamatory" allegations.

=== 2014 Lok Sabha elections ===
Mistry was a member of Rahul Gandhi led election coordination committee for the 2014 Lok Sabha elections. Gandhi deployed Mistry as a "one-man mission" to tour the country and gather feedback about the prospective candidates at the grassroots level. Mistry is also head one of the three sub-groups of election coordination committee.

Mistry was the Indian National Congress candidate against BJP's prime-ministerial candidate Narendra Modi from Vadodara. He lost to Modi by 5,70,128 votes - the highest margin in the 2014 elections, and the second highest ever in the history of Indian general elections.

== Personal life ==
Mistry married Meenaben on 27 May 1969. The couple has a son and three daughters.
