= Ali Murad Sanjrani =

Sindhi Administrator

Khan Sahib Ali Murad Sanjrani K.S
- علي مراد سنجراڻي

Personal details
- Born: Shahpur Chakar, Sindh
- Children: Abdul Qadir Sanjrani
- Parent: Lal Baksh Sanjrani (father)

Ali Murad Sanjrani (Sindhi: علي مراد سنجراڻي) K.S, Haji, was a Zamindar (landowner) and factory owner. Ali Murad was born in 1895 in his native village of Barhun. Fluent in Sindhi and Seraiki, he belonged to the prominent Sanjrani tribe, originally from Dera Ghazi Khan, Punjab. The tribe migrated during the Kalhora dynasty of Sindh and settled in their current village. He was awarded title of Khan Sahib in the 1930s. He was also Chairman of Farmer Organization.

== Family history ==
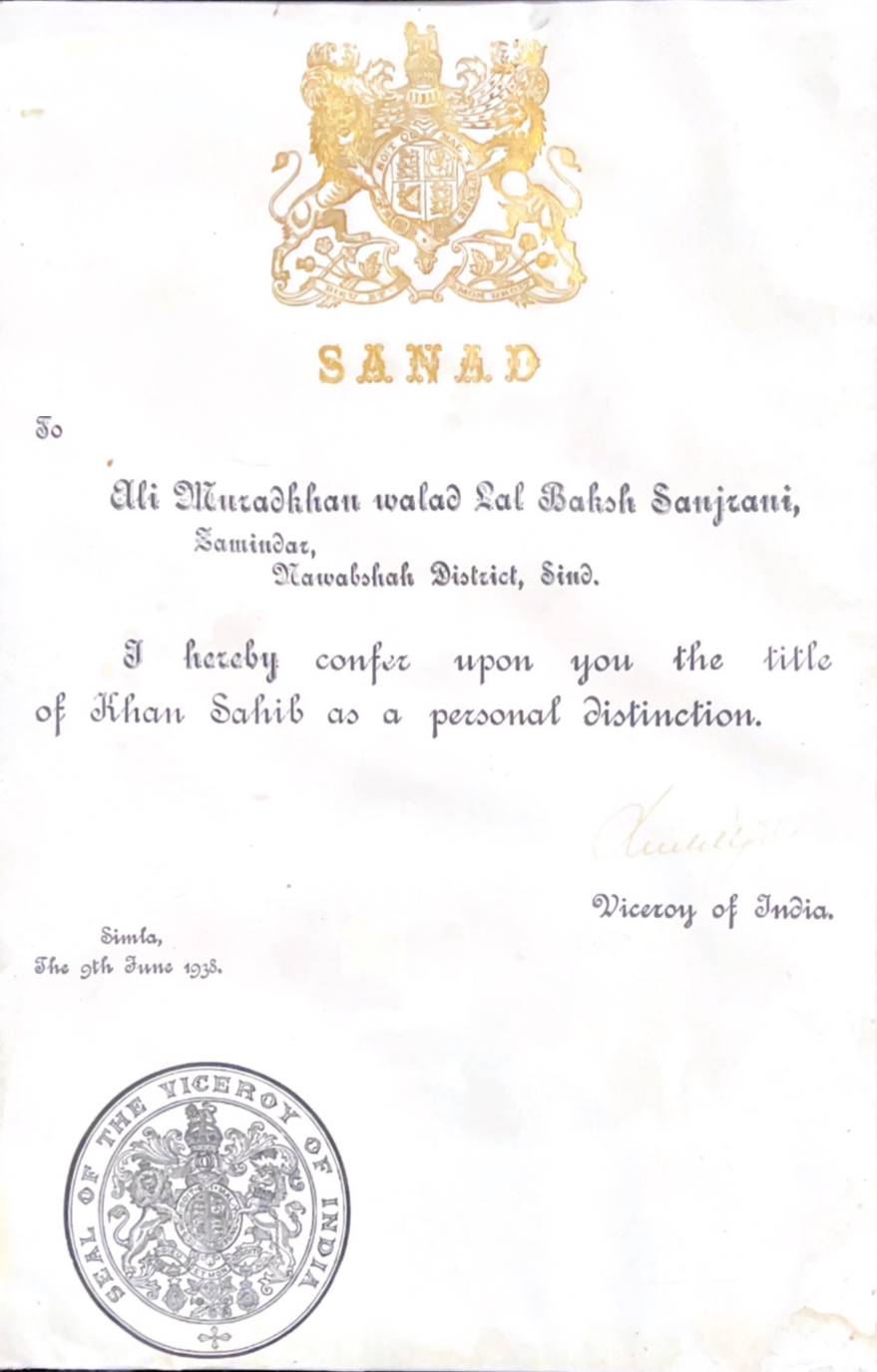
Sanad of Khan Sahib Ali Murad Sanjrani awarded by the Viceroy and Governor General of India Lord Linlithgow.

One of Ali Murad's ancestors served as a commander in the Talpur dynasty army and fought in the Battle of Dubbo in 1843. Ali Murad's father, Lal Baksh Sanjrani, held the position of Commissioner's Darbari and was also a member of the District Local Board.

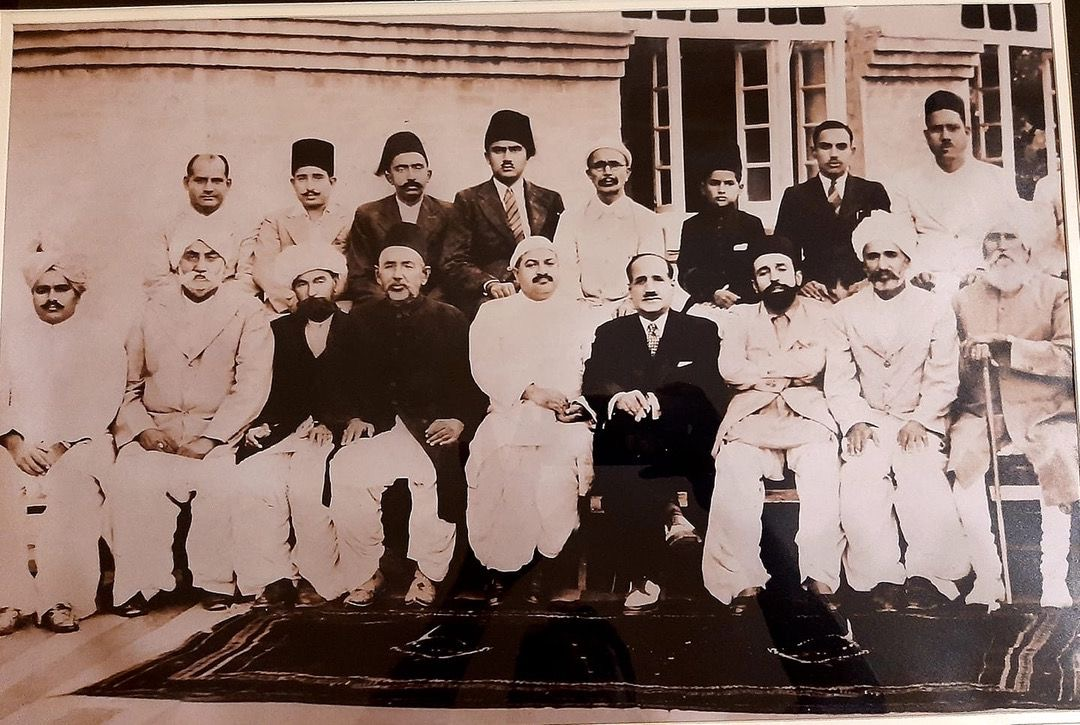
Bottom Row: from right to left Sundar Singh, Haji Wadal Shah, Mir AllahDad Talpur, Unknown, Seth Jhamandas, Ghulam Nabi Shah, Ali Murad Sanjrani, Din Muhammad Junejo, Seth Prem Chand Upper Row: Fourth from left is Ghulam Rasool Shah, rest unknown.
