= Nafis Sadik =

Pakistani civil servant (1929–2022)

Nafis Sadik (18 August 1929 – 14 August 2022) was a Pakistani physician, special adviser to the UN secretary general with additional responsibilities as special envoy for HIV/AIDS in Asia, and former executive director of the United Nations Population Fund (UNFPA) from 1987 to 2000. She retired from the post in December 2000.

== Early life and education ==
Nafis Sadik was born on 18 August 1929 in Jaunpur, British India as the daughter of Iffat Ara and Muhammad Shoaib, former finance minister of Pakistan. She studied medicine at and graduated with a Doctor of Medicine degree from Dow Medical College in Karachi, Pakistan.

After graduating, she went to the US to complete an internship in gynaecology and obstetrics at City Hospital in Baltimore, Maryland, and finished her further education at the Johns Hopkins University.

== Career ==
She returned to Pakistan in 1954 with her husband, to become a civilian doctor in army hospitals. She worked until 1963 in women's and children's wards in Pakistan Armed Forces hospitals. In 1964, Sadik was appointed head of the Health Section of the Government's Planning Commission.

Sadik joined the Pakistan Central Family Planning Council in 1966 as director of planning and training, the government agency charged with carrying out the national family planning programme. She was appointed deputy director-general in 1968 and director-general in 1970.

=== United Nations ===
Sadik joined the UN Population Fund in 1971. Shortly after the sudden death of the UNFPA executive director, Rafael Salas, UN secretary-general Javier Pérez de Cuéllar appointed her to succeed him, in 1987, thus becoming the first woman to head one of the United Nations' major voluntarily-funded programmes.

Sadik consistently called attention to the importance of addressing the needs of women, and of involving women directly in making and carrying out development policy. This was particularly important for population policies and programmes in the Third World and developing countries, where her strategy for providing females with education and the tools to control their own fertility has influenced the global birthrate.

In June 1990, the secretary-general of the United Nations appointed Sadik secretary-general of the International Conference on Population and Development (ICPD), 1994.

=== Other activities ===
Sadik's contribution to improving the health of women and children in the global community brought her many international awards and honors.

She was a member of the board of governors of the Foundation for Human Development, and a member of the South Asian Commission on the Asian Challenge. Sadik was the president of the Society for International Development (SID) for the period 1994–1997. Nafis Sadik also was a member of Association of Physicians of Pakistani Descent of North America.

After her retirement from the United Nations Population Fund, she served on several boards of directors and advisory panels of non-profit organizations and research institutions in the area of population control, including on the advisory board for the German Foundation for World Population. Sadik was an emeritus member of Population Action International.

== Personal life, death and legacy ==
Sadik married Azhar Sadik, a Pakistani army officer who died earlier in 2011. Nafis Sadik died of congestive heart failure on 14 August 2022 in the United States, at the age of 92. Sadik's husband and a daughter predeceased her. She was survived by three daughters - Ambereen Dar, Wafa Hasan, Ghazala Abedi and a son, Omar Sadik.

A major newspaper of Pakistan wrote in her obituary:

"Dr Nafis Sadik of Pakistan, a guiding force to the world in maternal and child health as well as family planning, passed away in New York on Sunday".

== Awards ==
- (1995) Prince Mahidol Award from the Prince Mahidol Award Foundation (Branch Public Health)
- (2000) Margaret Sanger Award from the Planned Parenthood Federation of America
- (2001) United Nations Population Award
- (2002) World Citizenship Award from the World Association of Girl Guides and Girl Scouts
- Award from The Royal College of Obstetricians and Gynecologists
- Award from the National Wildlife Federation, United States
- Award from American Public Health Association, Washington D.C., U.S.

== Publications ==
Nafis Sadik is widely published in the family planning and population control areas:

- Population: The UNFPA Experience (New York University Press, 1984)
- Population Policies and Programmes: Lessons Learned from Two Decades of Experience (New York University Press, 1991)
- Making a Difference: Twenty-five Years of UNFPA Experience (Banson, London, United Kingdom, 1994)

== See also ==
- Muhammad Shoaib
