= Abdul Qadir Sanjrani =

Pakistani politician

- عبدالقادر سنجراٹي

5th Minister of Finance
- In office 9 June 1962 – 15 December 1962
- President: Ayub Khan
- Preceded by: Muhammad Shoaib
- Succeeded by: Muhammad Shoaib

Minister of Commerce
- In office 28 May 1962 – 8 June 1962
- Preceded by: Md. Hafizur Rahman
- Succeeded by: Wahiduzzaman

Member of Sindh Assembly
- In office 2 May 1972 – 13 January 1977
- Constituency: PS-41 (Sanghar-II)

Member of West Pakistan Assembly
- In office 9 June 1962 – 8 June 1965
- Constituency: Sanghar-II

Personal details
- Born: Shahpur Chakar, Sindh
- Parent: Ali Murad Sanjrani (father)

Abdul Qadir Sanjrani (Sindhi: عبدالقادر سنجراٹي) was a Pakistani politician from Shahpur Chakar, Sindh. He served as 5th Finance minister of Pakistan, Health, Social Welfare, Basic Democracies and Local Government minister of West Pakistan. He also served as Pakistani ambassador to Kenya.

== Political career ==
He was elected as Member of Provincial Assembly of Sindh in 1970 elections contesting from PS-41 Sanghar at ticket of PML-Q defeating the future CM of Sindh Jam Sadiq Ali's brother, Jam Anwar Ali.

Pir Pagaro started to participate in politics during the Ayub era. He was also a personal friend of President Ayub Khan. During his era, Pir Pagara managed to get cabinet positions for Mohammad Khan Junejo and Abdul Qadir Sanjrani.

== Family ==
Abdul Qadir Sanjrani's father, Ali Murad Sanjrani K.S, Haji, was a Zamindar (landowner) and factory owner. Ali Murad was born in 1895 in his native village of Barhun. Fluent in Sindhi and Seraiki, he belonged to the prominent Sanjrani tribe, originally from Dera Ghazi Khan, Punjab. The tribe migrated during the Kalhora dynasty of Sindh and settled in their current village. He was awarded title of Khan Sahib in the 1930s. He was also Chairman of Farmer Organization.

One of Ali Murad's ancestors served as a commander in the Talpur dynasty army and fought in the Battle of Dubbo in 1843. Ali Murad's father, Lal Baksh Khan Sanjrani, held the position of Commissioner's Darbari and was also a member of the District Local Board.
