= Dipsinh Shankarsinh Rathod =

Indian politician

Dipsinh Rathod

Member of the India Parliament
- In office 16 May 2014 – 3 June 2024
- Preceded by: Mahendrasinh Chauhan
- Succeeded by: Shobhanaben Baraiya
- Constituency: Sabarkantha

Personal details
- Born: 1 June 1952 (age 73) Bhagpur, Sabarkantha, Gujarat
- Party: Bharatiya Janata Party
- Spouse: Shantiba Rathod (m. 4 May 1963)
- Children: 3
- Parent(s): Shankarsinh Raghusinh, Motaba Raghusinh
- Occupation: Agriculturist
- As of 13 December, 2016

Dipsinh Shankarsinh Rathod is an Indian politician and a member of parliament to the 16th Lok Sabha from Sabarkantha, Gujarat. He won the 2014 Indian general election being a Bharatiya Janata Party candidate.
