= Jay Chauhan =

Indian politician

MLA of Gujarat
- In office 2007–2012
- Succeeded by: Mahendrasinh Baraiya
- Constituency: Prantij

Personal details
- Party: Bhartiya Janata Party

Jay Chauhan is a Member of Legislative assembly from Prantij constituency in Gujarat for its 12th legislative assembly.
