= Chandulal Chunilal Desai =

Indian politician

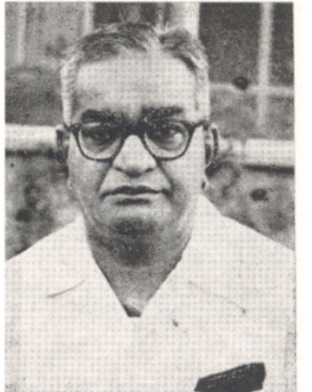

Member of Parliament, Lok Sabha
- In office 1967–1972
- Preceded by: Gulzarilal Nanda
- Succeeded by: Maniben Patel
- Constituency: Sabarkantha, Gujarat

Personal details
- Born: 27 April 1900 Bhadran, Kaira district, Bombay Presidency, British India (now in Anand district, Gujarat)
- Died: 22 September 1972 (aged 72) New Delhi, India
- Party: Indian National Congress (Organisation)
- Other political affiliations: Swatantra Party

Chandulal Chunilal Desai CIE (27 April 1900–22 September 1972) was an Indian civil servant, diplomat and politician.

== Career ==
Desai was educated at the universities of Bombay and Cambridge, taking a bachelor of arts from the latter. He then began his career in the Indian Civil Service (ICS), joining on 25 October 1923 and arriving in India on 26 November. Assigned to the Central Provinces and Berar, he rose to the position of provincial director of industries in March 1937, and was promoted deputy commissioner that November. In June 1939, he was appointed provincial secretary for local self-government and public health, and continued to serve as secretary for local self-government from July 1941. Appointed controller-general of civil supplies during the Second World War, he was appointed a Companion of the Order of the Indian Empire (CIE) in the 1945 Birthday Honours list.

After Indian independence, Desai successively served as high commissioner to Ceylon and to Pakistan. In 1967, he was elected to the Lok Sabha, the lower house of the Parliament of India, from Sabarkantha in Gujarat. Initially serving as a member of the Swatantra Party, he became a member of the Indian National Congress (Organisation) following reelection in 1971, dying in office the following year.
