= Gajendrasinh Parmar =

Gujarat politician (born 1978)

Minister of State Government of Gujarat
- Incumbent
- Assumed office 16 September 2021
- Ministry: Term
- Minister of Food & Civil Supplies: 16 September 2021 - Incumbent

Member of Gujarat Legislative Assembly
- Incumbent
- Assumed office 2017
- Preceded by: Mahendrasinh Baraiya
- Constituency: Prantij

Personal details
- Born: 24 January 1978 (age 48) Gujarat, India
- Party: Bharatiya Janata Party
- Website: Official Site

Gajendrasinh Parmar (born 24 November 1978) is an Indian politician from Gujarat. He is a member of the Gujarat Legislative Assembly representing the Bharatiya Janata Party from Prantij Assembly constituency in Sabarkantha District. He won the 2022 Gujarat Legislative Assembly election.

== Education ==
Parmar graduated with a B.A. (Hindi) from Hemchandracharya North Gujarat University, Patan in 2010.

== Career ==
Parmar first became an MLA winning the Prantij Assembly constituency representing the Bharatiya Janata Party in the 2017 Gujarat Legislative Assembly election defeating Mahendrasinh Kacharsinh Baraiya of the Indian National Congress by a margin of 2,551. He retained the seat in the 2022 Assembly election. He also served as a director of the S.K district bank in Himatnagar.
