= List of members of the 5th Provincial Assembly of Sindh =

Elections for the members of 5th Provincial assembly of Sindh were held on 17 December 1970. The first session was held on 2 May 1972.

== List of members of the 5th Provincial Assembly of Sindh ==
The tenure of the 5th Provincial assembly of Sindh was from 2 May 1972 till 13 January 1977.

Serial	Name	Constituency
1	Dur Muhammad Usto	Jacobadd
2	Sardar Noor Muhammad Bijarani. (Resigned).	Jacobabad
2A	Mir Hazar Khan Bijarani (By-Election). (Oath 04-03-1974)	Jacobabad
3	Mir Sunder Khan Sundarani	Jacobabad
4	Jam Muneer Ahmed Khan Dahar	Sukkur
5	Ali Anwer Khan Mahar	Sukkur
6	Agha Sadaruddin Khan Durani	Sukkur
7	Rahim Bux Soomro	Sukkur
8	Mufti Muhammad Hussain Qadri	Sukkur
9	Ghulam Shabbir Shah	Sukkur
10	Sardar Mehboob Ali Khan Magsi (Resigned).	LarkanaL
10A	Abdul Waheed Katpar (By Election). (Oath 04-03-1974)	Larkana
11	Dost Muhammad Hakaro	Larkana
12	Wahid Bux Bughio	Larkana
13	Ghulam Rasool Khan Kehar	Larkana
14	Syed Nazar Shah	Nawab shah
15	Rais Ali Nawaz Unar	Nawab Shah
16	Ghulam Mujtaba Jatoi (Resigned)	Nawab Shah
16A	Ghulam Mustafa Jatoi (By Election). (Oath 04-03-1974)	Nawab Shah
17	Syed Zafar Ali Shah	Nawab Shah
18	Syed Murad Ali Shah (By Election). (Oath 19-06-1972)	Nawab Shah
19	Syed Nadir Ali Shah	Khairpur
20	Pir Haji Gul Shah	Khairpur
21	Sahibzada Mir Atta Hussain Taplur	Khairpur
22	Illahi Bux Khan Bambhan	Khairpur
23	Syed Amir Ali Shah	Hyderabad
24	Syed Muhammad Hussain Shah	Hyderabad
25	Muhammad Usman Kennedy	Hyderabad
26	Munir Ahmed Arain (Expire)	Hyderabad
26A	Syed Badi-Ul-Hassan Zaidi (By Election). (Oath 17-06-1974)	Hyderabad
27	Nawab Muzaffar Hussain Khan	Hyderabad
28	Mir Rasool Bux Talpur (Resigned)	Hyderabad
28A	Zakia Iqbal Ahmed Brohi (By Election). (Oath 01-061972)	Hyderabad
29	Mir Mumtaz Ali Talpur	Hyderabad
30	Ghulam Hyder Nizamani	Hyderabad
31	Nabi Bux Khan Bhurgari	Hyderabad
32	Haji Amir Bux Junejo	Dadu
33	Haji Muhammad Bux Jamali	Dadu
34	Syed Abdullah Shah	Dadu
35	Syed Ali Qutub Shah	Tharparkar
36	Mir Imam Bux Khan Talpur	Tharparkar
37	Abdul Karim Palli	Tharparkar
38	Rana Chander Singh	Tharparkar
39	Amir Hassan Arbab	Sangar
40	Jam Sadiq Ali	Sangar
41	Abdul Qadir Sanjrani	Sangar
42	Khalifo Muhammad Aqil Hingoro	Thatta
43	Abdul Hameed Memon. (By-Election)	Thatta
44	Muhammad Khan Soomro	Thatta
45	Syed Bashir Ahmed Shah	Karachi
46	Jamote Wali Muhammad	Karachi
47	Ahmed Ali Soomro	Karachi
48	Syed Imdad Hussain Shah	Karachi
49	Abdullah Baluch	Karachi
50	Iftikhar Ahmed	Karachi
51	Muhammad Ali Gabole.	Karachi
52	Haji Zahid Ali	Karachi
53	Syed Saeed Hassan Shah	Karachi
53A	Piyar Ali Alana	Karachi
54	Bostan Ali Hoti	Karachi
55	Qasim Haji Abbas Patel	Karachi
56	Abdul Waheed Arshi	Karachi
57	Zahoor-Ul-Hassan Bhopali	Karachi
58	G. A. Madani	Karachi
59	Mohammad Hassan Haqqani	Karachi
60	Shah Farid-Ul-Haq	Karachi
61	Firdous Junejo	Reserved Seat for Women
62	Taj Bibi	Reserved Seat for Women
63	Hoshang Hormusji Broacha. (Minority Member)	Reserved Seat for NonMuslim
64	Jivraj s/o Khemji. (Minority Member)	Reserved Seat for NonMuslim
