= Mir Shahdad Jo Qubo =

Ancient tomb in southern Pakistan

Mir Shahdad Jo Qubo, (English: Tomb of Mir Shahdad Talpur), is located in Shahpur Chakar (city) of the Sanghar District, in Sindh Province of southern Pakistan.

== Site ==
This is a graveyard of the family members of Mir Shahdad Talpur. It contains the tomb of Mir Shahdad Talpur (12th century), who is regarded as one of the finest military commanders of Sindh.

The structure and site are a listed Monument of Historical Importance of Pakistan.

== History ==
Mir Shahdad Jo Qubo, the famous Tomb of Mir Shahdad Talpur, is situated in the city of Shahpur Chakarof Sanghar District in the province of Sindh. The Tomb is believed to be one of the ancient heritages of the province Sindh. This is a popular graveyard of the family members of the commander Mir Shahdad Talpur. Mir Shahdad Talpur is termed as one of the greatest military commanders of the province Sindh. Mir Shahdad Khan Talpur and Mir Chakar Khan Talpur are famous twelfth century generals of the Kalhora Dynasty in the province of Sindh.

Mir Shahdad Khan was instrumental in assisting the Kalhoras due to which they became the rulers of the province Sindh. The governor of Mughal Emperor Aurangzeb gifted him land in the year 1705, even though he was an impressive landowner even before that. He developed the whole town of Shahdadpur and made it a spectacular center of the agriculture, trade and learning. He breathed last in the year 1734 and is buried at Quba Shahdad near the city of Shahpur Chakar. Three of his 4 sons rose to prominence. His eldest son Jam Nindo lost his life in the city of Mashad (Iran). His other son Mir Chakar is also buried at the place of Quba Shahdad. Mir Chakar Khan was the proposed father of Mir Sohrab Khan who developed the Talpur rule in the city of Khairpur and there the remaining family is buried.

The city of Shahdapur is named for the Mir Shahdad Talpur, whereas the city of Shahpur Chakar is named after his proposed son Mir Chakar Talpur.

After the death of Mir Shahdad Khan, the Talpurs shifted to the city of Khudabad, and there they offered the Kalhoras with safe haven in their period of trouble. This was the de facto capital until the Mir Fateh Ali Khan moved it to the city of Hyderabad after assuming the reins of power in the year 1783.
