= Chaudhri Muhammad Ali =

Prime Minister of Pakistan from 1955 to 1956

- چوہدری محمد علی
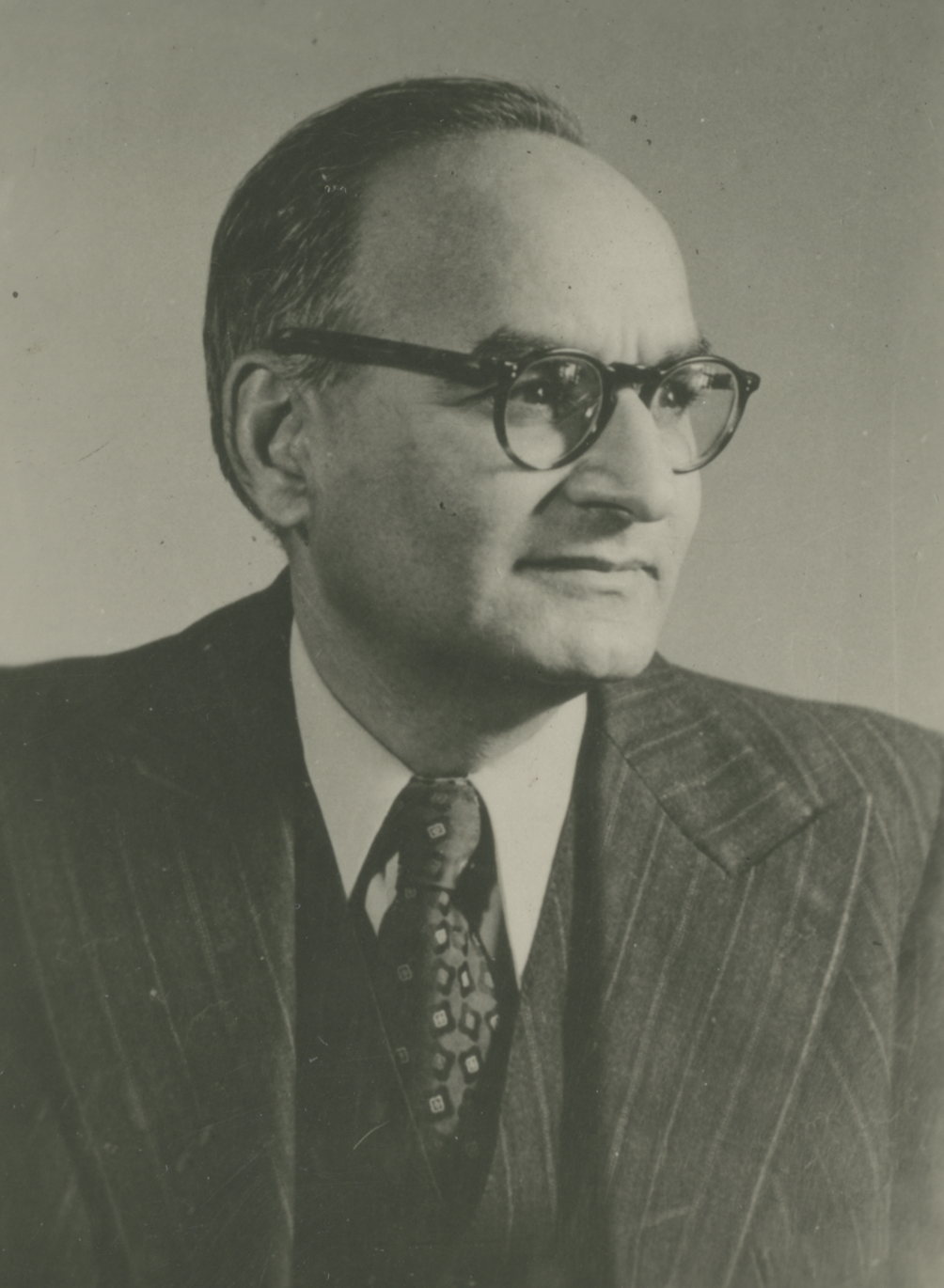
- Chaudhury Muhammad Ali

4th Prime Minister of Pakistan
- In office 12 August 1955 – 12 September 1956
- Monarch: Elizabeth II
- President: Iskander Ali Mirza
- Governor General: Iskander Ali Mirza
- Chancellor: Iskander Ali Mirza
- Governor: Amiruddin Ahmad; Sher-e-bangla Abul Kashem Fazlul Haque
- Deputy: Deputy Prime Minister of Pakistan
- Chief Minister: Abu Hussain Sarkar; Ataur Rahman Khan
- Preceded by: Mohammad Ali Bogra
- Succeeded by: Huseyn Shaheed Suhrawardy
- Constituency: Unknown

5th Minister of Defence
- In office 12 August 1955 – 12 September 1956
- Deputy: Akhter Husain (Defence Secretary)
- Position For: Himself (as also serving Prime Minister)
- Preceded by: Ayub Khan
- Succeeded by: Huseyn Shaheed Suhrawardy

2nd Minister of Finance
- In office 24 October 1951 – 11 August 1955
- Deputy: Mumtaz Hasan (Finance Secretary)
- Preceded by: Ghulam Muhammad
- Succeeded by: Amjad Ali

Federal Secretary
- In office 14 August 1947 – 24 October 1955

Finance Secretary of Pakistan
- In office 14 August 1947 – 12 September 1948 Serving with Sir Victor Turner
- Minister: Ghulam Muhammad
- In office 2 September 1946 – 14 August 1947
- Minister: Liaquat Ali Khan
- Preceded by: Ghulam Muhammad
- Succeeded by: Sir Victor Turner

President of Pakistan Muslim League
- In office 12 August 1955 – 12 September 1956
- Preceded by: Mohammad Ali Bogra
- Succeeded by: I. I. Chundrigar

Personal details
- Born: Chaudhry Muhammad Ali; 15 July 1905 Jalandhar, India
- Died: 2 December 1982 (aged 77) Karachi, Pakistan
- Citizenship: British subject (until 1947); Pakistani (from 1947)
- Party: Nizam-e-Islam (until 1969)
- Other political affiliations: Muslim League (1936–1956)
- Children: 5, including Khalid
- Education: Punjab University (BSc and MSc)
- Occupation: Civil servant; politician

Chaudhri Muhammad Ali (Note: Punjabi, Urdu: چوہدری محمد علی) (15 July 1905 – 2 December 1982) was a Pakistani politician and statesman who served as the fourth prime minister of Pakistan from 1955 until his resignation in 1956. His government oversaw the promulgation of the first Pakistani constitution, transitioning Pakistan from a dominion to a republic.

He resigned from the position of Prime Minister in 1956, and from the Muslim League as well, when he failed at healing rifts with Muslim League, and a new party, named as Republican Party. His credibility is noted for promulgating the first set of the Constitution of Pakistan lost political endorsement from his party when failing to investigate the allegations on vote rigging and the secret defections in favour of the Republican Party.

== Early life and education ==
Muhammad Ali was born in Jalandhar, Punjab on 15 July 1905 into an Arain Punjabi family.

After his matriculation, Muhammad Ali showed great aptitude for science, first moving to attend the Punjab University in Lahore where he read and graduated with BSc degree in chemistry in 1925. In 1927, Muhammad Ali attained MSc in chemistry from Punjab University, and lectured at the Islamia College until 1928.

== Civil service career ==
=== British India ===
In 1928, Muhammad Ali went to join the Indian Civil Service, first working as an accountant at the Audit and Accounts Service and was deputed to audit the Bahawalpur state. In 1936, Muhammad Ali was moved as Private Secretary to James Grigg, the Finance Minister of India, who later appointed him as the First Indian financial adviser when Grigg was appointed the War Secretary in 1945. In 1946–47, Muhammad Ali was selected to serve as one of two secretaries to the Partition Council presided over by Lord Mountbatten, later appointed Finance Secretary at the Ministry of Finance. Over this issue of partition, Muhammad Ali worked with H.M. Patel and Walter Christir to prepare a document titled The Administrative Consequences of Partition.

=== Pakistan ===
At the time of the India's partition in 1947, Muhammad Ali opted for Pakistan.

After the establishment of Pakistan in 1947, Muhammad Ali was moved as the Finance Secretary under Finance Minister Sir Ghulam Muhammad, along with Victor Turner, but this appointment lasted until 1948 due a cabinet reshuffle. He was appointed the Federal Secretary at the Establishment Division, and aided greatly in setting up the civil bureaucracy and preparing the nation's first federal budget presented by Finance Minister Sir Ghulam Muhammad in 1951. During this period, Muhammad Ali has been described as the "doyen of the civil bureaucracy".

== Finance Minister of Pakistan (1951–1955) ==
In 1951, Muhammad Ali was appointed the Finance Minister by Prime Minister K. Nazimuddin and was announced to be kept in the Finance ministry in Bogra's Talent ministry in 1953.

== Premiership (1955–1956) ==
On 11 August 1955, Muhammad Ali was appointed the Prime Minister of Pakistan by then-Governor-General Iskandar Mirza, upon the dismissal of the Bogra's Talent administration. Prime Minister Ali placed a great emphasis on drafting the Constitution of Pakistan, and implemented the One Unit scheme despite regional opposition.

He favored French architect Michel Ecochard over Greek architect Constantinos Doxiadis for the planning of the new capital in 1955, though the project nonetheless went Doxiadis in the 1960s.

It was during his term that the first Constitution of Pakistan was promulgated, on 23 March 1956, where the nation-state was declared as Islamic republic with a parliamentary form of government. His premiership was endorsed by President Iskandar Mirza and the three-party coalition government composing of Awami League, Muslim League and the Republican Party at the National Assembly. In 1955, Prime Minister Ali took over the party presidency.

In July 1956, Muhammad Ali met with the Indian Prime Minister Jawahar Lal Nehru of India in an attempt to settle the key issue that was preventing the normalization of relations between Pakistan and India. This was the issue of Kashmir that had been divided between India and Pakistan in 1948. That issue remains unsettled to this day.

Despite his feat, Prime Minister Muhammad Ali proved to be a poor politician who failed to maintain control over his party when he reached a compromise to dismissed the cabinet members of his own party in favor of appointing the cabinet composing of Republican Party and Awami League in 1955–56. After appointing Abdul Jabbar Khan as the Chief minister of West-Pakistan who subsequently helped in secret trading in favor of Republican Party that made the Republicans in majority in the National Assembly, the Muslim League demanded its president to investigate the matter but Prime Minister Ali refused to support the parliamentary resolution in the National Assembly by believing that "he was responsible only to the Cabinet and the Parliament, not the party."

On 8 September 1956, the parliamentary leaders of the Muslim League under A.Q. Khan, successfully brought the motion of no confidence at the National Assembly that effectively removed him from the party's presidency. Despite support from President Mirza, Prime Minister Ali eventually resigned when Huseyn S. Suhrawardy gained support from the Muslim League for the premiership.

== Post-resignation ==
After his resignation, Ali joined the National Bank as an advisor. He tried playing a role in national politics in the 1960s, but was ostracized by the Muslim League due to his political role played in 1950s.

His son, Khalid Anwer, served as the law and justice minister in Nawaz Sharif's administrations while his younger son, Amjad Ahsan Ali, is a medical doctor. In 1967, he wrote his memoir, The Emergence of Pakistan. He died due to a cardiac arrest on 2 December 1982 in estate in Karachi where he was buried.

== Books ==
- The Emergence of Pakistan, Research Society of Pakistan, 1967, 418 p.
- Ataturk, Ilaqi Saqafati Idarah, 1969, 320 p.

== See also ==
- Parliamentary history of Pakistan
- Central coalition government of Pakistan (1954–58)

== Notes ==
Political offices
Preceded by Malik Ghulam Muhammad	Minister of Finance; 1951–1955	Succeeded by Amjad Ali
Preceded by Muhammad Ali Bogra	Prime Minister of Pakistan; 1955–1956	Succeeded by Huseyn Shaheed Suhrawardy
Preceded by Ayub Khan	Minister of Defence; 1955–1956	Succeeded by Huseyn Shaheed Suhrawardy
