= Muhammad Shoaib =

Pakistani politician

4th & 6th Minister of Finance
- In office 15 December 1962 – 25 August 1966
- President: Ayub Khan
- Preceded by: Abdul Qadir Sanjrani
- Succeeded by: N M Uqaili
- In office 15 November 1958 – 8 June 1962
- President: Ayub Khan
- Preceded by: Syed Amjad Ali
- Succeeded by: Abdul Qadir Sanjrani

Personal details
- Born: 1907 Amilo, Azamgarh, United Provinces, British India
- Died: 13 May 1976 (aged 70) Washington, D.C.
- Children: Nafis Sadik (daughter)
- Education: Allahabad University

Muhammad Shoaib (Urdu: محمد شعیب; 1907–13 May 1976) was a Pakistani politician who served as the finance minister of Pakistan from 15 November 1958 to 8 June 1962 and again from 15 December 1962 to 23 March 1965.

== Early life and career ==
He was born in 1907 at Amilo, Azamgarh, Uttar Pradesh, British India.

Muhammad Shoaib is widely criticized for disapproving the Pakistan Atomic Energy Commission's agreement with General Electric of Canada to build a 137 MW Nuclear power plant in Pakistan. Munir Ahmad Khan (then IAEA scientist) urged his support but his diplomatic decisions created serious delay in Nuclear technology development of the country.

He resigned his position on 23 March 1965 as Finance Minister to join the World Bank as an advisor. He was associated with the World Bank for 20 years and had retired in 1975.

== Personal life ==
Muhammad Shoaib was married to Iffat Ara and they had a daughter named Nafis Sadik, a world population control activist.

== Death ==
Muhammad Shoaib died at his home near Washington, D.C. on 13 May 1976 at age 70.

Political offices
Preceded by Syed Amjad Ali	Finance Minister of Pakistan; 1958–1962	Succeeded by Abdul Qadir Sanjrani
Preceded by Abdul Qadir Sanjrani	Finance Minister of Pakistan; 1962–1965	Succeeded by N M Uqaili
