= Mahendrasinh Baraiya =

Gujarat politician (born 1978)

- Succeeded by: Gajendrasinh Parmar

Member of Gujarat Legislative Assembly
- Incumbent
- Assumed office 2017 - 2022
- Preceded by: Jay Chauhan
- Constituency: Prantij

Personal details
- Born: 1978 (age 47–48) Gujarat, India
- Party: Bharatiya Janata Party (Since 2022 -)
- Other political affiliations: Indian National Congress (Till 2022)
- Spouse: Shobhanaben Baraiya

Baraiya Mahendrasinh Kacharsinh is an Indian politician and he was elected as a member of Gujarat Legislative Assembly in 2012 from Prantij Assembly constituency as a member of Indian National Congress. He joined Bharatiya Janata Party in 2022.
