= N. M. Uqaili =

Pakistani politician

N.M Uqaili
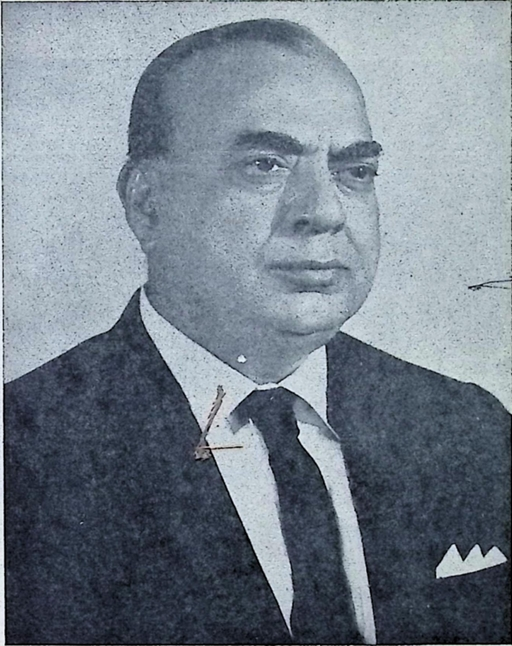

7th Minister of Finance
- In office 25 August 1966 – 25 March 1969
- President: Ayub Khan
- Preceded by: Muhammad Shoaib
- Succeeded by: Vice Admiral S. M. Ahsan

N. M. Uqaili (full name: Nabi Mohammad Uqaili) was the Finance Minister of Pakistan and a Chairman of the Pakistan Industrial Credit and Investment Corporation (PICIC).

== Early life and career ==
He headed the privatisation commission during Muhammad Zia-ul-Haq's government to study the condition of the state enterprises and served as the Governor of State Bank of Pakistan. He was known as a successful businessman. His granddaughter is Pakistani politician Sharmila Farooqi.

Political offices
Preceded by Muhammad Shoaib	Finance Minister of Pakistan; 1966–1969	Succeeded by S. M. Ahsan

== See also ==
- Allah Baksh Sarshar Uqaili
- Sharmila Farooqi
