= Shantubhai Patel =

Indian politician (born 1924)

Member of Parliament, Lok Sabha
- In office 1980–1984
- Preceded by: H.M. Patel
- Succeeded by: H.M. Patel
- Constituency: Sabarkantha, Gujarat

Personal details
- Born: 10 September 1924 Talod Village, Prantij, Sabarkantha District, British India
- Party: Indian National Congress
- Spouse: Kamalaben
- Children: 3 sons and a daughter

Shantubhai Chunibhai Patel (born 10 September 1924) was an Indian politician. He was elected to the Lok Sabha, lower house of the Parliament of India from Sabarkantha in 1980 as a member of the Indian National Congress.
