= Syed Amjad Ali =

Pakistani IFS officer and Politician

Syed Amjad Ali OBE
- سید امجد علی

3rd Minister of Finance
- In office 12 September 1956 – 7 October 1958
- Prime Minister: Huseyn Shaheed Suhrawardy; I. I. Chundrigar; Feroz Khan Noon
- Preceded by: Chaudhry Muhammad Ali
- Succeeded by: Muhammad Shoaib

Permanent Representative of Pakistan to the United Nations
- In office 1964 – 25 March 1967
- Appointed by: Ayub Khan
- Preceded by: Muhammad Zafarullah Khan
- Succeeded by: Agha Shahi

Pakistan Ambassador to the United States
- In office 26 September 1953 – 17 September 1955
- Prime Minister: Muhammad Ali Bogra; Chaudhry Mohammad Ali
- Preceded by: Muhammad Ali Bogra
- Succeeded by: Muhammad Ali Bogra

Personal details
- Born: 5 July 1907 Lahore, British India
- Died: 5 March 1997 (aged 89) Lahore, Pakistan
- Party: Republican Party
- Relations: Syed Babar Ali (brother); Syed Wajid Ali (brother)
- Occupation: Politician and civil servant

Syed Amjad Ali (Urdu: سید امجد علی; 5 July 1907 – 5 March 1997) was a Pakistani politician and a civil servant during the British Raj era, who served as the 3rd Minister of Finance (Pakistan) from 1956 to 1958 and as Pakistan Ambassador to the United States from 1953 to 1955.

== Early life and education ==
Syed Amjad Ali was born in Lahore, the eldest son of Sir Syed Maratib Ali, a prominent Muslim businessman in the Punjab. Syed Babar Ali and Syed Wajid Ali were his younger brothers. He had social and political connections for diplomacy in the final days of the British colony, as he knew many prominent people in the Muslim, Hindu, Sikh and British communities.

Ali was educated at the St. Agnes Loreto Convent in Lucknow, Uttar Pradesh, followed by the Muslim High School and Government College in Lahore. After receiving his B. A. in 1927, he went to London for legal studies at the Middle Temple. While in London, he served as honorary secretary of the Muslim delegations at the First Round Table Conference in 1930–31 and for the Indian delegation at the Second Round Table Conference at the end of 1931.

== Career ==
Syed Amjad Ali returned home and worked for his father's company, A. & M. Wazir Ali which included a Ford Motor Company assembly plant in Karachi, Pakistan. He was appointed an OBE in the 1936 Birthday Honours. and a CIE in 1944 Birthday Honours.

During the last few years of British rule, Ali worked closely with "two giants of pre-partition Punjab politics"— Fazl-i-Hussain and Sir Sikandar Hayat Khan — while sitting in the Punjab Legislative Assembly (1937–45) and the Constituent Assembly of India (1946).

After independence from India and British rule, Ali served as Pakistan's Ambassador to the United States (1953–55), Finance Minister of Pakistan (1955–58), and Pakistan's Permanent Representative to the United Nations (1964–67).

According to the New York Times newspaper:

"He was among those who worked to gain Pakistan a place of recognition in world affairs".

== Books ==
- The United Nations and I : 1950-1993
- Glimpses (1992) (autobiography)
- Prints & imprints
- Ustad Bashir ud Din : the last master from Lahore School of Painters

Diplomatic posts
| Preceded by Muhammad Ali Bogra | Pakistan Ambassador to the United States; 1953 – 1955 | Succeeded by Muhammad Ali Bogra |
| Preceded by Muhammad Zafrulla Khan | Pakistan Ambassador to the United Nations; 1964 – 1967 | Succeeded by Agha Shahi |
Political offices
| Preceded by Chaudhry Muhammad Ali | Finance Minister of Pakistan; 1955 – 1958 | Succeeded by Muhammad Shoaib |
