= Prantij Assembly constituency =

Legislative Assembly constituency in Gujarat State, India

Coordinates: 23.44°N 72.85°E

Prantij
- Constituency No. 33 for the Gujarat Legislative Assembly

Constituency details
- Country: India
- Region: Western India
- State: Gujarat
- District: Sabarkantha
- Lok Sabha constituency: Sabarkantha
- Established: 2007
- Total electors: 259,317
- Reservation: None

Member of Legislative Assembly
- 15th Gujarat Legislative Assembly
- Incumbent Gajendrasinh Parmar
- Party: Bharatiya Janata Party
- Elected year: 2022

Prantij is one of the 182 Legislative Assembly constituencies of Gujarat state in India. It is part of Sabarkantha district.

== List of segments ==
This assembly seat represents the following segments,

1. Prantij Taluka
2. Talod Taluka – Entire taluka except village – Charanvanta

== Members of Legislative Assembly ==
- 2007 - Jay Chauhan, Bharatiya Janata Party
- 2012 - Mahendrasinh Baraiya, Indian National Congress

Year	Member	Picture	Party
2017	Gajendrasinh Parmar		Bharatiya Janata Party
2022	Gajendrasinh Parmar		Bharatiya Janata Party

== Election results ==
=== 2022 ===
Gujarat Assembly election, 2022: Prantij Assembly constituency
Party	Candidate	Votes	%	±%
BJP	Gajendrasinh Udesinh Parmar	105324	57.23	+10.08
INC	Bahecharsinh Harisinh Rathod	40702	22.12	−23.47
AAP	Alpeshkumar Nareshbhai Patel	32139	17.46	New
RRP	Jyotiben Ashokbhai Rathod	621	0.34	N/A
NOTA	None of the above	3114	1.69	
Majority			35.11	
Turnout				
Registered electors		258,879		
BJP hold		Swing		

=== 2017 ===
Gujarat Legislative Assembly Election, 2017: Prantij
Party	Candidate	Votes	%	±%
BJP	Gajendrasinh Parmar	83,482	47.15	+3.78
INC	Mahendrasinh Baraiya	80,931	45.70	−2.07
NCP	Rajendrasinh Zala	3,718	2.10	New
Majority		2,551	1.45	−2.95
Turnout		1,77,073	74.61	−0.59
BJP gain from INC		Swing		

=== 2012 ===
Gujarat Assembly Election, 2012
Party	Candidate	Votes	%	±%
INC	Mahendrasinh Baraiya	76097	47.77	
BJP	Jaysinhji Chauhan	69083	43.37	
Majority		7014	4.40	
Turnout		159303	75.20	
INC gain from BJP		Swing		
