= Allah Baksh Sarshar Uqaili =

Sufi poet of Sindh

Allah Baksh Uqaili

Personal details
- Born: 21 January 1907 Karachi,
- Died: 15 January 1971 (aged 63) Thatta

Academic background
- Influences: Jalal ad-Din Muhammad Rumi, Allama Makhdoom Muhammad Hashim Thattvi, Shah Abdul Karim Bulri

Academic work
- School or tradition: Islamic Sufism
- Main interests: lyric poetry, music, spirituality
- Notable ideas: Islam, Muhammad, Quran, Sufi poetry, Sufi philosophy, and Sufi music
- Influenced: Almost all Sindhi Poets and many Paksistani scholars

Allah Baksh Sarshar 'Uqaili (January 21, 1907 - January 15, 1971) was a Sufi poet from the Sindh province of Pakistan.

== Work ==
Allah Baksh published his first book, Ramooz-un-Nisa, in 1920, followed by Dawat-e-Islam (1923), Manasik-e-Hajj (1924) and Khalid bin Walid (1929). During this time his poetry and articles used to appear in magazines like Al-Waheed, Sindh Madarisa magazine, Al-Hafiz al-jamia Sindh College. He wrote in Urdu under the pen name "Sarshar 'Uqaili" for the magazine Tasawuff, published in Lahore.

He also served as the editor of Al-Waheed newspaper for four years. From 1942 till 1945, Uqaili served as chief Officer of District Local board in Karachi, and president of Rajmikal music club in Karachi and wrote a book entitled The history of Sindhi Rag (Sindhi mystic folks).

Also, books like ilm-e-hinat ("The Study of Astronomy") appeared in his name. In 1947, when Pakistan and India separated, he was given the office of "food and livestock" in the government of Sindh and used to broadcast historical and literary speeches from Radio Pakistan, and wrote for Nai Zindagi magazine.

In October 1950, he founded a center for literary studies and served as its President, and served in many other such centers. His affection for Sindh poetry led him to compile a large collection of Sindhi national poems with the title Sindh Jo Tarano, which was published by the Sindh Society. In November 1955, he founded the Sindh Library in Karachi and at the same time founded the Bazm-Talib-ul-Mola academy in Hyderabad. Due to all these efforts, Makhdoom Muhammad Zaman Talib-ul-Mola declared him as his vice-regent in 1952.

After that, he ran the office of Director of Settlement Services in Hyderabad. Following his tenure at that post, he was designated as Commissioner and District Magistrate of Hyderabad and stayed as chairman of the Sindhi Adabi Board from March 1955 to September 1961.

Amongst his other contributions is that he collected his family tree. In his last days, Uqaili suffered dacoity at his house in Thatta. His personal library, with all of his writings, was stolen and many of his works were lost. Since then, much of his work is believed to have been plagiarized.

On January 15, 1971, when he was 64, the Sufi poet died and was buried in his ancestral graveyard in Thatta, leaving behind a widow, his younger brother N M Uqaili, four daughters and a son who married the granddaughter of Allama Makhdoom Muhammad Hashim Thattvi.

== See also ==
- N M Uqaili
- Makhdoom Muhammad Zaman Talib-ul-Mola
- Allama Makhdoom Muhammad Hashim Thattvi
- Sharmila Farooqi
