= The Emergence of Pakistan =

1967 Memoir by Chaudhri Muhammad Ali

- Title page for The Emergence of Pakistan (1967)
- Author: Chaudhri Muhammad Ali
- Language: English
- Subject: Pakistan Movement; Partition of India
- Genre: Political memoir
- Publisher: Columbia University Press
- Publication date: 1967
- Publication place: Pakistan
- Media type: Print (hardcover)
- Pages: 418
- ISBN: 9780231029339
- OCLC: 411012
- LC Class: DS480.83 .A65

The Emergence of Pakistan is a 1967 memoir by Chaudhri Muhammad Ali, who briefly served as prime minister of Pakistan. The book examines the events leading to the creation of Pakistan two decades earlier, with a particular focus on the agreement between Lord Mountbatten and Indian National Congress leaders for a rapid transfer of power. Ali contends that this expedited process introduced major challenges for Pakistan and contributed to the enduring Kashmir dispute.

The book is divided into 17 chapters: the first eight provide a historical overview of the British Raj and dyarchy, including profiles of prominent Muslim and Hindu leaders. Subsequent chapters discuss Pakistan's early administrative, industrial, agricultural, diplomatic, and military issues, disputes over boundaries, the integration of princely states, civil unrest, and the status of refugees and minorities until the death of Jawaharlal Nehru. The concluding chapters evaluate the state of Pakistan's economy, finance, education, administration, and politics at the time of writing.

== Reception ==
The book has been reviewed by American Historical Review, American Political Science Review, Kirkus Reviews, Middle East Journal, Political Science Quarterly, and RAND.
