= Muhammad Hashim Thattvi =

Islamic scholar

Makhdoom Muhammad Hashim Thattvi Sindhi محمد هاشم التتوي سنڌي

Personal life
- Born: 19 November 1692 Bathoro, Thatta Subah, Mughal Empire
- Died: 11 February 1761 (aged 68) Thatta, Sind State, Durrani Empire
- Resting place: Makli Necropolis, Thatta District
- Occupation: Faqih, mufassir, muhaddith and poet

Religious life
- Religion: Islam
- Denomination: Sunni
- Order: Qadiri
- Jurisprudence: Hanafi
- Creed: Maturidi

Muḥammad Hāshim Thattvī Sindhi (1692 – 1761; Sindhi: مخدوم محمد هاشم ٺٺوي سنڌي, Arabic: المخدوم محمد هاشم التتوي السندي) was an Islamic scholar, author, philanthropist, and a spiritual leader who was considered a saint by his followers. He was the first ever translator of the Quran in Sindhi language.

== Activities ==
He also ran the office of the Chief Justice and stayed the Governor of Sindh and connected areas of Punjab in the Kalhora era. He was also a feudal lord and tribe chieftain. He was the leading Islamic theologian and the Imam of the Grand Mosque at Thatta. He engaged himself in missionary duties and was famous among Sufis. He wrote Madah Nama Sindh (a book about Islam in Sindhi society and culture), Dirham al-Surrat Fi Wada al-Yadayn Taht al-Surrah (a book based on the Hanafi theology), Al-Baqiyat as-Salihat (a biography of great Islamic figures) and other books. His religious dictums shaped Sindhi culture and Islamic tradition in Sindh. He was believed to be a leading expert authority on the Fatwa-e-Alamgiri. He belonged to the Qadiri order of Sufism, and followed the Hanafi school of thought. He has a large following throughout the Muslim world specially in Sindh and Thatta district in specific.

== Family lineage ==
The name of Makhdoom Sahib was Muhammad Hashim, and his father's name was Abdul Ghafoor. By caste, he was a Panhwar. The lineage of Makhdoom Muhammad Hashim is as follows:"Makhdoom Hashim son of Abdul Ghafoor son of Abdul Rahman son of Abdul Latif son of Abdul Rahman son of Khairuddin Al-Sindhi Al-Batori then Al-Behrami Al-Puri then Al-Thattvi.Makhdoom's father, Abdul Ghafoor Panhwar, was also one of the scholars of Sehwan.

== Early life and education ==
Makhdoom received his basic education, including the Quran, Persian, and Fiqh, from his father, Makhdoom Abdul Ghafoor. He later travelled to Thatta for higher education. During the Kalhora dynasty, Thatta was a major educational and cultural center, containing numerous schools and mosques.

Makhdoom Muhammad went to Makhdoom Zia uddin Thattvi to learn the science of ahadith and associated matters. It took him nine years to learn Persian and Arabic. Meanwhile, his father Makhdoom Abdul Ghafoor died on 1113 Hijri in the blessed month of Dhul-hajj and was buried in his place at Sehwan.

Makhdoom visited Makkah and Madinah and learned exegesis, hadiths, religious fundamentals, tajwid and fiqh.

== Books ==
He wrote books in Arabic, Sindhi and Persian including:

- Madah Nama Sindh (مدح نامه سنڌ): The book contains merits and values of Sindh and Sindhi society in the 18th century.
- Dirham al-Surrat Fi Wada al-Yadayn Taht al-Surrah.
- al-Baqiyat as-Salihat (الباقيات الصالحات).
- Fakihat al-Bustan fi Masa’il al-Sayd wa al-Dhabh: Unpublished, edited by Dr. Ahmed Iqbal al-Qasimi at the University of Sindh.
- Mazahir al-Anwar fi Masa’il al-Siyam
- Nur al-Aynayn fi Ithbat al-Ishara fi al-Tashahhudayn
- Kashf al-Rayn ‘an Mas’ala Raf’ al-Yadayn
- Fara’id al-Islam
- Al-Bayad al-Hashimi

His authored books are included in the syllabus of Al-Azhar University today as well. Some of his books have recently been translated into Sindhi by Allama Muhammad Idrees Dahiri and Ghulam Mustafa Qasmi, including Madah Nama Sindh, al-Baqiyat as-Salihat and Khamsat at-Tahirah.

== Mausoleum and shrine ==
Thousands of devotees and followers visit his mausoleum and shrine every day which is located in Makli, Thatta, near the historical Makli graveyard. Many followers are buried alongside his shrine. Few of the names of the notables resting there are as follows: Ubaidullah Sindhi and Hassam-ud-Din Rashidi.

== Urs - Death Anniversary ==
Makhdoom Hashim's urs is celebrated every year on the 6th of rajab at the shrine.

The day's proceedings involve recitation of the Quran, hymns and praises of Allah and Muhammad and the Prophet, and religious discourses are given by local orators and scholars.

== See also ==
Allah Baksh Sarshar Uqaili
