= Shobhanaben Baraiya =

Indian politician

Member of Parliament, Lok Sabha
- Incumbent
- Assumed office 4 June 2024
- Preceded by: Dipsinh Shankarsinh Rathod
- Constituency: Sabarkantha

Personal details
- Born: 9 June 1973 (age 52) Majara, Gujarat
- Spouse: Mahendrasinh Baraiya (m.28 April 1998)
- Parent(s): Kansinh Makwana, Shardaben

Shobhanaben Mahendrasinh Baraiya is an Indian politician and the elected candidate for Lok Sabha from Sabarkantha Lok Sabha constituency. She is a member of the Bharatiya Janata Party.

== See also ==
- 18th Lok Sabha
