= Hirubhai M. Patel =

Indian civil servant and politician

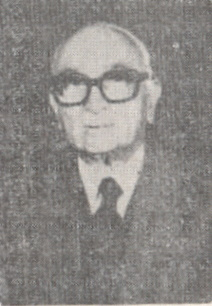

Minister of Home Affairs
- In office 24 January 1979 – 28 July 1979
- Preceded by: Morarji Desai
- Succeeded by: Yashwant Chavan

Minister of Finance
- In office 24 March 1977 – 24 January 1979
- Preceded by: Chidambaram Subramaniam
- Succeeded by: Charan Singh

Defence Secretary
- In office 7 October 1947 – 20 July 1953
- Preceded by: G. S Bhalja
- Succeeded by: B. B. Ghosh

Member of parliament, Lok Sabha for Sabarkantha
- In office 1984–1989
- Preceded by: Shantubhai Patel
- Succeeded by: Maganbhai Patel
- In office 1977–1980
- Preceded by: Maniben Patel
- Succeeded by: Shantubhai Patel

Personal details
- Born: 27 August 1904 Bombay, Bombay Presidency, British India
- Died: 30 November 1993 (aged 89) Vallabh Vidyanagar, Kheda, Gujarat, India
- Party: Swatantra Party
- Children: 5; including Amrita Patel
- Occupation: Civil servant, politician
- Known for: National security during the Partition of India (1947)

Hirubhai Mulljibhai Patel CIE, also known as H. M. Patel, (27 August 1904 — 30 November 1993) was an Indian civil servant who played a major role in the issues regarding internal and national security in the first years after the independence of India. From 1977 to 1979, he served as the Finance Minister and later Home Minister of India. He was also the chairman of the Charutar Vidya Mandal, which founded Vallabh Vidyapith that was later on named as Sardar Patel University, Vallabh Vidyanagar.

== Early life and career ==
Patel was born on 27 August 1904 in Bombay (now Mumbai), in the erstwhile Bombay Presidency of British India. He was educated St. Xavier's in Bombay, before he left for England, aged 14. He graduated from St Catherine's College, Oxford with a major in economics and joined the Indian Civil Service in October 1927. From 1927 to 1933, he served as an assistant collector in North Canara and Ahmednagar, and as Collector of Bharuch, after which he received attachment to the Central Board of Revenue in 1934. In March 1936, he was appointed an officiating deputy secretary in the finance department of the Bombay Presidency. From July 1937, he served as the Indian Trade Commissioner in Hamburg, Germany until the outbreak of war, after which he returned to India and was posted as a deputy Trade Commissioner in January 1940. In September that year, he was appointed a deputy secretary in the Department of Supply, rising to the rank of full secretary by 1945. In the 1946 New Year Honours list, Patel was appointed a Companion of the Order of the Indian Empire (CIE).

== As a civil servant ==
Patel became Home Secretary under Vallabhbhai Patel in 1946, serving till 1950. Up to independence, Patel worked with Chaudhry Muhammad Ali, the future Prime Minister of Pakistan, and Walter John Christie on the preparation and implementation of the crucial document The Administrative Consequences of Partition.

He was the head of the Emergency Committee administering Delhi in the days following the outbreak of massive violence following the Partition of India in 1947. Patel headed the effort to rehabilitate millions of Hindu and Sikh refugees entering the city, while protecting the Muslims living in the city.

Patel served as India's Defence Secretary between 1947 and 1953. In 1950, he was tasked with reducing the powers of the Indian Armed Forces because it was feared that the Forces might take over the country. Patel succeeded in doing so by erecting the bureaucracy as a stonewall between the Forces and the ministers. On the other hand, he succeeded in separating finances from the Forces, by pushing for the civilian government to pass a separate budget for defence in the Parliament every year. Patel continued as one of India's highest-ranking civil servants till 1958.

Patel, during his tenure as secretary in the Ministry of Finance, was led to resign from the position along with Finance Minister T. T. Krishnamachari over the Mundhra Scandal in 1958.

== As politician ==
Patel first contested the election to the Lok Sabha, the lower house of the Indian Parliament, in 1967. Contesting from the Swatantra Party, Patel lost due be being largely unknown to the electorate. Following the defeat of Indira Gandhi's Congress Party in the 1977 elections that ended the Indian Emergency, Patel was appointed the Finance Minister by the new Prime Minister Morarji Desai, who was leading India's first non-Congress administration. He changed many of India's socialist economic policies, ending barriers to foreign investment and reducing tariffs while protecting home industries. He was responsible for the policy that all foreign companies must form corporations with an Indian company holding a 50 per cent stake, which caused Coca-Cola to pull out of India, but most others did not.

Patel was later appointed Home Minister when Charan Singh rejoined the cabinet of Morarji Desai as Finance Minister in 1979. Patel was a fervent admirer of Vallabhbhai Patel, and a critic of Jawaharlal Nehru.

Patel was the chairman of the Gujarat Electricity Board and was a trustee and supporter of the Sardar Patel University in Anand district. He joined the Swatantra Party of C. Rajagopalachari, which was committed to free market economic policies.

Patel resigned as a member of the Lok Sabha over the Bofors scandal during his second term. He represented the Sabarkantha constituency in the House first between 1977 and 1980, and then between 1984 and 1989. He did not contest the 1991 general election due to advancing old age. He died on 30 November 1993 at his residence in Vallabh Vidyanagar in the Kheda (now in Anand district), of Gujarat. He was survived by five daughters; one daughter Amrita Patel then served as the managing director of the National Dairy Development Board.

== Literary career ==
Patel wrote two books: Rites of Passage: A Civil Servant Remembers and The First Flush of Freedom: Recollections and Reflections. He also translated some books of K. M. Munshi from Gujarati to English.

He was a senior ranking functionary of the Sumati Morarjee Shipping Company after his retirement from the Indian civil service.

Political offices
Preceded by C. Subramaniam	Finance Minister of India; 1977–1979	Succeeded by Choudhary Charan Singh
