= Muhammad Idrees Dahri =

Muslim scholar (born 1947)

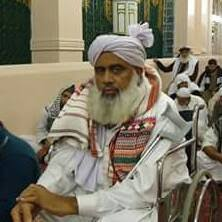
- Born: 17 September 1947 (age 78); Nawabshah Pakistan
- Occupations: Islamic scholar, writer, poet
- Children: Ashique Hussain Ahsanullah Asadullah Mufti Ubedullah Waliullah

Philosophical work
- School: Hanafi
- Main interests: Tafsir, Seerah, Tasawwuf

Muhammad Idrees Dahri (Urdu: علامہ محمد ادریس ڈاہری, Sindhi: علامه محمد ادريس ڏاهري; born 17 September 1947) is an Islamic scholar, preacher, writer, author, poet and researcher from Sindh, Pakistan. He is Hanafi, Maturidi, and belongs to the Naqshbandi Mujaddidi Sufi order and the Barelvi movement of Sunni Islam. He is a khalifa (deputy) of Allah Bakhsh Abbasi Naqshbandi. He also has teaching permissions in Shadhili and Alawi Sufi orders.

== Tariqat ==
He entered the Naqshbandi order by taking an oath of allegiance with Allah Bakhsh Abbasi Naqshbandi of Sindh, and received Khilafat (Ijazah) on 18 Rabi-us-Sani 1405AH. In the Alawi Sufi order, he received Ijazah from Zain ibn Ibrahim Sameet al-Alawi of Makkah, and in the Shadhili Sufi order, he has Ijazah from Fahmi of Medina.

== Books ==
=== Books ===
- Tafsir of the Holy Quran (Sindhi) in 8 volumes
- Faza'il-e-Miswak (Sindhi: فضائل مسواڪ)
- Iden Ja Fazail Aen Masail (Sindhi: عيدين جا فضائل ۽ مسائل)
- Juma Ja Fazail Aen Masail (Sindhi: جمعه جا فضائل ۽ مسائل)
- Karamat Imam Rabbani (Sindhi: ڪرامات امام رباني), contains miracles of Imam Rabbani
- Ad-Dolat al-Kubra (Urdu: الدولۃ الکبریٰ), Sharah Asma-ul-Husna
- Thubut Khatm-e-Nabuwwat (Sindhi: ثبوت ختم نبوت)

=== Translations ===
- Baqiat al-Salihat (Sindhi: باقيات الصالحات), translated from Arabic into Sindhi, author: Allama Makhdoom Muhammad Hashim Thattvi, biographies of Muhammad's wives.
- Khamsat al-Tahirah (Arabic: خلاصة النفحات الباهرة في جواز القول بالخمسة الطاهرة), translated from Arabic into Sindhi, author: Allama Makhdoom Muhammad Hashim Thattvi, about the proofs in Sharia regarding the concept of Panjtan Pak (Five Blessed)
- Madah Nama Sindh (Sindhi: مدح نامه سنڌ), translated from Arabic into Sindhi, author: Allama Makhdoom Muhammad Hashim Thattvi, Praise of Sindh in Islamic history
