= Khalid Anwer =

Pakistani lawyer (1938–2025)

Minister of Law, Justice and Human Rights
- Prime Minister: Nawaz Sharif

Personal details
- Born: 4 November 1938 Delhi, British India
- Died: 12 March 2025 (aged 86) Karachi, Sindh, Pakistan
- Relations: Chaudhri Muhammad Ali (Father)

Khalid Anwer (Urdu/Punjabi: خالد انور; 4 November 1938 – 13 March 2025) was a Pakistani lawyer, jurist and constitutional expert who once served as the federal Minister for Law, Justice and Human Rights following his appointment in 1997. He remained in office until the 1999 Pakistani coup d'état led by General Pervez Musharraf which toppled the ruling government of Nawaz Sharif. He was the son of Chaudhry Muhammad Ali, a freedom fighter and the fourth Prime Minister of Pakistan who was notable for having played a role in the formation of the first Constitution of Pakistan in 1956.

He was the chief pioneer behind the Protection of Economic Reforms Act, 1992 in Pakistan, which explicitly states that its provisions take precedence over other laws, including the Foreign Exchange Regulation Act, the Customs Act, and the Income Tax Ordinance. These were termed as the root cause for Pakistani economic crisis (2022-2024) as $100 billion of black money was approximated to have no money trail and resulted in real estate ownership in the UK, USA & UAE.

Anwer obtained a B.Sc. (Hons.) and LLB degree from the University of the Punjab's famous Punjab University Law College and later a B.A. (Hons.) degree from Cambridge. In addition, he was a barrister-at-law from the Inner Temple, England. In March 1997, Anwer was elected as a member of the Senate of Pakistan for a term of six years.

Anwer had an experience of 38 years as a court advocate and legal expert and argued cases relating to constitutional matters in the Supreme Court, as well as commercial issues. In 1993, he played an instrumental role in persuading the Supreme Court to restore the deposed federal government back into office and in 1996, convinced the Supreme Court that the previous government's dismissal was lawful. While in office as the law minister, he sought assistance of the Asian Development Bank for a complete overhaul of Pakistan's entire legal system. Until his death, he was running a Karachi-based law firm called Khalid Anwer & Co.

Anwer died in Karachi, Sindh on 13 March 2025, at the age of 86.

Preceded by Unknown	Minister of Law, Justice and Human Rights; 1997–1999	Succeeded by Unknown
