= Sabarkantha Lok Sabha constituency =

Lok Sabha constituency in Gujarat

Coordinates: 23.8°N 73.0°E

Sabarkantha
- Lok Sabha constituency
- Sabarkantha Lok Sabha Constituency સાબરકાંઠા લોક સભા મતદાર વિભાગ

Constituency details
- Country: India
- Region: Western India
- State: Gujarat
- Assembly constituencies: Himatnagar; Idar; Khedbrahma; Bhiloda; Modasa; Bayad; Prantij
- Established: 1952
- Total electors: 19,76,349 (2024)
- Reservation: None

Member of Parliament
- 18th Lok Sabha
- Incumbent Shobhanaben Baraiya
- Party: Bharatiya Janata Party
- Elected year: 2024

Sabarkantha is one of 26 Lok Sabha (parliamentary) constituencies in Gujarat state in western India.

== Vidhan Sabha segments ==
Presently, Sabarkantha Lok Sabha constituency comprises seven Vidhan Sabha (legislative assembly) segments. These are:

Constituency number	Name	Reserved for (SC/ST/None)	District	Party	2024 Lead
27	Himatnagar	None	Sabarkantha	BJP	BJP
28	Idar	SC	Sabarkantha	BJP	BJP
29	Khedbrahma	ST	Sabarkantha	INC	INC
30	Bhiloda	ST	Aravalli	BJP	INC
31	Modasa	None	Aravalli	BJP	BJP
32	Bayad	None	Aravalli	BJP	BJP
33	Prantij	None	Sabarkantha	BJP	BJP

== Members of Parliament ==
Year	Winner	Party
1952	Gulzarilal Nanda	Indian National Congress
1957	Gulzarilal Nanda	Indian National Congress
1962	Gulzarilal Nanda	Indian National Congress
1967	C.C. Desai	Swatantra Party
1971	C.C. Desai	Indian National Congress (O)
1973^	Maniben Patel	Indian National Congress (O)
1977	H.M. Patel	Janata Party
1980	Shantubhai Patel	Indian National Congress (I)
1984	H.M. Patel	Janata Party
1989	Maganbhai Patel	Janata Dal
1991	Arvind Trivedi	Bharatiya Janata Party
1996	Nisha Chaudhary	Indian National Congress
1998	Nisha Chaudhary	Indian National Congress
1999	Nisha Chaudhary	Indian National Congress
2001^	Madhusudan Mistry	Indian National Congress
2004	Madhusudan Mistry	Indian National Congress
2009	Mahendrasinh Chauhan	Bharatiya Janata Party
2014	Dipsinh Shankarsinh Rathod	Bharatiya Janata Party
2019	Dipsinh Shankarsinh Rathod	Bharatiya Janata Party
2024	Shobhanaben Mahendrasinh Baraiya	Bharatiya Janata Party

^ by poll

== Election results ==
=== General Election 2024 ===
2024 Indian general elections: Sabarkantha
Party	Candidate	Votes	%	±%
BJP	Shobhanaben Baraiya	677,318	53.36	▼4.26
INC	Tushar Chaudhary	5,21,636	41.09	▲5.55
NOTA	None of the above	21,076	1.66	
BSP	Ramesh Chandra Parmar	9,967	0.79	▲0.14
Majority		1,55,682	12.27	▼9.81
Turnout		12,71,490	64.19	
BJP hold		Swing		

=== General Election 2019 ===
2019 Indian general elections: Sabarkantha
Party	Candidate	Votes	%	±%
BJP	Dipsinh Shankarsinh Rathod	701,984	57.62	+8.14
INC	Thakor Rajendrasinh Shivsinh	4,32,997	35.54	−6.37
Independent	Raval Rajubhai Punjabhai	17,175	1.41	N/A
Independent	Pathan Aaiyubkhan Ajabkhan	9,177	0.75	
BSP	Vinodbhai Jethabhai Mesariya	7,912	0.65	
Majority		2,68,987	22.08	+14.49
Turnout		12,20,978	67.77	−0.05
BJP hold		Swing		

=== General Election 2014 ===
2014 Indian general elections: Sabarkantha
Party	Candidate	Votes	%	±%
BJP	Dipsinh Shankarsinh Rathod	5,52,205	49.48	+2.46
INC	Shankersinh Vaghela	4,67,750	41.91	−2.72
NOTA	None of the Above	18,249	1.64	−−−
BSP	Chandubhai Bhambhi	16,665	1.49	+0.34
IND	Solanki Chhaganbhai Kevalabhai	9,765	0.90	+0.90
Majority		84,455	7.57	+5.18
Turnout		10,95,863	67.82	+18.09
BJP hold		Swing	+2.46	

=== General Elections 2009 ===
2009 Indian general elections: Sabarkantha
Party	Candidate	Votes	%	±%
BJP	Mahendrasinh Chauhan	3,37,416	47.02	
INC	Madhusudan Mistry	3,20,261	44.63	
Independent	Chhaganbhai Solanki	28,135	3.92	
Independent	Rathod Sabirmiya Amirmiya	9,504	1.32	
Majority		17,155	2.39	
Turnout		7,17,614	49.41	
BJP gain from INC		Swing		

=== General Elections 2004 ===
2004 Indian general elections: Sabarkantha
Party	Candidate	Votes	%	±%
INC	Madhusudan Mistry	3,16,483	48.34	
BJP	Ramilaben Bara	2,76,555	42.24	
BSP	Rashidahmad Baga	23,341	3.56	
Majority		39,928	6.10	
Turnout		6,54,620	51.45	
INC hold		Swing		

=== 1952 ===
- Nanda, Gulzarilal Bulaqiram (INC) : 106,048 votes
- Maharaj Himmatsinhji Dowlatsinhji (Ind) : 83,674

== See also ==
- Sabarkantha district
- List of constituencies of the Lok Sabha

== Notes ==
Lok Sabha
Preceded by Phulpur	Constituency represented by the prime minister 1964	Succeeded by Allahabad
Preceded by Allahabad	Constituency represented by the prime minister 1966-1967	Vacant until 1967 (Prime Minister in Rajya Sabha) Title next held by Rae Bareli
