= Shahpur Chakar =

Pakistani town

Shahpur Chakar is a small town proximate to the city of Shahdadpur in the Sanghar District of Sindh province, Pakistan. It is located at an altitude of 17 m (56 ft). The word "Shahpur" comes from an Iranian language which means "a virile, dynamic and resourceful man, who possesses a certain charm of which he is entirely conscious". The city was named after four renowned saints who came to this town and laid down its historic foundation. Consequently, its four colonies are specified on the names of these mystic saints. Shahpur Chakar gained popularity because of a great and brave warrior of the time, Mir Chakar Talpur, son of Mir Shahdad Talpur.

== History ==
This city has historical prominence because of a famous site called the Tomb of Chakar. Its ancient and notable civilians belonged to the tribe of "Shah" and is a palpable reason that this town is pronounced as "Shahpur".

== Geography ==
Shahpur Chakar is in Nawabshah (Shaheed Benazir Abad) Division, Sanghar (district), Taluka Shahdadpur. It is situated between the Nawabshah and Sanghar, 30 km (19 mi) away from each city. The population of Shahpur Chakar is approximately over 50,000. There are over 100 communities in Shahpur Chakar and the surrounding small villages (called "goths" in Sindhi).

== Places ==
Shahpur Chakar is home to Mir Shahdad Jo Qubo, a historical graveyard in the northwest of the city that contains the graves of the 12th century military commanders Mir Shahdad Khan Talpur and Mir Chakar Khan Talpur as well as their families.

== Education ==
In Shahpur Chakar there is a higher secondary school for girls and one for boys. There are also two girls primary schools, two co-educational primary schools, and many private English-medium schools. Approximately 78% of the population are secondary school graduates and above. The city has produced many professionals, i.e. doctors, engineers, lawyers and teachers.

== Economy ==
The economy of Shahpur Chakar relies on agriculture. The main products are cotton, wheat, banana and mango. Public service is also a major part of the economy.

== Transport ==
There was a train service from Nawabshah to Mirpur Khas via Shahpur Chakar which is no longer in operation. However a plan to reactivate this service soon has been announced named Raja Mail and the other one historical transport was (Umrani Baloch Coach service) and Baba Gulsher Transport Service. There is an air-conditioned coach service (Javed Saleem Coach Service) to and from Hyderabad, Tando Adam and Shahdadpur twice a day. Minibus services are available to and from Nawabshah and Sanghar; for transport within the city, there are auto-rickshaws.

== Notable people ==
- Local Administrator and Prominent Personality, Ali Murad Sanjrani
- Former Member National Assembly of Pakistan Muhammad Usman Khan Noori
- Former Minister and Ambassador to Kenya Abdul Qadir Sanjrani
