= Walter John Christie =

- Born: 17 December 1905
- Died: 25 August 1983 (aged 77)
- Education: Eton College
- Spouse: Elizabeth Louise Stapleton

Walter Henry John Christie CSI, CIE, OBE (17 December 1905 – 25 August 1983) was a British colonial civil servant (Indian Civil Service) who played a key part in the independence of India and provided administrative continuity after independence. He was also referred to as John Christie and "Red Christie".

== Early life ==
The son of Henry George Frederick Christie, Walter John Christie was born in Poona, India. He was a King's Scholar at Eton where he won the Newcastle medal. At King's College, Cambridge he won the Winchester Reading Prize and took first in part one of the classical tripos in 1926 and then another in part two of the historical tripos in 1927. Christie married Elizabeth Louise Stapleton in 1934.

== Career ==
Christie joined the Indian Civil Service in 1928, and served in Bengal at Asansol and Chittagong Hill Tracts until 1937. He was then posted to New Delhi and after two years became one of the secretaries to the Viceroy of India Lord Linlithgow. In 1943, the Indian Food Department was established and Christie joined the department which was almost immediately overwhelmed by the Bengal famine of 1943 and then challenged by the task of raising food production in India.

He was Secretary of the Indian Delegation at the FAO Representative 2nd Session of the conference in 1946. In 1947 he was appointed Joint Private secretary with George Abell to the Viceroy Lord Wavell and worked on emergency plans for dealing with the possibility of a collapse of order on transition of power. Lord Mountbatten replaced Wavell as Viceroy with the objective of handing over power to a united India within a year. Christie and his colleague V. P. Menon realized partition was almost inevitable and decided to prepare a document to hold in readiness on the administrative issues involved in dividing all aspects of the state. Christie had the assistance of two civil servants Chaudhry Muhammad Ali future Prime Minister of Pakistan, and Haribhai M. Patel future Finance and Home Minister of India. The implications of the thirty-three page document The Administrative Consequences of Partition stunned the party leaders, Jawaharlal Nehru and Mohammad Ali Jinnah, to silence when presented to them.

After Indian independence Christie remained in India as an adviser to the central government committee until 1952. In 1951 he became Steward of the Indian Polo Association when the sport of polo in India most needed revival. He was Vice Chairman of the British India Corporation from 1952 to 1958 and President of the Upper India Chamber of Commerce from 1955 to 1956. He was then Vice President of the Employers Federation of India in 1956 and President of the UK Citizen’s Association in 1957. After India, he served on the Commonwealth development finance committee from 1959 to 1968 and became Adviser to the East African Development Bank from 1969 to 1970.

== Retirement ==
On retirement he wrote several articles for Blackwood's Magazine, wrote Menon's biography for the ONDB and published an autobiographical account of his service in Morning Drum. He lodged many of his papers in public archives where they have provided a source for works on Indian history. He died on 25 August 1983.

== Publications ==
- Morning Drum (BACSA) 1983
- Oxford Dictionary of National Biography Menon, Vapal Pangunni (1894-1966)
- Contributions to Blackwood’s Magazine
  - March 1970
  - November 1970 A Taste of Freedom
  - May 1971 St Cyprians Days
  - June 1971 Little Victims
