= Mir Allah Dad Talpur Halt railway station =

Railway station in Pakistan

Mir Allah Dad Talpur Halt railway station مير الهداد ٽالپر ريلوي اسٽيشن

General information
- Owner: Ministry of Railways

Other information
- Station code: MIRX

History
- Former names: Great Indian Peninsula Railway

Mir Allah Dad Talpur Halt railway station (Urdu: میر الله داد تالپور ہالٹ ریلوے اسٹیشن, Sindhi: مير الهداد ٽالپور ريلوي اسٽيشن) is located in Pakistan.

== See also ==
- List of railway stations in Pakistan
- Pakistan Railways
