= Jacobabad (disambiguation) =

Jacobabad is a city situated in Pakistan.

Jacobabad may also refer to:

- Jacobabad Air Base, an airbase in Pakistan
- Jacobabad District, an administrative unit of Sindh, Pakistan
- Jacobabad Junction railway station, a railway station in Pakistan
- Jacobabad Taluka, a tehsil of Jacobabad District
