= Nisha Chaudhary =

Indian politician (1952–2001)

MP
- In office 1996 – 2001 (Dead)
- Constituency: Sabarkantha

Personal details
- Born: 10 September 1952
- Party: Indian National Congress
- Spouse: Amarsinh B. Chaudhary
- Profession: Teacher, Sportsperson, Politician, Social Worker, Educationist

Nisha Chaudhary (1952–2001) was a social and political social worker and was elected to Lok Sabha from the Sabarkantha constituency in the Indian state of Gujarat thrice in the 1990s, as an Indian National Congress candidate.

== Personal life ==
She was born Nisha Gameti on 10 September 1952 in the Saclawada, district Dungarpur in the Indian state of Rajasthan. She divorced her husband, with whom she had two children, in 1990. In late 1980s she was a companion of former CM Amarsinh B. Chaudhary. The couple married on 13 July 1991. The wedding caused controversy because Amarsinh Chaudhary was still married to his first wife Gajraben with whom he had 3 children. Nisha was elected to Lok Sabha in 1996, 1998 and 1999, and died in 2001 in the middle of her term as Lok Sabha member.

== Education & Interests ==
Nisha was an M.A in Sociology. She was educated at Birla Institute, Pilani and Rajasthan University, Jaipur. Nisha's hobbies included singing, playing music and classical dances. Nisha is a sportsperson and participated in several sports like hockey, tennis and badminton. She was also a member of the National Cadet Corps and also attended Republic Day Contingent Camp in New Delhi for many years.

== Career ==
Nisha had worked as a Radio Artist in All India Radio, Jaipur. As a Chairman of the State Social Welfare Advisory Board, Nisha worked for women and child welfare and towards the advancement of backward classes, particularly the tribals. All throughout her career she has been associated with several social and educational institutions and continues to work for the underprivileged.

Nisha Chaudhary died in 2001. Madhusudan Mistry of Congress won the Lok Sabha bye-poll, necessitated by her death.
