= Adamson Institute of Business Administration and Technology =

Pakistani private university

Coordinates: 24.7877907°N 67.0483606°E

Adamson Institute of Business Administration and Technology (Urdu: دانشگاہِ آدمسن برائے ادارتِ بزنس و علومِ فنّی) is a private university located in Karachi, Pakistan. From 1 October 2005, the institute has been an affiliate of the University of Karachi, which accredits its degree programmes.

== Degree programs ==
- Bachelor of Business Administration
- Master of Business Administration
- Bachelor of Computer Science
