= Minister of Finance (Pakistan) =

Head of the Ministry of Finance of the Government of Pakistan

Minister of Finance, Revenue and Economic Affairs
- State Emblem of Pakistan

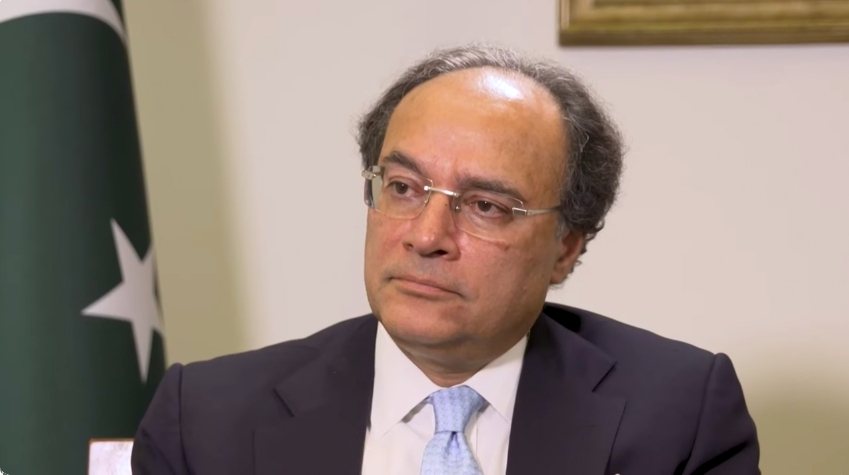
- Incumbent; Muhammad Aurangzeb since 11 March 2024
- Member of: Cabinet
- Seat: Islamabad, Islamabad Capital Territory
- Appointer: President on the advice of the Prime Minister
- Formation: August 14, 1947; 76 years ago
- First holder: Malik Ghulam Muhammad

The Minister of Finance of Pakistan (Urdu: 'Wazīr-ē-Khazana') is a leading cabinet member who heads the Ministry of Finance in the Government of Pakistan. The Minister is responsible for presenting the federal government's annual budget to the Parliament of Pakistan. Muhammad Aurangzeb is the current Finance Minister, serving since March 11, 2024.

== List of ministers ==
Legend

- Financial Advisor

| # | Name | Portrait | Entered office | Left office | Prime Minister |
|---|---|---|---|---|---|
| 1 | Malik Ghulam Muhammad | | August 15, 1947 | October 19, 1951 | Liaquat Ali Khan |
| 1 | Malik Ghulam Muhammad | | August 15, 1947 | October 19, 1951 | Sir Khawaja Nazimuddin |
| 2 | Chaudhry Muhammad Ali | | October 24, 1951 | August 11, 1955 | Sir Khawaja Nazimuddin |
| 2 | Chaudhry Muhammad Ali | | October 24, 1951 | August 11, 1955 | Mohammad Ali Bogra |
| 3 | Syed Amjad Ali | | October 17, 1955 | October 7, 1958 | Chaudhri Muhammad Ali |
| 3 | Syed Amjad Ali | | October 17, 1955 | October 7, 1958 | H. S. Suhrawardy |
| 3 | Syed Amjad Ali | | October 17, 1955 | October 7, 1958 | I. I. Chundrigar |
| 3 | Syed Amjad Ali | | October 17, 1955 | October 7, 1958 | Sir Feroze Khan Noon |
| 4 | Muhammad Shoaib | | November 15, 1958 | June 8, 1962 | -(Martial Law) |
| 5 | Abdul Qadir Sanjrani | | June 9, 1962 | December 15, 1962 | -(Martial Law) |
| 6 | Muhammad Shoaib | | December 15, 1962 | August 25, 1966 | -(Martial Law) |
| 7 | N M Uqaili | | August 25, 1966 | March 25, 1969 | -(Martial Law) |
| 8 | Vice Admiral; S. M. Ahsan | | April 5, 1969 | August 3, 1969 | -(Martial Law) |
| 9 | Nawab Muzaffar Ali Khan Qizilbash | | August 4, 1969 | February 22, 1971 | -(Martial Law) |
| 10 | Mubashar Hassan | | December 24, 1971 | October 22, 1974 | -(Martial Law) |
| 10 | Mubashar Hassan | | December 24, 1971 | October 22, 1974 | Zulfikar Ali Bhutto |
| 11 | Rana Mohammad Hanif Khan | | October 22, 1974 | March 28, 1977 | Zulfikar Ali Bhutto |
| 12 | Abdul Hafiz Pirzada | | March 30, 1977 | July 5, 1977 | Zulfikar Ali Bhutto |
| 13 | Ghulam Ishaq Khan | | July 5, 1977 | March 21, 1985 | -(Martial Law) |
| 14 | Mahbub ul Haq | | April 10, 1985 | January 28, 1986 | Muhammad Khan Junejo |
| 15 | Yasin Wattoo | | January 28, 1986 | May 29, 1988 | Muhammad Khan Junejo |
| 16 | Mahbub ul Haq | | June 9, 1988 | December 1, 1988 | -(Martial Law) |
| 17 | Ehsan-ul-Haq Piracha | | December 4, 1988 | August 6, 1990 | Benazir Bhutto |
| 18 | Sartaj Aziz | | August 6, 1990 | July 18, 1993 | Nawaz Sharif |
| 19 | Syed Babar Ali | | July 23, 1993 | October 19, 1993 | Benazir Bhutto |
| 20 | Benazir Bhutto | | January 26, 1994 | October 10, 1996 | Benazir Bhutto |
| 21 | Naveed Qamar | | October 10, 1996 | November 5, 1996 | Benazir Bhutto |
| 22 | Shahid Javed Burki | | November 11, 1996 | February 17, 1997 | Nawaz Sharif |
| 23 | Sartaj Aziz | | February 25, 1997 | August 6, 1998 | Nawaz Sharif |
| 24 | Ishaq Dar | | November 6, 1998 | October 12, 1999 | Nawaz Sharif |
| 25 | Shaukat Aziz | | November 6, 1999 | November 15, 2007 | -(Martial Law) |
| 25 | Shaukat Aziz | | November 6, 1999 | November 15, 2007 | Mir Zafarullah Khan Jamali |
| 25 | Shaukat Aziz | | November 6, 1999 | November 15, 2007 | Chaudhry Shujaat Hussain |
| 26 | Salman Shah | | November 16, 2007 | March 25, 2008 | Shaukat Aziz |
| 27 | Ishaq Dar | | March 31, 2008 | May 12, 2008 | Yousaf Raza Gillani |
| 28 | Naveed Qamar | | May 12, 2008 | October 8, 2008 | Yousaf Raza Gillani |
| 29 | Shaukat Tarin | | October 8, 2008 | February 22, 2010 | Yousaf Raza Gillani |
| - | Hina Rabbani Khar | | 24 March 2008 | 11 February 2011 | Yousaf Raza Gillani |
| 30 | Naveed Qamar | | February 22, 2010 | March 18, 2010 | Yousaf Raza Gillani |
| 31 | Abdul Hafeez Shaikh | | March 18, 2010 | February 19, 2013 | Yousaf Raza Gillani |
| 31 | Abdul Hafeez Shaikh | | March 18, 2010 | February 19, 2013 | Raja Pervaiz Ashraf |
| 32 | Saleem Mandviwalla | | February 19, 2013 | June 7, 2013 | Raja Pervaiz Ashraf |
| 33 | Ishaq Dar | | June 7, 2013 | July 28, 2017 | Nawaz Sharif |
| 34 | Rana Afzal Khan | | 26 December 2017 | 31 May 2018 | Shahid Khaqan Abbasi |
| 35 | Miftah Ismail | | April 27, 2018 | May 31, 2018 | Shahid Khaqan Abbasi |
| 36 | Shamshad Akhtar | | June 5, 2018 | August 18, 2018 | (Caretaker) |
| - | Imran Khan | | August 18 2018 | August 20 2018 | Imran Khan |
| 37 | Asad Umar | | August 20, 2018 | April 18, 2019 | Imran Khan |
| 38 | Abdul Hafeez Shaikh | | April 19, 2019 | March 29, 2021 | |
| 39 | Hammad Azhar | | March 29, 2021 | April 16, 2021 | |
| 40 | Shaukat Tarin | | April 17, 2021 | October 17, 2021 | |
| - | Shaukat Tarin | | October 17, 2021 | December 27, 2021 | |
| 41 | Shaukat Tarin | | December 27, 2021 | April 11, 2022 | |
| 42 | Miftah Ismail | | April 19, 2022 | September 27, 2022 | Shehbaz Sharif |
| 43 | Ishaq Dar | | September 28, 2022 | 10 August 2023 | Shehbaz Sharif |
| 44 | Shamshad Akhtar | | August 17, 2023 | 04 March 2024 | Anwar ul Haq Kakar |
| 45 | Muhammad Aurangzeb | | 11 March 2024 | Incumbent | Shehbaz Sharif |

== See also ==
- Constitution of Pakistan
- Defence Minister of Pakistan
- Foreign Minister of Pakistan
- Interior Minister of Pakistan
- President of Pakistan
- Prime Minister of Pakistan
