= Mahendrasinh Chauhan =

Indian politician

Member of Legislative Assembly for Sabarkantha Constituency
- In office 2009–2014
- Succeeded by: Shankersinh Vaghela

Personal details
- Born: 1 November 1953 (age 72)
- Party: Bharatiya Janata Party

Mahendrasinh Chauhan (born 1 November 1953 in Village-Bamanva District-Mehsana) is an Indian politician from Gujarat State and member of Bhartiya Janata Party. He has been a member of 15th Lok Sabha from Sabarkantha (Lok Sabha constituency) from 2009 to 2014.
